= Amiable =

British Thoroughbred racehorse

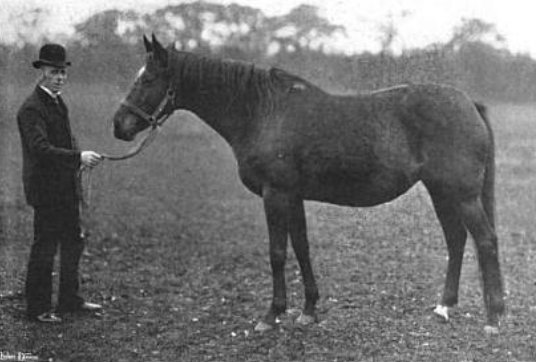
- Amiable in 1903 at the Welbeck Stud.
- Sire: St. Simon
- Grandsire: Galopin
- Dam: Tact
- Damsire: Wisdom
- Sex: Mare
- Foaled: 1891
- Country: United Kingdom
- Colour: Bay
- Breeder: William Cavendish-Bentinck, 6th Duke of Portland
- Owner: 6th Duke of Portland
- Trainer: George Dawson

Major wins
- 1,000 Guineas Stakes (1894); Epsom Oaks (1894); Park Hill Stakes (1894)

Amiable (1891–1915) was a BritishThoroughbred racehorse that won the 1894 Epsom Oaks and 1,000 Guineas Stakes despite having severe stringhalt in both hind limbs. Amiable raced until she was three years old, retiring in 1895 to the Duke of Portland's Welbeck Stud. Plagued with fertility problems, Amiable was a failure as a broodmare and produced only one foal that survived to adulthood. She was pensioned for the last 11 years of her life and was euthanised at the age of 24 in November 1915.

== Background ==
Amiable was foaled in 1891 at the Welbeck Stud near Welbeck Abbey in North Nottinghamshire, the estate of her breeder the Duke of Portland. Amiable's sire, St. Simon, won the 1884 Ascot Gold Cup and was the leading sire in Great Britain and Ireland for much of the 1890s and first decade of the 20th century. Her dam, Tact, was a full-sister to the mare Gravity, the dam of 1901 Ascot Gold Cup winner William the Third, and Florence. Tact was bought by Lord Lurgan as a potential racing prospect, but when the mare did not succeed on the turf was given to the Duke of Portland for use as a broodmare at the Welbeck Stud. As a stipulation of the transfer, any produce of Tact were to be jointly owned by Lord Lurgan and the Duke of Portland. In addition to Amiable, Tact produced the good racehorses Charm and Manners.

Amiable had severe stringhalt in both her hind limbs, causing her to greatly flex her hocks and pick her feet high off the ground with every step. The condition was more evident when Amiable walked than when she galloped and grew more pronounced toward the end of her racing career. "Our Van", writing for Baily's Magazine, described her appearance in the paddock before the 1894 St. Leger Stakes as a "half comic element" because the filly "kept picking up her legs as if she were walking on hot bricks."

== Racing career ==
Amiable was trained by George Dawson, who had also trained the Epsom Derby winners Donovan and Ayrshire for the Duke of Portland. Amiable was jointly owned by the Duke of Portland and Lord Lurgan during her racing career.

=== 1893: two-year-old-season ===
In the spring at Newmarket, Amiable was second by a length to the Duke of Westminister's Grey Leg in the Two-year-old Plate. Amiable finished second to her stablemate Schoolbook in the Royal two-year-old Plate run in May at Kempton Park. In July, Amiable ran second to Sanderling in the Lavant Stakes. In August at York, Amiable won the 1,000 sovereign Princess of Wales's Plate, beating Wherwell by a couple of lengths. In November at Liverpool, Amiable finished third in the Knowsley Nursery Handicap to Jacob and Xury. She finished the season with two wins in nine starts.

=== 1894: three-year-old-season ===
On 11 May at the Newmarket spring meeting, Amiable won the 1,000 Guineas Stakes in a 13 horse field. Mecca was the front runner from the start followed closely by Throstle and Jocasta. Mecca held on to the lead until the halfway mark, being passed at the hill by Lady Minting. Ridden by Bradford, Amiable overtook Lady Minting in front of the grandstand to win by a margin of three lengths over Lady Minting and Mecca.

Attendance at the 1894 running of The Oaks held on 8 June was rated by the London Times as average, likely owing to the threat of rainstorms. Rumours had circulated before the race that Amiable had gone lame on one leg, leading her to initially be placed at long odds in the betting. Starting against 10 other horses at 2 to 1 odds, Amiable hung at the back of the field for the early part of the race, far behind the front runner Sarana. Amiable was not a contender until nearing the straight, edging out Sweet Duchess and Sarana to win by three quarters of a length.

A few weeks later, Amiable dead heated with the filly Jocasta for third place in the Coronation Stakes, won by Throstle. In September, Amaible was fourth in the St. Leger Stakes at Doncaster, losing to Throstle, Ladas and Matchbox. A few days later, Amiable won the Park Hill Stakes, beating Sarana and Lady Normanton. In the last start of her career, Amiable was unplaced in the Cesarewitch Stakes. Amiable injured her leg at the Liverpool meeting in November and was scratched from all of her engagements. She was retired from racing at the end of the season and became a broodmare at the Welbeck Stud in 1895.

== Breeding career ==
Amiable was not successful as a broodmare, producing only one foal that survived to adulthood. Amiable produced twins to Morion during her first season at stud in 1896, the foals dying at birth. A colt sired by Carbine, named Amnesty, was born in 1897. Amnesty was later gelded and made no impact in the stud. Amiable's 1898 filly sired by Carbine died young and she delivered a stillborn foal sired by Crowberry in 1901. Amiable was infertile in 1898 and from 1902 to 1904 and aborted a foal in 1900. She was not bred from 1904 until she was euthanised in November 1915. Amiable is buried on the grounds of the Welbeck Stud.

== Pedigree ==
Pedigree of Amiable (GB), Bay Mare, 1891
Sire St. Simon (GB) Bay, 1881	Galopin; 1872	Vedette	Voltigeur
Sire St. Simon (GB) Bay, 1881	Galopin; 1872	Vedette	Mrs. Ridgeway
Sire St. Simon (GB) Bay, 1881	Galopin; 1872	Flying Duchess	The Flying Dutchman
Sire St. Simon (GB) Bay, 1881	Galopin; 1872	Flying Duchess	Merope
Sire St. Simon (GB) Bay, 1881	St. Angela; 1865	King Tom	Harkaway
Sire St. Simon (GB) Bay, 1881	St. Angela; 1865	King Tom	Pocahontas
Sire St. Simon (GB) Bay, 1881	St. Angela; 1865	Adeline	Ion
Sire St. Simon (GB) Bay, 1881	St. Angela; 1865	Adeline	Little Fairy
Dam Tact (GB) Bay, 1882	Wisdom; 1873	Blinkhoolie	Rataplan
Dam Tact (GB) Bay, 1882	Wisdom; 1873	Blinkhoolie	Queen Mary
Dam Tact (GB) Bay, 1882	Wisdom; 1873	Aline	Stockwell
Dam Tact (GB) Bay, 1882	Wisdom; 1873	Aline	Jeu d'Esprit
Dam Tact (GB) Bay, 1882	Enigma; 1872	The Rake	Wild Dayrell
Dam Tact (GB) Bay, 1882	Enigma; 1872	The Rake	England's Beauty
Dam Tact (GB) Bay, 1882	Enigma; 1872	The Sphynx	Newminster
Dam Tact (GB) Bay, 1882	Enigma; 1872	The Sphynx	Madame Stodare (Family 2)
