= Seabreeze (horse) =

British-bred Thoroughbred racehorse

- Sire: Isonomy
- Grandsire: Sterling
- Dam: St Marguerite
- Damsire: Hermit
- Sex: Mare
- Foaled: 1885
- Country: Great Britain
- Colour: Chestnut
- Breeder: Duchess of Montrose
- Owner: 5th Baron Calthorpe; 5th Earl of Rosebery
- Trainer: James Jewitt
- Jockey: William Robinson

Major wins
- Ascot Biennial Stakes (1887); Ham Stakes (1887); Oaks Stakes (1888); Coronation Stakes (1888); Lancashire Plate (1888); St. Leger Stakes (1888); Newmarket Oaks (1888)

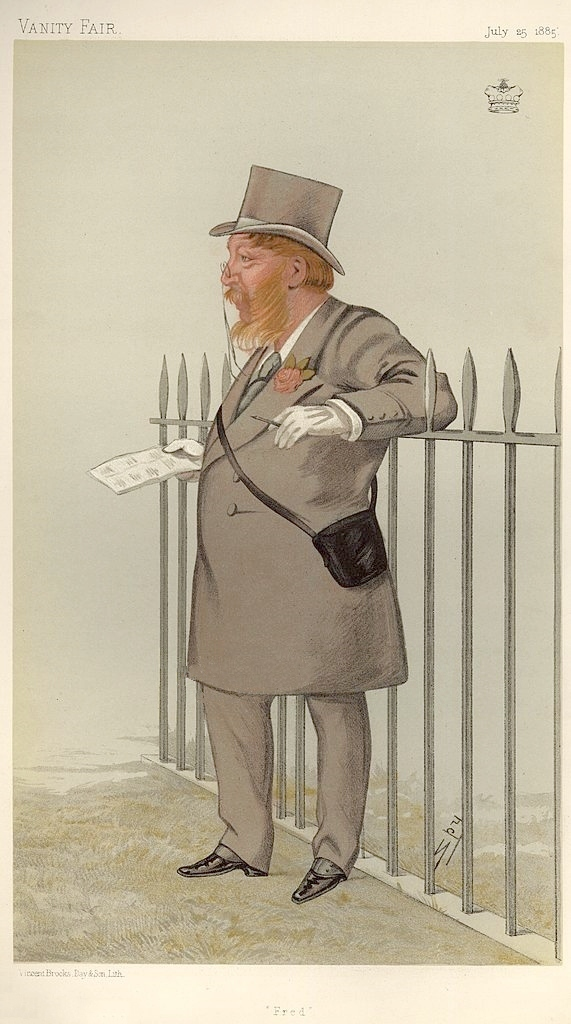
The 5th Baron Calthorpe, who owned Seabreeze during her racing career

Seabreeze (1885– 22 April 1909) was a British Thoroughbred racehorse. She won several races as a two-year-old including the Ascot Biennial Stakes, but was overshadowed by Friar's Balsam. As a three-year-old she was even better. After finishing as the runner-up in the 1000 Guineas, she won the Oaks Stakes, Coronation Stakes, Lancashire Plate, St. Leger Stakes and Newmarket Oaks. Seabreeze stayed in training as a four-year-old, when she ran in top-class races, but didn't win. She was owned by Frederick Henry William Gough-Calthorpe, 5th Baron Calthorpe, and trained by James Jewitt. As a broodmare she produced some high class runners, but none matched the success of their dam.

== Background ==
Seabreeze was a chestnut filly bred by the Duchess of Montrose and foaled in 1885. She was sired by Isonomy, who won the Ascot Gold Cup twice and the Goodwood and Doncaster Cup. He also became a successful stallion, siring the two Triple Crown winners Common and Isinglass, along with the successful stallion Gallinule. Seabreeze's dam was St Marguerite, a daughter of Hermit. St Marguerite won the 1000 Guineas and was runner-up in the Oaks. St Marguerite also had success as a broodmare, also foaling Roquebrune, the dam of Triple Crown winner Rock Sand. The Duchess of Montrose sold Seabreeze to Captain Machell, who then sold her on to Frederick Henry William Gough-Calthorpe, 5th Baron Calthorpe. The filly was put into training with James Jewitt.

== Racing career ==
=== 1887: Two-year-old season ===
Seabreeze made her racecourse début on 15 April 1887 at the Newmarket Craven meeting in the Fitzwilliam Plate. Seabreeze started as the 2/1 favourite and raced down the centre of the track. With three furlongs left to run she was just behind the leader Anarch. Anarch then lost ground, but came back in the closing stages to win by a neck from Baron Rothschild's Robert the Devil filly. Seabreeze was a further three quarters of a length back in third place.

On 8 June at Royal Ascot Seabreeze started as a 5/1 shot for the Biennial Stakes over five and half furlong two-year-old course. Seabreeze led the field from the start and despite being challenged by Dieman's Land in the final two furlongs, she extended her lead and won by five lengths. Beaufort's Hark was second and Anarch third. Two days later she stepped up in class for the New Stakes, where, conceding weight to all the other runners, she started as the 100/30 joint-second-favourite with Ayrshire; Friar's Balsam starting as the 13/8 favourite. After a couple of false starts, Friar's Balsam, racing down the centre of the track, led the field. Bartizan and Seabreeze were also near the front, but were racing down the right-hand side of the course. At the half-way point of the five and a half furlong race, Bartizan faded away, promoting Seabreeze to second and Ayrshire to third place. Ayrshire also faded before the finish, which was fought out between Friar's Balsam and Seabreeze. In the end, Friar's Balsam pulled away to win by three lengths. Seabreeze was second, well clear of third-placed Ayrshire.

At Newmarket she finished second, three quarters of a length behind odds-on favourite Friar's Balsam, in the July Stakes. At Goodwood she was a very strong favourite for the Ham Stakes. After stalking leader Lunan until the four runners had a furlong to run, she made her challenge and won easily by a length from Lunan. On 27 September, at the odds of 1/10, she easily won the Buckenham Stakes by three lengths from her only rival Nina. In the very next race, Seabreeze was made odds-on favourite for the Boscawen Stakes. In the final 100 yards of the race, Seabreeze challenged leader Disappointment and beat her by a neck, with the pair being four lengths clear of third placed Love in Idleness. In the Middle Park Plate, Seabreeze again faced Friar's Balsam, who started as the 4/9 favourite. Friar's Balsam again made the running. He was never caught and beat Hazlehatch by a length and a half. Seabreeze was a further two lengths back in third.

=== 1888: Three-year-old season ===
At Newmarket on 4 May 1888, Seabreeze started as the 6/4 favourite for the 1000 Guineas Stakes. She was ridden near to front of the field throughout the race by jockey William Robinson, but with about three furlongs to run Briar-root had a big lead over Belle Mahone, with the latter being clear of the rest of the field. At they went down the hill, Seabreeze faded as the front two pulled away. After being six lengths behind Belle Mahone, Seabreeze rallied and overtook Belle Mahone, but could not catch the leader. Briar-root won the race by two lengths from Seabreeze, who was a length ahead of third placed Belle Mahone.

One month later she faced Briar-root again in the Oaks Stakes at Epsom Downs. Only six fillies started the race, with Briar-root starting as the 5/4 favourite. Seabreeze was priced at 7/4 and Polydor at 10/1, with the other three being 100/8 or bigger. Rada made the running in the early stages and was followed by Briar-root, with Seabreeze in second to last place. Briar-root took the lead after 200 yards, by which time Seabreeze was at the rear of the field. By the time they had run half a mile Seabreeze had made up two places. Before the field reached Tattenham corner Briar-root pulled away from the others and Seabreeze took second. Briar-root was still in front as they raced down the finishing straight, but began to fade with 300 yards left to run, when Seabreeze and Belle Mahone came to the front. Seabreeze held Belle Mahone relatively easily to win by two lengths from Rada, who overtook Belle Mahone in the final 50 yards. Belle Mahone was one length behind Rada in third place. Her Majesty was fourth, Briar-root fifth and Polydor last. The time of 2 minutes and 42.8 seconds was the fastest time the race had ever been run in.

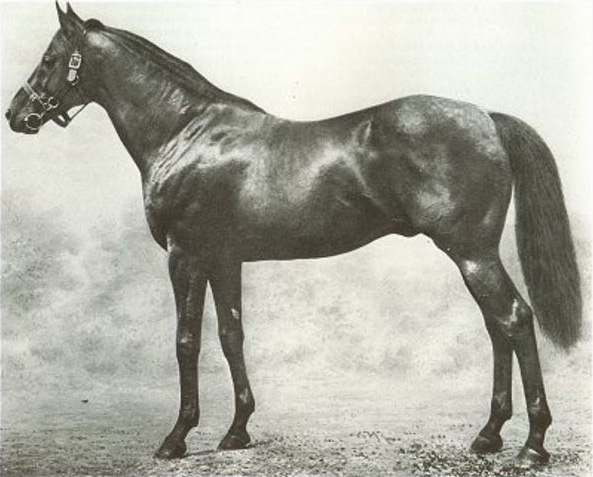
The Duke of Portland's Ayrshire, who Seabreeze raced against five times

At Royal Ascot Seabreeze started as the odds-on favourite for the one-mile Rous Memorial Stakes. Seabreeze took the lead in the second half of race, but was caught and passed by the four-year-old colt Phil in the final 100 yards. Phil beat her by half a length, with Renown four lengths behind Seabreeze in third place. Two days later she took part in the Coronation Stakes, a one-mile race for three-year-old fillies, for which she was made the odds-on favourite. After the start Fleur de Marie went in the lead and was clear of the chasing pack. As they turned into the finishing straight Love in Idleness took the lead and was followed by Estafette, with Seabreeze closing in on them. Seabreeze shot into the lead in the closing stages of the race and won easily by two lengths from Estafette, who was a neck ahead of Love in Idleness.

At Glorious Goodwood it had been raining early in the meeting, and on 1 August it was said "a smaller attendance has never been seen here" and the ground was described as "terribly heavy". Despite the conditions Seabreeze contested, and was made favourite for, the Sussex Stakes. Ossory made the running from Sheen and Arrandale, as Seabreeze was in last place, but close behind. As they turned into the finishing straight Seabreeze was still last. Ossory faded in the final stages and Seabreeze made some progress, but could only finish fourth. The finish was fought out between Estafette and Zanzibar, with the latter winning by half a length.

Ayrshire, who had since won the 2000 Guineas and Derby, was the 2/1 favourite for the St. Leger Stakes. Seabreeze was next in the betting at 5/2, then Eclipse Stakes winner Orbit at 6/1. The other thirteen runners were priced at 20/1 or bigger. At the start Ossory went into the lead, but was soon overtaken by Ayrshire. These two were followed by Orbit, Seabreeze, White Flag and Netheravon. After a quarter of a mile Ayrshire was pulled back and Estafette went into the lead from Ossory, with Seabreeze now in third place. After half a mile Ossory was ridden to regain the lead, Seabreeze having fallen back slightly to fifth. With half a mile left to run Seabreeze overtook Ossory to take the lead, the pair being followed by Chillington and Ayrshire. At the turn into the finishing straight Ayrshire went second, but then faded, leaving Seabreeze to be challenged by Chillington and Zanzibar. Seabreeze did not have much difficulty beating them and won by three lengths. Chillington just beat Zanzibar by a head for second place. She won the race in a time of 3 minutes 11.8 seconds, which was a record.

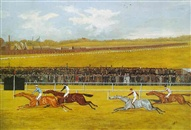
The finish, the Lancashire Plate, 1888 painted in 1889 by James Walsham Baldock showing Seabreeze's victory

On 22 September she was the 5/2 favourite for the valuable Lancashire Plate, a weight-for-age race run over seven furlongs at Manchester Racecourse. She faced strong opposition, including Ayrshire, Friar's Balsam and Phil. Sawdust led the 24-runner field, as Seabreeze raced with Phil near the middle of the pack. Ayrshire took the lead two furlongs from home, followed by La Sancy and Phil, as Seabreeze made quick progress through the field and moved into fourth place. Seabreeze then took second and challenged Ayrshire for the lead. The pair raced side by side, until Seabreeze just edged away inside the last 50 yards and won by three quarters of a length. Le Saucy finished in third place, a length and a half behind Ayrshire. At the Newmarket Second October meeting she was opposed by only one filly and started at the odds of 7/200 for the Newmarket Oaks. Beatrix led the race until they were five furlongs from the finish, when Seabreeze pulled a length clear. However Breatrix came back at Seabreeze and the two raced side-by-side until the line, with Seabreeze winning by a head.

=== 1889: Four-year-old season ===
Seabreeze returned as a four-year-old for the Royal Stakes at Kempton Park. Despite her victories the previous season she started at 10/1, with the opposition including Friar's Balsam, Melanion and Ayrshire. Odds-on favourite Friar's Balsam began to struggle with half a mile still to run. As the field turned into the straight Ayrshire took the lead from Wishing Gate and was followed through by Seabreeze. The pair quickly drew away from the pack, but Seabreeze could not overhaul Ayrshire and lost out to him by one length. This second place earned her £500.

In the Rous Memorial Stakes at Royal Ascot she started as favourite for the first time since the Lancashire Plate. At the halfway point Seabreeze and El Dorado, drew up to Love in Idleness, who had led since the start. However, Love in Idleness repelled the challengers to win by neck from El Dorado. Seabreeze was third, half a length behind the runner-up. She faced her old rival Ayrshire again in the Eclipse Stakes at Sandown Park. The six-runner field got off to a good start on the first attempt. Seabreeze went to the front, but was pulled back by Robinson, leaving the three-year-old Gold in front. As they turned into the finishing straight the runners bunched up, with Seabreeze lying in fifth place. Seabreeze looked beaten with a quarter of a mile left to run and played no part in the finish. Ayrshire won the race by two lengths from El Dorado, who just beat seclusion for second. Seabreeze finished back in fifth place.

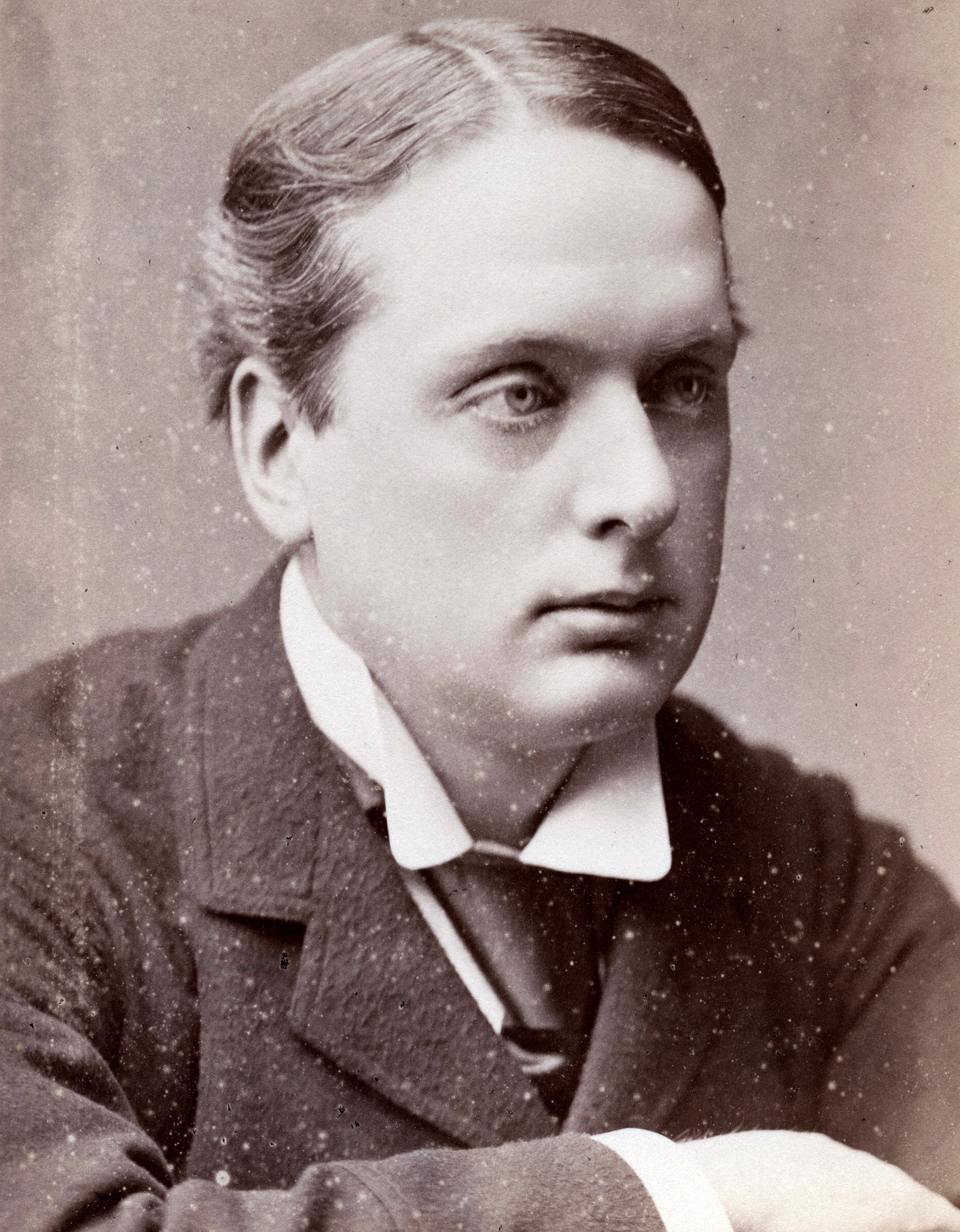
The 5th Earl of Rosebery, who purchased Seabreeze in 1893

In September she attempted to win the Lancashire Plate for the second year. The pre-race favourite was that year's Derby and St. Leger winner Donovan. Alicante was second in the betting at 9/2, with Seabreeze a 20/1 outsider. Seabreeze got away to a good start, but was soon overtaken by Chitabob and St. Patrick. As they turned for home Donovan had moved into second place, with Seabreeze in fifth. Donovan won the race by two lengths from Chitabob, with Seabreeze finishing in fourth. Chitabob and Donovan fought out the finish, with the latter come out on top and winning by two lengths. Alicante finished third, Pioneer fourth and Seabreeze fifth.

== Stud career ==
Baron Calthorpe retired Seabreeze to stud. After Calthorpe's death in 1893 she was purchased by Archibald Primrose, 5th Earl of Rosebery, for 3,600 guineas. As a broodmare, Seabreeze's foals included:

- Bride of the Sea – a chestnut filly sired by either Crafton or Trayles and foaled in 1892. She ran unplaced in the 1000 Guineas before finished third in the Prince of Wales's Stakes in 1895.
- Tom Cringle – a chestnut stallion sired by Donovan and foaled in 1895. He finished third in the City and Suburban Handicap at Epsom Downs in 1899, before winning the Ascot Stakes Handicap at Royal Ascot. Later in the season he finished third in the Jockey Club Cup.
- Sailor Lad – a bay stallion sired by Ladas and foaled in 1897. He finished seventh in both the 2000 Guineas and the Derby, before finishing fourth in the St. Leger.
- Lascaris – a bay colt sired by Ladas and foaled in 1898. He finished third in the Princess of Wales's Stakes in 1902.
- Admiral Breeze – a chestnut stallion sired by Velasquez and foaled in 1901. He did not race as a two-year-old, but as a three-year-old in 1904 he won the Newmarket Stakes and Tudor Plate. After retiring from racing he was sent to Hungary to stand as a stallion.
- Vasco – a stallion sired by Velasquez and foaled in 1902. He ran Newmarket Oaks winner Glastonbury to a dead heat in the Liverpolitan Plate. He was later exported to New Zealand to stand at stud.

Seabreeze died on 22 April 1909 after foaling.

== Pedigree ==
Pedigree of Seabreeze, chestnut mare, 1885
Sire Isonomy (GB) b.1875	Sterling (GB) b. 1868	Oxford ch. 1857	Birdcatcher
Sire Isonomy (GB) b.1875	Sterling (GB) b. 1868	Oxford ch. 1857	Honey Dear
Sire Isonomy (GB) b.1875	Sterling (GB) b. 1868	Whisper b. 1857	Flatcatcher
Sire Isonomy (GB) b.1875	Sterling (GB) b. 1868	Whisper b. 1857	Silence
Sire Isonomy (GB) b.1875	Isola Bella (GB) ch. 1868	Stockwell* ch. 1849	The Baron
Sire Isonomy (GB) b.1875	Isola Bella (GB) ch. 1868	Stockwell* ch. 1849	Pocahontas
Sire Isonomy (GB) b.1875	Isola Bella (GB) ch. 1868	Isoline ch. 1860	Ethelbert
Sire Isonomy (GB) b.1875	Isola Bella (GB) ch. 1868	Isoline ch. 1860	Bassishaw
Dam St Marguerite (GB) ch. 1879	Hermit (GB) ch. 1864	Newminster b. 1848	Touchstone*
Dam St Marguerite (GB) ch. 1879	Hermit (GB) ch. 1864	Newminster b. 1848	Beeswing
Dam St Marguerite (GB) ch. 1879	Hermit (GB) ch. 1864	Seclusion b. 1857	Tadmor
Dam St Marguerite (GB) ch. 1879	Hermit (GB) ch. 1864	Seclusion b. 1857	Miss Selon
Dam St Marguerite (GB) ch. 1879	Devotion (GB) ch. 1869	Stockwell* ch. 1849	The Baron
Dam St Marguerite (GB) ch. 1879	Devotion (GB) ch. 1869	Stockwell* ch. 1849	Pocahontas
Dam St Marguerite (GB) ch. 1879	Devotion (GB) ch. 1869	Alcestis bl. 1860	Touchstone*
Dam St Marguerite (GB) ch. 1879	Devotion (GB) ch. 1869	Alcestis bl. 1860	Sacrifice

Note: b. = Bay, bl. = Black, ch. = Chestnut

* Seabreeze was inbred 3x3 to Stockwell. This means that the stallion appears twice in the third generation of his pedigree. She was also inbred 4x4 to Touchstone.
