= Lancashire Plate =

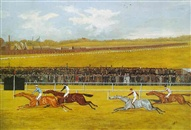
- Painting by James Walsham Baldock showing Seabreeze winning the first running of the Lancashire Plate
- Class: Horse
- Location: Manchester Racecourse; Manchester, England
- Inaugurated: 1888
- Race type: Flat / Thoroughbred

Race information
- Distance: 1888-91: 7 fur (1,408 m); 1892-93: 1 mile (1609 m)
- Surface: Turf
- Qualification: Two-years-old and up
- Weight: 7 st 5 lb (2 yo); 9 st 3 lb (3 yo); 9 st 9 lb (4yo+); Allowances; 3 lb for fillies, mares and geldings Penalties; Various (see History)
- Purse: £11,000

The Lancashire Plate was a flat horse race in Great Britain open to Thoroughbreds aged two years and over. It was run over seven furlongs at Manchester Racecourse in September from 1888 to 1893. It was one of the most valuable races in the country and its winners included Classic victors Seabreeze, Donovan and La Fleche.

== History ==
The Lancashire Plate was first run on 22 September 1888 over seven furlongs at Manchester Racecourse. The prize money was made up of £11,000 added to a sweepstakes of £20 each. The weights were 7 st 5 lb for two-year-olds, 9 st 3 lb for three-year-olds and 9 st 9 lb for four-year-olds, with mares and geldings being allowed to carry 3 lb less. Horses that had won more than £1,000 (excluding handicaps) once had to carry a 4 lb penalty and winners of either £1,000 once or £2,000 twice had to carry a 7 lb penalty. Any horse who had won the 2000 Guineas, Derby or St. Leger had to carry an extra 10 lb. The purse was increased to £12,000 in 1889, but reduced back to £11,000 in 1890, when the subscription was reduced to £5. In 1892 the distance of the race was increased to one mile and the purse was reduced to 10,000 The prize money was reduced again to £8,000 in 1892. The Lancashire Plate was last run in 1893 and the following season was replaced by the Prince Edward Handicap worth £2,000.

== Records ==
Most successful horse:

- no horse won this race more than once

Leading jockey:

- no jockey won this race more than once

Leading owner (2 wins):

- 6th Duke of Portland – Donovan (1889), Raeburn (1893)

Fastest winning time (7 furlongs) – Seabreeze (1888), 1m 29.4s

Fastest winning time (1 mile) – Raeburn (1893), 1m 48.6s

Widest winning margin – La Fleche (1892), 3 lengths

Shortest winning margin – Signorina (1891), ½ length

Longest odds winner – Signorina (1891), 6/1

Shortest odds winner – Donovan (1889), 4/6

Most runners – 24 (1888)

Fewest runners – 4 (1893)

== Winners ==
| Year | Winner | Age | Jockey | Trainer | Owner | Time | Ref. |
|---|---|---|---|---|---|---|---|
| 1888 | Seabreeze | 3 | William Robinson | James Jewitt | 5th Baron Calthorpe | 1:29.4 | |
| 1889 | Donovan | 3 | Fred Barrett | George Dawson | 6th Duke of Portland | 1:39.2 | |
| 1890 | Amphion | 4 | Tom Cannon | Mr. Chandler | General Byrne | 1:29.8 | |
| 1891 | Signorina | 4 | Fred Webb | Chevalier Ginistrelli | Chevalier Ginistrelli | 1:34.8 | |
| 1892 | La Fleche | 3 | George Barrett | John Porter | Baron de Hirsch | 1:50.2 | |
| 1893 | Raeburn | 3 | John Watts | | 6th Duke of Portland | 1:48.6 | |

== See also ==
- Horseracing in Great Britain
- List of British flat horse races
