= Siffleuse =

British-bred Thoroughbred racehorse

- Sire: Saraband
- Grandsire: Muncaster
- Dam: Assay
- Damsire: Sterling
- Sex: Mare
- Foaled: 1890
- Country: United Kingdom
- Colour: Chestnut
- Breeder: J. Best
- Owner: John Blundell Maple
- Trainer: Percy Peck
- Record: 6: 2-2-1

Major wins
- 1000 Guineas (1893); Yorkshire Oaks (1893)

Siffleuse (1890–1908) was a British Thoroughbred racehorse and broodmare. She showed promising form as a two-year-old in 1892 but failed to win a race. In the following spring she recorded a huge upset when she won the 1000 Guineas at odds of 33/1. She went on to win the Yorkshire Oaks and finish second in the Park Hill Stakes and was retired from racing at the end of 1894. She had some success in a brief breeding career.

== Background ==
Siffleuse was a chestnut mare bred in England by J. Best. As a yearling the filly was auctioned and bought for 1,000 guineas by John Blundell Maple who sent her to his private trainer Percy Peck at the Falmouth House stable in Newmarket. She was originally named La Belle Siffleuse possibly after Alice J. Shaw, a famous whistler of the time. Another, possibly complementary, explanation for her name was that she had respiratory problems which led to her "roaring" or making a whistling noise when galloping.

Her sire Saraband was a very fast horse who won the New Stakes and Imperial Produce Stakes as a two-year-old in 1885. In 1896 he was exported to Germany where he sired the Grosser Preis von Baden winner Faust. Siffleuse's dam Assay was a granddaughter of Lady Elizabeth, the foundation mare of Thoroughbred family 8-j.

== Racing career ==
=== 1892: two-year-old season ===
La Belle Siffleuse was highly regarded as a juvenile in 1892 but failed to win a race. Her most high-profile contest was the £1,800 Breeders' Foal Stakes over five furlongs at Manchester Racecourse on 9 June when she started at odds of 3/1 and finished third of the nine runners behind Hautbrion and Emita, beaten more than two lengths by the winner.

=== 1893: three-year-old season ===
On 5 May 1893 Siffleuse, ridden by Tommy Loates, started a 33/1 outsider for the 80th running of the 1000 Guineas over the Rowley Mile at Newmarket Racecourse. Dame President, also owned by John Blundell Maple, started the 3/1 favourite while the other fancied runners were Evermore, Silene, the 6th Duke of Portland's The Prize, Lord Rosebery's Tressure and Captain Machell's Halma. Blundell Maple did not "declare to win" with either of his fillies but it was assumed that Siffleuse had been entered to set the pace for Dame President: Percy Peck reportedly told Loates "Your mount will stop after going five furlongs. Of course you must win if you can". Siffleuse started well and led the field up the centre of the course until half way when she was passed by her more fancied stablemate, but despite having fulfilled her apparent role as pacemaker she remained in close contention and engaged in the struggle for second place with Silene and Tressure. Inside the final furlong, however, Dame President, who had looked certain to win, began to tire badly and stopped almost to a walk. Amid "indescribable uproar" Siffleuse produced a strong late rally to regain the advantage in the final strides and win by a head, with Tressure a length and a half back in third place. The result was described as "one of the most prodigious surprises" in the history of British racing.

Siffleuse did not contest the Oaks Stakes and reappeared in the Yorkshire Oaks over one and a half miles in August. Ridden by Watts she started joint favourite alongside Queen of Navarre and won very easily by six lengths. At Doncaster Racecourse in September Siffleuse bypassed the St Leger for the Park Hill Stakes and started second favourite behind Tressure, who had finished runner-up in the Oaks. With Watts again in the saddle she came home second, beaten two lengths by Self Sacrifice, to whom she was conceding seven pounds in weight.

=== 1894: four-year-old season ===
On 4 May 1894, Siffleuse returned to the track for the £3,000 Great Jubilee Handicap over one mile at Kempton Park Racecourse for which she was assigned a weight of 108 pound. Ridden by Walter Bradford, she stated the 6/1 favourite in a 22-runner field but ran unplaced behind Avington. At Epsom Racecourse a month later she was one of the outsiders in an eleven-runner field for the Epsom Plate but exceeded expectations as she finished second to Chin Chin under a weight of 125 pounds.

== Breeding record ==
Siffleuse was retired to become a broodmare for her owner's stud at the end of her third season of racing. She produced nine foals:

- Royal Whistle, a bay colt, foaled in 1896, sired by Royal Hampton. Won the Hopeful Stakes.
- Royal Special, a chestnut colt, foaled in 1897, sired by Royal Hampton.
- Royal Summons, bay filly, 1898, by Royal Hampton. Won Nassau Stakes.
- Persiflage, bay colt, 1899, by Persimmon.
- Royal Singer, chestnut filly, foaled in 1900, sired by Royal Hampton.
- Whistling Lass, bay filly, foaled in 1902, sired by Childwick. Sent to Australia.
- Bosco, chestnut gelding, foaled in 1903, sired by Royal Hampton.
- Royal Szeidi, bay colt, foaled in 1904, sired by Mackintosh.
- Sifflet, colt, foaled in Belgium in 1906, sired by Royal Dragoon.

Siffleuse was exported to Belgium in 1904 with her foal by Mackintosh. She did not produce a foal in 1905 or 1907. Siffleuse died in 1908 at the stud of M. F. Dufour.

== Pedigree ==
Pedigree of Siffleuse (GB), chestnut mare, 1890
Sire Saraband (GB) 1883	Muncaster; 1877	Doncaster	Stockwell
Sire Saraband (GB) 1883	Muncaster; 1877	Doncaster	Marigold
Sire Saraband (GB) 1883	Muncaster; 1877	Windermere	Macaroni
Sire Saraband (GB) 1883	Muncaster; 1877	Windermere	Miss Agnes
Sire Saraband (GB) 1883	Highland Fling; 1869	Scottish Chief	Lord of the Isles
Sire Saraband (GB) 1883	Highland Fling; 1869	Scottish Chief	Miss Ann
Sire Saraband (GB) 1883	Highland Fling; 1869	Masquerade	Lambourn
Sire Saraband (GB) 1883	Highland Fling; 1869	Masquerade	Burlesque
Dam Assay (GB) 1880	Sterling; 1868	Oxford	Birdcatcher (IRE)
Dam Assay (GB) 1880	Sterling; 1868	Oxford	Honey Dear
Dam Assay (GB) 1880	Sterling; 1868	Whisper	Flatcatcher
Dam Assay (GB) 1880	Sterling; 1868	Whisper	Silence
Dam Assay (GB) 1880	Lady Highthorn; 1865	Stockwell	The Baron (IRE)
Dam Assay (GB) 1880	Lady Highthorn; 1865	Stockwell	Pocahontas
Dam Assay (GB) 1880	Lady Highthorn; 1865	Lady Elizabeth (Family: 8-j)	Sleight of Hand
Dam Assay (GB) 1880	Lady Highthorn; 1865	Lady Elizabeth (Family: 8-j)	Margrave mare

- Siffleuse was inbred 3 × 4 to Stockwell, meaning that this stallion appears in both the third and fourth generations of her pedigree.
