= Ayrshire (horse) =

British-bred Thoroughbred racehorse

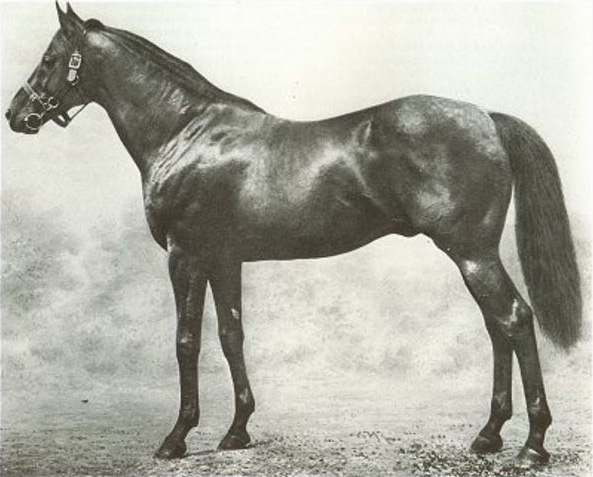
- Sire: Hampton
- Grandsire: Lord Clifden
- Dam: Atalanta
- Damsire: Galopin
- Sex: Stallion
- Foaled: 1885
- Country: United Kingdom of Great Britain and Ireland
- Colour: Bay
- Breeder: William Cavendish-Bentinck, 6th Duke of Portland
- Owner: William Cavendish-Bentinck, 6th Duke of Portland
- Trainer: George Dawson
- Record: 16: 11-1-3

Major wins
- Champagne Stakes (1887); 2000 Guineas (1888); Epsom Derby (1888); Royal Stakes (1889); Eclipse Stakes (1889)

Ayrshire (1885–1910) was a British Thoroughbred racehorse and sire. In a career that lasted from 1887 to 1889 he ran sixteen times and won eleven races. After winning five races as a two-year-old he became the leading British three-year-old colt of 1888 when he won the 2000 Guineas at Newmarket and the Derby at Epsom. He failed in his bid to win the English Triple Crown when beaten in the St Leger at Doncaster but returned in 1889 for a successful campaign which included a win in the Eclipse Stakes at Sandown. He was retired to stud at the end of the year and had a modestly successful career as a stallion. He died in 1910.

== Background ==
Ayrshire was a dark-coated bay, praised for his “beauty” and “symmetry”, bred by his owner William Cavendish-Bentinck, 6th Duke of Portland a Conservative politician and landowner. Among the Duke’s other horses were the undefeated St. Simon and the 1889 Derby winner Donovan. He was sent into training with George Dawson at his Heath House Stable in Newmarket, Suffolk.

Ayrshire's sire, Hampton was a successful stayer who won both the Goodwood Cup and the Doncaster Cup. Hampton was Champion sire in 1887 and sired, in addition to Ayrshire, the Derby winners Ladas and Merry Hampton as well as the influential sires Bay Ronald and Royal Hampton. Ayrshire’s dam Atalanta, who had once been sold for half a Crown, was a successful racehorse who went on to produce several good winners including the St. James's Palace Stakes winner Troon.

== Racing career ==
=== 1887: two-year-old season ===
Ayrshire made his debut in the £5,000 Whitsuntide Plate over five furlongs at Manchester for which he was made 5/2 favourite. In a “splendid race” run in thick mist Ayrshire finished third, beaten a neck and a head by the filly Briar-root who went on to win the 1000 Guineas in 1888, and an unnamed ”Ellangowan colt” (later named Caerlaverock). He was then sent to Royal Ascot for the New Stakes in which he finished third to the year’s leading two-year-old Friar's Balsam and the filly Seabreeze.

In the next three months, Ayrshire won five successive races. Before the end of June he had won the Bibury Home-bred Foal Plate by three quarters of a length from Challenge, and the Royal Plate at Windsor. At Newmarket in July, he started evens favourite for the Chesterfield Stakes, and produced a strong finish to beat Bartizan by half a length; later that month won the “Prince of Wales Stakes” at Goodwood. At Doncaster in September he won the Champagne Stakes but sustained an injury which kept him off the racecourse for the remainder of the season.

=== 1888: three-year-old season ===
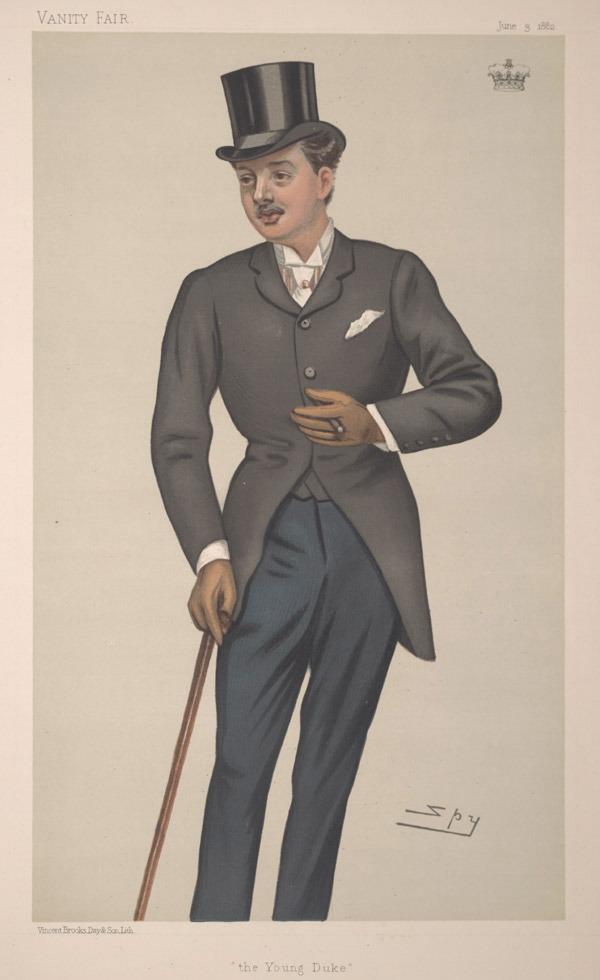
6th Duke of Portland, Ayrshire's owner and breeder

Although Friar’s Balsam was perceived as by far the best colt of his generation, Ayrshire who had thrived over the winter was regarded by some observers as a potential Derby winner. Ayrshire began his three-year-old season in the Riddlesworth Stakes at Newmarket, which he won by twenty lengths from his only opponent. In the 2000 Guineas on Ayrshire was started at 8/1 in a field of six but Friar’s Balsam was considered such a certainty that many bookmakers refused to accept bets on the favourite. Friar’s Balsam was, however, suffering from an undetected mouth abscess which burst during the race, causing him to choke on “blood and matter”. Ayrshire, ridden by the fifty-five-year-old veteran John Osborne, tracked his stable companion Johnny Morgan before moving into the lead a furlong out and winning “in a common canter” by two lengths. Johnny Morgan held off Orbit for second, while Friar’s Balsam finished distressed in fifth. Immediately following the race Ayrshire’s price for the Derby was cut from 7/1 to 6/4.

At Epsom on 30 May Ayrshire started 5/6 favourite for the Derby in a field of nine, in front of a crowd estimated at 150,000. His owner, the Duke of Portland watched the race from the Royal Box in the company of the Prince of Wales. Ayrshire broke quickly but was then held up and settled in fourth by his rider Fred Barrett. Van Dieman’s Land went to the front at half way and held a clear lead turning into the straight as Barrett moved Ayrshire into contention. Two furlongs from the finish, Ayrshire took the lead from Orbit and Van Dieman’s Land. He quickly went clear and held off the strong late challenge of Crowberry to win by two lengths, despite swerving near the finish. The official time of 2:43 equalled the race record, although the Sporting Life timed the winner at 2:42.2.

Shortly after the Derby Ayrshire was found to be lame as a result of a splint and was off the racecourse for more than three months. He started favourite for the St Leger on 12 September against fifteen opponents, with his biggest danger appearing to be Seabreeze, who had won The Oaks. Ayrshire raced prominently and was moved up to challenge Seabreeze for the lead early in the straight. He soon weakened however, suggesting a lack of stamina, and dropped back to finish sixth, as the filly won easily. Ten days later Ayrshire ran over the much shorter distance of seven furlongs in the £10,000 Lancashire Plate at Manchester Racecourse. Looking fitter than he had done at Doncaster, he produced a much better effort, leading the field of twenty-four runners until headed by Seabreeze well inside the final furlong. Ayrshire "struggled gamely" but was beaten three quarters of a length in a finish of "intense excitement." Ayrshire reappeared at Newmarket three days later for his final start of the year, and won the Great Foal Plate, beating the Doncaster Cup winner Grafton.

=== 1889: four-year-old season ===
Ayrshire ran only three times in 1889, but won two of the season's most valuable prizes. On his four-year-old debut on 11 May Ayrshire faced a strong field, including Friar's Balsam (who started odds-on favourite) and Seabreeze in the £10,000 Royal Stakes at Kempton Park. Ridden by Jack Watts, Ayrshire took the lead turning into the straight as Friar's Balsam dropped away, but he was soon challenged by Seabreeze. The two leaders pulled well clear of the remainder, with Ayrshire holding off the filly's sustained challenge to win comfortably by a length.

On 19 July he faced Seabreeze again in the third running of the £10,000 Eclipse Stakes at Sandown, for which he started 4/5 favorite. He won "in a canter" by about two lengths, beating the three-year-olds El Dorado and Seclusion with Seabreeze well beaten. In the Champion Stakes at Newmarket in October Ayrshire was beaten into third place by the three-year-old Gold in one of the "chief surprises" of the year. It transpired that he had been injured in the race and was retired to stud.

== Stud career ==
Ayrshire was retired to his owners stud at Egerton House, Newmarket. He was a modest success as a stallion, being particularly effective as a sire of fillies. His best progeny included the Oaks winners Airs and Graces and Our Lassie and the important broodmares Gas and Glare. His best colt may have been Bowling Brook, who raced in the United States, where his wins included the Belmont Stakes and the Metropolitan Handicap. Ayrshire was put down on 30 March 1910.

== Sire line tree ==
- Ayrshire
  - Ayr Laddie
  - Symington
    - Junior
      - Arminio
  - Kilkerrin
    - Expectation
  - Heir Male
  - Bowling Brook
  - Solitaire
  - Cossack
  - Doctrine
  - Robert Le Diable
    - Wrack
      - Blazes
      - Little Chief
      - Petee Wrack
        - Brother Jones
        - Peterski
        - Pine Pep
  - Airlie
    - Martial
      - Cri de Guerre
  - Airship
  - Festino
    - Festtarok
    - Orelio
    - Antinous
    - Amorino
    - Pergolese
      - Augias
  - Traquair
    - Woorak
      - Accarak
      - Prince Woorak
      - Salrak
      - Soorak
      - Sir Andrew
      - Whittier
      - Yanda
      - Sandringham
      - Rakwool

== Pedigree ==
Pedigree of Ayrshire (GB), bay stallion, 1885
| Sire Hampton (GB) 1872 | Lord Clifden; 1860 | Newminster | Touchstone* |
| Sire Hampton (GB) 1872 | Lord Clifden; 1860 | Newminster | Beeswing* |
| Sire Hampton (GB) 1872 | Lord Clifden; 1860 | The Slave | Melbourne |
| Sire Hampton (GB) 1872 | Lord Clifden; 1860 | The Slave | Volley |
| Sire Hampton (GB) 1872 | Lady Langden; 1868 | Kettledrum | Rataplan |
| Sire Hampton (GB) 1872 | Lady Langden; 1868 | Kettledrum | Hybla |
| Sire Hampton (GB) 1872 | Lady Langden; 1868 | Haricot | Lanercost |
| Sire Hampton (GB) 1872 | Lady Langden; 1868 | Haricot | Queen Mary |
| Dam Atalanta (GB) 1878 | Galopin; 1872 | Vedette | Voltigeur |
| Dam Atalanta (GB) 1878 | Galopin; 1872 | Vedette | Mrs Ridgway |
| Dam Atalanta (GB) 1878 | Galopin; 1872 | Flying Duchess | The Flying Dutchman |
| Dam Atalanta (GB) 1878 | Galopin; 1872 | Flying Duchess | Merope |
| Dam Atalanta (GB) 1878 | Feronia; 1868 | Thormanby | Windhound |
| Dam Atalanta (GB) 1878 | Feronia; 1868 | Thormanby | Alice Hawthorn |
| Dam Atalanta (GB) 1878 | Feronia; 1868 | Woodbine | Stockwell |
| Dam Atalanta (GB) 1878 | Feronia; 1868 | Woodbine | Honeysuckle* (Family: 8-h) |

* Ayrshire is inbred 4S x 5D to the stallion Touchstone, meaning that he appears fourth generation on the sire side of his pedigree, and fifth generation (via Honeysuckle) on the dam side of his pedigree.

* Ayrshire is inbred 4S x 5D to the mare Beeswing, meaning that she appears fourth generation on the sire side of his pedigree, and fifth generation (via Honeysuckle) on the dam side of his pedigree.
