= Fred Barrett (jockey) =

English horse racing jockey

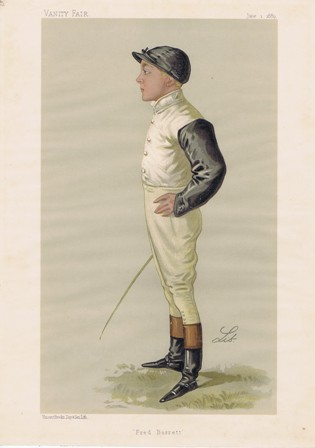
- Caricature of Fred Barrett from Vanity Fair, 1 June 1889

Personal information
- Born: 1867 Metfield, Suffolk
- Died: 21 January 1895 Newmarket Suffolk, England
- Occupation: Jockey

Horse racing career
- Sport: Horse racing

Major racing wins
- British Classic Race wins as jockey: Epsom Derby (1888); St Leger Stakes (1889)

Racing awards
- British flat racing Champion Jockey (1888)

Significant horses
- Ayrshire and Donovan

Frederick John Barrett (1867 – 21 January 1895) was an English horse racing jockey. His greatest success came in 1888, when he won The Derby and the Jockeys' Championship.

His career is summed up by two top class racehorses – Ayrshire and Donovan – which he rode in their championship years of 1888 and 1889.

He rode Ayrshire in the 1888 Derby, even though the veteran John Osborne had ridden him to victory in the 2,000 Guineas. He won, but only after nearly throwing the race away. While going clear, he jabbed Ayrshire on one side only with his spurs, causing the horse to veer wildly and nearly give the race away.

The same year, he began his association with Donovan, winning the Norfolk Stakes and a Dewhurst Stakes/Middle Park Stakes double at Newmarket. Donovan finished the year champion juvenile. Much was therefore expected of him as a three-year-old, and it was with great hopes of success that Barrett took the ride on him in the first colts' classic of the following season – the 2,000 Guineas. By all reports, he took it too easily on the colt, resulting in a defeat which ultimately cost him the Triple Crown. He could not ride Donovan in the Derby, since he was contracted to ride for Leopold de Rothschild. That honour went to Tommy Loates. He did, however, make amends for his Guineas defeat by winning the third leg of the Triple Crown, the St. Leger

Other races Barrett won during his career were the Eclipse Stakes, Cambridgeshire Handicap, Royal Hunt Cup and Prince of Wales's Stakes.

He had an elder brother George, who was also a jockey.

== Major Wins ==
(United Kingdom) Great Britain

=== Classic Races ===
- Derby – Ayrshire (1888)
- St. Leger – Donovan (1889)
