= Tommy Loates =

English jockey (1867–1910)

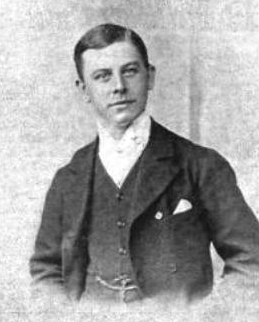
- In The Sketch, 27 March 1895

Personal information
- Born: 6 October 1867 Derby, Derbyshire, England
- Died: 28 September 1910 (aged 42) Brighton, Sussex, England
- Occupation: Jockey

Horse racing career
- Sport: Horse racing

Major racing wins
- British Classic Race wins as jockey: 1,000 Guineas; 2000 Guineas (2); Epsom Derby (2); St Leger Stakes

Racing awards
- British flat racing Champion Jockey 3 times (1889, 1890, 1893)

Significant horses
- Isinglass, Donovan, St. Frusquin

Thomas Loates (6 October 1867 – 28 September 1910) was a three times British flat racing Champion Jockey and one of only seven jockeys to have won more than 200 races in a season in Great Britain. He won the English Triple Crown on Isinglass in 1892, as well as individual Classics on Donovan (1889 Derby) (for which he was a last-minute booking), Siffleuse (1893 1,000 Guineas) and St. Frusquin (1896 2,000 Guineas). On Isinglass, he also won the 1894 Eclipse and 1895 Ascot Gold Cup and he had another top class win on Desmond in Newmarket's July Stakes in 1898.

== Life ==
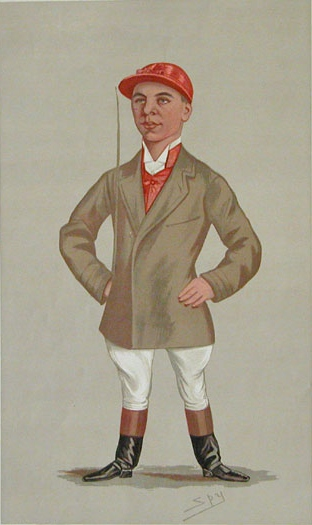
Caricature in Vanity Fair, 4 October 1890

Tommy Loates was born in Derby on 6 October 1867. He was regarded as the best of a family of four jockey brothers which included fellow Classic-winner, Sam Loates.

He was apprenticed to Joseph Cannon at Newmarket and was known as "a good lightweight, with very good hands". For Donovan's Derby win, he weighed just 6 1/2 stone. Loates once narrowly escaped death when falling in the Liverpool Cup on Lord Derby's race mare Birch Rod. He was also badly injured in a fall at Manchester and later married the nurse who tended him. A low point for Loates came in 1891 when his licence to ride was withdrawn by the Jockey Club for his involvement in betting, but he was reinstated the following year.

He died in Brighton, England on 28 September 1910, leaving $1,250,000 in property. It was believed he had amassed this phenomenal sum ($31.8 million in 2013 prices) because his later employer was the financier Leopold de Rothschild who looked after his investments.

Brighton & Hove bus number 415 was named in honour of him.
