= Eclipse Stakes =

Flat horse race in Britain

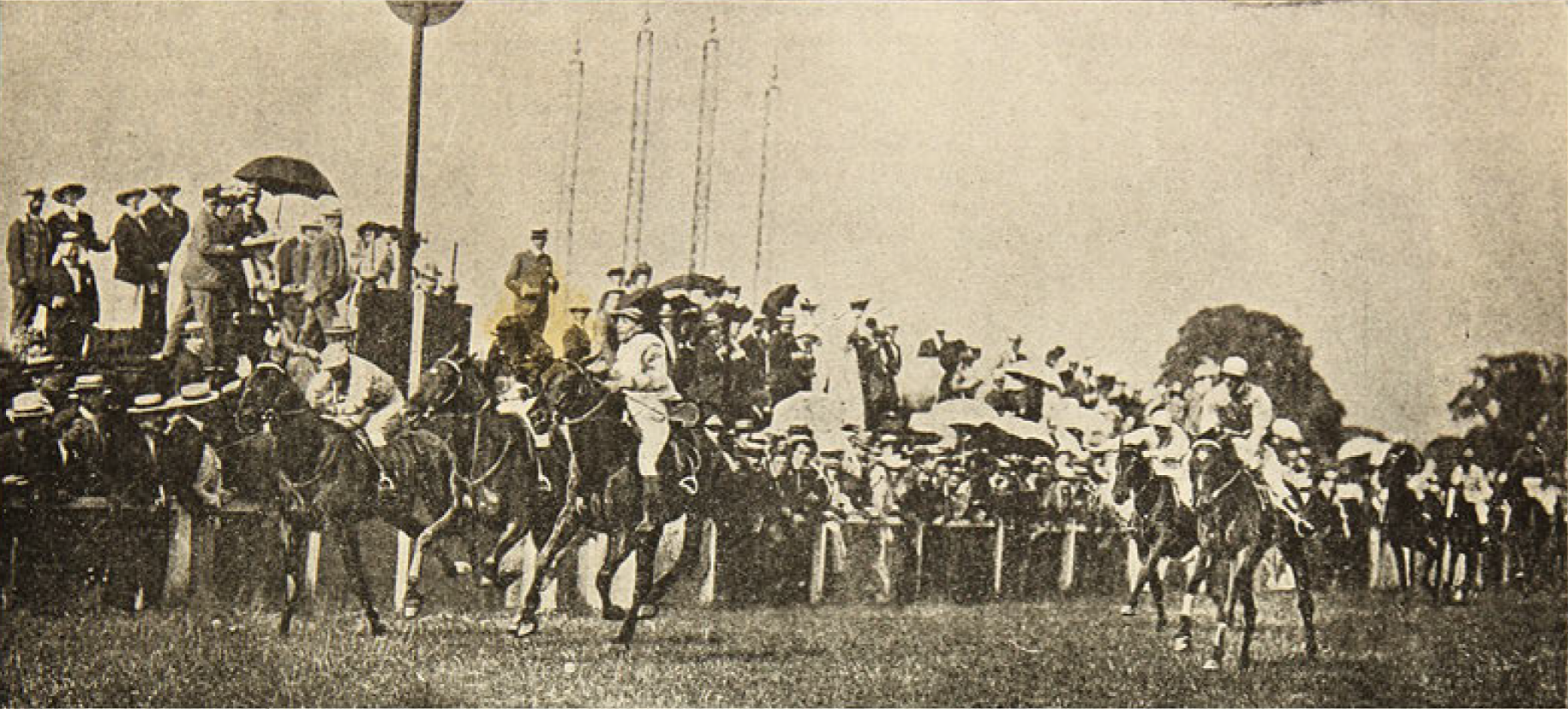
- Epsom Lad (third from left) winning the 1901 running
- Class: Group 1
- Location: Sandown Park; Esher, England
- Inaugurated: 1886
- Race type: Flat / Thoroughbred
- Sponsor: Coral
- Website: Sandown Park

Race information
- Distance: 1m 1f 209y (2,002 m)
- Surface: Turf
- Track: Right-handed
- Qualification: Three-years-old and up
- Weight: 8 st 13 lb (3yo); 9 st 9 lb (4yo+); Allowances; 3 lb for fillies and mares
- Purse: £1,000,000 (2025); 1st: £567,100

Eclipse Stakes
2026
Constitution River	A Boy Named Susie	Hawk Mountain

Previous years
2025
Delacroix	Ombudsman	Ruling Court
2024
City Of Troy	Al Riffa	Ghostwriter
2023
Paddington	Emily Upjohn	West Wind Blows
2022
Vadeni	Mishriff	Native Trail
2021
St Mark's Basilica	Addeybb	Mishriff

2020-2011
2020
Ghaiyyath	Enable	Japan
2019
Enable	Magical	Regal Reality
2018
Roaring Lion	Saxon Warrior	Cliffs Of Moher
2017
Ulysses	Barney Roy	Desert Encounter
2016
Hawkbill	The Gurkha	Time Test
2015
Golden Horn	The Grey Gatsby	Western Hymn
2014
Mukhadram	Trading Leather	Somewhat
2013
Al Kazeem	Declaration Of War	Mukhadram
2012
Nathaniel	Farhh	Twice Over
2011
So You Think	Workforce	Sri Putra

2010-2001
2010
Twice Over	Sri Putra	Viscount Nelson
2009
Sea The Stars	Rip Van Winkle	Conduit
2008
Mount Nelson	Phoenix Tower	Pipedreamer
2007
Notnowcato	Authorized	George Washington
2006
David Junior	Notnowcato	Blue Monday
2005
Oratorio	Motivator	Altieri
2004
Refuse To Bend	Warrsan	Kalaman
2003
Falbrav	Nayef	Kaieteur
2002
Hawk Wing	Sholokhov	Equerry
2001
Medicean	Grandera	Bach

2000-1991
2000
Giant's Causeway	Kalanisi	Shiva
1999
Compton Admiral	Xaar	Fantastic Light
1998
Daylami	Faithful Son	Central Park
1997
Pilsudski	Benny The Dip	Bosra Sham
1996
Halling	Bijou d'Inde	Pentire
1995
Halling	Singspiel	Red Bishop
1994
Ezzoud	Bob's Return	Erhaab
1993
Opera House	Misil	Tenby
1992
Kooyonga	Opera House	Sapience
1991
Environment Friend	Stagecraft	Sanglamore

1990-1981
1990
Elmaamul	Terimon	Ile De Chypre
1989
Nashwan	Opening Verse	Indian Skimmer
1988
Mtoto	Shady Heights	Triptych
1987
Mtoto	Reference Point	Triptych
1986
Dancing Brave	Triptych	Teleprompter
1985
Pebbles	Rainbow Quest	Bob Back
1984
Sadler's Wells	Time Charter	Morcon
1983
Solford	Muscatite	Tolomeo
1982
Kalaglow	Lobkowiez	Rocamadour
1981
Master Willie	Vielle	Fingal's Cave

1980-1971
1980
Ela-Mana-Mou	Hello Gorgeous	Gregorian
1979
Dickens Hill	Crimson Beau	Northern Baby
1978
Gunner B	Balmerino	Radetzky
1977
Artaius	Lucky Wednesday	Arctic Tern
1976
Wollow	Radetzky	Anne's Pretender
1975
Star Appeal	Taros	Royal Manacle
1974
Coup de Feu	Ksar	Mount Hagen
1973
Scottish Rifle	Moulton	Sun Prince
1972
Brigadier Gerard	Gold Rod	Home Guard
1971
Mill Reef	Caro	Welsh Pageant

1970-1963
1970
Connaught	Karabas	Nor
1969
Wolver Hollow	Park Top	Hogarth
1968
Royal Palace	Taj Dewan	Sir Ivor
1967
Busted	Great Nephew	Appiani
1966
Pieces of Eight	Ballyciptic	Pretendre
1965
Canisbay	Roan Rocket	Red Vagabonde
1964
Ragusa	Baldric	Tarqogan
1963
Khalkis	Miralgo	Tang

The Eclipse Stakes is a Group 1 flat horse race in Great Britain open to horses aged three years or older. It is run at Sandown Park over a distance of 1 mile, 1 furlong and 209 yards (2,002 metres), and it is scheduled to take place each year in early July.

== History ==
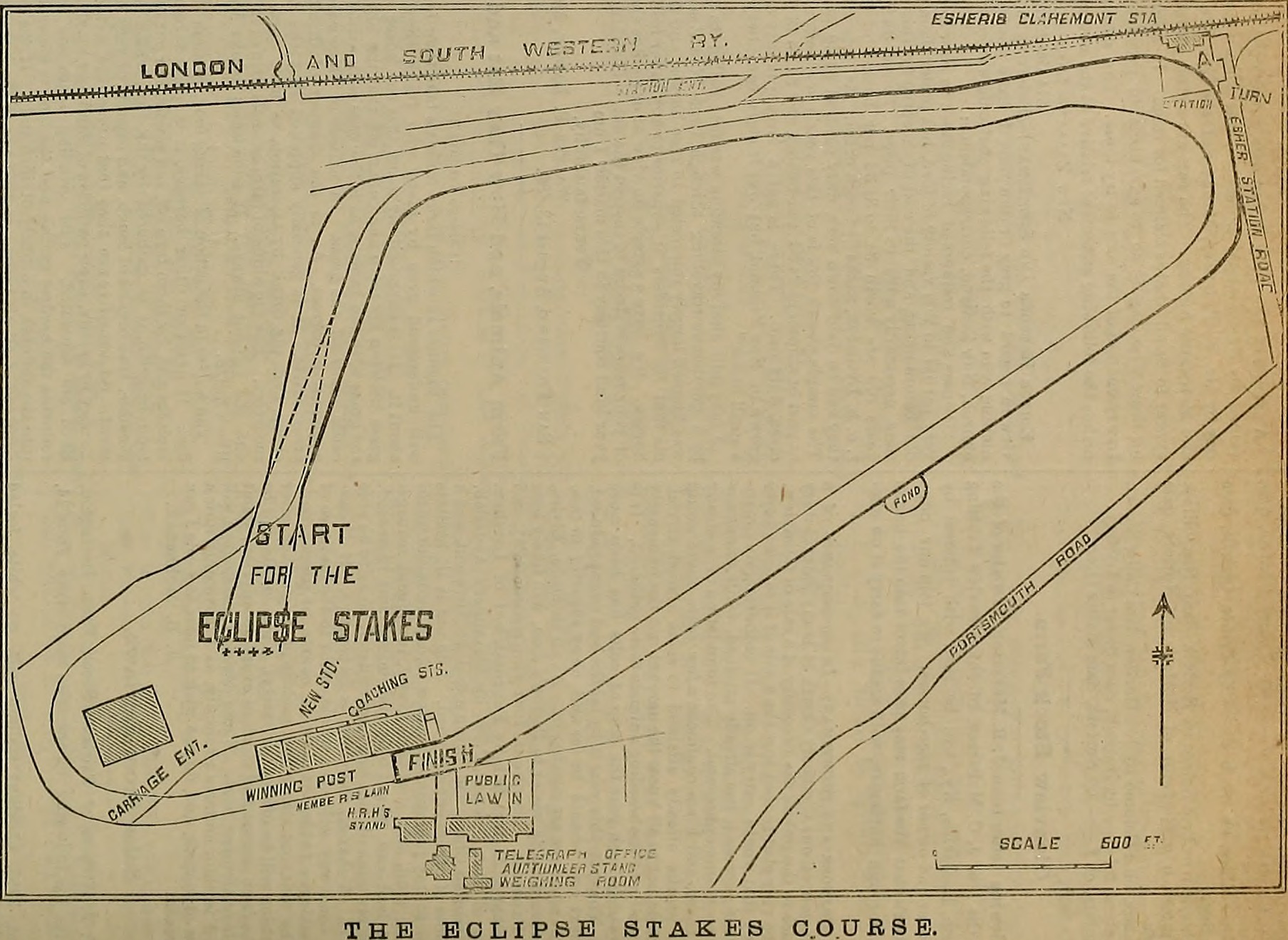
Map of the racecourse (1886)

The event is named after Eclipse, a celebrated 18th-century racehorse. It was established in 1886, and the inaugural running was won by Bendigo. At that time, it was Britain's richest ever race. The prize fund of £10,000 was donated by Leopold de Rothschild at the request of General Owen Williams, a co-founder of Sandown Park.

The Eclipse Stakes was contested by high-quality fields from its inception. It was won by Ayrshire, the previous year's Derby winner, in 1889. The first three finishers in 1903– Ard Patrick, Sceptre and Rock Sand — had won seven Classics between them.

The race has been sponsored by Coral since 1976, and it is now familiarly known as the "Coral-Eclipse". The most recent Classic winner to achieve victory was City of Troy, the Epsom Derby winner, in 2024.

== Records ==
Most successful horse (2 wins):

- Orme – 1892, 1893
- Buchan – 1919, 1920
- Polyphontes – 1924, 1925
- Mtoto – 1987, 1988
- Halling – 1995, 1996

Leading jockey (7 wins):

- Lester Piggott – Mystery IX (1951), Darius (1955), Arctic Explorer (1957), St Paddy (1961), Pieces of Eight (1966), Wolver Hollow (1969), Artaius (1977)

Leading trainer (10 wins):

- Aidan O'Brien - Giant's Causeway (2000), Hawk Wing (2002), Oratorio (2005), Mount Nelson (2008), So You Think (2011), St Mark's Basilica (2021), Paddington (2023), City of Troy (2024), Delacroix (2025), Constitution River (2026)

Leading owner (10 wins): (includes part ownership)

- Sue Magnier – Giant's Causeway (2000), Hawk Wing (2002), Oratorio (2005), Mount Nelson (2008), So You Think (2011), St Mark's Basilica (2021), Paddington (2023), City of Troy (2024), Delacroix (2025), Constitution River (2026)

== Winners ==
The race was not run from 1915-1918 because of World War I and from 1940-1945 because of World War II.

Year	Winner	Age	Jockey	Trainer	Owner	Time
1886	Bendigo	6	Tom Cannon Sr.	Charles Jousiffe	H. T. Barclay	2:12.4
1888	Orbit	3	Tom Cannon Sr.	John Porter	1st Duke of Westminster	2:14.0
1889	Ayrshire	4	Fred Barrett	George Dawson	6th Duke of Portland	2:14.0
1891	Surefoot	4	John Liddiard	Garrret Moore	A W Merry	2:15.0
1892	Orme	3	George Barrett	John Porter	1st Duke of Westminster	2:15.0
1893	Orme	4	Morny Cannon	John Porter	1st Duke of Westminster	2:11.8
1894	Isinglass	4	Tommy Loates	James Jewitt	Harry McCalmont
1895	Le Justicier	3	Thomas French	William Webb	Baron Arthur de Schickler
1896	St. Frusquin	3	Tommy Loates	Alfred Hayhoe	Leopold de Rothschild
1897	Persimmon	4	John Watts	Richard Marsh	Prince of Wales
1898	Velasquez	4	Charles Wood	William Walters	5th Earl of Rosebery	2:11.40
1899	Flying Fox	3	Morny Cannon	John Porter	1st Duke of Westminster	2:12.60
1900	Diamond Jubilee	3	Herbert Jones	Richard Marsh	Prince of Wales	2:07.00
1901	Epsom Lad	4	Santiago Gomez	Luis Alvarez	James Buchanan	2:08.40
1902	Cheers	3	Danny Maher	Weston Goodwin	8th Duke of Devonshire	2:09.80
1903	Ard Patrick	4	Otto Madden	Sam Darling	John Gubbins
1904	Darley Dale	3	Danny Maher	John Porter	6th Duke of Portland
1905	Val d'Or	3	George Stern	Robert Denman	Edmond Blanc	2:09.80
1906	Llangibby	4	Danny Maher	Peter Gilpin	Ludwig Neumann
1907	Lally	4	Bernard Dillon	Tom Lewis	William Purefoy
1908	Your Majesty	3	Walter Griggs	Charles Morton	Jack Barnato Joel	2:15.60
1909	Bayardo	3	Danny Maher	Alec Taylor Jr.	Alfred W. Cox	2:18.80
1910 (dh)	Lemberg; Neil Gow	3; 3	Bernard Dillon; Danny Maher	Alec Taylor Jr. Percy Peck	Alfred W. Cox; 5th Earl of Rosebery
1911	Swynford	4	Frank Wootton	George Lambton	17th Earl of Derby	2:09.00
1912	Prince Palatine	4	Frank O'Neill	Henry Beardsley	Thomas Pilkington	2:12.20
1913	Tracery	4	Albert Whalley	John Watson	August Belmont Jr.	2:13.20
1914	Hapsburg	3	Cornelius Foy	William Halsey	Sir Ernest Cassel	2:11.20
1919	Buchan	3	Joe Childs	Alec Taylor Jr.	Waldorf Astor	2:11.60
1920	Buchan	4	Frank Bullock	Alec Taylor Jr.	2nd Viscount Astor	2:09.20
1921	Craig an Eran	3	Frank Bullock	Alec Taylor Jr.	2nd Viscount Astor	2:09.80
1922	Golden Myth	4	Charlie Elliott	Jack Jarvis	Sir George Bullough	2:13.00
1923	Saltash	3	Jack Brennan	Alec Taylor Jr.	2nd Viscount Astor	2:10.00
1924	Polyphontes	3	William McLachlan	Etienne L. de Mestre	Solomon Joel	2:09.40
1925	Polyphontes	4	Harry Wragg	Walter Earl	Solomon Joel	2:13.40
1926	Coronach	3	Joe Childs	Fred Darling	1st Baron Woolavington	2:09.80
1927	Colorado	4	Tommy Weston	Frank Butters	17th Earl of Derby	2:15.60
1928	Fairway	3	Tommy Weston	Frank Butters	17th Earl of Derby	2:09.60
1929	Royal Minstrel	4	Joe Childs	Cecil Boyd-Rochfort	John Hay Whitney	2:07.80
1930	Rustom Pasha	3	Harry Wragg	Dick Dawson	Aga Khan III	2:11.00
1931	Caerleon	4	Tommy Weston	George Lambton	17th Earl of Derby	2:14.40
1932	Miracle	3	Harry Wragg	Jack Jarvis	6th Earl of Rosebery	2:12.40
1933	Loaningdale	4	Joe Childs	Cecil Boyd-Rochfort	Guy Wilson	2:09.40
1934	King Salmon	4	Harry Wragg	Ossie Bell	Richard Brooke	2:06.80
1935	Windsor Lad	4	Charlie Smirke	Marcus Marsh	Martin Benson	2:13.80
1936	Rhodes Scholar	4	Bobby Dick	Joe Lawson	2nd Viscount Astor	2:11.40
1937	Boswell	4	Pat Beasley	Cecil Boyd-Rochfort	William Woodward Sr.	2:14.80
1938	Pasch	3	Gordon Richards	Fred Darling	Henry Morriss	2:12.00
1939	Blue Peter	3	Eph Smith	Jack Jarvis	6th Earl of Rosebery	2:13.80
1946	Gulf Stream	3	Harry Wragg	Walter Earl	17th Earl of Derby	2:11.20
1947	Migoli	3	Charlie Smirke	Frank Butters	Aga Khan III	2:10.80
1948	Petition	4	Ken Gethin	Frank Butters	Sir Alfred Butt	2:10.20
1949	Djeddah	4	Charlie Elliott	Charles Semblat	Marcel Boussac	2:08.20
1950	Flocon	4	Freddie Palmer	Percy Carter	Geoffroy de Waldner	2:10.80
1951	Mystery	3	Lester Piggott	Percy Carter	Mme Edward Esmond	2:10.20
1952	Tulyar	3	Charlie Smirke	Marcus Marsh	Aga Khan III	2:09.80
1953	Argur	4	Charlie Elliott	John Glynn	Marcel Boussac	2:09.00
1954	King of the Tudors	4	Ken Gethin	Willie Stephenson	Frank Dennis	2:12.40
1955	Darius	4	Lester Piggott	Harry Wragg	Sir Percy Loraine	2:09:00
1956	Tropique	4	Paul Blanc	Geoff Watson	Guy de Rothschild	2:15.80
1957	Arctic Explorer	3	Lester Piggott	Noel Murless	Giles Loder	2:12.60
1958	Ballymoss	4	Scobie Breasley	Vincent O'Brien	John McShain	2:08.60
1959	Saint Crespin	3	George Moore	Alec Head	Prince Aly Khan	2:10.80
1960	Javelot	4	Freddie Palmer	Percy Carter	Geoffroy de Waldner	2:14.80
1961	St Paddy	4	Lester Piggott	Noel Murless	Sir Victor Sassoon	2:06.50
1962	Henry the Seventh	4	Edward Hide	Bill Elsey	Jim Joel	2:07.40
1963	Khalkis	3	Garnie Bougoure	Paddy Prendergast	Viscount Elveden	2:10.60
1964	Ragusa	4	Garnie Bougoure	Paddy Prendergast	Jim Mullion	2:07.40
1965	Canisbay	4	Stan Clayton	Cecil Boyd-Rochfort	Queen Elizabeth II	2:07.30
1966	Pieces of Eight	3	Lester Piggott	Vincent O'Brien	Countess de la Valdène	2:08.90
1967	Busted	4	Bill Rickaby	Noel Murless	Stanhope Joel	2:07.70
1968	Royal Palace	4	Sandy Barclay	Noel Murless	Jim Joel	2:07.50
1969	Wolver Hollow	5	Lester Piggott	Henry Cecil	Hope Goddard Iselin	2:11.80
1970	Connaught	5	Sandy Barclay	Noel Murless	Jim Joel	2:06.00
1971	Mill Reef	3	Geoff Lewis	Ian Balding	Paul Mellon	2:05.40
1972	Brigadier Gerard	4	Joe Mercer	Dick Hern	Jean Hislop	2:20.20
1973 (Note: The 1973 running took place at Kempton Park)	Scottish Rifle	4	Ron Hutchinson	John Dunlop	Sandy Struthers	2:12.39
1974	Coup de Feu	5	Pat Eddery	Duncan Sasse	Tim Sasse	2:08.86
1975	Star Appeal	5	Greville Starkey	Theo Grieper	Waldemar Zeitelhack	2:06.10
1976	Wollow (Note: Trepan finished first in 1976, but he was later disqualified after testing positive for a banned substance)	3	Gianfranco Dettori	Henry Cecil	Carlo d'Alessio	2:05.42
1977	Artaius	3	Lester Piggott	Vincent O'Brien	Mrs George Getty II	2:05.30
1978	Gunner B	5	Joe Mercer	Henry Cecil	Pauline Barratt	2:05.05
1979	Dickens Hill	3	Tony Murray	Mick O'Toole	Mrs Jean-Pierre Binet	2:06.17
1980	Ela-Mana-Mou	4	Willie Carson	Dick Hern	Simon Weinstock	2:10.20
1981	Master Willie	4	Philip Waldron	Henry Candy	Robert Barnett	2:07.44
1982	Kalaglow	4	Greville Starkey	Guy Harwood	Tony Ward	2:08.83
1983	Solford	3	Pat Eddery	Vincent O'Brien	Robert Sangster	2:06.36
1984	Sadler's Wells	3	Pat Eddery	Vincent O'Brien	Robert Sangster	2:04.53
1985	Pebbles	4	Steve Cauthen	Clive Brittain	Sheikh Mohammed	2:07.33
1986	Dancing Brave	3	Greville Starkey	Guy Harwood	Khalid Abdullah	2:06.18
1987	Mtoto	4	Michael Roberts	Alec Stewart	Ahmed Al Maktoum	2:04.33
1988	Mtoto	5	Michael Roberts	Alec Stewart	Ahmed Al Maktoum	2:06.14
1989	Nashwan	3	Willie Carson	Dick Hern	Hamdan Al Maktoum	2:07.38
1990	Elmaamul	3	Willie Carson	Dick Hern	Hamdan Al Maktoum	2:04.63
1991	Environment Friend	3	George Duffield	James Fanshawe	Bill Gredley	2:07.61
1992	Kooyonga	4	Warren O'Connor	Michael Kauntze	Mitsuo Haga	2:10.83
1993	Opera House	5	Michael Kinane	Michael Stoute	Sheikh Mohammed	2:06.25
1994	Ezzoud	5	Walter Swinburn	Michael Stoute	Maktoum Al Maktoum	2:04.70
1995	Halling	4	Walter Swinburn	Saeed bin Suroor	Godolphin	2:05.32
1996	Halling	5	John Reid	Saeed bin Suroor	Godolphin	2:08.05
1997	Pilsudski	5	Michael Kinane	Michael Stoute	Lord Weinstock	2:12.51
1998	Daylami	4	Frankie Dettori	Saeed bin Suroor	Godolphin	2:06.82
1999	Compton Admiral	3	Darryll Holland	Gerard Butler	Erik Penser	2:06.42
2000	Giant's Causeway	3	George Duffield	Aidan O'Brien	Magnier / Tabor	2:05.32
2001	Medicean	4	Kieren Fallon	Sir Michael Stoute	Cheveley Park Stud	2:04.65
2002	Hawk Wing	3	Michael Kinane	Aidan O'Brien	Sue Magnier	2:13.34
2003	Falbrav	5	Darryll Holland	Luca Cumani	Rencati / Yoshida	2:05.59
2004	Refuse to Bend	4	Frankie Dettori	Saeed bin Suroor	Godolphin	2:08.31
2005	Oratorio	3	Kieren Fallon	Aidan O'Brien	Magnier / Tabor	2:07.00
2006	David Junior	4	Jamie Spencer	Brian Meehan	Roldvale Ltd	2:07.31
2007	Notnowcato	5	Ryan Moore	Sir Michael Stoute	A. & D. de Rothschild	2:05.85
2008	Mount Nelson	4	Johnny Murtagh	Aidan O'Brien	Smith / Magnier / Tabor	2:05.56
2009	Sea the Stars	3	Michael Kinane	John Oxx	Christopher Tsui	2:03.40
2010	Twice Over	5	Tom Queally	Henry Cecil	Khalid Abdullah	2:04.64
2011	So You Think	5	Seamie Heffernan	Aidan O'Brien	Derrick Smith et al.	2:04.77
2012	Nathaniel	4	William Buick	John Gosden	Lady Rothschild	2:06.94
2013	Al Kazeem	5	James Doyle	Roger Charlton	John Deer	2:04.35
2014	Mukhadram	5	Paul Hanagan	William Haggas	Hamdan Al Maktoum	2:04.47
2015	Golden Horn	3	Frankie Dettori	John Gosden	Anthony Oppenheimer	2:05.77
2016	Hawkbill	3	William Buick	Charlie Appleby	Godolphin	2:10.71
2017	Ulysses	4	Jim Crowley	Sir Michael Stoute	Flaxman Stables	2:03.49
2018	Roaring Lion	3	Oisin Murphy	John Gosden	Qatar Racing	2:04.04
2019	Enable	5	Frankie Dettori	John Gosden	Khalid Abdullah	2:04.77
2020 (Note: Three-year-olds were excluded from the 2020 running as part of race alterations due to the COVID-19 pandemic in the United Kingdom)	Ghaiyyath	5	William Buick	Charlie Appleby	Godolphin	2:04.48
2021	St Mark's Basilica	3	Ryan Moore	Aidan O'Brien	Smith / Magnier / Tabor	2:10.87
2022	Vadeni	3	Christophe Soumillon	Jean-Claude Rouget	Aga Khan IV	2:05.20
2023	Paddington	3	Ryan Moore	Aidan O'Brien	Tabor / Smith / Magnier et al.	2:05.16
2024	City of Troy	3	Ryan Moore	Aidan O'Brien	Magnier /Tabor / Smith /	2:09.80
2025	Delacroix	3	Ryan Moore	Aidan O'Brien	Smith / Magnier / Tabor	2:05.92
2026	Constitution River	3	Ryan Moore	Aidan O'Brien	Tabor / Smith / Magnier / Westerberg	2:04.43

== See also ==
- Horse racing in Great Britain
- List of British flat horse races
