= Rakwool =

Australian racehorse

- Sire: Woorak
- Grandsire: Traquair
- Dam: Wollumqua
- Damsire: Petrillo
- Sex: Gelding
- Foaled: 1925
- Country: Australia
- Colour: Bay
- Breeder: A. E. Tyson & E. Y. Shiel
- Owner: E. Y. Shiel

Major wins
- VRC Grand National (1931)

Rakwool was an Australian racehorse who carried 73 kg (11 st 7 lb) to win the Grand National Steeplechase at Flemington by 20 lengths in 1931. It's racing career was ended by injury at the age of six.

== Background ==
Rakwool was a bay gelding sired by Woorak, an Australian stallion whose most successful offspring was the Caulfield Cup winner, Whittier. His dam, Wollumqua, had produced four previous winners and went on to foal Precocious, which won the VRC Grand National in 1932. Wollumqua was sold for 625 guineas by her owner A. E. Tyson, to E. Y. Shiel while pregnant with the foal who would go on to be named Rakwool. The horse's earliest training was handled by Shiel's daughter, Dorothy.

== Racing career ==
=== Hurdle race ===
His first hurdle win was at Moonee Valley, when he surged to the lead from the outset and won. During the race, he accidentally caused the death of jockey Hughie Cairns.

=== Steeplechases ===
In June 1931, Rakwool won the Prince of Wales Steeplechase at Melbourne under a weight of 11 to 12 lbs and carried 12 7 lbs to victory in the Wanda Steeplechase. In July, he recorded his most significant win in the Victorian Grand National. Carrying 11 st 7 lbs he reportedly outjumped and outstayed the opposition to win. A week later, Rakwool carried 13st 2 lbs in the Godfrey Watson Steeplechase at Caulfield Racecourse in July, in which he sustained a career-ending injury. He began his leap much too far from the last fence and landed on the near side of it with his chest, throwing his rider clear. It was feared he had broken his back, with the accident causing him to be partly paralysed for many weeks, before recovering and officially retiring.

== See also ==
- List of racehorses
