= Donovan (horse) =

British-bred Thoroughbred racehorse

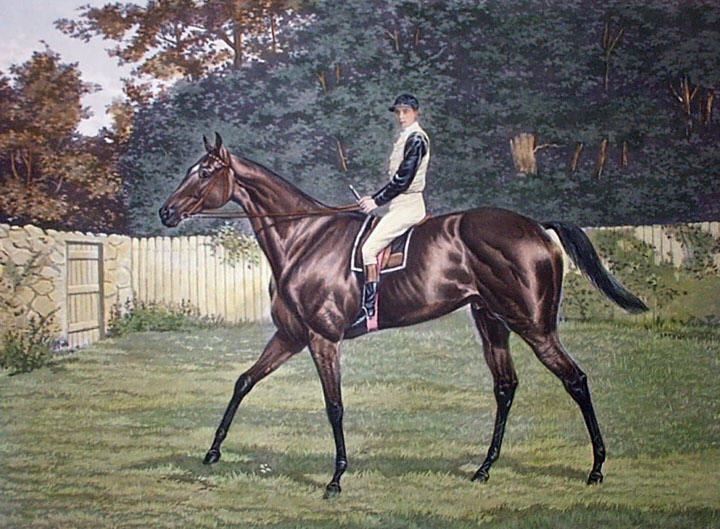
- Donovan, by Harrington Bird
- Sire: Galopin
- Grandsire: Vedette
- Dam: Mowerina
- Damsire: Scottish Chief
- Sex: Stallion
- Foaled: 1886
- Country: United Kingdom of Great Britain and Ireland
- Colour: Bay
- Breeder: William Cavendish-Bentinck, 6th Duke of Portland
- Owner: William Cavendish-Bentinck, 6th Duke of Portland
- Trainer: George Dawson
- Record: 21: 18-2-1
- Earnings: £55,443

Major wins
- New Stakes (1888); July Stakes (1888); Middle Park Plate (1888); Dewhurst Stakes (1888); Newmarket Stakes (1889); Epsom Derby (1889); Prince of Wales's Stakes (1889); St Leger (1889); Lancashire Plate (1889)

Donovan (1886–1905) was a British Thoroughbred racehorse and sire. In a career that lasted from 1888 to 1889, he ran twenty-one times and won eighteen races. He was the leading British two-year-old of 1888 when he won eleven of his thirteen starts. At the age of three Donovan won The Derby and the St Leger: he failed to win the English Triple Crown owing to a narrow and probably unlucky defeat in the 2000 Guineas. He set a world record by earning a total of £55,443 in win prize money. Donovan was a modest success as a stallion. He died after being injured in an accident in 1905.

== Background ==
Donovan was a dark-coated bay bred by his owner William Cavendish-Bentinck, 6th Duke of Portland, a Conservative politician and landowner. Among the Duke's other horses were the undefeated St. Simon and the 1888 Derby winner Ayrshire. He was sent into training with George Dawson at his Heath House Stable in Newmarket, Suffolk.

Donovan's sire Galopin was an outstanding racehorse who won the Derby in 1872 and went on to be a successful and influential stallion, being Champion sire on three occasions. Mowerina, Donovan's dam, won sixteen races and produced several winners including the 1000 Guineas winner Semolina and the colt Raeburn, the only horse ever to defeat Isinglass.

== Racing career ==
=== 1888: two-year-old season ===
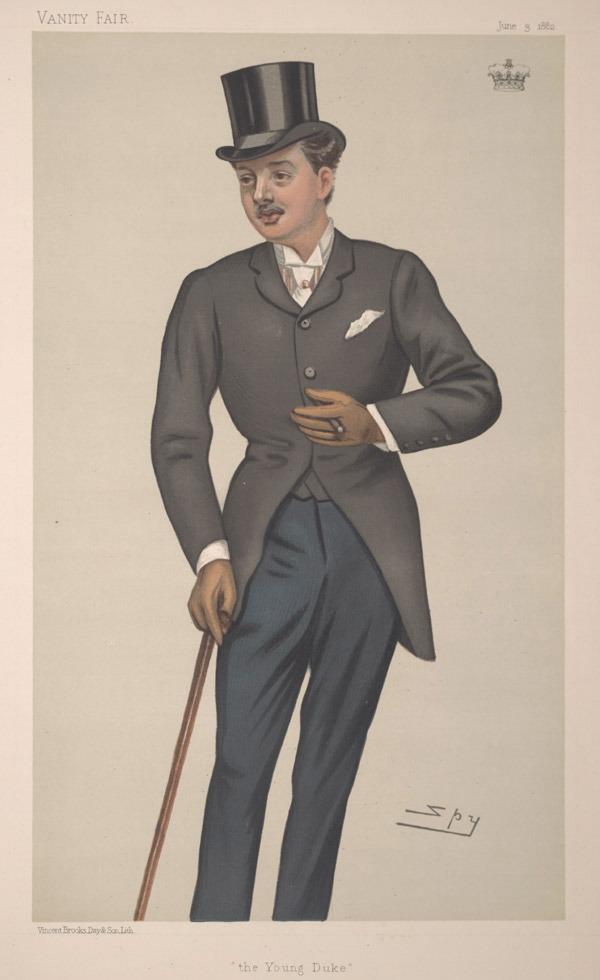
6th Duke of Portland, Donovan's owner and breeder

Donovan appeared in the first week of the flat season to win the Brocklesby Stakes at Lincoln Racecourse "a bit cleverly" by two lengths from the filly Poem. He then took the Portland Stakes at Leicester, winning by three lengths from a field of twenty-four opponents for a prize of £6,000, making the race more valuable than the Derby. In the £5,000 Whitsuntide Plate at Manchester Racecourse, Donovan was set to carry 136 pounds and suffered his first defeat when four lengths second to the well-fancied Chitabob.

In the summer of 1888 Donovan was sent to Royal Ascot where he won the New Stakes from weak opposition. He then won the Home-bred Foal Stakes at Stockbridge and the Hurstbourne Stakes at the same venue on 28 June, winning easily by two lengths. On 3 July at Newmarket he won the July Stakes by half a length from Gold, the only other runner. At Goodwood later in the month he took the Ham Stakes, but then finished third to El Dorado and Gold in the "Prince of Wales's Stakes" on "fearfully heavy going."

At Newmarket in autumn, Donovan proved himself the year's best two-year-old with four more wins. He won the Buckenham Stakes and the Hopeful Stakes, before running in the season's most prestigious two-year-old race, the Middle Park Plate on 10 October. Carrying top weight of 129 pounds he started 11/8 favourite in a field of fourteen and won in a race record time of 1:15.2, beating Gulliver by two lengths. The unplaced horses included the colt Enthusiast and the filly Minthe, who went on to win the 2000 Guineas and the 1000 Guineas respectively. Up to this point, all his races had been over five or six furlongs but on his final start of the year he moved up to seven furlongs for the first time and added the Dewhurst Stakes, giving ten pounds to Enthusiast and winning "in a canter".

He ended the season as the "acknowledged Champion" having won eleven of his thirteen starts against the best available opposition and earning a record £16,487. He was compared in the press to previous outstanding two-year-olds such as Thormanby and The Bard. It was also pointed out that in easily winning the Dewhurst Stakes, he had emulated the achievement of Ormonde and Kisber, both of whom went on to win the Derby. Donovan went into the winter as 3/1 favourite for the Epsom race, despite concerns about a perceived lack of stamina in his pedigree.

=== 1889: three-year-old season ===
==== Spring ====
On his three-year-old debut, Donovan won a "monster" prize of £12,000 in the "Prince of Wales's Stakes" at Leicester on April 6. He started at odds of 8/13 and took the lead two furlongs out to win "in the commonest of canters" by two lengths from Pioneer with Minthe four lengths further back in third. The Duke of Portland donated £1,000 of his winnings to the local hospital. The Prince of Wales himself was in attendance, despite a reported assassination threat.

In the 2000 Guineas on 1 May Donovan started 20/85 favourite in a field of nine. Ridden by Fred Barrett, he raced prominently and took the lead soon after half way and turned back a challenge from Pioneer, but was overtaken by Enthusiast who raced down the centre of the course. Donovan ran on again and almost caught Enthusiast but failed by a head after a "magnificent race'" with Pioneer third. It was suggested that Barrett had regarded Pioneer as his only danger and had ignored the challenge of Enthusiast until it was too late for an effective response. Despite his defeat he remained a strong favourite for the Derby, being offered at odds of 2/1.

In the Newmarket Stakes over ten furlongs on 22 May Donovan "very easily" defeated his stable companion The Turcophone, with Laureate third and Enthusiast fourth, leading to his price for the Derby shortening to 4/5.

==== Summer ====
At Epsom on 5 June, Donovan (who arrived at the course with a security entourage of detectives and police constables) started 8/11 against twelve opponents, including The Turcophone who was running as a pacemaker. The race took place in "glorious weather" in front of a very large crowd which included the Prince and Princess of Wales. As in his previous races in 1889, Donovan was taken directly to the start to be saddled instead of appearing in the paddock and parading with the other runners: the Duke explained that this was because of the colt's nervous or "fidgetty" temperament. After a short delay caused by false starts, the race got under way with The Turcophone setting a strong pace, while Tommy Loates settled Donovan in fourth place. Loates sent the favourite into the lead early in the straight as the pacemaker dropped away, and it became clear that Miguel was his only real challenger. Donovan, however, was never in danger of defeat and won easily by one and a half lengths from Miguel, with El Dorado six lengths back in third. The "lucky" Duke's memorable summer continued when he was married to Winifred Dallas-Yorke six days later.

Donovan was then sent to Royal Ascot for the Prince of Wales's Stakes over thirteen furlongs in which he started at odds of 2/9 despite carrying top weight of 131 pounds. He took the lead in the straight and won easily by one and a half lengths from Royal Star with Enthusiast third.

==== Autumn ====
Donovan returned on 11 September for the St Leger at Doncaster. He started 8/13 in a field of thirteen with his main rival expected to be the Yorkshire-trained Chitabob the colt who had defeated Donovan in June 1888, and who had recently returned after training problems. Ridden by Barrett, Donovan was always prominent and moved into the lead early in the straight. Chitabob emerged as a challenger, but quickly dropped back, leaving Donovan to win by three lengths with Miguel, as at Epsom, finishing second.

Having proved himself over an extended fourteen furlongs at Doncaster, Donovan was brought back to seven furlongs ten days later for the £12,000 Lancashire Plate at Manchester Racecourse. On this occasion, his main danger was expected to come from the outstanding two-year-old Alicante who had won the Prix de la Salamandre and the Prix de la Forêt, although the field also included the Classic-winning fillies Minthe and Seabreeze as well as Chitabob and Enthusiast. Chitabob attempted to make all the running, but Barrett was always prominent on Donovan before taking the lead inside the final furlong and winning by two lengths. The win took the lifetime earnings of "Duke Donovan" as he was being called, to £54,694, and those of his owner to almost £100,000 for the season. On his final start of the year he returned to Newmarket in October and won the Royal Stakes from Minthe, the only horse to oppose him.

Donovan was kept in training at four with the Ascot Gold Cup as his target, but he broke down and was retired in June without running another race.

== Assessment and earnings ==
Donovan was considered by some to be a fortunate horse who had emerged in a generation with few other top class performers, but by the end of the three-year-old season he was acknowledged by others as "a really great racehorse."

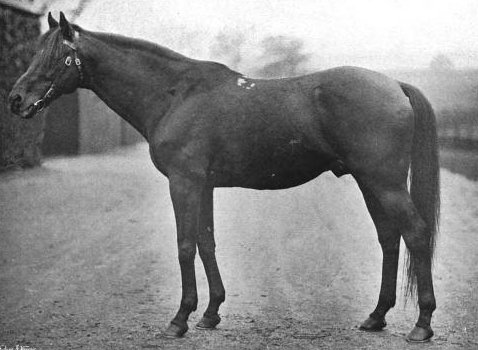
Donovan in 1903.

Having earned £16,487 as a two-year-old, Donovan added a further £38,666 in 1889, to give a career total of £55,153, by far the largest up to that time.

== Stud career ==
Donovan retired to the Rufford Abbey stud where he stood at a fee of 200 guineas before moving to the Worksop Manor Stud. Although he sired some good horses he failed to live up to expectations and his fee eventually dropped to 25 guineas. His best offspring was the colt Velasquez who ran second to Galtee More in the Derby and won the Eclipse Stakes. Donovan was euthanized at Worksop Manor in February 1905 after sustaining serious injuries when he collided with a tree in his paddock. He was buried at the Duke of Portland's Welbeck Abbey Stud.

== Sire line tree ==
- Donovan
  - Matchmaker
    - Handicapper
  - Velasquez
  - O'Donovan Rossa
  - Veronese

== Pedigree ==
Pedigree of Donovan (GB), bay, 1886
Sire Galopin (GB) 1872	Vedette; 1854	Voltigeur	Voltaire*
Sire Galopin (GB) 1872	Vedette; 1854	Voltigeur	Martha Lynn
Sire Galopin (GB) 1872	Vedette; 1854	Mrs Ridgway	Birdcatcher*^
Sire Galopin (GB) 1872	Vedette; 1854	Mrs Ridgway	Nan Darrell
Sire Galopin (GB) 1872	Flying Duchess; 1853	The Flying Dutchman	Bay Middleton*^
Sire Galopin (GB) 1872	Flying Duchess; 1853	The Flying Dutchman	Barbelle
Sire Galopin (GB) 1872	Flying Duchess; 1853	Merope	Voltaire*
Sire Galopin (GB) 1872	Flying Duchess; 1853	Merope	Juniper mare
Dam Mowerina (DEN) 1876	Scottish Chief; 1861	Lord of the Isles	Touchstone*^
Dam Mowerina (DEN) 1876	Scottish Chief; 1861	Lord of the Isles	Fair Helen
Dam Mowerina (DEN) 1876	Scottish Chief; 1861	Miss Ann	The Little Known
Dam Mowerina (DEN) 1876	Scottish Chief; 1861	Miss Ann	Bay Missy^
Dam Mowerina (DEN) 1876	Stockings; 1863	Stockwell	The Baron^
Dam Mowerina (DEN) 1876	Stockings; 1863	Stockwell	Pocahontas
Dam Mowerina (DEN) 1876	Stockings; 1863	Go-Ahead	Melbourne
Dam Mowerina (DEN) 1876	Stockings; 1863	Go-Ahead	Mowerina (1843)(Family: 7)^

* Donovan is inbred 4S x 4S to the stallion Voltaire, meaning that he appears fourth generation twice on the sire side of his pedigree.

*^ Donovan is inbred 4S x 5D to the stallion Birdcatcher, meaning that he appears fourth generation on the sire side of his pedigree and fifth generation (via The Baron)^ on the dam side of his pedigree.

*^ Donovan is inbred 4S x 5D to the stallion Bay Middleton, meaning that he appears fourth generation on the sire side of his pedigree and fifth generation (via Bay Missy)^ on the dam side of his pedigree.

*^ Donovan is inbred 4D x 5D to the stallion Touchstone, meaning that he appears fourth generation and fifth generation (via Mowerina)^ on the dam side of his pedigree.
