= George Dawson (trainer) =

Personal information
- Born: 1853
- Died: 14 June 1913 (aged 59–60) Newmarket, Suffolk
- Occupation: Trainer

Horse racing career
- Sport: Horse racing

Major racing wins
- British Classic Race wins as trainer: 2000 Guineas (1); 1000 Guineas (2); Epsom Derby (2); Epsom Oaks (3); St Leger (2)

Racing awards
- Leading British Trainer 1888

Significant horses
- Ayrshire, Donovan, Semolina, Memoir, Amiable

George Peddie Thomas Dawson (1853 – 14 June 1913), was a British trainer of racehorses. A member of a highly successful racing family, he trained the winners of ten British Classic Races in seven seasons between 1888 and 1894.

== Background ==
George Dawson was the son of the Scottish trainer John Dawson who won The Derby with Petrarch in 1876. He was also the nephew of the trainers Thomas Dawson and Mathew Dawson. Despite his background, Dawson did not initially pursue a career in horse racing but went into business and by 1883 was running a successful brewery at Burton-on-Trent. In 1884 he moved to Newmarket, Suffolk where he worked for several months as assistant trainer to his uncle Mathew at the latter's Heath House stable. When Mathew Dawson "retired" in 1885, George was invited to take over the stable despite his limited experience.

== Training career ==
George Dawson operated Heath House as a private stable for a consortium of aristocratic owners led by the Duke of Portland. Dawson was given some credit for introducing modern training methods, preferring shorter, faster gallops to the long, slow pieces of work previously favoured.

In 1888, Dawson trained Ayrshire, owned by Portland, to win both the 2000 Guineas and The Derby, whilst the Duke's colt Donovan was the season's leading two-year-old. Although there was no official championship in 1888, Dawson was the leading British trainer in terms of prize money, and the £77,914 won by horses trained at Heath House set a record which stood for forty-three years. In the following season Donovan gave Dawson a second Derby and also won the St Leger.

The rest of Dawson's classic wins came with four fillies, all owned by the Duke of Portland. In 1890 Semolina won the 1000 Guineas and Memoir took both the Oaks and the St Leger. Mrs Butterwick won the Oaks in 1893 and Amiable took both fillies' classics a year later.

Dawson's run of success ended when the lease on Heath House expired in 1898, and Portland moved his horses to the stable of John Porter at Kingsclere. Dawson took over his father's Warren House stable in 1900 but was never able to reproduce his earlier success. He died at Warren House on 14 June 1913.
