= Manchester Racecourse =

Defunct horse racing venue in England

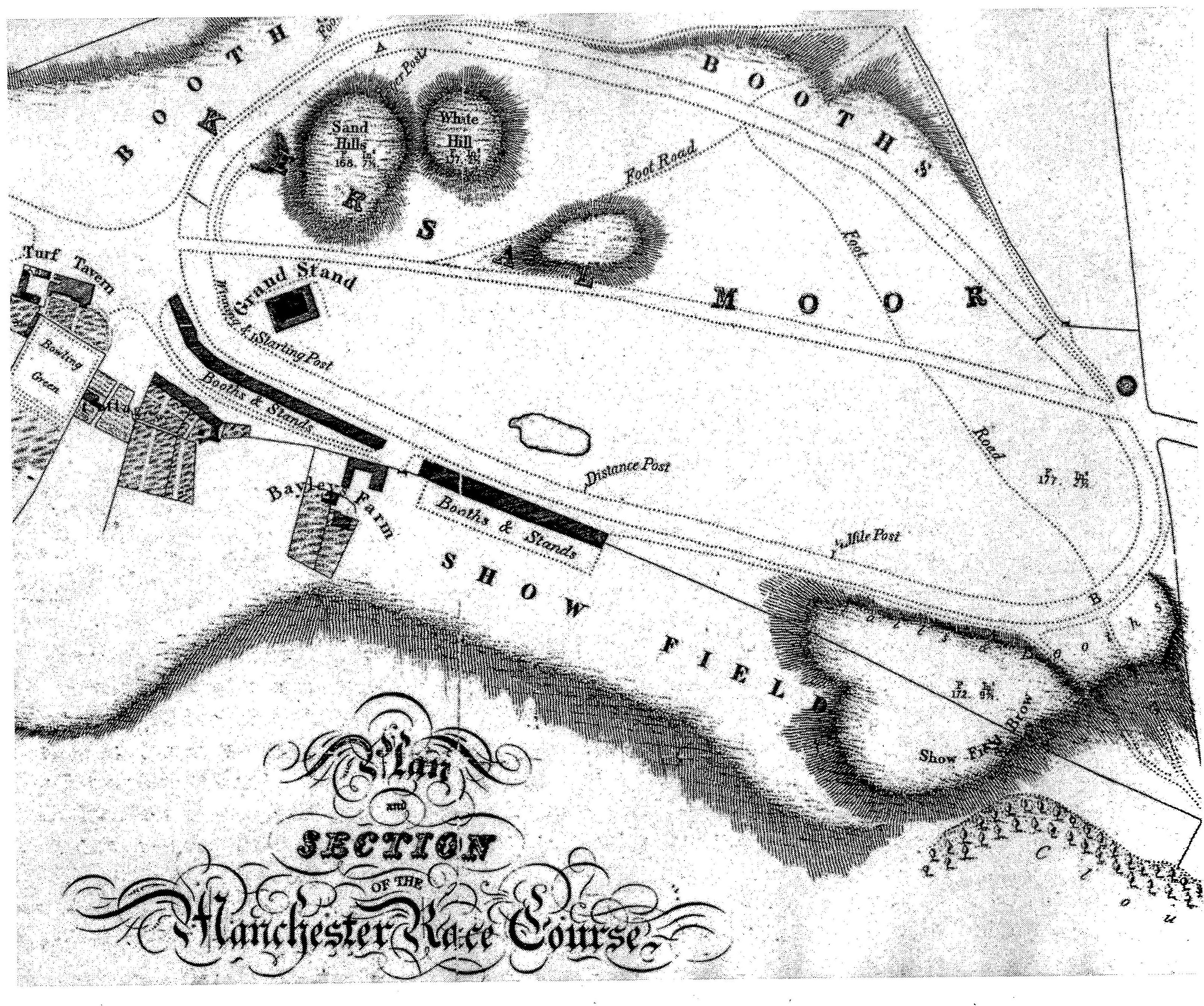
- Kersal Moor Racecourse
- Location: Kersal Moor, Castle Irwell and New Barnes
- Coordinates: 53.4994°N 2.2752°W
- Owned by: Defunct
- Date opened: Various
- Date closed: November 1963
- Course type: Flat; National Hunt
- Notable races: November Handicap; Lancashire Oaks; Lancashire Plate

Manchester Racecourse was a venue for horse racing located at a number of sites around the Manchester area including; Kersal Moor, New Barns, Weaste and Castle Irwell, Pendleton, then in Lancashire. The final home of the course, Castle Irwell, was closed in 1963. Despite its name, the course was never actually located within the boundaries of the ancient township of Manchester or the subsequent city of Manchester.

== Location and history ==
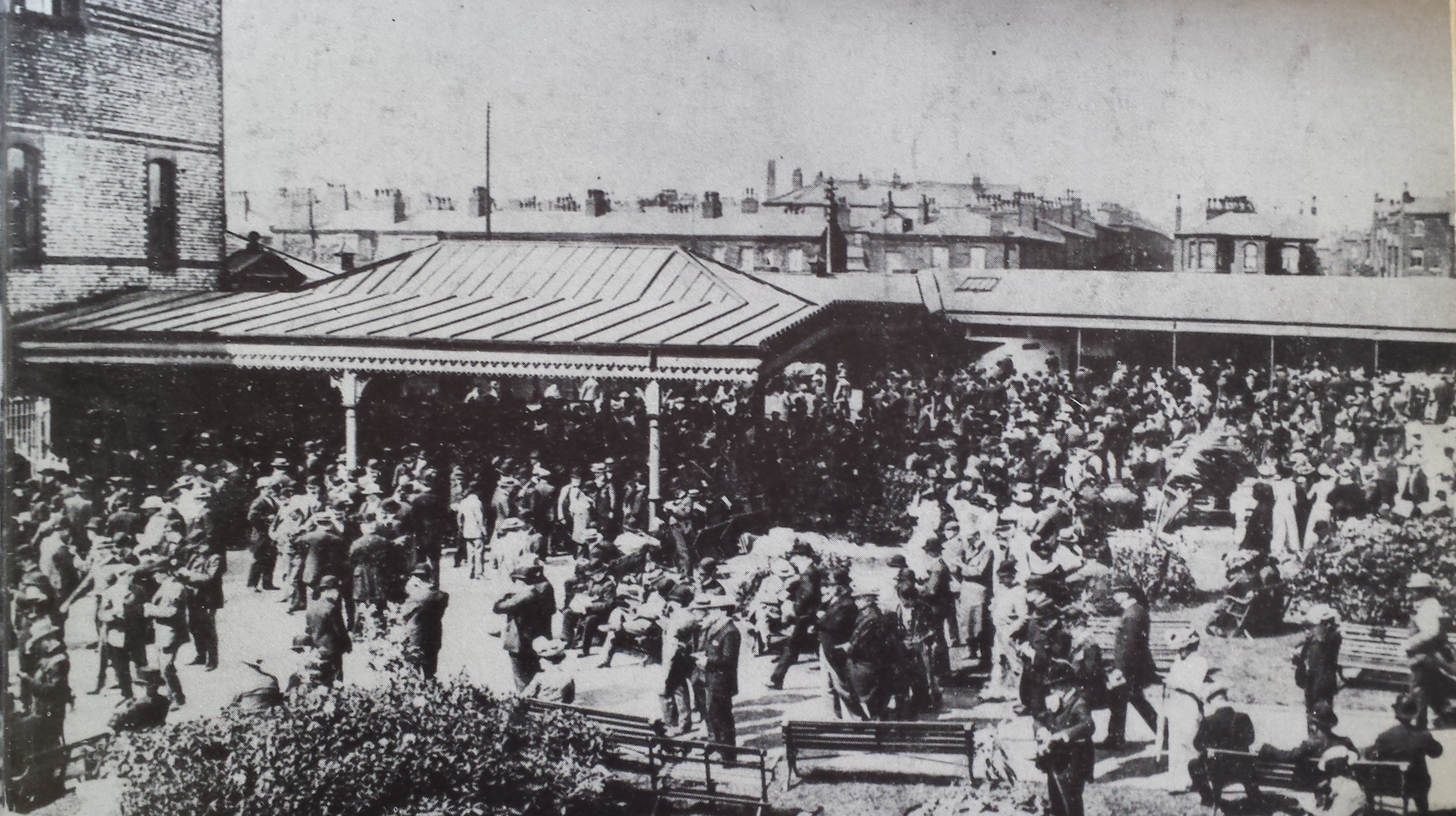
New Barns Racecourse 31 May 1901

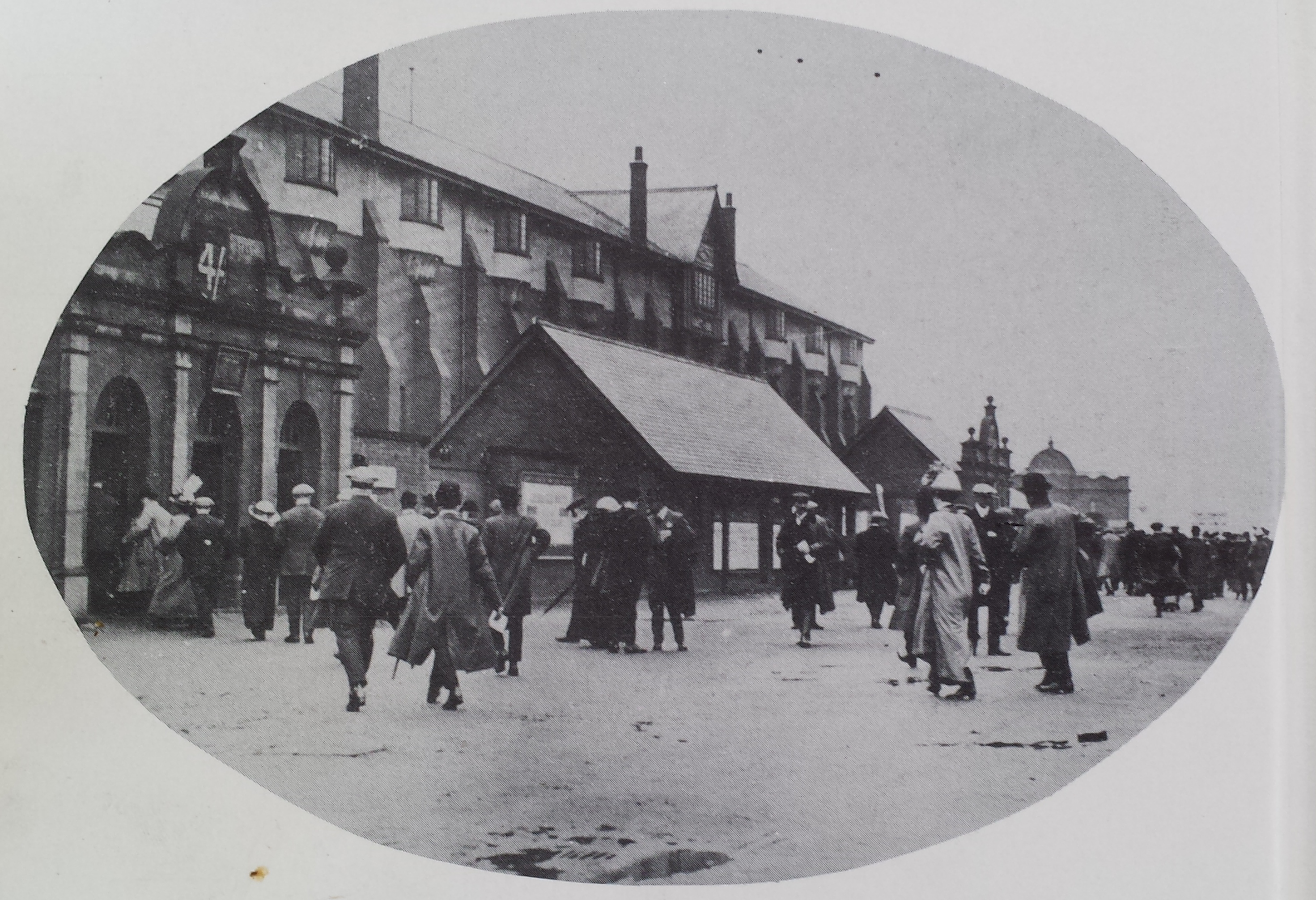
Entrance to Castle Irwell Racecourse 1908

The earliest known horse races in the Manchester area were run at Barlow Moor, first recorded in 1647, and again from 1697 to 1701 and the earliest record of horse-racing on Kersal Moor is from a notice in the London Gazette of 2–5 May 1687. There were a number of other short-lived courses or one-off steeplechases at, for example, Heaton Park (1827–38), Eccles (1839), Harpurhey (1845) and Stretford (on the site of the Old Trafford Cricket Ground, 1841 and 1852–4) but from 1687 to 1847, Kersal Moor was the main racing venue for Manchester.

=== Kersal Moor ===
On 2–5 May 1687 the following notice appeared in the London Gazette:

On Carsall Moore near Manchester in Lancashire on the 18th instant, a 20£. plate will be run for to carry ten stone, and ride three heats, four miles each heat. And the next day another plate of 40£. will be run for at the same moore, riding the same heats and carrying the same weight. The horses marks are to be given in four days before to Mr. William Swarbrick at the Kings Arms in Manchester.

The course at Kersal Moor was undulating and about a mile in circumference round three low hills. John Byrom (1692–1763), the owner of Kersal Cell, was greatly opposed to the racing and wrote a pamphlet against it, but racing continued for another fifteen years until, probably through Dr Byrom's influence, it was stopped in 1746, the year of the Jacobite rising. After this there is known to have been at least one race in 1750; regular fixtures recommenced in 1759 and were then held every year. A grandstand was built by subscription in 1777, followed by a ladies' stand equipped for refreshments, in 1780. In 1840, the course was described as having a grandstand and a number of other buildings and a "fine run in". By this time, two meetings were held annually — the long-standing Whit races, which attracted over 100,000 spectators, and another meeting in August. The Kersal Moor course closed permanently in 1847 when the Manchester Racecourse Committee's lease ran out and was not renewed.

=== Castle Irwell ===
After the closure of the Kersal Moor course, racing was moved across the River Irwell to a site known as Castle Irwell, named after the large, castellated house on the site. The land was rented for £500 per annum on a twenty-year lease from John Fitzgerald, who was a Member of Parliament and the owner of Pendleton Colliery. The course, built on flat land in a meander of the river, was damp and boggy, prone to mist and the going was heavy. However, a large grandstand was erected, to seat over 1,000 spectators, and the course, being bounded by the river on three sides, was easier to manage than Kersal Moor. The whole course could be seen from the grandstand and from Castle Hill, across the river but the approaches to the course were guarded by toll-men. Richard Wright proctor wrote in 1862

The river is also the source of occasional merriment. As the approaches to the race-ground are jealously guarded by toll-men, it follows that many urchins, penniless tramps, and artizans out of employ are annually excluded. Of these unfortunates some turn listlessly homeward, while others, more persevering, gather in groups along the bank of the stream, and select a place for fording. The youngsters then strip, and fasten their bundled apparel upon their heads; the men turn up their trousers, slinging their shoes and stockings over their shoulders; thus prepared they enter the water, some crossing with comparative ease; but others, on dropping a cap, or swimming a stocking, or sinking deeper than they expected, lose heart and return, to the infinite amusement of those on the winning side. If, as Poor Richard affirms, a penny saved be a penny gained, this is the way to gain it with a vengeance.

When Fitzgerald died, the property passed to his son (also called John), who refused to renew the lease when it expired in 1867 "for just and Christian reasons" and the course was closed.

=== New Barns ===
The race meetings were then transferred to a new course at New Barns, Weaste. New Barns hosted the Lancashire Plate, over seven furlongs, which was run from 1888 to 1893 and was one of the most valuable races in the country with a prize of £11,000. It was renamed the Prince Edward Handicap in 1894, worth £2,000. New Barns (and Castle Irwell) traditionally staged the final fixture of the British flat racing season, with the highlight being the Manchester November Handicap.

Racing continued at New Barns for over 30 years but in 1889, the owners of the course were served notice that the Manchester Ship Canal Company were to seek powers to compulsorily purchase the land for the construction of a new dock and warehouses. After a protracted court case The Ship Canal Company took possession of the land in 1902. and the New Barns course closed. Dock Number 9, its warehouses & railway sidings from New Barns Junction with adjacent timber yard were built on the site of the old Steeple Chase Courses & spectator stands.

Sports historian Dr Sam Oldfield said "New Barns would have been a central hub to the community." She added that there were multiple examples of New Barns hosting athletic competitions. Rugby, cycling and other sports also took place at the course, which was also home to markets, public events and political rallies.

=== Back to Castle Irwell ===
By 1898, John Fitzgerald had died, and the Race Committee bought the Castle Irwell site from his executors. They then formed a Company and set about building a sports facility fit for the 20th Century. A high wall was built on the sides not bounded by the river; gardens and glazed galleries were built inside and there were trams to the main entrance. There was a luxurious club stand built in an eccentric amalgam of styles and the main entrance was adorned with dutch gables. The course was finally inaugurated on the Easter weekend of 1902. This first meeting was over jumps, with the principal event being the Lancashire Steeplechase, a handicap of £1,750. This race was run until 1952. The first flat meeting was held in 1902 at Whitsuntide, featuring the Castle Irwell Inauguration Handicap, worth £500 to the winner. It was won by Vatel, ridden by Kempton Cannon.

John Rickman describes the course thus: "It is a curious shape because it was made in a loop of the Irwell. At the base of this loop there is only a narrow neck of land about 300 yards across. Both 'arms' of the racecourse, let us call them the back stretch and the home stretch have to pass through this 'Dardanelles'. Thus, although the home stretch was made straight, giving a 5 furlongs run in as well as a straight 6 furlongs, the back stretch has of necessity a remarkable kink opposite the stands." The flat course was 1 mile 6 furlongs round.

The course was close to the Manchester city centre and was well served by trams. It was right-handed, and there were three separate tracks on the site, flat, hurdle and steeplechase. Castle Irwell was the venue for the Lancashire Oaks from its inception in 1939 until 1963 and the course also staged a Classic race – the wartime substitute St. Leger Stakes in 1941. The winner was Lord Portal's Sun Castle, 10–1, who beat Chateau Larose (R. Jones) by a short head. Sun Castle was ridden by Georges Bridgland, who rode Pearl Diver to win the Derby in 1947.

The Racecourse Hotel was built next to the course on Littleton Road in the 1930s, to serve the spectators and provide overnight accommodation for the jockeys. The November Handicap attracted crowds that spread right into the city centre and England's first ever evening meeting was held on Friday 13 July 1951. There was a large crowd in spite of cold, damp weather. The meeting continued the following day at 2pm.

In June 1952, at Castle Irwell, Queen Elizabeth II celebrated her first winner as an owner after acceding to the throne.

By the 1960s, the problems with the site were beginning to show and the club stand was found to be riddled with rot. A new stand was built, one of the first fully cantilevered reinforced concrete stands to be built in Britain and the first with private viewing boxes. However, the cost put a great strain on the course's finances and within two years financial difficulties persuaded the shareholders to sell the site. The final race, The Goodbye Consolation Plate, was held on 9 November 1963 and won by Lester Piggott, watched by over 20,000 spectators. The November Handicap was transferred to Doncaster and the Lancashire Oaks to Haydock Park.

== Reuse of Castle Irwell site ==
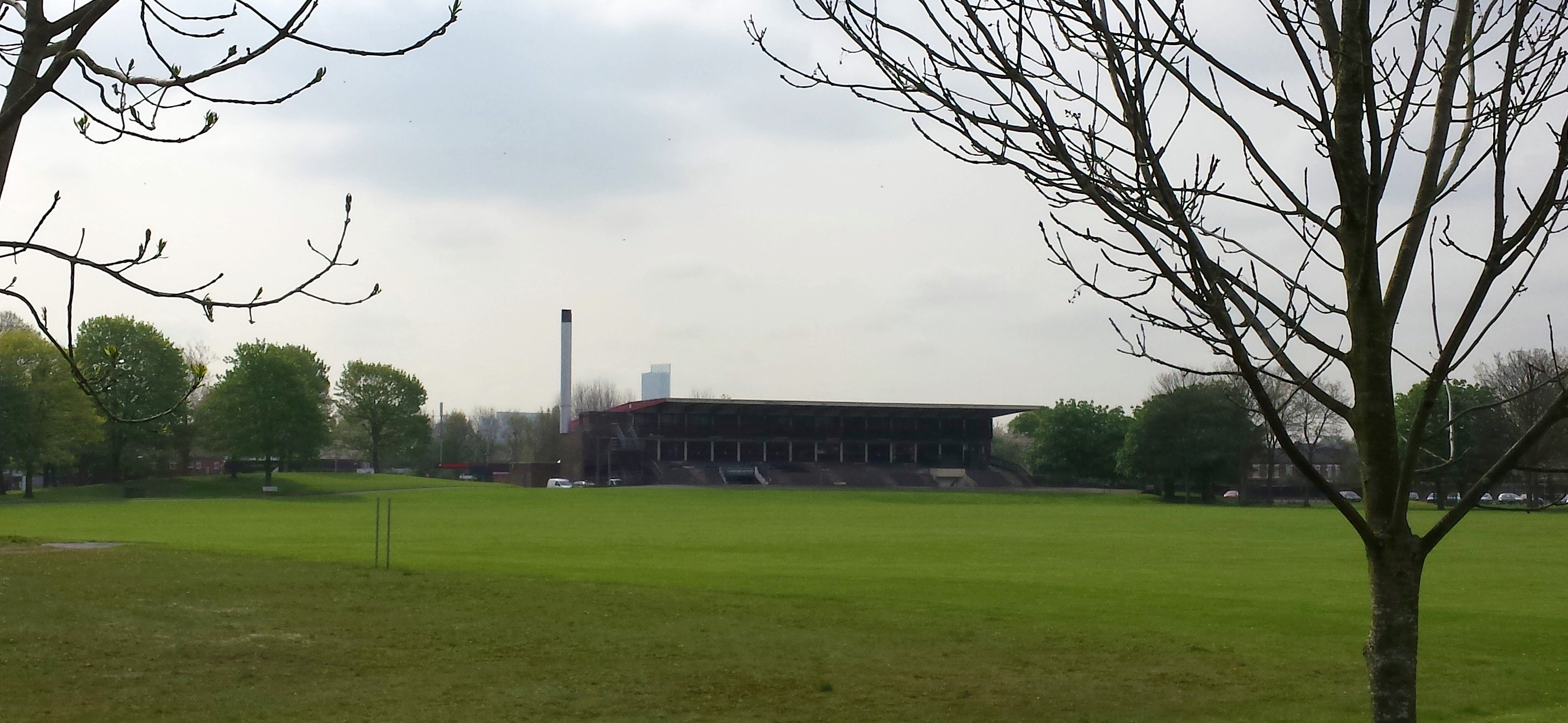
The Pavilion in 2014

The Castle Irwell racecourse closed after the meeting on 9 November 1963 and the majority of the site was put up for sale. The University of Salford was interested in purchasing the site and opposed its sale to a property development company; this was supported by the City of Salford who wished to use part of the site for playing fields.

In 1973, the University of Salford bought most of the site and its buildings for £46,000. It was used to construct a student village. The Members' Stand was retained to become an entertainment venue known as the Pavilion or the Pav. It was run by the University of Salford Students' Union, before it closed in June 2010. The Student Village closed in June 2015 at the end of the academic year. An arson attack in July 2016 seriously damaged the former racecourse stand.

A concrete bridge was built across the River Irwell allowing access to the northern end of the site which was developed by Salford Council as public playing fields.

In March 2015, work began on an £11.75 million scheme to create a flood basin and nature reserve combined with playing fields on the north of the site to extend the River Irwell flood defence scheme already in place on Littleton Road. The scheme, which involved the creation of a flood basin and wetland covering most of the site, was completed in March 2018.

A company owned by bookmaker Fred Done, who began his career at Manchester Racecourse, purchased the former student village and plans to build 500 homes on the site. As part of the development the old racecourse turnstile building has been restored with its use to be determined.

== Bibliography ==
- Inglis, Simon (2004). Played in Manchester. English Heritage. ISBN 1873592787.
- Proctor, Richard Wright (1862). Our turf, our stage, and our ring. Simpkin, Marshall and Co.
