= William Cavendish-Bentinck, 6th Duke of Portland =

British landowner and politician

His Grace The Duke of Portland KG GCVO GCStJ TD PC DL
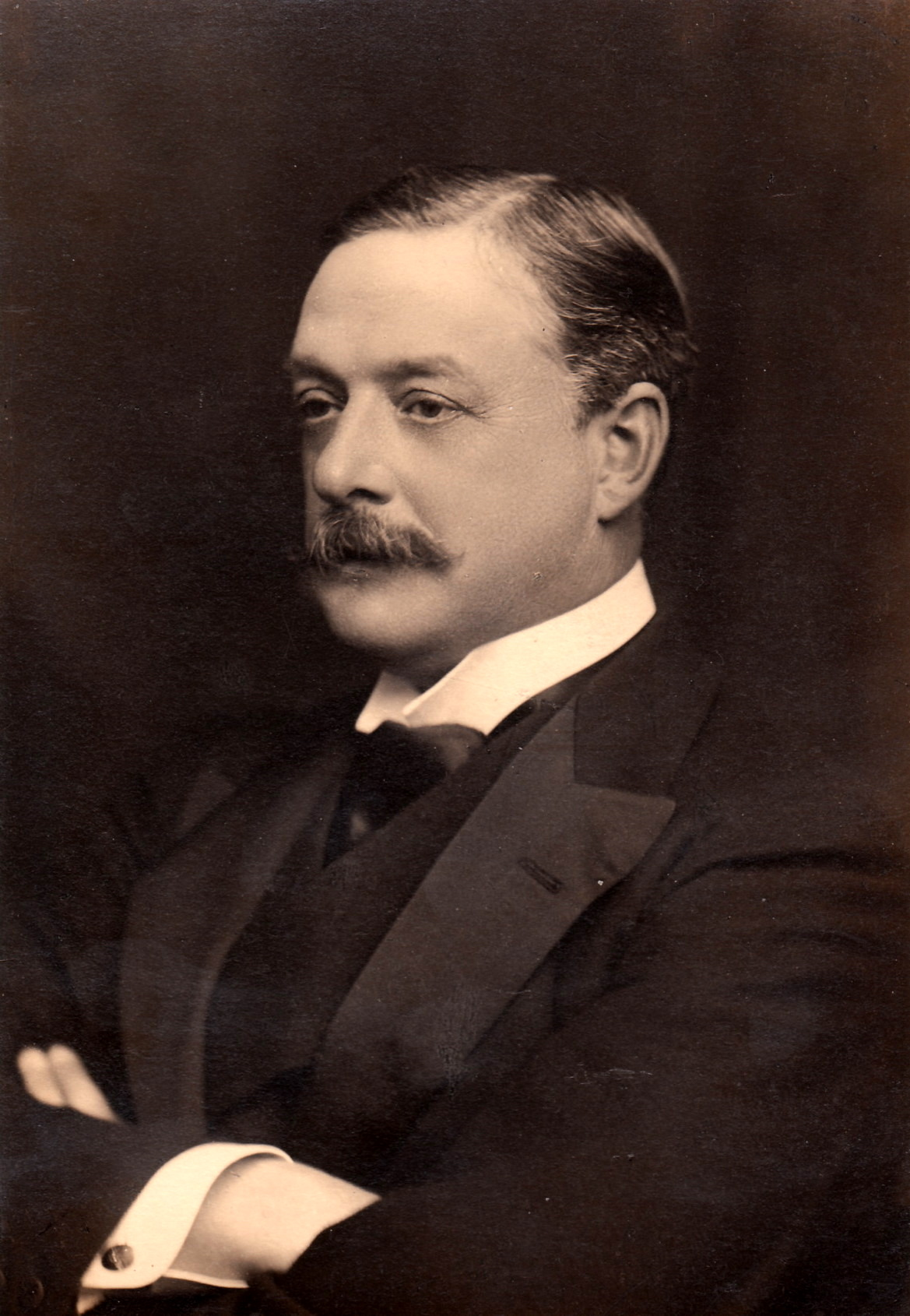
- The Duke of Portland, circa 1900.

Master of the Horse
- In office 9 August 1886 – 11 August 1892
- Monarch: Queen Victoria
- Prime Minister: The Marquess of Salisbury
- Preceded by: The Earl of Cork
- Succeeded by: The Viscount Oxenbridge
- In office 16 July 1895 – 4 December 1905
- Monarchs: Queen Victoria; Edward VII
- Prime Minister: The Marquess of Salisbury; Arthur Balfour
- Preceded by: The Earl of Cork
- Succeeded by: The Earl of Sefton

Personal details
- Born: 28 December 1857 Dunkeld, Perthshire, Scotland
- Died: 26 April 1943 (aged 85) Welbeck Abbey, Nottinghamshire, England
- Party: Conservative
- Spouse: Winifred Dallas-Yorke (m. 1889)
- Children: Lady Victoria Erskine-Wemyss; William Cavendish-Bentinck, 7th Duke of Portland; Lord Francis Cavendish-Bentinck

William Arthur Charles Cavendish-Bentinck, 6th Duke of Portland, KG, GCVO, GCStJ, TD, PC, DL (28 December 1857 – 26 April 1943) was a British landowner, courtier, and Conservative politician. He notably served as Master of the Horse between 1886 and 1905.

== Early life ==
Portland was the son of Lt.-Gen. Arthur Cavendish-Bentinck (1819–1877) by his first wife Elizabeth Sophia Hawkins-Whitshed, granddaughter of Admiral Sir James Hawkins-Whitshed. His paternal grandfather was Lord Charles Bentinck, third son of Prime Minister William Cavendish-Bentinck, 3rd Duke of Portland by his wife Lady Dorothy Cavendish, daughter of William Cavendish, 4th Duke of Devonshire. Portland's mother died only a few days after his birth.

He was educated at Eton.

== Career ==
He inherited the Portland estates, based around Welbeck Abbey in Nottinghamshire, from his cousin William Cavendish-Scott-Bentinck, 5th Duke of Portland, in 1879. He also succeeded his stepmother as second Baron Bolsover in 1893. His half-sister, Lady Ottoline Morrell, was a society hostess and patron of the arts associated with the Bloomsbury Group.

He owned 183,000 acres with 101,000 acres in Caithness with 43,000 acres in Nottinghamshire and 35,000 acres in Northumberland.

=== Public life ===
Portland initially embarked on a military career and served as a lieutenant in the Coldstream Guards from 1877 to 1880, and then as lieutenant-colonel of the part-time Honourable Artillery Company from 1881 to 1889. He was honorary colonel of the 1st Lanarkshire Artillery Volunteers from 1884 to 1891, of the 4th (Royal Sherwood Foresters Militia) Battalion, Sherwood Foresters, from 1889 and its Special Reserve successor from 1908, and of the 7th (Robin Hood) Battalion, Sherwood Foresters (Volunteers, later Territorial Force) from 1898.

He sat on the Conservative benches in the House of Lords and held office as Master of the Horse under Lord Salisbury from 1886 to 1892 and from 1895 to 1902 and under Arthur Balfour from 1902 to 1905. In 1886, he was sworn of the Privy Council.

He was made a Knight Grand Cross of the Royal Victorian Order (GCVO) in 1896, and was a holder of the Royal Victorian Chain. In 1900 he was appointed a Knight Companion of the Garter, receiving the insignia in an investiture by Queen Victoria at Windsor Castle on 16 March 1900. He was appointed a Knight of Justice of the Order of the Hospital of St. John of Jerusalem in England (KStJ) in July 1901. He also held the Grand Cross of the Order of Charles III (Spain), 1st Class Order of St Sava (Serbia) the Grand Cordon of the Order of the Crown (Belgium), and the Grand Cross of the Order of St Stephen (Austria-Hungary).

The Portlands visited British India to attend the 1903 Delhi Durbar held in January 1903 to celebrated the succession of King Edward VII as Emperor of India.

He was Lord-Lieutenant of Caithness from 1889 to 1919, Lord Lieutenant of Nottinghamshire from 1898 to 1939, a Deputy Lieutenant of Ayrshire, and a trustee of the British Museum.

The Portlands received Archduke Franz Ferdinand of Austria at Welbeck Abbey for a week in 1913 when the heir to the Austro-Hungarian throne visited England. During the stay he took the Archduke shooting on the estate when, according to Portland's memoirs, Men, Women and Things:

"One of the loaders fell down. This caused both barrels of the gun he was carrying to be discharged, the shot passing within a few feet of the archduke and myself. I have often wondered whether the Great War might not have been averted, or at least postponed, had the archduke met his death there and not at Sarajevo the following year."

From 1937 to 1943 he was Chancellor of the Order of the Garter. At the coronation of King George VI Portland carried the crown of Queen Elizabeth, whose mother (the Countess of Strathmore and Kinghorne) was his cousin. It was at his estate in Langwell that the Sunderland Flying boat carrying Prince George, Duke of Kent (the King's youngest brother) crashed while en route to a RAF Base in Iceland.

=== Thoroughbred horse racing ===
Portland inherited the estate and stud farm near Clumber Park in North Nottinghamshire. Among the horses he owned was St. Simon, who won the 1884 Ascot Gold Cup. He also bred and owned Ayrshire and Donovan, who won the 1888 and 1889 runnings of the Derby.

in 1890 Portland built "The Winnings", a row of 6 almshouses at Welbeck Abbey, with the proceeds of his horse racing successes.

== Personal life ==
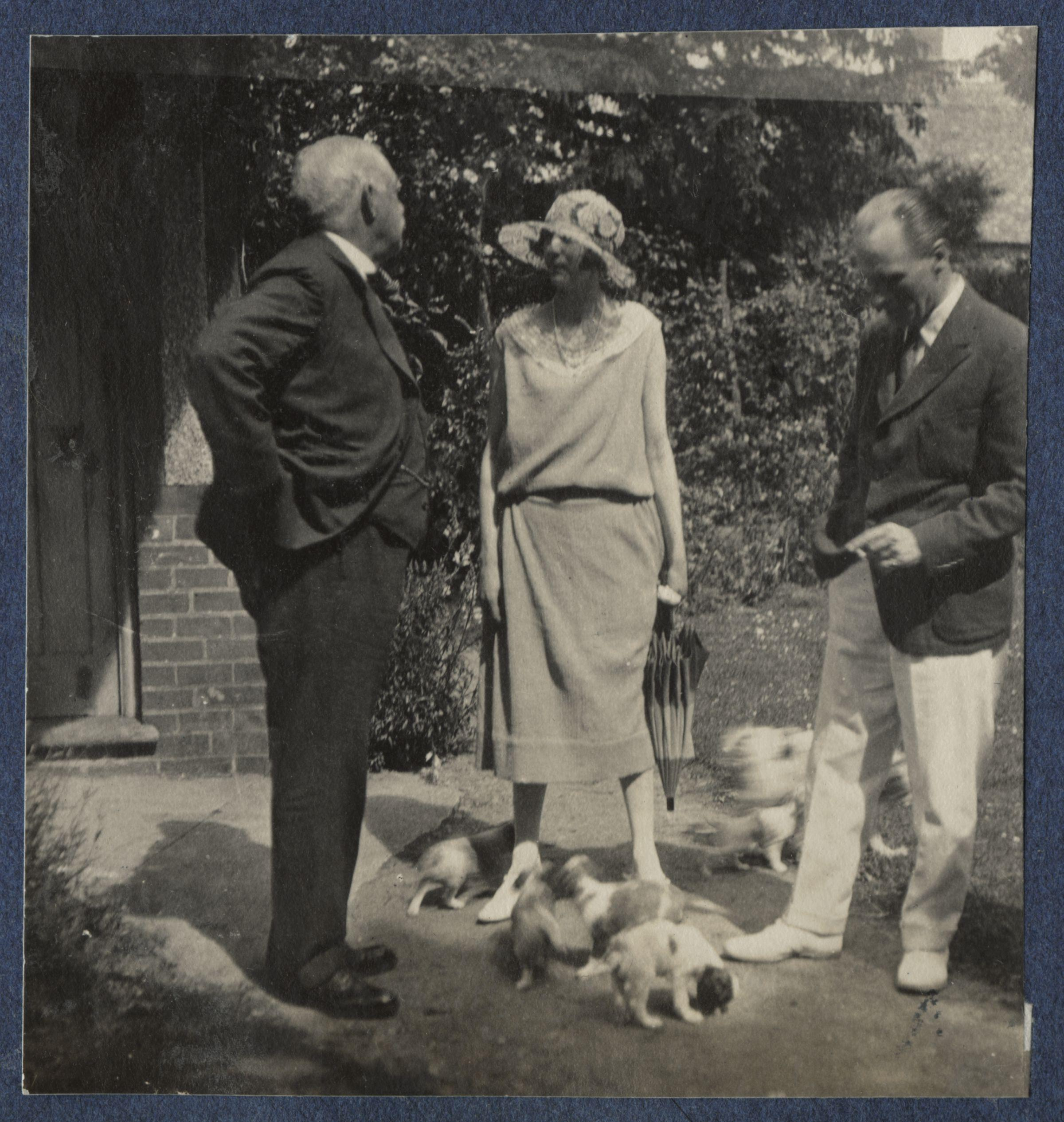
The Duke of Portland to the left with Rosamond Rose and an unknown man

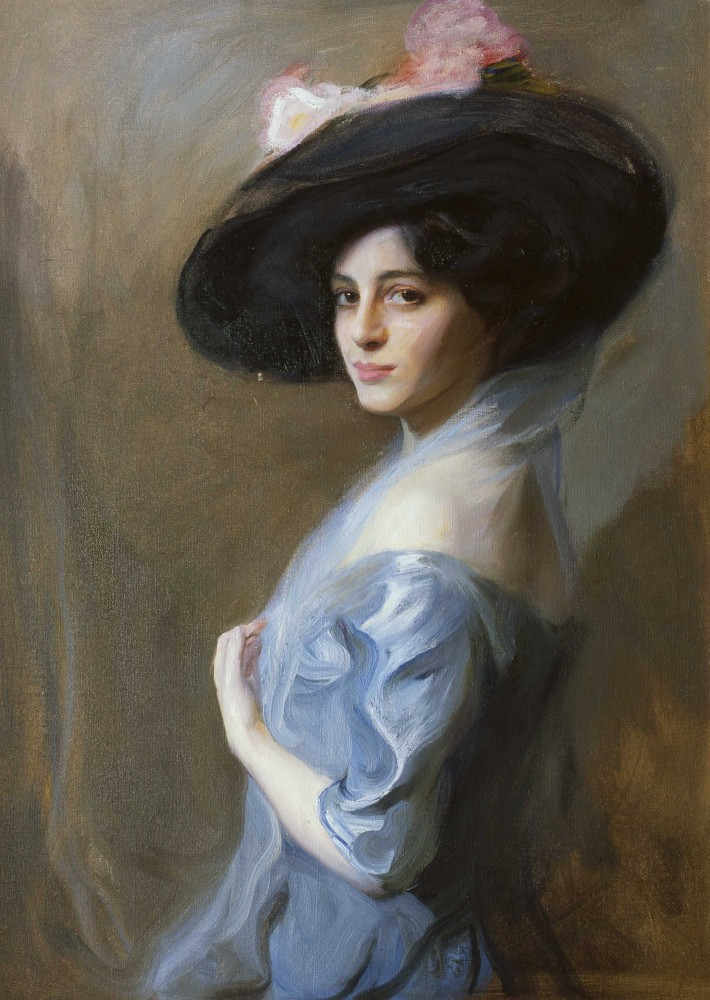
Portrait of his daughter, Lady Victoria, by Philip de Laszlo, 1911

Portland married Winifred Anna Dallas-Yorke, daughter of Thomas Dallas-Yorke, DL, JP, of Walmsgate, Lincolnshire, on 11 June 1889. They had three children:

- Lady Victoria Alexandrina Violet Cavendish-Bentinck (1890–1994), who married Captain Michael Erskine-Wemyss and had issue. She was the last surviving godchild of Queen Victoria.
- William Arthur Henry Cavendish-Bentinck, 7th Duke of Portland (1893–1977)
- Lord (Francis) Morven Dallas Cavendish-Bentinck (1900–1950), who died unmarried.

Their London residence (from 1890) was at 3 Grosvenor Square, where they lived until the building was demolished in 1936.

Portland died in April 1943, aged 85, and was interred at the traditional burial place of the Dukes of Portland in the churchyard of St Winifred's Church at Holbeck. He was succeeded by his eldest son, William. The Duchess of Portland died in July 1954, aged 90. The department of Manuscripts and Special Collections, The University of Nottingham holds estate papers of the 6th Duke in the Portland (London) Collection (Pl).

=== Benefaction and legacies ===
The Duke and Duchess of Portland were custodians and collectors of fine art. They were respectful and generous to the hundreds of staff they employed. One former servant, George Slingsby, who was employed as a footman at Welbeck Abbey before the First World War, wrote that "most of their staff had a job for life, were well cared for in the estate’s own hospital block when they were ill, and at such times nothing was deducted from their wages, at a time when the working classes had no privileges, or indeed any help from the Government."

His probate was sworn in 1943 at £201,516 (equivalent to about £7,900,000 in 2025), with his son as his heir.

== Arms ==
Coat of arms of William Cavendish-Bentinck, 6th Duke of Portland
Notes The title Duke of Portland was created by George I in 1716 . Coronet A Coronet of a Duke Crest Out of a ducal coronet proper two arms counter-embowed vested Gules, on the hands gloves Or, each holding an ostrich feather Argent (Bentinck); A snake nowed proper (Cavendish) Escutcheon Quarterly: 1st and 4th, Azure a cross moline Argent (Bentinck); 2nd and 3rd, Sable three stags' heads cabossed Argent attired Or, a crescent for difference (Cavendish) Supporters Two lions double queued, the dexter Or and the sinister sable Motto Craignez Honte (Fear Dishonour) Orders The Most Noble Order of the Garter – Knight Companion (KG)

== Publications ==
Portland was author of the following memoirs:

- Fifty Years and More of Sport in Scotland (1933)
- Memories of Racing and Hunting (1935)
- Men, Women and Things (1937)

Political offices
Preceded by The Earl of Cork	Master of the Horse; 1886–1892	Succeeded by The Viscount Oxenbridge
Preceded by The Earl of Cork	Master of the Horse; 1895–1905	Succeeded by The Earl of Sefton
Honorary titles
Preceded by The Earl of Caithness	Lord Lieutenant of Caithness; 1889–1919	Succeeded by Sir Archibald Sinclair, Bt
Preceded by The Duke of St Albans	Lord Lieutenant of Nottinghamshire; 1898–1939	Succeeded by Marquess of Titchfield
Preceded by The Bishop of Oxford	Chancellor of the Order of the Garter; 1937–1943	Succeeded by The Viscount Halifax
Preceded by The Duke of Connaught and Strathearn	Senior Privy Counsellor; 1942–1943	Succeeded by The Marquess of Crewe
Peerage of Great Britain
Preceded by William Cavendish-Scott-Bentinck	Duke of Portland; 1879–1943	Succeeded by William Cavendish-Bentinck
Peerage of the United Kingdom
Preceded by Augusta Cavendish-Bentinck	Baron Bolsover; 1893–1943	Succeeded by William Cavendish-Bentinck
