= 1890 in sports =

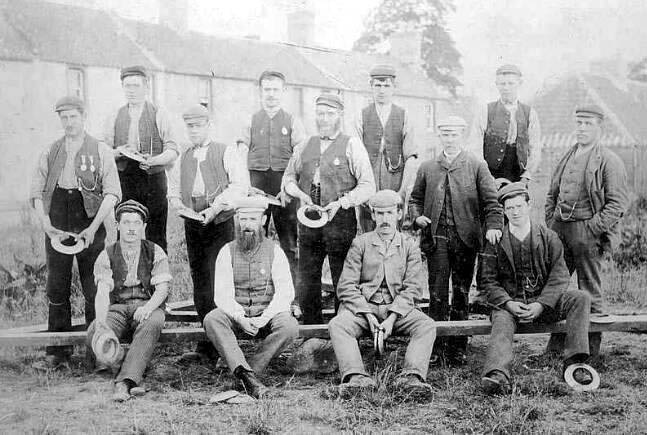
Tejo players of Club Atlético del Rosario; ca. 1890.

1890 in sports describes the year's events in world sport.

== Athletics ==
- USA Outdoor Track and Field Championships

== American football ==
College championship

- College football national championship – Harvard Crimson

Non-college amateur championships

- Western Pennsylvania champions – Allegheny Athletic Association

Events

- 11 October — Western University of Pennsylvania (later renamed the University of Pittsburgh) played its first ever football game in a 38–0 loss to the Allegheny Athletic Association, which was held at Exposition Park.
- 15 November — The Colorado Buffaloes play their first football game against the Denver Athletic Club.
- 22 November — College football is first played in the state of Kansas at the 1890 Kansas vs. Baker football game
- 29 November — The first Army–Navy Game is played. Navy wins 24–0.

== Association football ==
England

- The Football League – Preston North End 33 points, Everton 31, Blackburn Rovers 27, Wolves 25, West Bromwich Albion 25, Accrington FC 24
- FA Cup final – Blackburn Rovers 6–1 The Wednesday at The Oval
- For the 1890–91 Football League season, Stoke FC is expelled and replaced by Sunderland FC who will remain in the top flight continuously until 1958, a record of 68 seasons that only Arsenal's current run (since 1919) has beaten.
- Middlesbrough FC is split by a dispute over whether to turn professional or not. A breakaway group, who favour professionalism, form a new club called Middlesbrough Ironopolis which joins the Football League in 1893 but becomes bankrupt after only one season. Middlesbrough FC eventually turns professional in 1899 and is elected to the Football League at that time.

France

- Formation of the Union des Sociétés Françaises de Sports Athlétiques (USFSA), the principal governing body of football in France until 1919 when it is superseded by the Fédération Française de Football (FFF).

Scotland

- Scottish Cup final – Queen's Park 2–1 Vale of Leven (replay following 1–1 draw)
- The Scottish Football League (SFL) is founded as one division of 10 teams. Founder members are Abercorn, Cambuslang, Celtic, Cowlairs, Dumbarton, Hearts, Rangers, St Mirren, Third Lanark and Vale of Leven.

Spain

- Sevilla FC, officially founded on January 25.

== Australian Rules Football ==
- Victorian Football Association premiers - South Melbourne.
- SANFL premiers - Port Adelaide.
- WAFL premiers - Fremantle.

== Baseball ==
National championship

- National League v. American Association – Louisville Colonels (AA) ties Brooklyn Dodgers (NL) three games each.

Events

- The Players' League, initiated by the players' union, competes with the National League and American Association. It signs numerous leading players and is arguably the strongest league, but it survives for only one season.

== Boxing ==
Events

- 10 July — death by tuberculosis of Paddy Duffy, the reigning World Welterweight Champion. The title remains vacant until 1892.
- The inaugural World Featherweight Champion is Torpedo Billy Murphy of New Zealand who is recognised following his 14th-round knockout of Ike Weir at San Francisco on 13 January. Murphy is defeated by Young Griffo of Australia on 2 September at Sydney. Griffo retains the title until 1892 when he steps up to the lightweight division. The featherweight division is for fighters weighing between 118 and 126 lb, although the limit fluctuates somewhat in the division's early days.

Lineal world champions

- World Heavyweight Championship – John L. Sullivan
- World Middleweight Championship – Jack Nonpareil Dempsey
- World Welterweight Championship – Paddy Duffy → title vacant following death of Paddy Duffy
- World Lightweight Championship – Jack McAuliffe
- World Featherweight Championship – Torpedo Billy Murphy → Young Griffo

== Canadian Football ==
- The Dominion Championship is not held this year.
- The Ottawa College team retires from the league, resulting in a more competitive championship. Hamilton defeats Queen's University 8-6 in the final.
- Montreal suffers its first loss in the QRFU to McGill, which then defeats Victoria 41-0 to win the championship.
- Winnipeg wins the Northwest Championship for a 2nd time.

== Cricket ==
Events

- In South Africa, the inaugural Currie Cup is won by Transvaal
- The 1890 English cricket season is the first in which the County Championship is held officially. The champion county is Surrey who win nine out of fourteen games.
- England, captained by W. G. Grace, win The Ashes 2–0. One Test match is abandoned.

England

- County Championship – Surrey
- Most runs – William Gunn 1,621 @ 34.48 (HS 228)
- Most wickets – George Lohmann 220 @ 13.62 (BB 8–65)
- Wisden Five Great Wicket-Keepers – Jack Blackham, Gregor MacGregor, Dick Pilling, Mordecai Sherwin, Henry Wood

Australia

- Most runs – Jack Lyons 254 @ 63.50 (HS 134)
- Most wickets – Hugh Trumble 29 @ 14.20 (BB 8–110)

South Africa

- Currie Cup – Transvaal

== Golf ==
Major tournaments

- British Open – John Ball

Other tournaments

- British Amateur – John Ball

== Horse racing ==
England

- Grand National – Ilex
- 1,000 Guineas Stakes – Semolina
- 2,000 Guineas Stakes – Surefoot
- The Derby – Sainfoin
- The Oaks – Memoir
- St. Leger Stakes – Memoir

Australia

- Melbourne Cup – Carbine

Canada

- Queen's Plate – Kitestring

Ireland

- Irish Grand National – Greek Girl
- Irish Derby Stakes – Kentish Fire

USA

- Kentucky Derby – Riley
- Preakness Stakes – Montague
- Belmont Stakes – Burlington

== Ice hockey ==
Events

- 4 March 4 — the Montreal Hockey Club defeats the Montreal Victorias 2–1 to retain the 1890 AHAC season title.
- 19 November 19 — the Ottawa City Hockey League is founded to administer ice hockey in the area of Ottawa, Ontario, Canada.
- 27 November 27 — the Ontario Hockey Association is founded to administer ice hockey in Ontario, Canada.

== Lacrosse ==
Events

- The first ever women's lacrosse game is played at the St Leonards School in Scotland.

== Rowing ==
The Boat Race

- 26 March — Oxford wins the 47th Oxford and Cambridge Boat Race

== Rugby football ==
Home Nations Championship

- The 8th series is contested by England, Ireland, Scotland and Wales. England and Scotland share the title with two wins apiece.

== Tennis ==
England

- Wimbledon Men's Singles Championship – Willoughby Hamilton (GB) defeats William Renshaw (GB) 6–8 6–2 3–6 6–1 6–1
- Wimbledon Women's Singles Championship – Lena Rice (GB) defeats May Jacks (GB) 6–4 6–1

USA

- American Men's Singles Championship – Oliver Campbell (USA) defeats Henry Slocum (USA) 6–2 4–6 6–3 6–1
- American Women's Singles Championship – Ellen Roosevelt (USA) defeats Bertha Townsend (USA) 6–2 6–2
