= Visto =

Visto may refer to:

- Kia Visto, a Hyundai city car
- Visto (rapper), American rapper and singer-songwriter
- Sir Visto, British Thoroughbred racehorse and sire
