= Nun Nicer =

British-bred Thoroughbred racehorse

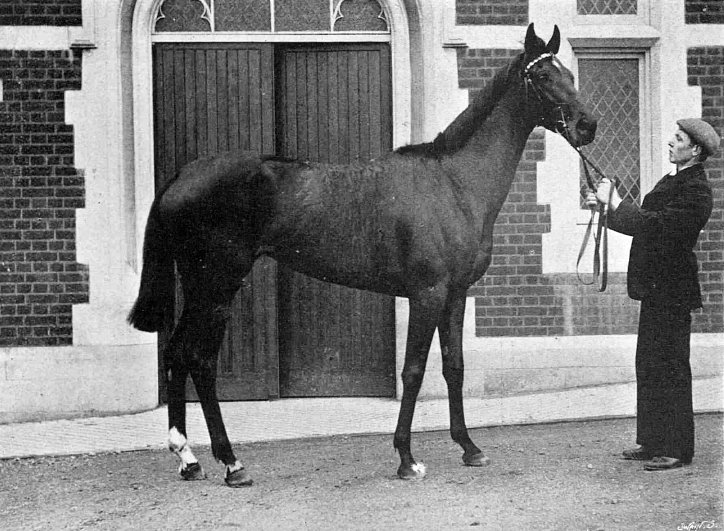
- Nun Nicer in 1898.
- Sire: Common
- Grandsire: Isonomy
- Dam: Priestess
- Damsire: Hermit
- Sex: Mare
- Foaled: 1895
- Country: United Kingdom
- Colour: Bay
- Breeder: Sir John Blundell Maple, 1st Baronet
- Owner: John Blundell Maple
- Trainer: Willie Waugh
- Record: 23: 8-6-2

Major wins
- Manchester Summer Foal Plate (1897); Hopeful Stakes (1897); 1000 Guineas (1898); Triennial Stakes (1898); September Stakes (1898); Palatine Plate (1898); Preis von Donausschingen (1899)

Nun Nicer (1895–1915) was a British Thoroughbred racehorse and broodmare. As a two-year-old in 1897 she ran consistently, winning three of her nine races including the Manchester Summer Foal Plate and Hopeful Stakes as well as being placed on four occasions. In the following year she won the 1000 Guineas, Triennial Stakes, September Stakes and Palatine Plate and finished second in the Epsom Oaks and Coronation Stakes. As a four-year-old she ran second in the Stewards' Cup and won the Preis von Donausschingen in Germany. She made no impact as a broodmare.

== Background ==
Nun Nicer was a bay mare bred by her owner John Blundell Maple at his Childwick Stud in Hertfordshire. During her racing career he was handled by Maple's private trainer William Waugh at the Falmouth House stable in Newmarket, Suffolk. She was described as a "beautiful filly, clean, wiry, bloodlike" but "light and short of substance". Waugh stated after her first season that "she always eats up and has never been amiss but she's of a restless temperament and we can't get flesh onto her". Her name attracted some criticism, being described by one journalist as "absolutely banal", but did not prevent at least one little girl in England being given the name "Nun Nicer" by her parents in 1898.

She was the best horse sired by Common, who won the Triple Crown for Maple in 1891 but was not a success as a breeding stallion. Nun Nicer's dam Priestess was a half-sister to Mimi (1000 Guineas and Epsom Oaks) and a good racehorse in her own right, winning the Somerville Tattersall Stakes against male opposition in 1891. Priestess' other female-line descendants included Vatellor, who sired Pearl Diver and My Love. Maple had purchased Common and Priestess for 15,000 guineas and 4,000 guineas respectively.

== Racing career ==
=== 1897: two-year-old season ===
Nun Nicer began her racing career in the spring of 1897, running promisingly on her racecourse debut before winning the Bedford Plate at Newmarket Racecourse. In her first major race, Nun Nicer started at odds of 100/12 for the Royal Plate over five furlongs at Kempton Park Racecourse on 14 May and finished third behind the gelding Chon Kina and the colt Dielytra. At Manchester Racecourse on 9 June the filly started at odds of 7/1 for the Breeders' Foal Plate and won by a length from the favourite Longtown having taken the lead two furlongs from the finish. At Royal Ascot later that month she finished second to the colt Cyllene in the Triennial Stakes.

In the autumn edition of Manchester's Breeders' Foal Plate on 23 September Nun Nicer was beaten half a length by Wildfowler, a colt who went on to win the 1898 St Leger. Six days later at Newmarket Racecourse the filly won the Hopeful Stakes, beating the odds-on favourite Cap Martin. On 21 October at Sandown Park Nun Nicer was assigned top weight of 131 pounds and ran second to the colt Ninus (to whom she was conceding 12 pounds) in the Great Sapling Plate. On her only other start of the year she was unplaced when 4/1 second favourite for the Free Handicap at Newmarket.

=== 1898: three-year-old season ===
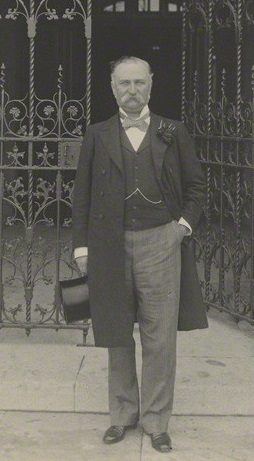
Nun Nicer's owner John Blundell Maple

On Friday 29 April 1898 Nun Nicer contested the 85th edition of the 1000 Guineas over the Rowley Mile at Newmarket and started the 11/2 joint-favourite alongside St Ia. The best fancied of the other thirteen runners were Airosa, Lowood and Ayah. Ridden by Sam Loates she was restrained towards the rear of the field as her stablemate Royal Footstep contested the early lead with St Ia. Entering the last quarter mile Nun Nicer moved up into third place behind Airs and Graces and Alt Mark who were racing on opposite sides of the course. She took the lead inside the final furlong and won by a length from Airs and Graces with Alt Mark three-quarters of a length back in third.

At Epsom Racecourse on 27 May, with Loates again in the saddle, Nun Nicer started even-money favourite for the Oaks Stakes. After tracking the leaders she moved into second place in the straight but could make no further progress and finished runner-up, beaten three lengths by Airs and Graces. At Royal Ascot in June Nun Nicer finished second to Lowood in the Coronation Stakes, conceding 13 pounds to the winner, and coming home a length and a half clear of Airs and Graces in third. Two days later at the same meeting she started at odds of 2/1 in a three-runner field for the Triennial Stakes over 7 1/2 furlongs. Ridden by Charles Wood and carrying top weight of 129 pounds, she took the lead in the straight and drew away to win by three lengths from the colt Greenan. Nun Nicer was back in action a week later when she finished third to the colt Addendum in the Foal Stakes over one mile at Sandown Park, conceding eleven pounds to the winner. At Lingfield Park on 9 July the filly started the 7/4 favourite for the £1,175 Imperial Stakes over one mile but after taking the lead in the straight she was overtaken in the closing stages and finished fourth behind Schonberg, Bend Sinister and Lowood.

On 2 September at Sandown Nun Nicer started at the unusual odds of 1/50 for the September Stakes over one mile and won "in a canter" by two lengths from Simon Pure, her only opponent. Three weeks later the filly started 2/7 favourite for the £1,084 Palatine Plate at Manchester and won very easily having "sailed to the front" in the straight. On 26 October Nun Nicer carried a weight of 102 pounds in the Cambridgeshire Handicap at Newmarket, but after disputing the lead approaching the final furlong she dropped out of contention and finished tenth behind the six-year-old mare Georgic.

Nun Nicer's earnings for the year totaled £7,025.

=== 1899: four-year-old season ===
Nun Nicer began her third season in the Lincolnshire Handicap on 21 March and finished unplaced behind General Peace. She also ran unplaced in the Jubilee Handicap at Kempton Park Racecourse, being one of several horses to become distressed and agitated by a badly managed and repeatedly delayed start. She subsequently ran unplaced in the Royal Hunt Cup at Ascot on 14 June. At Goodwood Racecourse on 25 July Nun Nicer, carrying a weight of 112 pounds started at odds of 8/1 for the Stewards' Cup over six furlongs. She went to the front inside the final furlong but was worn down in the closing strides and beaten a neck by the five-year-old horse Northern Farmer, to whom she was attempting to concede eight pounds. In September the filly was sent to race in Germany and stepped up in distance for the Preis von Donausschingen over eleven furlongs at Cologne. She started the odds-on favourite and won easily, earning a prize of approximately £1,250 and gold cup presented by Prince Furstenberg.

== Breeding record ==
Nun Nicer was retired from racing to become a broodmare. She was exported to Germany in 1904 with her colt but returned in 1906. Her reported foals included:

- Bay filly, foaled in 1900, sired by Royal Hampton or Childwick
- Childs Nun, a chestnut filly, foaled in 1902, sired by Childwick
- Lady Mac, a bay filly foaled in 1903, sired by Mackintosh
- Bay colt, foaled in 1904, sired by Mackintosh or Royal Hampton
- La Perouse, a bay filly foaled in 1909, sired by Laveno. She was sent to Germany in 1912.
- Amador, colt, 1910, by Eager

Nun Nicer did not produce a living foal after 1910 and died in 1915.

== Pedigree ==
Pedigree of Nun Nicer (GB), bay mare, 1895
Sire Common (GB) 1888	Isonomy; 1875	Sterling	Oxford
Sire Common (GB) 1888	Isonomy; 1875	Sterling	Whisper
Sire Common (GB) 1888	Isonomy; 1875	Isola Bella	Stockwell
Sire Common (GB) 1888	Isonomy; 1875	Isola Bella	Isoline
Sire Common (GB) 1888	Thistle; 1875	Scottish Chief	Lord of the Isles
Sire Common (GB) 1888	Thistle; 1875	Scottish Chief	Miss Ann
Sire Common (GB) 1888	Thistle; 1875	The Flower Safety	Wild Dayrell
Sire Common (GB) 1888	Thistle; 1875	The Flower Safety	Nettle
Dam Priestess (GB) 1889	Hermit; 1864	Newminster	Touchstone
Dam Priestess (GB) 1889	Hermit; 1864	Newminster	Beeswing
Dam Priestess (GB) 1889	Hermit; 1864	Seclusion	Tadmor
Dam Priestess (GB) 1889	Hermit; 1864	Seclusion	Miss Sellon
Dam Priestess (GB) 1889	Lord Lyon mare 1870	Lord Lyon	Stockwell
Dam Priestess (GB) 1889	Lord Lyon mare 1870	Lord Lyon	Paradigm
Dam Priestess (GB) 1889	Lord Lyon mare 1870	Sadie	Voltigeur
Dam Priestess (GB) 1889	Lord Lyon mare 1870	Sadie	Juliet (Family: 12-f)
