= Common (horse) =

British-bred Thoroughbred racehorse

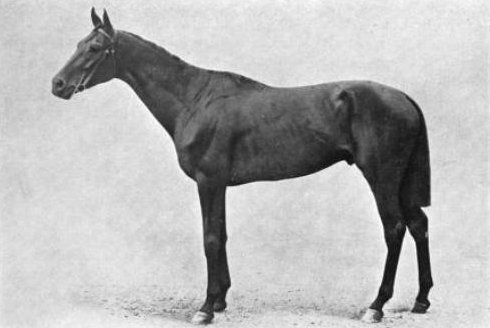
- Circa 1891 photograph by Clarence Hailey.
- Sire: Isonomy
- Grandsire: Sterling
- Dam: Thistle
- Damsire: Scottish Chief
- Sex: Stallion
- Foaled: 1888
- Country: United Kingdom of Great Britain and Ireland
- Colour: Brown
- Breeder: Henry Sturt, 1st Baron Alington
- Owner: Sir Frederick Johnstone, 8th Baronet and Lord Alington; Sir John Blundell Maple, 1st Baronet
- Trainer: John Porter
- Record: 5: 4-0-1
- Earnings: £

Major wins
- 2000 Guineas (1891); Epsom Derby (1891); St. James's Palace Stakes (1891); St. Leger Stakes (1891)

Common (1888–1912) was a British Thoroughbred racehorse and sire. In a career that lasted from May to September 1891 he ran five times and won four races. He became the fifth, and the most lighty-raced horse to win the English Triple Crown by winning the 2000 Guineas at Newmarket, the Derby at Epsom and the St Leger at Doncaster.

== Background ==
Common was a “big, lathy, sinewy” brown horse, standing just over 16 hands high bred at Crichel in Dorset by Henry Sturt, 1st Baron Alington who owned him during his racing career in partnership with Sir Frederick Johnstone. The colt was sent into training with John Porter at Kingsclere, and was ridden in all his races by George Barrett. Common's sire Isonomy was one of the outstanding British racehorses of the 19th Century, winning the Ascot Gold Cup in 1879 and 1880. He went on to become a successful stallion; apart from Common he sired Isinglass, thus being the first of two horses to father two winners of the English Triple Crown. Common's dam Thistle, who had been a successful racehorse, went on to produce the New Stakes winner Goldfinch and the filly Throstle who won the St Leger in 1894.

== Racing career ==
=== 1891: three-year-old season ===
==== Spring: 2000 Guineas ====
Common was very immature as a two-year-old and Porter decided not to race him. In the spring of 1891 Common showed significant progress and produced impressive performances in training. Before he appeared on the racecourse his potential was noted by the Sporting Times who described him as an "exceedingly fine" colt. In a gallop viewed by his owners together with the Prince of Wales he easily defeated his stable companions Gone Coon and Orion, leading Porter to name the colt as a likely Classic winner. In the 2000 Guineas on 29 April he started at odds of 9/1 in a field of nine, with the French-trained Gouverneur and Peter Flower heading the betting. Shortly before the start his odds had drifted out from 7/1 with one commentator suggesting that the public were put off by his unappealing name. The runners made an even break and raced in a line across the wide Newmarket straight. Two furlongs from the finish Peter Flower showed in front but was immediately overtaken by Common who pulled clear "without an effort" and won very easily by three lengths from Orvieto, with Peter Flower in third.

==== Summer: Epsom Derby ====
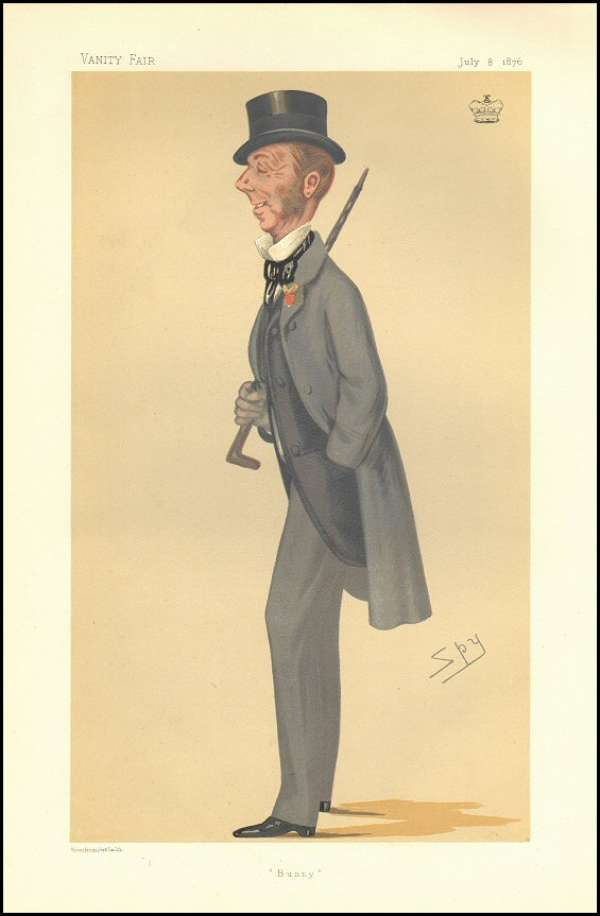
Henry Sturt by Spy in 1876.

At Epsom on 27 May, Common started 10/11 favourite in a field of eleven for the Derby. The conditions for the race were difficult, with mist, hail, driving rain and very soft ground. Gouverneur, whose rider's orange jacket made him one of the more visible runners, led the field in the early running, with Common first being sighted in fifth place just after half way. The French colt turned into the straight in front, with Common improving in fourth. Barrett produced Common to dispute the lead two furlongs from the finish. After racing alongside Gouverneur for a few strides, Barrett, riding in the "coolest manner" sent him clear to win "in a canter" by two lengths. Common had been heavily backed and his win was enthusiastically received despite the conditions. The rain had been so heavy that the sodden jockeys returned from the race up to three pounds heavier, and Barrett's face was described as having "enough mud on it to plant potatoes in."

Common was then sent to Royal Ascot for the St. James's Palace Stakes. Only one horse, Barbatello, opposed him and he won easily. His next race was the Eclipse Stakes at Sandown Park Racecourse in which he faced older horses for the first time. Common started favourite at 1/2 ahead of the four-year-olds Memoir and Surefoot. Common disputed the lead with Gouverneur from the start until the closing stages when the two three-year-olds were joined by Surefoot. In a "most exciting" finish, Surefoot prevailed by half a length, with Gouverneur beating Common for second by a short head.

==== Autumn: St Leger ====
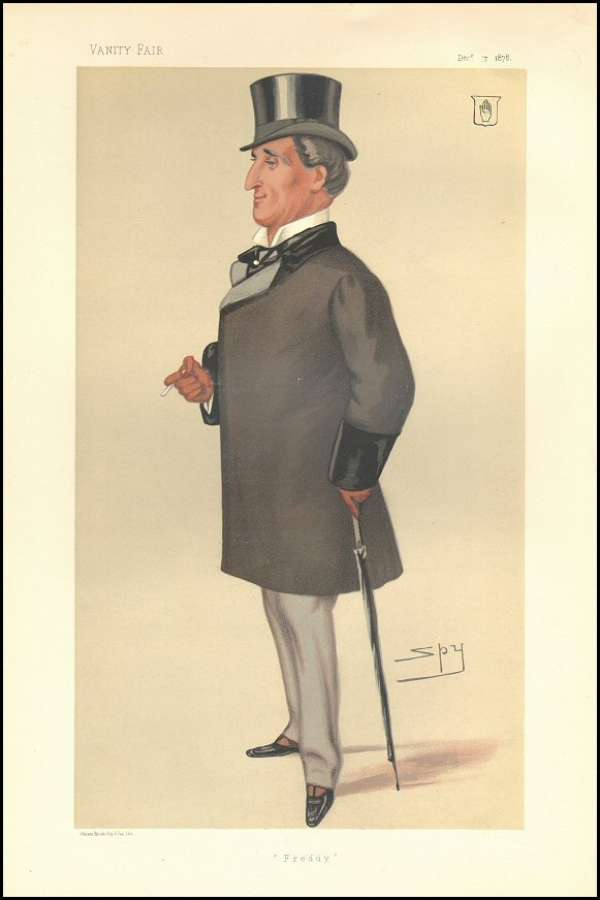
Frederick Johnstone, by Spy 1878.

Common was then sent to Doncaster for the St Leger on 10 September in an attempt to complete the Triple Crown. His main challenger appeared to be the filly Mimi who was bidding to complete her own version of the Triple Crown, having won both the 1000 Guineas and the Oaks. Common started 4/5 favourite ahead of Mimi on 5/1 and the heavily-backed French colt Reverend on 11/2. Reverend took an early lead, and set a strong pace in an attempt to expose any weaknesses in Common's stamina. The French colt maintained his lead into the straight, just ahead of Common and the outsider St Simon of the Rock. Common came under pressure and appeared to be beaten but responded well and a furlong from the finish the three colts were level. In the closing stages Common began to pull ahead and after a "splendid race" he crossed the line a length in front of Reverend, with St Simon of the Rock a neck away in third. The race was described by one London correspondent as "one of the finest that have been witnessed in the North for many years."

Shortly after his win in the St Leger, Common's owners sold the colt for £15,000 to John Blundell Maple, the Conservative M.P. and owner of the Childwick Bury Stud, having previously turned down an offer of £14,000 from the Austrian government. Blundell Maple attempted to arrange a match race between Common and the Doncaster Cup winner Queen's Birthday over two miles, but his challenge was not accepted. Porter refused to train for Blundell Maple and as a result, Common did not race again and was retired to stud.

== Assessment ==
Porter said of Common that if he had stayed in training he would have “proved one of the greatest Cup horses of modern times."

== Stud career ==
Common was not a success at stud, a fact illustrated by his stud fee, which fell from 200 guineas in his first season to 19 guineas. He did sire one very good horse in the filly Nun Nicer who won the 1000 Guineas in 1898. Common died on 17 December 1912, at a stud near Chelmsford, Essex.

== Sire line tree ==
- Common
  - Martin
  - Osbech
  - Uncommon
    - Czar
  - Cottager
  - Charcot
  - Mushroom
    - Beaumont
      - Beausart
      - Beguin
        - Bayeux
        - Banco
          - Bouboule
            - Boulou
              - Saint Nicholas
              - Bourgueil
      - Fremonto
        - Charleston
        - Charpino
      - Karamont
        - Koridon
        - Kalgan
      - Samson
      - Cent Seize

== Pedigree ==
Pedigree of Common (GB), brown stallion, 1888
Sire Isonomy (GB) 1875	Sterling; 1868	Oxford	Birdcatcher*
Sire Isonomy (GB) 1875	Sterling; 1868	Oxford	Honey Dear
Sire Isonomy (GB) 1875	Sterling; 1868	Whisper	Flatcatcher*
Sire Isonomy (GB) 1875	Sterling; 1868	Whisper	Silence
Sire Isonomy (GB) 1875	Isola Bella; 1868	Stockwell	The Baron*
Sire Isonomy (GB) 1875	Isola Bella; 1868	Stockwell	Pocahontas
Sire Isonomy (GB) 1875	Isola Bella; 1868	Isoline	Ethelbert
Sire Isonomy (GB) 1875	Isola Bella; 1868	Isoline	Bassishaw
Dam Thistle (GB) 1875	Scottish Chief; 1861	Lord of the Isles	Touchstone*
Dam Thistle (GB) 1875	Scottish Chief; 1861	Lord of the Isles	Fair Helen
Dam Thistle (GB) 1875	Scottish Chief; 1861	Miss Ann	The Little Known
Dam Thistle (GB) 1875	Scottish Chief; 1861	Miss Ann	Bay Missy
Dam Thistle (GB) 1875	The Flower Safety; 1860	Wild Dayrell	Ion
Dam Thistle (GB) 1875	The Flower Safety; 1860	Wild Dayrell	Ellen Middleton
Dam Thistle (GB) 1875	The Flower Safety; 1860	Nettle	Sweatmeat
Dam Thistle (GB) 1875	The Flower Safety; 1860	Nettle	Wasp (Family: 4)

* Common is inbred 4S x 5S to the stallion Birdcatcher, meaning that he appears fourth generation and fifth generation (via The Baron) on the sire side of his pedigree.

* Common is inbred 5S x 4D to the stallion Touchstone, meaning that he appears fifth generation (via Flatcatcher) on the sire side of his pedigree, and fourth generation on the dam side of his pedigree.
