= Fred Rickaby =

English flat racing jockey

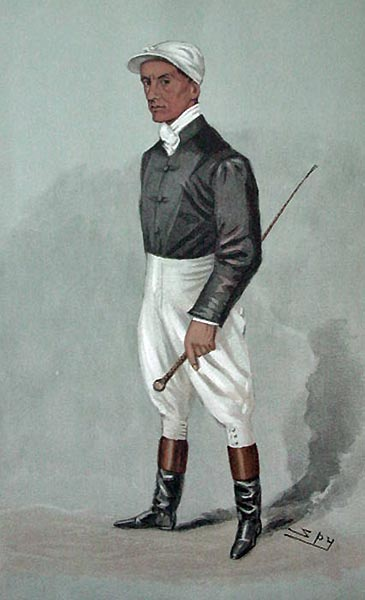
- Caricature of Fred Rickaby, published in Vanity Fair, 12 September 1901

Personal information
- Born: 24 September 1869 Hungerford
- Died: 20 December 1941 (aged 72) Hove
- Occupation: Jockey

Horse racing career
- Sport: Horse racing

Major racing wins
- Major race wins: 1000 Guineas Stakes (1891); Oaks Stakes (1891, 1896); Ascot Gold Cup (1901); Dewhurst Stakes (1890)

Significant horses
- Canterbury Pilgrim, Mimi

Frederick Edward Rickaby (1869 – 1941) was an English flat racing jockey, who won three fillies' Classics. He is usually referred to as Fred Rickaby Sr. to distinguish him from his son and grandson, both successful jockeys in their own right.

== Early life ==
Rickaby was born Frederick Edward Rickaby to John Rickaby in Hungerford. John's father, another Fred Rickaby, had trained the 1855 Derby winner, Wild Dayrell.

== Career ==
Rickaby's first ride was a surprise victory on Fireball at Kempton Park on 6 April 1885, narrowly ahead of Fred Archer. After several false starts, Archer had seen the young Rickaby "looking a bit shaky" and told him, "Here, youngster, come next to me, and jump off when I do." Rickaby did as Archer instructed, but to Archer's chagrin, got ahead and stayed ahead to win at 33/1. In his first season, he went on to ride a respectable 16 winners.

He then joined the stable of Mathew Dawson, one of the pre-eminent trainers of the era. By 1890, he had the third most rides of any jockey and was fifth in the jockeys' table, riding primarily for the Dawson and Sadler stables for owners such as the Duke of St Albans, Lord Durham and Lord Rosebery, as well as replacing the Australian jockey Boase in riding for the Hon. James White. He rode Corstorphine, winner of the 1890 Dewhurst Stakes

The following year, prior to the traditional start of the season at Lincoln, it was reported that he and several other prominent jockeys, including the Loates brothers, Sam and Tommy were refused licences for their part in what was described as either an alleged jockeys' ring or for "foul riding". However, he went on to win the two fillies classics of 1891 on Mimi.

In 1893, he became stable jockey to George Lambton and in 1896, won another Oaks on Canterbury Pilgrim, a filly who had been bought from the disposal of the Duchess of Montrose's estate when she died in 1894. The horse he considered the best he rode was Santoi, who won the Ascot Gold Cup of 1901 as 11/10 favourite.

In March 1902, he was denied a licence again after associating with "persons of bad character". His ban was lifted in April 1904.

== Personal life ==
He had three children - Fred, Iris (mother of Lester Piggott) and Florence, who married two Classic-winning jockeys, William Griggs and Fred Lane.

He retired to Hove in 1908 and died in 1941, leaving £19,886.

== Major wins ==
(United Kingdom) Great Britain

- 1000 Guineas Stakes – Mimi (1891)
- Oaks Stakes – Mimi (1891), Canterbury Pilgrim (1896)
- Ascot Gold Cup – Santoi (1901)
- Dewhurst Stakes – Corstorphine (1890)
- Goodwood Cup – Mazagan (1900)

== See also ==
- List of jockeys

== Bibliography ==
- Mortimer, Roger; Onslow, Richard; Willett, Peter (1978). Biographical Encyclopaedia of British Racing. London: Macdonald and Jane's. ISBN 0-354-08536-0.
- Tanner, Michael; Cranham, Gerry (1992). Great Jockeys of the Flat. Enfield, Middlesex: Guinness Publishing. ISBN 0-85112-989-7.
