= HMS Sainfoin =

1943 infantry landing ship in the British Royal navy

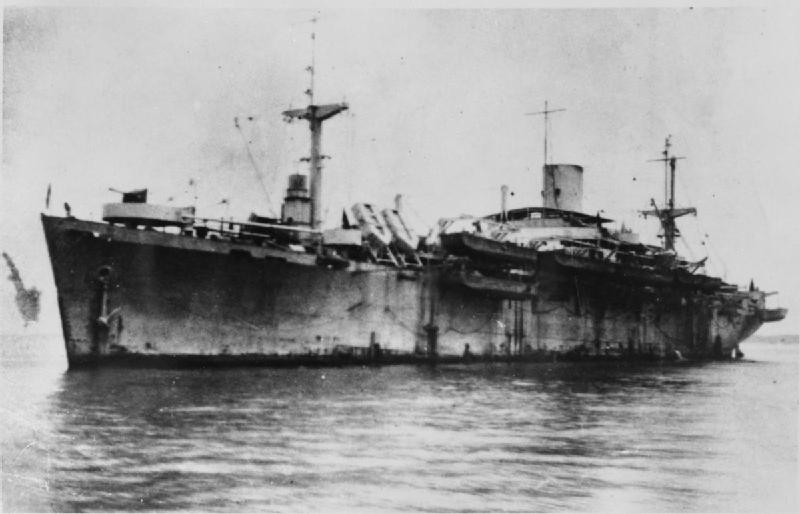
- HMS Sainfoin in Singapore, 1945

History
- Name: Cape Washington (1943–44); Empire Crossbow (1944); HMS Sainfoin (1944–46); Empire Crossbow (1946–47); Cape Washington (1947–64)
- Owner: United States Maritime Commission (1943–44); Ministry of War Transport (1944); Royal Navy (1944–46); Ministry of Transport (1946–47); United States Maritime Commission (1947–64)
- Operator: United States Maritime Commission (1943–44); Ministry of War Transport (1944); Royal Navy (1944–46); Ministry of Transport (1946–47); United States Maritime Commission (1947)
- Builder: Consolidated Steel Corporation, Wilmington, California
- Yard number: 357
- Launched: 30 November 1943
- Completed: 31 January 1944
- Commissioned: November 1944
- Decommissioned: September 1946
- Maiden voyage: 7 February 1944
- Out of service: 1948
- Home port: (United Kingdom) London (1944); (United Kingdom) Royal Navy (1944–46); (United Kingdom) London (1946–47); United States (1947–64)
- Identification: United Kingdom Official Number 169808 (1944, 1946–47); Code Letters MYMV (1944, 1946–47); Pennant Number F183 (1944–46)
- Fate: Sold for scrapping in 1964

General characteristics
- Class & type: Landing Ship, Infantry
- Tonnage: 7,177 GRT; 4,823 NRT; 6,440 DWT
- Length: 396 ft 5 in (120.83 m) between perpendiculars; 417 ft 9 in (127.33 m) overall
- Beam: 60 ft 1 in (18.31 m)
- Depth: 35 ft 0 in (10.67 m)
- Propulsion: Two steam turbines, double reduction geared driving a single screw propeller
- Speed: 16 knots (30 km/h) (service); 18 knots (33 km/h) (maximum)
- Troops: 1,500
- Armament: Empire Crossbow and HMS Sainfoin: 1 × 4-inch (102 mm) gun; 1 × 12-pounder (3-inch (76 mm)) gun; 12 × 20 mm (0.8 in) anti-aircraft guns; 2 × 4.7-inch (119 mm) guns; 18 × LCA

HMS Sainfoin was a landing ship, infantry of the Royal Navy that was built in 1943 by Consolidated Steel Corporation, Wilmington, California, United States as the merchant vessel Cape Washington. She was transferred to the Ministry of War Transport in 1944 and renamed Empire Crossbow. Later that year, she was requisitioned by the Royal Navy and commissioned as HMS Sainfoin, with the pennant number F183. In 1946, she was returned to merchant service as Empire Crossbow. She was transferred to the United States in 1947 and renamed Cape Washington. The ship was then laid up until scrapped in 1964.

== Description ==
The ship was built in 1944 by Consolidated Steel Corporation, Wilmington, California. She was Yard Number 357.

The ship was 396 feet 5 inches (120.83 m) long between perpendiculars, 417 feet 9 inches (127.33 m) overall, with a beam of 60 feet 1 inch (18.31 m). She had a depth of 35 feet 0 inches (10.67 m). She was assessed at 7,177 GRT, 4,823 NRT. Her DWT was 6,440.

The ship was propelled by two steam turbines of 12,000 nhp total. They were double reduction geared, driving a single screw propeller. They could propel her at a maximum speed of 18 knots (33 km/h), with 16 knots (30 km/h) being the normal service speed. The turbines were built by Westinghouse Electric & Manufacturing Co, Essington, Pennsylvania.

== History ==
Built as the merchant vessel Cape Washington, the ship was launched on 30 November 1943, and completed on 31 January 1944 as the landing ship Empire Crossbow. She was transferred to the British Ministry of War Transport under the Lend-Lease scheme. The Official Number 168908 and Code Letters MYMV were allocated. Her port of registry was London. Empire Crossbow departed from Wilmington on her maiden voyage on 7 February 1944. She sailed via the Panama Canal to Bermuda, sustaining some damage in storms in the Caribbean. At Bermuda, it was estimated that repairs would take 14 days to complete. Empire Crossbow joined a convoy and departed Bermuda on 24 February, the day she had arrived there. She arrived at Greenock, Renfrewshire on 6 March. Empire Crossbow departed the River Clyde on 26 March and sailed via Milford Haven, Pembrokeshire and Weymouth Bay, Dorset to the Cowes Roads, of the Isle of Wight, arriving on 30 March.

During Operation Overlord (the D-Day landings), Empire Crossbow, under the command of Captain Alexander Rodger, carried A and B Company, Hampshire Regiment, with C and D company on Empire Arquebus. They were landed on Gold Beach. The Hampshires achieved their objective to capture Le Hamel and Arromanches, Lower Normandy. Empire Crossbow lost three Landing Craft Assaults (LCAs) during the landings. She then returned to Southampton, sailing on 7 June as a member of Convoy EWP 1, which arrived at the Seine Bay on 8 June. On 29 June, Empire Crossbow embarked aircrew from 507th Fighter Squadron at Southampton, Hampshire and landed them at Saint-Laurent-sur-Mer, Lower Normandy. In September, Empire Crossbow embarked troops from the 2nd Battalion, Oxfordshire and Buckinghamshire Light Infantry at Arromanches and took them to Southampton, from where they were to go to Bulford Camp, on Salisbury Plain, Wiltshire.

Empire Crossbow was transferred to the Royal Navy and commissioned as HMS Sainfoin in November 1944. She was named after the racehorse Sainfoin, the winner of the 1890 Epsom Derby. Her armament consisted of 1 × 4-inch (102 mm) gun, 1 × 12-pounder (3-inch (76.2 mm)) gun, 12 × 20 mm (0.8 in) anti-aircraft guns, and 2 × 4.7-inch (119 mm) guns. She also carried 18 LCAs and could accommodate 1,500 troops.

HMS Sainfoin sailed to Greenock to embark Royal Marines from 553 flotilla. She then sailed to Bombay, India, where she received orders to sail to Karachi, India. Sainfoin participated in troop landing exercises in preparation for Operation Zipper. She landed troops in Rangoon, Burma, in June 1945. She proceeded to Penang, Port Dixon, and Port Swettenham, Malaya; the Port Swettenham landings took place on 9 September. She proceeded to Medan, Indonesia, and Singapore. On 3 October, Sainfoin anchored at Emmahaven, Indonesia, where the commanders-in-chief of the Japanese forces in Sumatra signed the surrender document on HMS Persimmon.

On 16 October 1945, during Sainfoin's voyage back to the United Kingdom, Sainfoin received a distress call from the hospital ship SS Takliwa, which was carrying 820 repatriated prisoners of war from Hong Kong to Madras, India. It took Sainfoin four hours to reach Takliwa, which had run aground at Indira Point, Great Nicobar, and caught fire. Using her LCAs, Sainfoin rescued all 1,083 people on board Takliwa, as well as the ship's cat. During the rescue, three of Sainfoin's LCAs were lost. Sainfoin's mascot, a baboon named Mortimer, took a liking to the cat. On arrival at Bombay, the cat promptly went ashore. Mortimer's intended fate was to be given to a zoo in the United Kingdom, but he grew too big and dangerous, so he was euthanased before Sainfoin reached the United Kingdom.

Post-war, Sainfoin assisted in mopping up operations in the Dutch East Indies. On one occasion, a pregnant woman went into labour whilst men from Sainfoin were assisting in one such operation. She was transferred to the ship for medical attention. A healthy baby boy was born on board. He was given the name Sainfoin. Sainfoin was at Singapore when the news came through that she was to be paid off. She sailed the following day; her destination was Greenock. A number of her crew volunteered for service on the voyage to return the ship to the United States, but their request was denied.

HMS Sainfoin was returned to merchant service, with the name reverting to Empire Crossbow in September 1946. She was returned to the United States in September 1946 and re-entered merchant service under her original name, Cape Washington, the following year. She was laid up in the James River until 1964, when she was sold on 1 December for $47,206 to Peck Iron & Metal Co for dismantling. Cape Washington was scrapped at Portsmouth, Virginia.
