= Barcaldine (horse) =

Irish-bred Thoroughbred racehorse

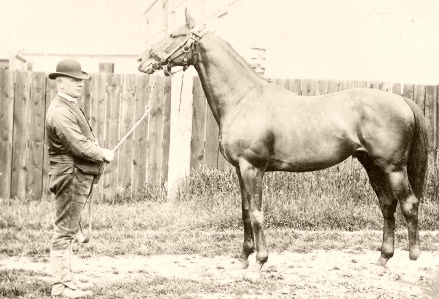
- Sire: Solon
- Grandsire: West Australian
- Dam: Ballyroe
- Damsire: Belladrum
- Sex: Stallion
- Foaled: 1878
- Country: United Kingdom
- Colour: Bay
- Owner: Robert Peck
- Trainer: 1. Tom Connolly 2. Martin Gurry
- Record: 13: 13-0-0

Barcaldine (1878) was an outstanding, undefeated British Thoroughbred racehorse and sire. He succeeded in carrying on the Matchem sire-line, which would have died out in Europe without his sons and grandsons. In the US, Matchem passed on his sire-line through Man o' War via the exported Australian.

== Pedigree ==
Barcaldine was inbred (2x3), being by Solon (by the Triple Crown winner West Australian from Darling's Dam). His dam, Ballyroe, was by Belladrum from Bon Accord by Adventurer from Darling's Dam.

== Racing record ==
=== Two-year-old season ===
Barcaldine had four starts for four wins as a two-year-old: in September the Railway Stakes at the Curragh Racecourse, the National Produce Stakes which he won by four lengths carrying 9 stone (126 pounds), the Beresford Stakes of one mile carrying 9½ stone (133 pounds) and the Paget Stakes of six furlongs, carrying 9 st 4 lb (130 pounds or 59 kg).

=== Three-year-old season ===
Only being half-fit, Barcaldine won Baldoyle Derby by a length in May. In June, he raced for three straight days in winning three Queen's Plates at the Curragh.

=== Four-year-old season ===
Stewards investigating Barcaldine's true ownership resulted in him being unraced that season. At the end of 1882, he was sold to his new trainer, Robert Peck.

=== Five-year-old season ===
Barcaldine next won the 1½ mile Westminster Cup, the 1½ mile Epsom Stakes, carrying 9 st 4 lb (130 pounds or 59 kg), the three-mile Orange Cup at Ascot, and finally the Northumberland Plate under 9 st 10 lb (136 pounds) by two lengths in a field of nine.

== Assessment ==
In May 1886, The Sporting Times carried out a poll of one hundred racing experts to create a ranking of the best British racehorses of the 19th century. Barcaldine was ranked fifteenth, having been placed in the top ten by twenty-one of the contributors.

== Stud record ==
Barcaldine was then sold to Lady Stamford for £8,000 and retired to stand at Park Paddocks, Newmarket, for a fee of 50 guineas. He produced the winners of 305 races in England, including:

- Barmecide (Goodwood Cup),
- Marco, was considered the best of his generation at age three and continued the Godolphin Arabian sire line.
- Mimi (Epsom Oaks, One Thousand Guineas),
- Morion (Ascot Gold Cup),
- Sir Visto (St Leger Stakes, Epsom Derby)
- Winkfield (Ascot Gold Cup)

Barcaldine was the great-grandsire of unbeaten Hurry On, who sired the Derby winner Captain Cuttle from the first mare he covered at stud and was the Leading sire in Great Britain & Ireland in 1926.

Exported Barcaldine daughters have influenced Thoroughbred breeding in Australia, the US, and South America.

Barcaldine stood at the same stud for nine years until his death from a liver abscess.

== Sire line tree ==
- Barcaldine
  - Winkfield
    - Winkfields Pride
      - Quo Vadis
      - Lorlot
      - Finasseur
      - Italus
    - Bachelors Button
  - Barmecide
  - Goodfellow
    - Chaleureux
  - Morion
  - Espoir
  - Wolfs Crag
    - Linacre
      - Mistico
      - Panacre
      - Lordacre
      - Tangalooma
  - Dumbarton
  - Marco
    - Mark Time
    - Sansovino
    - Beppo
      - Picaroon
    - Marcovil
      - My Prince
        - Easter Hero
        - Boyarin
        - Gregalach
        - Reynoldstown
        - Princelet
        - Royal Mail
        - Prince Regent
      - Hurry On
        - Captain Cuttle
        - Diligence
        - Hunting Song
        - Werwolf
        - Roger de Busli
        - Town Guard
        - Coronach
        - Nesiotes
        - Call Boy
        - Cyclonic
        - Defoe
        - Hunter's Moon
        - Excitement
        - Press Gang
        - Accelerator
        - Garryclogher
        - Precipitation
      - Milton
        - Poet Prince
    - Moscato
    - Bronzino
    - Neil Gow
      - Re-Echo
        - Payaso
    - Varco
      - Balboa
    - Ashore
    - Mark Minor
    - Omar Khayyam
      - Aga Kahn
      - Balko
      - Malicious
      - Mr Khayyam
    - Sprig
  - Sir Visto
  - The Rush
  - Prince Barcaldine

== See also ==
- List of leading Thoroughbred racehorses
