= Mimi (horse) =

British-bred Thoroughbred racehorse

- Sire: Barcaldine
- Grandsire: Solon
- Dam: Lord Lyon mare
- Damsire: Lord Lyon
- Sex: Mare
- Foaled: 1888
- Country: United Kingdom
- Colour: Brown
- Breeder: Sir Tatton Sykes, 5th Baronet
- Owner: Noel Fenwick
- Trainer: Mathew Dawson
- Record: 13: 8-1-1
- Earnings: £14,342

Major wins
- Clearwell Stakes (1890); 1000 Guineas (1891); Newmarket Stakes (1891); Oaks Stakes (1891)

Mimi (1888 – 1907) was a dual classic-winning British Thoroughbred racehorse and broodmare. As a two-year-old in 1890 she showed very promising form to win her first four starts but was well beaten when stepped up in class to contest the Middle Park Plate and the Dewhurst Plate. She established herself as the best filly of her generation in May 1891 with three wins in 26 days, taking the 1000 Guineas over one mile, the Newmarket Stakes over ten furlongs and the Oaks Stakes over 1 1/2 miles. She was subsequently beaten in the Prince of Wales Stakes at Leicester and was no match for Common in the St Leger. She was retired from racing at the end of the year and went on to have some success as a dam of winners.

== Background ==
Mimi was a brown mare bred by Tatton Sykes at his Sledmere Stud, near Driffield in Yorkshire. As a yearling she was consigned to the sales at Doncaster and was bought for 1000 guineas on behalf of Noel Fenwick. The filly was sent into training with the semi-retired veteran Mathew Dawson at his Melton House stable in Newmarket, Suffolk.

Mimi's sire was the undefeated Irish champion Barcaldine, a representative of the Godolphin Arabian sire line, who also sired the Epsom Derby winner Sir Visto and the influential sire Marco. Her dam, an unnamed mare sired by Lord Lyon, also produced Priestess, the dam of Nun Nicer.

== Racing career ==
=== 1890: two-year-old season ===
Mimi began her racing career with four consecutive wins. She took the Lavant Stakes at Goodwood Racecourse, the Zetland Stakes (not the current race of the same name) at Newmarket Racecourse and the Two-Year-Old Stakes at the latter track.

On 7 October, over six furlongs at Newmarket, Mimi won the Clearwell Stakes at odds of 1/8, beating the colt Woolthorpe (her only opponent) by three quarters of a length. On the following day over the same course and distance Mimi started at odds of 7/1 the Middle Park Plate, which was then the most prestigious two-year-old race of the season, and sustained her first defeat as she came home fifth behind the French-bred colt Gouverneur. At the next Newmarket meeting three weeks later she ran disappointingly when coming home last of five behind Lord Rosebery's filly Corstorphine (also trained by Dawson) in the seven furlong Dewhurst Plate, with press reports suggesting that she had failed to stay the longer distance. She ended the year with earnings of £1,887.

Fenwick put his filly up for auction at Newmarket in autumn, but she failed to reach her reserve price of 5,500 guineas.

=== 1891: three-year-old season ===
On 1 May, ridden by Fred Rickaby, Mimi was one of 12 fillies to contest the 78th running of the 1000 Guineas over the Rowley Mile course. She started the 7/1 third choice in the betting behind Siphonia (who had finished ahead of her when runner-up in both the Middle Park and the Dewhurst) and Lord Ellesmere's Belvidera. She had been available at 10/1 shortly before the race but her odds shortened after several large wagers were placed by her owner, Noel Fenwick. Mimi led from the start turned back a challenge from her stablemate Melody and won "easily" by 1 1/2 lengths, with Siphonia three lengths back in third place. Her winning time of 1:44.2 seconds was almost three seconds faster than that recorded by Common in the 2000 Guineas over the same course two days earlier.

Twelve days later Mimi was moved up in distance and matched against male opposition in the Newmarket Stakes over ten furlongs for which she started 9/2 second favourite behind the Duke of Westminster's highly regarded colt Orion. Melody set the pace with Mimi, ridden by John Watts settling in second place before going to the front in the last quarter mile. She won with "cleverly" by three quarters of a length from Melody with the colt St Simon of the Rock taking third ahead of Orion.

The 113th edition of the Oaks Stakes over 1 1/2 miles at Epsom Racecourse on 29 May attracted a field of six runners, but appeared to be effectively a match race between Mimi, the 4/7 favourite, and Corstorphine, who started at 7/2. With Rickaby again in the saddle, Mimi raced in third place behind Sabra and St Kilda before "sweeping" past to take the lead on the final turn. She drew away in the last quarter mile to win "in a canter" by four lengths from Corstorphine, with third place going to the 50/1 outsider Lady Primrose. As at Newmarket her winning time bettered that of Common in the colt's classic: the Oaks was won in 2:54.6 while the Derby Stakes took 2:56.8.

On her next appearance Mimi was made 4/7 favourite to win the £6,000 Prince of Wales Stakes over one mile at Leicester Racecourse on 9 July but ran "very slack" as she finished last of the six runners in a race won by the French colt Reverend. Noel Fenwick believed that his filly had been "got at" (deliberately injured or drugged) and the resulting argument over stable security saw him threaten to remove his horses from Dawson's yard. In September Mimi attempted to complete the Triple Crown when she took on colts in the St Leger over 14 1/2 furlongs at Doncaster Racecourse. She started 5/1 second favourite but after running well until the final turn she dropped rapidly from contention and came home fifth of the nine runners behind Common. The fact that Reverend finished second suggested that Mimi needed no excuses for her Leicester defeat. Two days later, over the same course and distance, Mimi was made 5/4 favourite for the Park Hill Stakes, an event which saw her conceding weight to her three opponents. She produced an improved effort without recovering her best form and finished a close third behind Cereza and Haute Saone. She ended her racing career with a minor victory at Newmarket in October.

Mimi earned £12,455 as a three-year-old.

== Breeding record ==
At the end of her racing career Mimi was bought back by Tatton Sykes and returned to her birthplace at Sledmere to become a broodmare. She produced at least twelve foals and several good winners between 1893 and 1907:

- Mimic, a bay colt, foaled in 1893, sired by Galopin. Winner.
- St Simonmimi, brown colt, 1894, by St Simon. Unraced.
- Simonsbath, bay colt (gelded), 1896, by St Simon
- Simile, bay colt, 1897, by St Simon
- St Maclou, bay colt, 1898, by St Simon. Won Lincolnshire Handicap.
- Royal Minister, bay colt, 1899, by Royal Hampton
- Mintagon, chestnut colt, 1901, by Martagon. Won Cesarewitch.
- Mimo, bay colt, 1902, by Isinglass
- Persimi, chestnut colt, 1904, Persimmon
- Unnamed filly, brown filly, 1905 St Frusquin. Exported to Belgium in 1908.
- Stymie, brown colt, 1906, by St Frusquin
- Unnamed filly, bay filly, 1907, by William the Third

Mimi died in 1907.

== Pedigree ==
Pedigree of Mimi (GB), brown mare, 1890
Sire Barcaldine (IRE) 1878	Solon; 1861	West Australian (GB)	Melbourne
Sire Barcaldine (IRE) 1878	Solon; 1861	West Australian (GB)	Mowerina
Sire Barcaldine (IRE) 1878	Solon; 1861	Birdcatcher mare	Birdcatcher
Sire Barcaldine (IRE) 1878	Solon; 1861	Birdcatcher mare	Hetman Platoff mare
Sire Barcaldine (IRE) 1878	Ballyroe; 1872	Belladrum (GB)	Stockwell
Sire Barcaldine (IRE) 1878	Ballyroe; 1872	Belladrum (GB)	Catherine Hayes
Sire Barcaldine (IRE) 1878	Ballyroe; 1872	Bon Accord	Adventurer (GB)
Sire Barcaldine (IRE) 1878	Ballyroe; 1872	Bon Accord	Birdcatcher mare
Dam Lord Lyon mare (GB) 1870	Lord Lyon; 1863	Stockwell	The Baron (IRE)
Dam Lord Lyon mare (GB) 1870	Lord Lyon; 1863	Stockwell	Pocahontas
Dam Lord Lyon mare (GB) 1870	Lord Lyon; 1863	Paradigm	Paragone
Dam Lord Lyon mare (GB) 1870	Lord Lyon; 1863	Paradigm	Ellen Horne
Dam Lord Lyon mare (GB) 1870	Sadie; 1858	Voltigeur	Voltaire
Dam Lord Lyon mare (GB) 1870	Sadie; 1858	Voltigeur	Martha Lynn
Dam Lord Lyon mare (GB) 1870	Sadie; 1858	Julia	Launcelot
Dam Lord Lyon mare (GB) 1870	Sadie; 1858	Julia	Miss Nancy (Family: 12-f)

- Mimi was inbred 3 × 4 to both Stockwell and the Birdcatcher mare, meaning that these horses in both the third and fourth generations of her pedigree.
