= Cyllene (horse) =

British-bred Thoroughbred racehorse

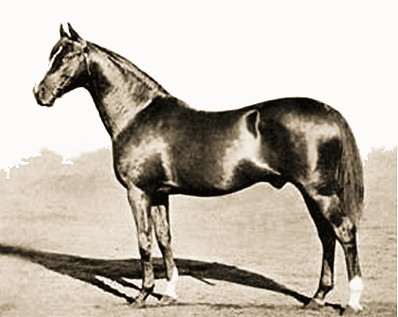
- Sire: Bona Vista
- Grandsire: Bend Or
- Dam: Arcadia
- Damsire: Isonomy
- Sex: Stallion
- Foaled: 24 May 1895
- Died: 1925 (aged 29–30)
- Country: United Kingdom of Great Britain and Ireland
- Colour: Chestnut
- Breeder: Charles Day Rose
- Owner: Charles Day Rose
- Trainer: William Jarvis
- Record: 11: 9–1–1

Major wins
- National Breeders' Produce Stakes (1897); Newmarket Stakes (1898); Jockey Club Stakes (1898); Ascot Gold Cup (1899)

Awards
- Leading sire in GB and Ireland (1909, 1910); Leading sire in Argentina (1913)
- Last updated on 13 November 2011

Cyllene (1895–1925) was a British Thoroughbred racehorse and sire. In a racing career that lasted from 1897 until 1899, Cyllene won nine of his eleven starts, winning major races and being regarded as the best horse of his generation at two, three and four years of age. In a stud career which began in Britain and ended in Argentina, Cyllene became an important and influential stallion. He sired four winners of The Derby and is the direct male-line ancestor of most modern thoroughbreds.

== Background ==
Cyllene, a chestnut horse with a white stripe and two white socks was bred by his owner, Charles Day Rose at the Hardwicke Stud near Pangbourne in Berkshire. He was a small, late foal, born in May and was never entered in the Classics as he was thought unlikely to be strong or mature enough to compete at the highest level at an early age. Cyllene was trained throughout his racing career by William Jarvis at Waterwitch House stable at Newmarket, Suffolk. Rose thought so highly of Cyllene that he arranged a "luxurious" private train to ensure that the colt returned to Newmarket promptly after his races. Cyllene's most regular rider was the 1899 Champion Jockey Sam Loates.

Cyllene's sire, Bona Vista was a high class racehorse who won the 2000 Guineas in 1892. He was considered a failure as a stallion and in the year of Cyllene's birth he was sold and exported to Hungary. Arcadia, Cyllene's dam, won two races and was a half sister to Van Dieman's Land, who ran third in the Derby.

== Racing career ==
=== 1897: two-year-old season ===
In the spring of 1897, Cyllene won small races at Liverpool and Gatwick "in good style". He was then sent to Ascot for the Triennial Stakes where he defeated Nun Nicer, a filly who won the following year's 1000 Guineas, establishing himself as one of the best of an apparently "above the average" generation. At Sandown in July he won the National Breeders' Produce Stakes by a head to take one of the season's most valuable two-year-old prizes, despite being unable to obtain a clear run until the closing stages.

After a break of three months he returned to the racecourse in October for the Imperial Produce Stakes at Kempton Park Racecourse in which he narrowly failed to give ten pounds to Dieudonne, a colt who went on to win the Middle Park Stakes later in the month.

=== 1898: three-year-old season ===
As he was ineligible to run in the Classics, Cyllene's three-year-old campaign was somewhat restricted. He was disappointing on his debut, finishing third at odds of 2/11 in the Column Produce Stakes at Newmarket in April but was never beaten again. In May he easily won the Newmarket Stakes by four lengths in record time, and was then rested until autumn. Before he returned, the form of his Newmarket win was boosted when Jeddah, who had finished fifth in the race, won The Derby.

In September he produced his best performance to date to win the Jockey Club Stakes at Newmarket by six lengths from a field which included Dieudonne and the Classic winners Airs and Graces and Chelandry. On his final start of the year he won the Sandown Park Foal Stakes by four lengths, taking his winnings for the season to £14,563.

=== 1899: four-year-old season ===
Cyllene's four-year-old season was compressed into a three-day period in June at Royal Ascot. At the start of the meeting he won the Triennial Stakes which served as a warm-up for the Ascot Gold Cup two days later. Racing over two and a half miles in the Gold Cup, Cyllene turned the race into a "procession", taking the lead two furlongs out and pulling clear to win by eight lengths from Lord Edward and the Prix du Jockey Club winner Gardefeu. According to one correspondent, Cyllene "simply played" with the top quality field, with his jockey Sam Loates having time to stroke the horse's neck and touch his cap to the cheering crowd in the closing stages.

The effects two races on firm ground meant that Cyllene's connections abandoned plans to run him for a third time at the meeting (in the Hardwicke Stakes) and the colt was given an extended rest. In autumn there was much anticipation of a meeting between Cyllene and the Triple Crown winner Flying Fox, with Charles Day Rose being reported as saying that he "looked forward to beating" the outstanding three-year-old in the Champion Stakes at Newmarket. When Cyllene returned to serious training however, it was decided that the risk of the horse breaking down was too great and he was retired to stud without racing again.

== Assessment ==
Assessing the two-year-olds of 1897, at least one correspondent believed that Cyllene was "on sheer merit" the best of a "pretty smart lot".

At the end of his three-year-old season there was little doubt that Cyllene was the best horse of his generation in England, with the only debate concerning the identity of the second best. An "English turf writer" confidently asserted that if Cyllene had been entered in the Classics he would have "swept the board" and been regarded as a "second Ormonde".

In June 1899, shortly before his runs at Royal Ascot, Cyllene was rated by the Daily Mail's correspondent as one of the three best horses in England, alongside the Australian-bred Newhaven and the three-year-old Flying Fox. At the end of the season another correspondent rated him the second best horse of the year behind Flying Fox.

== Stud career ==
=== England ===
Cyllene stood as a stallion at the Hardwicke Stud from 1900 until 1905. He was then sold for 30,000 gns to William Bass and was moved to the Egerton Park Stud at Newmarket where he was based until 1908. He was not a popular stallion at first, and attracted relatively few top class mares despite a modest stud fee of between 100 and 150 gns. Despite this he soon proved to be outstandingly successful, siring the Derby winners Cicero, Minoru, Tagalie and Lemberg. More important in the long term was Polymelus who sired three Derby winners (Fifinella, Pommern and Humorist) and Phalaris, the most influential sire of the 20th Century.

=== Argentina ===
In January 1908 Cyllene was sold for £25,000 to Haras Ojo de Agua in Argentina and was exported in July. After his departure Cyllene's progeny made him Leading sire in Great Britain and Ireland in both 1909 and 1910. In Argentina he was Champion sire in 1913 and got the winners of four Argentinian classics. Cyllene died at the age of thirty in 1925 and was buried at the Ojo de Agua cemetery.

== Pedigree ==
Pedigree of Cyllene (GB), chestnut stallion, 1895
Sire Bona Vista (GB) ch. 1889	Bend Or ch. 1877	Doncaster ch. 1870	Stockwell
Sire Bona Vista (GB) ch. 1889	Bend Or ch. 1877	Doncaster ch. 1870	Marigold
Sire Bona Vista (GB) ch. 1889	Bend Or ch. 1877	Rouge Rose ch. 1865	Thormanby
Sire Bona Vista (GB) ch. 1889	Bend Or ch. 1877	Rouge Rose ch. 1865	Ellen Horne
Sire Bona Vista (GB) ch. 1889	Vista b. 1879	Macaroni b. 1860	Sweetmeat
Sire Bona Vista (GB) ch. 1889	Vista b. 1879	Macaroni b. 1860	Jocose
Sire Bona Vista (GB) ch. 1889	Vista b. 1879	Verdure ch. 1867	King Tom
Sire Bona Vista (GB) ch. 1889	Vista b. 1879	Verdure ch. 1867	May Bloom
Dam Arcadia (GB) ch. 1887	Isonomy b. 1875	Sterling b. 1868	Oxford
Dam Arcadia (GB) ch. 1887	Isonomy b. 1875	Sterling b. 1868	Whisper
Dam Arcadia (GB) ch. 1887	Isonomy b. 1875	Isola Bella ch. 1868	Stockwell
Dam Arcadia (GB) ch. 1887	Isonomy b. 1875	Isola Bella ch. 1868	Isoline
Dam Arcadia (GB) ch. 1887	Distant Shore ch. 1880	Hermit ch. 1864	Newminster
Dam Arcadia (GB) ch. 1887	Distant Shore ch. 1880	Hermit ch. 1864	Seclusion
Dam Arcadia (GB) ch. 1887	Distant Shore ch. 1880	Lands End ch. 1873	Trumpeter
Dam Arcadia (GB) ch. 1887	Distant Shore ch. 1880	Lands End ch. 1873	Faraway (Family 9-e)

Note: b. = Bay, ch. = Chestnut
