= SS Takliwa =

Cargo liner, built 1924

History

United Kingdom
- Name: Takliwa
- Owner: British India Steam Navigation Company (1924-40); Ministry of War Transport (1940-45); Ministry of Transport (1945)
- Operator: British India Steam Navigation Company
- Port of registry: United Kingdom
- Route: Calcutta - Japan (1924-33); United Kingdom - Mombasa - Bombay (1933-40)
- Builder: Barclay, Curle & Co Ltd
- Yard number: 601
- Launched: 19 May 1924
- In service: July 1924
- Out of service: 15 October 1945
- Identification: United Kingdom Official Number 147665; Code Letters GKLB
- Fate: Wrecked, 16 October 1945

General characteristics
- Class & type: Cargo liner
- Tonnage: 7,936 GRT; 3,742 NRT; 8,200 DWT
- Length: 450 ft 7 in (137.34 m)
- Beam: 60 ft 2 in (18.34 m)
- Depth: 29 ft 2 in (8.89 m)
- Propulsion: 4-cylinder triple expansion steam engine driving twin screw propellers
- Speed: 16 knots (30 km/h)
- Capacity: 56 1st class, 80 2nd class and 3,302 deck class passengers.

Takliwa was a 7,936 GRT cargo liner that was built in 1924 by Barclay, Curle & Co Ltd, Glasgow, Scotland for the British India Steam Navigation Company. She was converted to a hospital ship during the Second World War, serving until she was wrecked in October 1945.

== Description ==
The ship was 450 feet 7 inches (137.34 m) long, with a beam of 60 feet 2 inches (18.34 m) and a depth of 29 feet 2 inches (8.89 m). She was assessed at 7,936 GRT, 3,742 NRT and 8,200 DWT. She had accommodation for 56 1st class, 80 2nd class and 3,302 deck class passengers.

The ship was propelled by a 1,376 nhp four-cylinder triple expansion steam engine, which had cylinders of 25 inches (64 cm), 42.5 inches (108 cm) and 51 inches (130 cm) diameter by 51 inches (130 cm) stroke. There were two low-pressure cylinders. The engine drove twin screw propellers. It could propel the ship at 16 knots (30 km/h).

== History ==
Takliwa was a cargo liner built by Barclay, Curle & Co Ltd, Glasgow for the British India Steam Navigation Co Ltd. Yard number 601, she was launched on 19 May 1924. She was allocated the United Kingdom Official Number 147685 and the Code Letters GKLB.

Takliwa was employed on the Calcutta, India - Japan service. In January 1927, she transported troops of the 2nd Battalion, The Durham Light Infantry to Calcutta and then to Hong Kong. The Chinese Civil War was then brewing, and the troops were taken on to Shanghai.

Takliwa served on the India–Japan route until 1933. She then served between the United Kingdom and Bombay, India via Mombasa, Kenya. Takliwa was in Bombay when the Second World War started. In 1940, she was requisitioned by the Ministry of War Transport for use as a troopship. Between September 1939 and July 1943, she sailed the Indian Ocean. From July 1943 to August 1944, Takliwa mostly sailed the Mediterranean. Takliwa was a member of Convoy KMS 31, which departed from Gibraltar on 10 November and arrived at Port Said, Egypt on 21 November. She joined the convoy at Oran, Algeria. On 11 November 1943, Takliwa was damaged in an attack on the convoy by Dornier Do 217 aircraft of Kampfgeschwader 100 and Heinkel He 111 & Junkers Ju 88 aircraft of Kampfgeschwader 26. She put into Algiers. In August 1944, she took part in Operation Dragoon, although it is not recorded how many troops she transported as a member of Convoy TF 1. Following Operation Dragoon, she continued sailing the Mediterranean until June 1945, when she returned to Bombay.

In 1945, she was converted to a hospital ship and assisted in the repatriation of prisoners of war from Hong Kong to India. She departed from Hong Kong on 5 October, on what was to be her final voyage. On 16 October, whilst repatriating ex-PoWs from Hong Kong to Madras, Takliwa ran aground at Indira Point, Great Nicobar, Indonesia and caught fire. A distress call was issued which was answered by HMS Sainfoin. All 1,083 people on board were rescued, as well as the ship's cat. Takliwa burnt out and broke up, a total loss.
