= Airs and Graces =

British-bred Thoroughbred racehorse

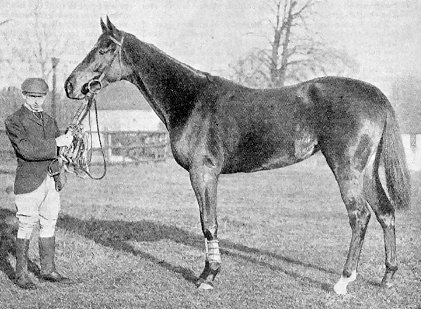
- Airs and Graces in 1899.
- Sire: Ayrshire
- Grandsire: Hampton
- Dam: Lady Alwyne
- Damsire: Camballo
- Sex: Mare
- Foaled: 1895
- Country: United Kingdom
- Colour: Bay
- Breeder: William Henry Fife-Cookson
- Owner: 6th Duke of Portland; W T Jones; Edmond Blanc
- Trainer: George Dawson; Fred Day
- Record: 14: 2-2-2

Major wins
- Oaks Stakes (1898)

Airs and Graces (1895 – 1915) was a British Thoroughbred racehorse and broodmare. As a two-year-old she raced in the colours of the 6th Duke of Portland and showed modest ability, winning one minor race. After being bought by the Australian sportsman W T Jones she showed much improved form at three in 1898, winning the Epsom Oaks and being placed in both the 1000 Guineas and the Coronation Stakes. She failed to win a race in 1900 but ran well to finish second in the Cambridgeshire Handicap. She was exported to France to become a broodmare and produced two top-class winners.

== Background ==
Airs and Graces was a "wiry, greyhoundy mare, with plenty of size and scope" bred in England by Captain (later Major) William Henry Fife-Cookson of Langton Hall in Yorkshire. As a yearling in July 1896 she was consigned to the sales at Newmarket and was bought for 550 guineas by the 6th Duke of Portland. She was sent into training with George Dawson at Heath House stable in Newmarket.

She was sired by Ayrshire who won the 2000 Guineas and Epsom Derby in 1888 and the Eclipse Stakes in 1889, before enjoying some success at stud, where his other foals included Bowling Brook and Our Lassie. Her dam Lady Alwyne failed to win in three starts and was described as "worthless as a racehorse".

== Racing career ==
=== 1897: two-year-old season ===
Airs and Graces ran five times as a two-year-old in 1897, recording her only success in the Hardwicke Stakes at Stockton Racecourse. In the Criterion Stakes over six furlongs at Newmarket on 26 October she finished fourth of the five runners behind the Duke of Westminster's colt Batt.

In December the filly, being held in no high regard by Dawson and having reportedly developed respiratory problems, was sold for 450 guineas to the Newmarket trainer Fred Day who was acting on behalf of the Australian W T Jones.

=== 1898: three-year-old season ===
On Friday 29 April 1898 Airs and Graces contested the 1000 Guineas over the Rowley Mile at Newmarket and started a 100/6 outsider. After tracking the leaders she moved up to dispute the lead in the last quarter mile but after going to the front she was overtaken and beaten a length by the favourite Nun Nicer.

Airs and Graces was moved up in distance to contest the 120th running of the Oaks Stakes at Epsom Racecourse on 27 May. Nun Nicer started favourite ahead of Ayah and Yester Year while Airs and Graces was fourth choice on 100/8 alongside Alt Mark (3rd in the 1000 Guineas). Ridden by Walter Bradford Airs and Graces raced just behind the leader before taking the lead at Tattenham corner. She quickly opened up a clear lead and was never seriously challenged, coming home three lengths clear of Nun Nicer. The filly's success earned her owner a reported £4,000 in winning bets. At Royal Ascot in June, Airs and Graces finished third to Lowood and Nun Nicer in the Coronation Stakes, conceding 13 pounds to the winner.

Airs and Graces returned at Newmarket in autumn when she was matched against older horses and male opposition in the £10,000 Jockey Club Stakes over ten furlongs. She ran fourth in a race which saw Cyllene win from Velasquez and Chelandry.

Her successes apparently led to at least one little girl in England being given the name "Airs and Graces" by her parents in 1898.

=== 1899: four-year-old season ===
Air and Graces remained in training in 1899 but failed to win any major races. At Ascot on 13 June she was assigned a weight of 118 pounds in the two-mile Ascot Stakes and finished unplaced behind Tom Cringle. Five weeks later she ran unplaced in the Chesterfield Cup over ten furlongs at Goodwood Racecourse. In the Cambridgeshire Handicap over nine furlongs at Newmarket on 26 October she carried 111 pounds and started at odds of 100/9 (11/1) in a twenty-five runner field. Ridden by the American jockey Lester Reiff she finished second, three lengths behind the three-year-old filly Irish Ivy but four lengths clear of the rest. She then started favourite for the Old Cambridgeshire Handicap at the same track but came home third behind Lexicon and Flambard. At Derby Racecourse on November 17 Airs and Graces ended her season by running unplaced under top weight of 122 pounds in the one and a half mile Derby Cup.

== Breeding record ==
At the end of her racing career Airs and Graces was sold to Edmond Blanc for 3,000 guineas and exported to become broodmare in France. Airs and Graces died in 1915. She produced at least six foals between 1902 and 1911:

- Jardy, a bay colt, foaled in 1902, sired by Flying Fox. Won Middle Park Stakes, second in the Epsom Derby.
- Myram, bay colt, 1904, by Flying Fox
- Fils du Vent, bay colt, 1906, by Flying Fox. Won Prix Robert Papin.
- Batailleur, bay colt, 1908, by Flying Fox
- Simplex, colt, 1910, by Ajax
- Viva, bay colt, 1911, by Flying Fox

== Pedigree ==
Pedigree of Airs and Graces (GB), brown mare, 1895
Sire Ayrshire (GB) 1885	Hampton; 1872	Lord Clifden	Newminster
Sire Ayrshire (GB) 1885	Hampton; 1872	Lord Clifden	The Slave
Sire Ayrshire (GB) 1885	Hampton; 1872	Lady Langden	Kettledrum
Sire Ayrshire (GB) 1885	Hampton; 1872	Lady Langden	Haricot
Sire Ayrshire (GB) 1885	Atalanta; 1878	Galopin	Vedette
Sire Ayrshire (GB) 1885	Atalanta; 1878	Galopin	Flying Duchess
Sire Ayrshire (GB) 1885	Atalanta; 1878	Feronia	Thormanby
Sire Ayrshire (GB) 1885	Atalanta; 1878	Feronia	Woodbine
Dam Lady Alwyne (GB) 1887	Camballo; 1872	Cambuscan	Newminster
Dam Lady Alwyne (GB) 1887	Camballo; 1872	Cambuscan	The Arrow
Dam Lady Alwyne (GB) 1887	Camballo; 1872	Little Lady	Orlando
Dam Lady Alwyne (GB) 1887	Camballo; 1872	Little Lady	Volley
Dam Lady Alwyne (GB) 1887	Florence Aislabie; 1865	Young Melbourne	Melbourne
Dam Lady Alwyne (GB) 1887	Florence Aislabie; 1865	Young Melbourne	Clarissa
Dam Lady Alwyne (GB) 1887	Florence Aislabie; 1865	Mary Aislabie	Malcolm
Dam Lady Alwyne (GB) 1887	Florence Aislabie; 1865	Mary Aislabie	Actaeon mare (Family: 5-f)

- Airs and Graces was inbred 4 × 4 to Newminster, meaning that this stallion appears twice in the fourth generations of her pedigree.
