= 1890 Grand National =

English steeplechase horse race

- Grand National
- Location: Aintree
- Date: 28 March 1890
- Winning horse: Ilex
- Starting price: 4/1 F
- Jockey: Arthur Nightingall
- Trainer: John Nightingall
- Owner: George Masterman
- Conditions: Soft

The 1890 Grand National was the 52nd renewal of the Grand National horse race that took place at Aintree near Liverpool, England, on 28 March 1890.

== Finishing Order ==
Position	Name	Jockey	Age	Handicap (st-lb)	SP	Distance
01	Ilex	Arthur Nightingall	6	10-5	4-1	12 Lengths
02	Pau	William Halsey	?	10-3	100-1	
03	M.P.	Mr William Moore	?	11-5	8-1	
04	Brunswick	George Mawson	?	10-4	100-1	
05	Why Not	Mr Charles Cunningham	?	12-5	100-9	
06	Emperor	Mr Dan Thirlwell	?	11-1	100-6	

== Non-finishers ==
Fence	Name	Jockey	Age	Handicap (st-lb)	SP	Fate
07	Frigate	Mr Tommy Beasley	?	12-7	100-7	Fell
10	Gamecock	Bill Dollery	?	12-6	20-1	Fell
07	Blood/Battle Royal	Mr Wildman	?	11-13	100-8	Fell
09	Bellona	Arthur Barker	?	11-9	11-2	Fell
26	Voluptuary	Tom Skelton	?	11-7	10-1	Fell
15	Braceborough	Mr FE Lawrence	?	10-13	100-1	Fell
21	Fetiche	V Baker	?	10-12	25-1	Fell
07	Hettie	Mr EP Wilson	?	10-11	25-1	Brought Down
07	Baccy	Mr William Woodland	?	10-8	100-1	Fell
25	Fireball	D Comer	?	10-4	100-1	Fell
