= Surefoot =

British-bred Thoroughbred racehorse

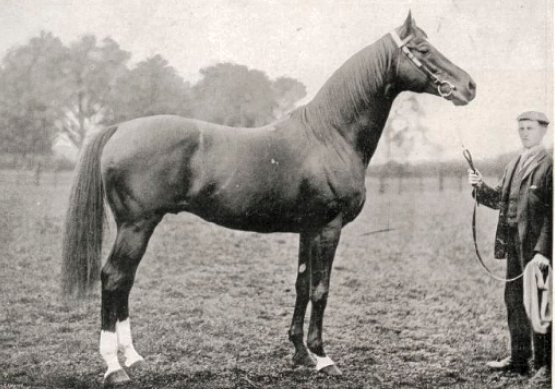
- Surefoot, c. 1899
- Sire: Wisdom
- Grandsire: Blinkhoolie
- Dam: Galopin mare
- Damsire: Galopin
- Sex: Stallion
- Foaled: 1887
- Country: United Kingdom
- Colour: Bay
- Breeder: A. W. "Archie" Merry
- Owner: A. W. "Archie" Merry
- Trainer: Charles Jousiffe; Garrett Moore
- Record: 15: 7-1-1
- Earnings: £26,808

Major wins
- Woodcote Stakes (1889); New Stakes (1889); 2000 Guineas (1890); Biennial Stakes (1890); Prince of Wales Stakes (Leicester) (1890); Eclipse Stakes (1891)

Surefoot (1887 – 1904) was a British Thoroughbred racehorse and sire whose exceptional racing ability was combined with a violent and unpredictable temperament. As a juvenile in 1889 he was regarded as the best colt of his generation in England after winning three of his four races including the Woodcote Stakes and New Stakes. He also demonstrated his precocity by reportedly siring a foal as a two-year-old. In 1890 he was an emphatic winner of the 2000 Guineas but despite being regarded as a near certainty for the Epsom Derby he finished fourth after spending much of the race attempting to savage other horses and jockeys. He went on to win a minor race at Royal Ascot and later defeated a strong field to take the valuable Prince of Wales' Stakes at Leicester Racecourse. As a four-year-old he showed little worthwhile form early in the season but returned to his best to win the Eclipse Stakes. After his retirement from racing he stood as a breeding stallion in England and France but had limited success as a sire of winners.

== Background ==
Surefoot was a "big, perfectly-formed" bay horse bred in England by his owner Mr A. W. "Archie" Merry, the son of James Merry. The colt was sent into training with Charles Jousiffe at Seven Barrows near Lambourn in Berkshire, where he was assigned to the box previously occupied by Bendigo. He was ridden in almost all of his races by the Edinburgh-born jockey John Liddiard.

His sire Wisdom, who died in 1893, was a failure as a racehorse but became a highly successful stallion, siring good horses such as Sir Hugo, Love Wisely (Ascot Gold Cup) and La Sagesse. Surefoot's dam, an unnamed mare by Galopin, was a granddaughter of the influential British broodmare Gossamer (foaled 1849).

== Racing career ==
=== 1889: two-year-old season ===
In 1888, the English sportsman Sir John Willoughby opened a book on the 1890 Epsom Derby and accepted a bet £100 on Surefoot at odds of 100/1 meaning that he stood to lose £10,000 if the colt won the race.

Surefoot recorded his first significant success on his racecourse debut in the Woodcote Stakes at the Derby meeting at Epsom Racecourse when he won by half a length from Heresy. At Royal Ascot in June he sustained his only defeat of the season in the Biennial Stakes when he was beaten a head after a "desperate" struggle with the filly Semolina. In the New Stakes two days later at the same meeting he was ridden by John Liddiard and won "easily" by a length from Heaume at odds of 5/4, After the race he was backed at odds of 6/1 for the following year's Epsom Derby. In the Findon Stakes over six furlongs at Goodwood Racecourse on 2 August Surefoot started at odds of 6/100 against two opponents and won "in a canter" by three lengths from the filly Red Thorn.

Despite failing to reappear after his Goodwood victory, Surefoot ended the year with earnings of £2,411 and headed the Derby betting on 4/1 with his nearest rivals being Le Nord (Dewhurst Stakes), Heaume (Challenge Stakes) and the filly Riviera (Champagne Stakes). He was described as the best two-year-old colt of the year although some doubts were expressed about his temperament and ability to withstand hard training.

It was later reported that at some point in 1889, Surefoot had broken his way into a paddock containing several broodmares and that at least one foal was born as a result of his escapade.

=== 1890: three-year-old season ===
==== Spring ====
Early in 1890 a visitor to Seven Barrows described the colt as "gross in constitution... lusty... clean in the pipes... [with] extraordinary muscular development" and "nearly the finest three-year-old I have ever looked over".

Surefoot began his second campaign when he was one of nine colts to contest the 82nd running of the 2000 Guineas over the Rowley Mile at Newmarket on 30 April. With Liddiard again in the saddle he was made the 5/4 favourite ahead of Le Nord (15/8) while the only other runners to start at less than 20/1 were the Duke of Portland's St Serf and the Duke of Westminster's Blue Green. Presumably on account of his nervous disposition he was saddled at the start rather than taking part in the mounted parade in front of the stands. Surefoot led from the start under strong restraint before Liddiard allowed him to stride out a furlong from the finish. He "romped" away from his opponents and won in the "easiest possible" style by a length and a half from Le Nord with five length back to Blue Green in third. After the race he still appeared full of energy and looked as though he had merely completed an exercise canter.

==== Summer ====
On 4 June at Epsom Racecourse Surefoot started the 40/95 favourite for the Derby Stakes with the best-fancied of his seven opponents being the John Porter-trained Sainfoin. The journey from Lambourn to Epsom had not been an easy one, with Surefoot's behaviour in the horsebox being likened to that of a Murcian Bull. When the contest began he raced in mid-division for most of the way in a slowly-run race and turned into the straight in fourth place. He made some progress under strong driving in the last quarter mile but became the shortest-priced beaten favourite in the race's history as he came home fourth behind Sainfoin, Le Nord and Orwell, beaten about a length by the winner. Surefoot had not improved his chances by his "demoniacal temper" and aggressive behaviour as he seemed more intent on attacking other horses than winning the race and at one point Liddiard had great difficulty preventing the colt from biting one of the other jockeys. After the race Archie Merry was seen "gesticulating wildly" at a visibly distressed Liddiard. Although there was some criticism of Liddiard for not taking the colt to front early in the race, other observers pointed out that Surefoot refused to co-operate with his jockey and blamed the owner and trainer for mollycoddling and "pampering" the horse, thus rendering him temperamentally ill-prepared for the occasion.

Surefoot ran three times at Royal Ascot later in June. He was equipped with blinkers for the Prince of Wales's Stakes over thirteen furlongs and started 5/4 favourite but after leading for most of the way he faded in the straight and finished fourth behind Alloway, Blue Green and Hebrides. On the following afternoon he won a Biennial Stakes over one mile against very moderate opposition. On the final day of the meeting two days later he faced a rematch with Sainfoin in the Hardwicke Stakes but neither proved any match for the four-year-old Amphion who won easily by a length from the Derby winner with Surefoot four lengths back in third.

On 9 July the colt was dropped back in distance for the £8,500 Prince of Wales Stakes over one mile at Leicester Racecourse and was made the 5/2 favourite in an eight-runner field which also included Memoir (winner of the Epsom Oaks), Oddfellow (third in the Grand Prix de Paris), Le Nord and Alloway. Despite showing his customary bad temper at the start, where he refused to line up with the other horses, Surefoot quickly took the lead and opened up a clear advantage. Memoir emerged as his only threat in the closing stages, but he shook off the filly's challenge and drew away to win by two lengths with a gap of five lengths back to Alloway in third.

==== Autumn ====
At Doncaster Racecourse on 10 September, Surefoot was stepped up in distance for the St Leger Stakes over 14 1/2 furlongs and started the 8/1 fourth choice in the betting. He was restrained towards the rear of the fifteen-runner field but lost any chance of winning when he was struck into from behind by St Serf and finished tenth behind Memoir. Surefoot ended his season in the Free Handicap over ten furlongs at Newmarket in October in which he carried joint top weight of 131 pounds and finished fourth behind St Serf (120 pounds), Martagon (106) and Blue Green (120) with Sainfoin (131) in fifth and last place

Surefoot ended the year with earnings of £12,722.

=== 1891: four-year-old season ===
Charles Jousiffe, who had been suffering from heart problem for several years, died in early 1891, and the training of Surefoot was taken over by Garrett Moore. The colt began his third campaign in the Great Jubilee Handicap over one mile at Kempton Park Racecourse on 9 May in which he carried top weight of 131pounds and started the 100/30 favourite. He finished unplaced behind the five-year-old Nunthorpe with his rapid retreat in the last three furlongs being ascribed to either "inability or bad temper". At Royal Ascot he was dropped back to sprint distances for the Queen's Stand Plate and finished down the field behind the two-year-old filly Lady Caroline.

At Sandown Park on 9 July, Surefoot, carrying 142 pounds, started at odds of 100/8 for the fourth running of the Eclipse Stakes over ten furlongs. The Derby winner Common started the odds-on favourite while the other seven runners included Memoir, Gouverneur (runner-up in the Derby), Le Nord and Alloway. Surefoot misbehaved as usual before and after the race, rearing up and "scattering the crowd in all directions". In the race he settled behind the leaders before moving up on the outside in the straight. A furlong out Common and Gouverneur were locked together and fighting out the finish when Liddiard unleashed Surefoot who produced a powerful late run. The older horse gained the advantage in the final strides and won by half a length and a short head from Gouverneur and Common. After Surefoot's victory it was reported that Merry intended to retire the horse to stud before his temper was "irretrievably ruined".

== Stud record ==
At the end of his racing career, Surefoot was retired to become a breeding stallion. In 1899 he was sold to Pierre d'Arenberg and exported to France, where he died in 1904.

The best of his offspring was probably Pinfold, a gelding who won the Doncaster Cup as a three-year-old in 1898.

== Pedigree ==
Pedigree of Surefoot (GB), bay stallion, 1887
Sire Wisdom (GB) 1873	Blinkhoolie; 1864	Rataplan	The Baron*
Sire Wisdom (GB) 1873	Blinkhoolie; 1864	Rataplan	Pocahontas*
Sire Wisdom (GB) 1873	Blinkhoolie; 1864	Queen Mary	Gladiator
Sire Wisdom (GB) 1873	Blinkhoolie; 1864	Queen Mary	Plenipotentiary mare
Sire Wisdom (GB) 1873	Aline; 1862	Stockwell	The Baron
Sire Wisdom (GB) 1873	Aline; 1862	Stockwell	Pocahontas*
Sire Wisdom (GB) 1873	Aline; 1862	Jeu d’Esprit	Flatcatcher
Sire Wisdom (GB) 1873	Aline; 1862	Jeu d’Esprit	Extempore
Dam Galopin mare (GB) 1884	Galopin; 1882	Vedette	Voltigeur
Dam Galopin mare (GB) 1884	Galopin; 1882	Vedette	Mrs Ridgway
Dam Galopin mare (GB) 1884	Galopin; 1882	Flying Duchess	The Flying Dutchman
Dam Galopin mare (GB) 1884	Galopin; 1882	Flying Duchess	Merope
Dam Galopin mare (GB) 1884	Miss Foote; 1866	Orlando	Touchstone
Dam Galopin mare (GB) 1884	Miss Foote; 1866	Orlando	Vulture
Dam Galopin mare (GB) 1884	Miss Foote; 1866	Gossamer	Birdcatcher (IRE)
Dam Galopin mare (GB) 1884	Miss Foote; 1866	Gossamer	Cast Steel (Family: 19-c)
