= 1890 Epsom Derby =

The 1890 Epsom Derby was a horse race which took place at Epsom Downs on 2 June 1890. It was the 110th running of the Derby, and it was won by Sainfoin. The winner was ridden by John Watts and trained by John Porter.

== Race details ==
- Prize money to winner: £5930
- Number of runners: 8
- Winner's time: 2m 49.8s

== Full result ==
	*	Horse	Jockey	Trainer	SP
1		Sainfoin	John Watts	John Porter	100/15
2	¾	Le Nord	Fred Barrett		100/7
3	neck	Orwell	George Barrett		100/1
4	hd	Surefoot	John Liddiard	Charles Jousiffe	40/95 fav
5		Martagon	John Osborne		100/1
6		Rathbeal	William Robinson		100/7
7		Kirkham	Fred Webb		50/1
8		Golden Gate	Tom Cannon, Jr.		50/1

* The distances between the horses are shown in lengths or shorter. shd = short-head; hd = head; PU = pulled up.

== Winner's details ==
Further details of the winner, Sainfoin:

- Foaled: 1887
- Sire: Springfield; Dam: Sanda (Wenlock)
- Owner: Sir James Miller
- Breeder: Hampton Court Stud
