= Visto (rapper) =

American singer-songwriter

- Also known as: Head Hippie
- Born: Travis Shelton; 23 February 1993 (age 33)
- Origin: Washington, D.C., United States
- Genres: Hip hop; Rap; R&B
- Occupations: Rapper; Singer; Songwriter
- Years active: 2014–present
- Website: vistohlk.com

Travis Shelton, better known by his stage name Visto or Head Hippie is an American rapper and singer-songwriter from Washington, D.C.

== Career ==
On August 20, 2013, Visto released his first album, Before Euphoria, which included two singles, "How That Pxssy Taste" with rapper Phil Da Phuture and "Fxcking Around". He continued to gain recognition for his science fictional visuals with his 2014 singles "Shinobi" and "On Fleek Tonight". On August 4, 2015, the singles "Smoke it Down", produced by The Democratz, and "Namaste", featuring Domani Harris and Australian songstress Emmaline, were released. "Namaste" was co-produced by DJ Money and Mister Neek in the Minsta Cinema visuals. In 2016, Visto collaborated with Dew Baby to produce his hit single "Bu$$in Sudz", while working on his own single "I'm Good". "I'm Good" was inspired by the results of the United States presidential election of 2016 and produced by The Democratz. In July 2016, Visto performed alongside artists Snoop Dogg and Wiz Khalifa at DOPE Fest. In April 2016, Visto shared the stage with fellow Hippie Life Krew member Pinky KillaCorn at Broccoli City Festival, featuring artists including Future and Jhene Aiko. In March 2016, Visto co-headlined WEDC's SXSW stage with Wale.

On March 21, 2017, Visto changed the life of a homeless artist, Carton Joyner, by organizing an exhibition for Carton and bringing him off the streets. In addition, Visto helped Carton raise thousands of dollars for his artwork by setting up Carton's social media accounts and GoFundMe.

On April 20, 2018, Visto released his long-awaited EP Dopacabana.

== Hippie Life Krew ==
In 2011, Visto founded Hippie Life Krew, a DMV-based music and lifestyle collective. Since then, Hippie Life Krew has performed with other artists including Snoop Dogg, Currency, Raheem DeVaughn, Wale and many more. In 2015, Hippie Life Krew began GiveBag, an ongoing community initiative that aims to provide winter clothing and hygiene items for the homeless. Hippie Life Krew also produces party and performance platforms such as Hippie Kabal, Free Spirits Sessions, and The Slow Burner.

== Discography ==
=== Music ===
Title	Details
Before Euphoria	Released: August 20, 2013; Label: Maniiifest/Defient; Songs: Before Euphoria (feat. Shari), Everything Gorgeous, Fxcking Around, Make You Move (feat. K Rucka & Fat Trel), One Night (feat. Kyonté & Black Cobain), Acapulco Gold (feat. Folkz & Nike Nando), How that Pxssy Taste (feat. Phil da Future), Witcha, Walkin Bakin (feat. Ste Fis Dope, Itz2 Eazy & Kaye Trill)
Witcha	Released: February 4, 2014; Label: G.Baker Presents, Llc
Shinobi	Released: June 7, 2014; Label: 368 Music Group
On Fleek Tonight	Released: December 9, 2014; Label: Maniiifest/Defient
Smoke It Down	Released: August 4, 2015; Label: Maniiifest/Defient
Dopacabana	Released: April 20, 2018; Label: Finally Forbes
