= Sam Loates =

British jockey (1865–1932)

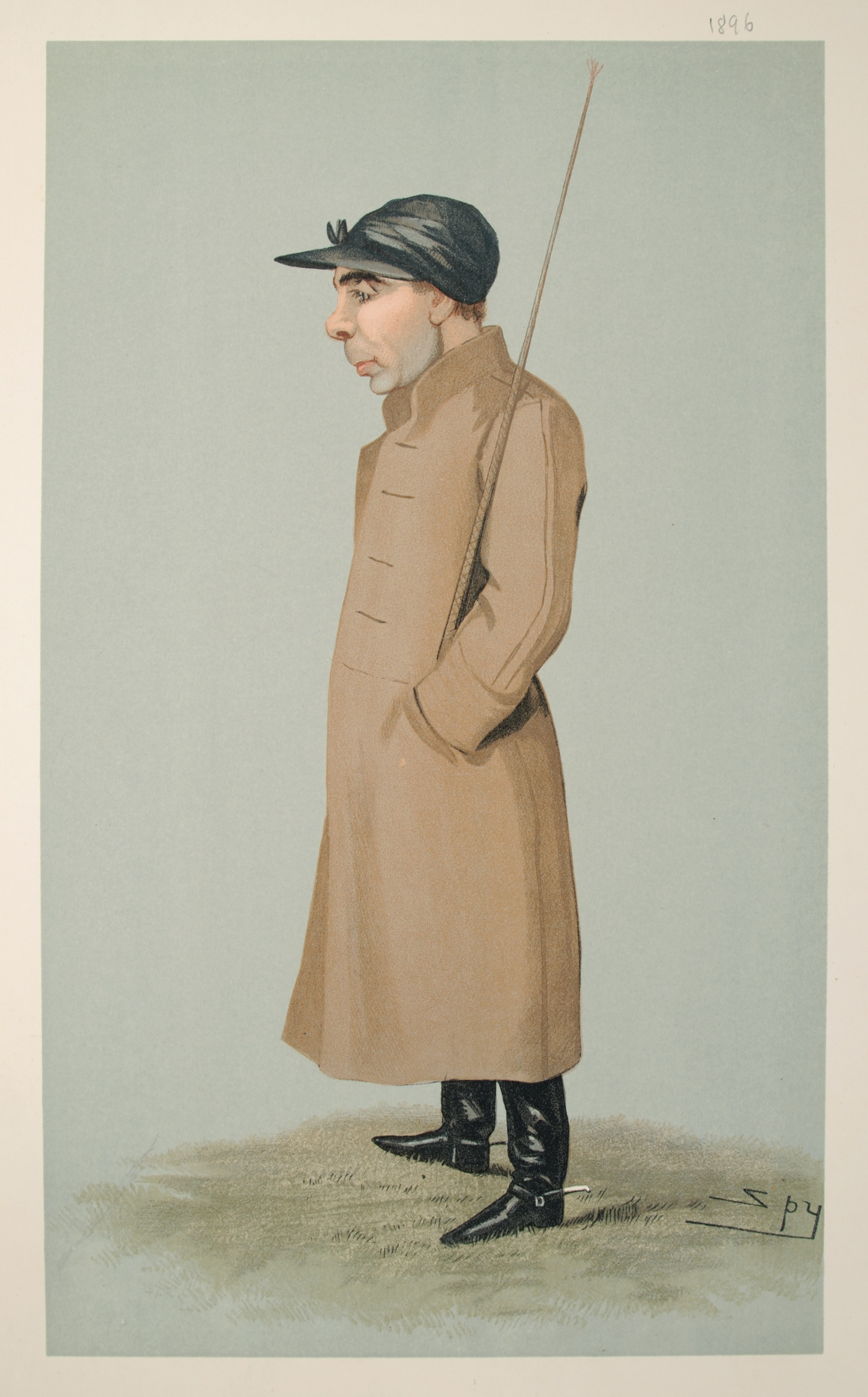
- Caricature of Sam Loates in Vanity Fair, 5 November 1896

Personal information
- Born: 1865
- Died: 1932 (aged 66–67)
- Occupation: Jockey

Horse racing career
- Sport: Horse racing

Major racing wins
- British Classic Race wins as jockey: 1,000 Guineas (1898, 1900); 2000 Guineas (1898); Epsom Oaks (1895); Epsom Derby (1884, 1895); St Leger Stakes (1895)

Racing awards
- British flat racing Champion Jockey (1899)

Significant horses
- Cyllene, Sir Visto

Samuel Loates (1865–1932) was a British thoroughbred horse racing jockey who was the Champion Jockey of 1899 in his home country.

== Background ==
Loates was from a racing family. He and three brothers were active as jockeys before and around the turn of the 20th century. The best known of his siblings was Tommy, who was one of Sam's predecessors as Champion Jockey.

== Riding career ==
A "small, short-legged and lightweight" jockey, Loates served his apprenticeship under Tom Cannon of Danebury, Wiltshire, who was as noted for his training of riders as for his training of horses. Loates rode his first winner at 17 years old and at 19, rode the first of two Derby winners, Harvester. In 1898, completed a hat-trick of Classics, doing the Derby-St. Leger double on Sir Visto and taking the Oaks on La Sagesse. There were no more Classic winners until 1898, when he did the Guineas double with Nun Nicer (1,000 Guineas) and Disraeli (2,000 Guineas).

In 1899, there was an invasion of American jockeys into British racing. Despite the extra competition, he won his one and only championship with 160 winners.

As the nation's leading jockey, on 28 October 1899 he entered into a lucrative agreement with Sir John Blundell Maple to be his retained jockey for three years. The fee for this deal was to be £2,000 p.a., plus travel expenses, plus £25 for each winner he rode. For the first two years, the relationship proceeded very amicably. In 1902, Loates rode the winners of over £20,000 in prize money.

But on 14 November 1902, at Northampton, Loates broke his thigh, with the effect that he couldn't take up his licence for the following season. Even though Loates finally obtained a licence in April, Blundell Maple took the initial denial of a licence by stewards on physical grounds as reason for terminating their agreement. Loates objected and took the case to court. Ultimately, the judge ruled that Loates was entitled to his retainer for 1902, but the relationship had been soured.

== Later life ==
Like many jockeys, he became a trainer on retirement. He trained for Solomon Joel and for a time was in charge of Derby winner Pommern.

== Major Wins ==
(United Kingdom) Great Britain

=== Classic Races ===
- 1,000 Guineas – (2) – Nun Nicer (1898), Winifreda (1900)
- 2,000 Guineas – Disraeli (1898)
- Derby – (2) – Harvester (1884), Sir Visto (1895)
- Oaks – La Sagesse (1895)
- St. Leger – Sir Visto (1895)

=== Selected other races ===
- Ascot Gold Cup – (1899)
- Jockey Club Stakes – (1898)
