= Memoir (horse) =

British-bred Thoroughbred racehorse

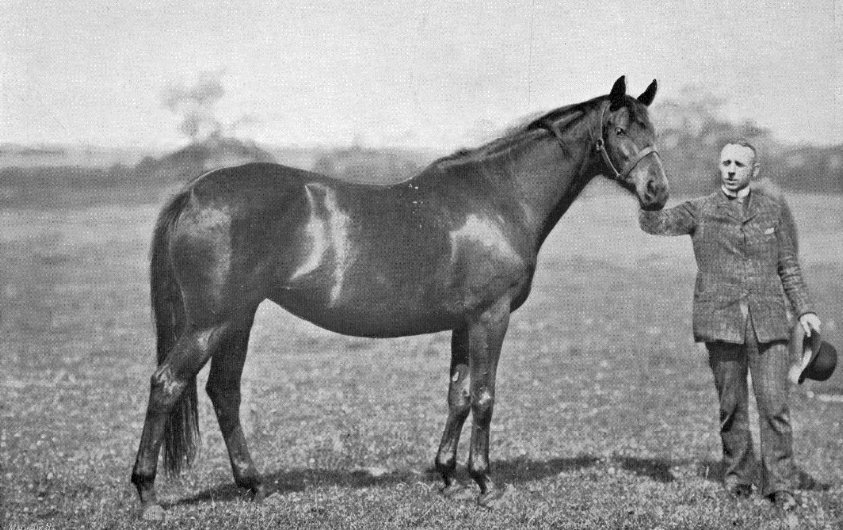
- Memoir in the Welbeck Stud, c. 1897.
- Sire: St Simon
- Grandsire: Galopin
- Dam: Quiver
- Damsire: Toxophilite
- Sex: Mare
- Foaled: 1887
- Country: United Kingdom
- Colour: Brown
- Breeder: National Stud
- Owner: William Cavendish-Bentinck, 6th Duke of Portland
- Trainer: George Dawson
- Record: 21: 8-3-0
- Earnings: £17,010

Major wins
- Prendergast Stakes (1889); Newmarket Stakes (1890); Oaks Stakes (1890); Nassau Stakes (1890); St Leger (1890); Newmarket Oaks (1890); July Cup (1891)

Memoir (1887 – 1908) was a dual classic-winning British Thoroughbred racehorse and broodmare. As a two-year-old in 1889 she showed considerable promise as she won the last three of her six races. In the following spring she appeared an unfortunate loser when stable arrangements prevented her from beating Semolina in the 1000 Guineas but she went on to win the Newmarket Stakes, Oaks Stakes, Nassau Stakes, St Leger and Newmarket Oaks. She added a win in the July Cup before being retired at the end of 1891. Although she produced no major winners, she had an enduring influence through her daughter, Miss Gunning.

== Background ==
Memoir was a brown mare bred in England by the National Stud. As a yearling she was put up for auction and bought for 1,500 guineas by William Cavendish-Bentinck, 6th Duke of Portland. She was sent into training with the Duke's private trainer George Dawson at the Heath House stable in Newmarket, Suffolk.

She was from the first crop of foals sired by the undefeated racehorse St Simon who went on to win nine sires’ championships. Her dam, Quiver produced Memoir full-sister La Fleche, as well as the influential broodmares Maid Marian and Satchel.

== Racing career ==
=== 1889: two-year-old season ===
Memoir ran six times as a juvenile in 1889 and was beaten on her first three starts before recording her first success when she won the Bradford Plate, worth £436 at Leicester Racecourse in September. At Newmarket Racecourse in October she added victories in the Zetland Stakes (not the current race of the same name) and the Prendergast Stakes. She ended the season with earnings of £1,308.

=== 1890: three-year-old season ===
==== Spring ====
In the 1000 Guineas over the Rowley Mile at Newmarket on 2 May Memoir started the 10/1 second choice in the betting behind Semolina, the 1/2 favourite, who was also owned by the Duke of Portland and trained by Dawson. Ridden by George Barrett Memoir finished second of the ten runners, beaten three quarters of a length by her more fancied stablemate. In accordance with the rules at the time, the Duke had "declared to win" with Semolina, and Memoir, who appeared to be capable of winning the race, was eased down in the closing stages, thus forfeiting her chance of victory. According to some reports Memoir was "fighting for her head" throughout the race and Barrett had to pull hard on the bridle to prevent her from winning.

At the next Newmarket meeting on 21 May, Memoir was moved up in distance and matched against male opposition in the Newmarket Stakes over ten furlongs for which he started the 6/1 second favourite behind Leopold de Rothschild's colt Le Nord. She was equipped with blinkers for the first time and after disputing the lead from the start she stayed on strongly to win by a short head from Blue Green with Le Nord in third.

==== Summer ====
On 6 June Memoir, with John Watts in the saddle, was one of seven fillies to contest the 112th running of the Oaks Stakes over one and a half miles at Epsom Racecourse. The Middle Park Plate winner Signorina started even money favourite ahead of Memoir (100/30) and Semolina, while the only one of the other four to be given any chance was Ponza (100/8). Memoir was restrained towards the rear as Semolina set the early pace, but made steady progress from half way and moved into contention in the straight. She took the lead entering the final furlong and defeated Signorina to win by three quarters of a length with Ponza taking third place ahead of Semolina. Her winning time of 2:40.8 was a new record for the race.

At Leicester on 9 July Memoir contested the £8,500 Prince of Wales Stakes over one mile and finished second behind the 2000 Guineas winner Surefoot. On 1 August she turned to all female competition in the Nassau Stakes over one mile at Goodwood Racecourse and won from Star and Dearest in a time of 1:49.6.

==== Autumn ====
The 115th edition of the St Leger, on 10 September over fourteen and a half furlongs at Doncaster Racecourse attracted a field of fifteen and saw Memoir start at odds of 10/1. She had been one of the favourites before her preparation was interrupted by a minor injury sustained in a training gallop. Heaume, the winner of the Poule d'Essai des Poulains and Prix du Jockey Club started favourite ahead of Sainfoin while the other fancied horses included Surefoot, Queen's Birthday (Great Yorkshire Stakes), Blue Green and St Serf (Sussex Stakes). The race took place in fine, breezy weather and attracted a crowd of approximately 100,000 including the Prince of Wales. Memoir was not among the early leaders as the outsiders Orwell and Oddfellow set the pace but moved into contention approaching the final turn. She entered the straight in third place behind Sainfoin and Heaume before moving up on the outside to take the lead on the outside approaching the final furlong. Amid "loud and continued cheering" she drew away in the closing stages to win by two lengths from Blue Green with third place going to the 200/1 outsider Gonsalvo.

Ten days after her win at Doncaster, Memoir was dropped back sharply in distance for the £11,000 Lancashire Plate over seven furlongs at Manchester Racecourse. Starting at odds of 11/4 and carrying 135 pounds she finished fifth of the nine runners behind the four-year-old Amphion. At Newmarket in October she again proved no match for Amphion, finishing second to the older horse in the Champion Stakes with Blue Green in third. On her final appearance of the year she won the Newmarket Oaks.

Memoir's winnings for the year came to £15,702.

=== 1891: four-year-old season ===
Memoir remained in training as a four-year-old but became increasingly difficult to manage and seemed unlikely to return to the track. Despite the negative prognostications Memoir won the July Cup over six furlongs at Newmarket at odds of 3/1 beating the specialist sprinter Noble Chieftain by a short head. She then started second favourite for the Eclipse Stakes at Sandown Park on 10 July but finished sixth behind Surefoot. In the Goodwood Cup over two and a half miles on 30 July, Memoir finished fourth of the five runners behind Gonsalvo under top weight of 133 pounds. She was beaten in her three other races that year.

== Breeding record ==
At the end of her racing career Memoir was retired to become a broodmare for the Duke of Portland's stud. She produced at least eight foals between 1893 and 1905:

- Golden Moments, a brown filly, foaled in 1893, sired by Sheen.
- Miss Gunning, brown filly, 1897, by Carbine. A very influential broodmare whose descendants have included Udaipur, Palestine and Wajima.
- Mannlicher, brown colt, 1898, by Carbine
- Brauneberg, brown colt (later gelded), 1900, by Ladas.
- The Scribe, bay colt, 1901, by Isinglass. Winner.
- Tom Boyce, bay colt, 1902, by Melton
- Quair, bay filly, 1903, by Orme
- Panegyric, bay colt, 1905, by Orme.

Memoir died at the Egerton Stud in 1908 from a rupture of the uterus.

== Pedigree ==
Pedigree of Memoir (GB), brown mare, 1887
Sire St. Simon (GB) 1881	Galopin; 1872	Vedette	Voltigeur
Sire St. Simon (GB) 1881	Galopin; 1872	Vedette	Mrs Ridgway
Sire St. Simon (GB) 1881	Galopin; 1872	Flying Duchess	The Flying Dutchman
Sire St. Simon (GB) 1881	Galopin; 1872	Flying Duchess	Merope
Sire St. Simon (GB) 1881	St. Angela; 1865	King Tom	Harkaway
Sire St. Simon (GB) 1881	St. Angela; 1865	King Tom	Pocahontas
Sire St. Simon (GB) 1881	St. Angela; 1865	Adeline	Ion
Sire St. Simon (GB) 1881	St. Angela; 1865	Adeline	Little Fairy
Dam Quiver (GB) 1872	Toxophilite; 1855	Longbow	Ithuriel
Dam Quiver (GB) 1872	Toxophilite; 1855	Longbow	Miss Bowe
Dam Quiver (GB) 1872	Toxophilite; 1855	Legerdemain	Pantaloon
Dam Quiver (GB) 1872	Toxophilite; 1855	Legerdemain	Decoy
Dam Quiver (GB) 1872	Young Melbourne mare 1861	Young Melbourne	Melbourne
Dam Quiver (GB) 1872	Young Melbourne mare 1861	Young Melbourne	Clarissa
Dam Quiver (GB) 1872	Young Melbourne mare 1861	Brown Bess	Camel
Dam Quiver (GB) 1872	Young Melbourne mare 1861	Brown Bess	Miss Nancy (Family: 3-e)
