= The Derby (1895 film) =

1895 British film by Birt Acres

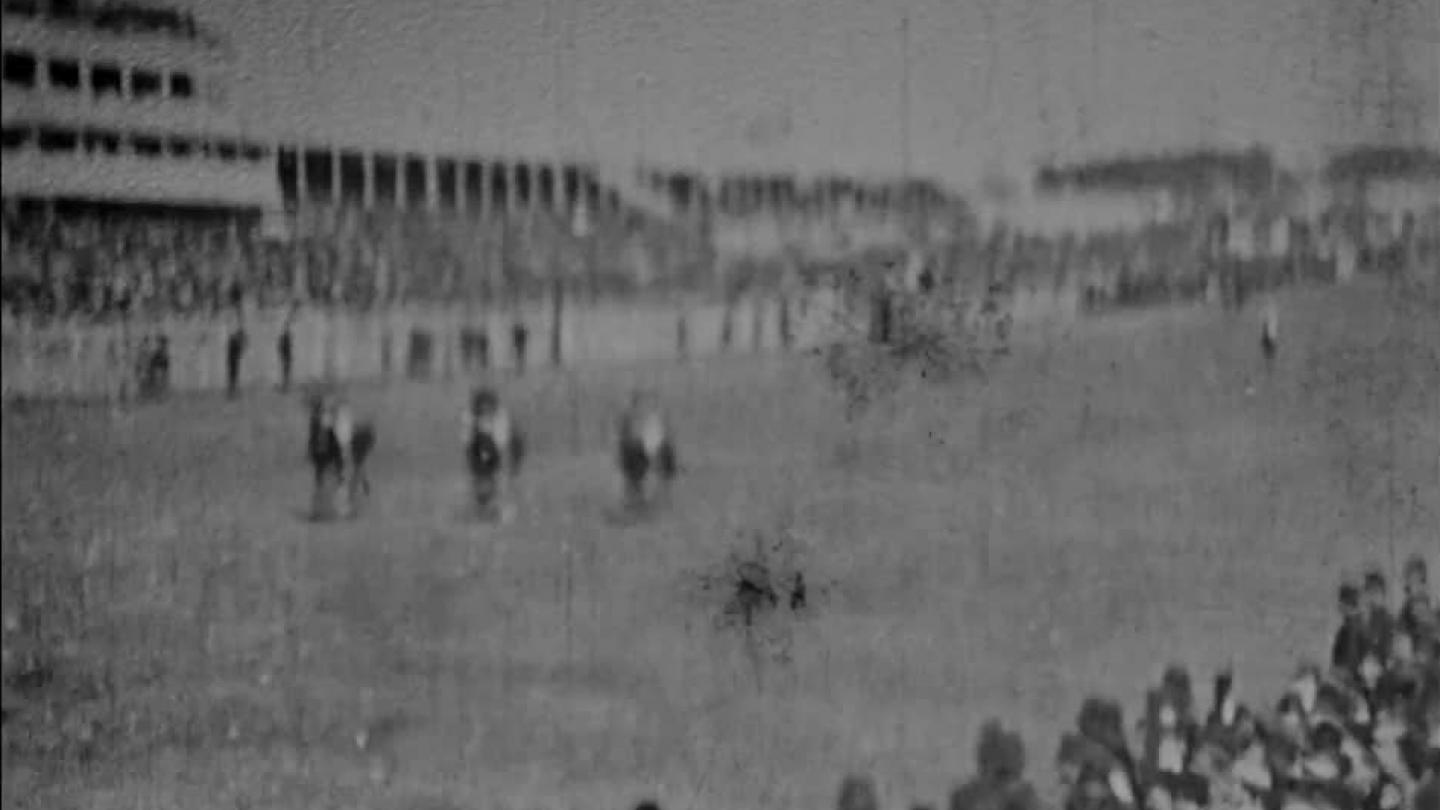
- Directed by: Birt Acres
- Produced by: Birt Acres
- Release date: 1895
- Running time: 44 seconds
- Country: United Kingdom
- Language: Silent

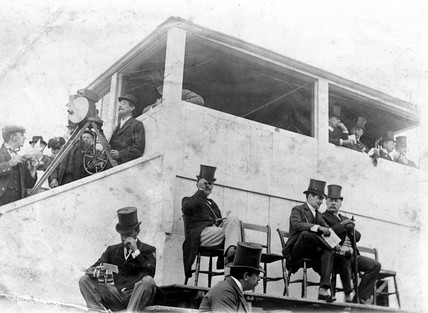
Birt Acres filming the Derby horse race at Epsom in 1895

The Derby is an 1895 British short black-and-white silent documentary film, produced and directed by Birt Acres for exhibition on Robert W. Paul's Kinetoscopes, featuring the end of the 29 May 1895 Epsom Derby viewed from a raised position close to the finishing line with the main stand in the distance. A photograph of Acres filming the documentary has survived, which shows that the camera used in the production was relatively portable. The film was long considered lost but footage discovered in the Ray Henville collection in 1995 has been identified by the BFI as being from this film.

== Synopsis ==
A stationary camera looks diagonally across a racetrack toward the infield showing the horses as they pass. Once the horses have passed the camera it is clear that the race has come to an end and there is a close finish between three horses. Once the race is over police officers run onto the field. The camera also displays various members of the audience moving around.

== Current status ==
Often confused with a film of the 1896 Derby shot by Robert Paul, the 1895 film is now freely available to viewers in the UK in a digital restoration on the BFI Player.

== See also ==
- List of films about horses
- List of films about horse racing
