= Semolina (horse) =

British-bred Thoroughbred racehorse

- Sire: St Simon
- Grandsire: Galopin
- Dam: Mowerina
- Damsire: Scottish Chief
- Sex: Mare
- Foaled: 1887
- Country: United Kingdom
- Colour: Bay
- Breeder: William Cavendish-Bentinck, 6th Duke of Portland
- Owner: Duke of Portland
- Trainer: George Dawson
- Record: 20: 14-0-2

Major wins
- Brocklesby Stakes (1889); Biennial Stakes (1889); 1000 Guineas (1890)

Semolina (1887 – 1909) was a British Thoroughbred racehorse and broodmare. Bred and owned by the 6th Duke of Portland, she was one of the best two-year-olds in England in 1889 when she won thirteen times from fifteen races. In the following spring she recorded her biggest success when she won the 1000 Guineas. She went on to run fourth in the Oaks Stakes and third in the Coronation Stakes, but never won again and was retired from racing at the end of the year. She had modest success as a dam of winners.

== Background ==
Semolina was a small bay mare, standing barely 15 hands high bred in England by her owner William Cavendish-Bentinck, 6th Duke of Portland. She was sent into training with the Duke's private trainer George Dawson at the Heath House stable in Newmarket, Suffolk.

She was from the first crop of foals sired by the undefeated racehorse St Simon who went on to win nine sires’ championships. Mowerina, Semolina's dam, won sixteen races and produced several winners including the Epsom Derby winner Donovan and Raeburn, the only horse ever to defeat Isinglass.

== Racing career ==
=== 1889: two-year-old season ===
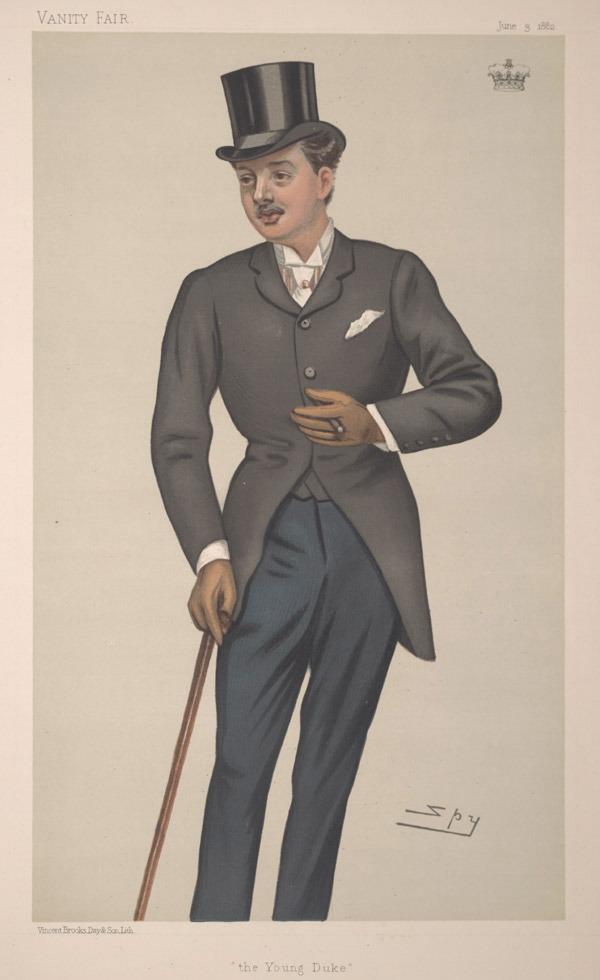
6th Duke of Portland, Semolina's owner and breeder

Semolina began her racing career on 28 March when she started at odds of 3/1 in a fourteen-runner field for the Brocklesby Stakes over five furlongs at Lincoln Racecourse and won by a length from a colt named Lactantius. At Newmarket Racecourse a month later she "cantered" to victory in the First Spring Two-Year-Old Stakes, and went on to take the Exning Stakes at the same track despite carrying a ten-pound weight penalty. In the May Plate at Windsor Racecourse the filly started at odds of 1/2 and won easily from Rotten Row and three others.

After winning the Acorn Stakes at Epsom Racecourse, Semolina was sent to Royal Ascot in June where she was matched against the highly regarded colt Surefoot in the Biennial Stakes. She was described as looking like a "small black rat" alongside the big, handsome colt but after leading from the start she got the better of a "desperate" struggle to win by a short head. The filly went on to record two victories at Stockbridge Racecourse's Bibury Club meeting, namely the Home-Bred Foal Stakes, which she won "readily" from three opponents, and the Stockbridge Post Stakes. On 18 July at Leicester Racecourse Semolina started 4/6 favourite for the £6,000 Portland Stakes but sustained her first defeat as she finished fifth behind the filly Riviera after fading badly in the final furlong. At Goodwood Racecourse Semolina returned to winning form as she "ran away" with the Prince of Wales' Stakes.

In autumn Semolina was scheduled to run a match race against Lord Zetland's colt Fontainebleau and collected a £100 forfeit when her opponent failed to appear. At Newmarket's "October" meetings Semolina won the Municipal Stakes, Boscawen Stakes and the Free Handicap. On her final run of the year she ran in the six-furlong Middle Park Stakes but made little impact and finished unplaced behind the Duke of Portland's other filly Signorina.

Semolina ended the season with a record of thirteen wins from fifteen starts and her earnings of £9,285 helped the Duke of Portland to claim the title of British flat racing Champion Owner for 1889 although her heavy schedule led to accusations that the Duke was "running horses off their legs".

=== 1890: three-year-old season ===
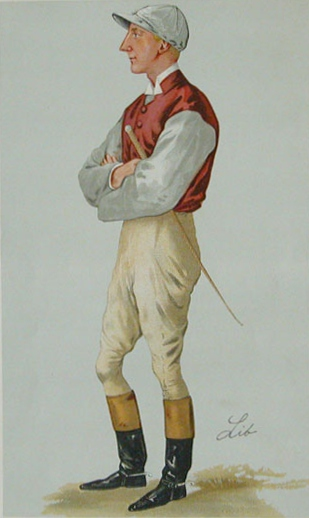
John Watts, who rode Semolina to victory in the 1000 Guineas

On 2 May 1890, Semolina, ridden by John Watts, was one of ten fillies to contest the 77th running of the 1000 Guineas over the Rowley Mile at Newmarket. At the time, an owner with more than one runner in the race was allowed to "declare to win" with one of their representatives. This meant that other horses in the same ownership could be held back to finish behind the declared horse, allowing the entry to run as a team as well as clarifying the likely result for the betting public. The Duke of Portland declared to win with Semolina, who thus went off the 1/2 favourite while her promising stablemate Memoir went off the 10/1 second choice. Semolina took the lead from start and as she approached the last quarter mile she had most of her opponents struggling although Memoir still looked to be going very well. She kept on well to win by three quarters of a length from Memoir, with one and a half length back to Fatuite in third place. The runner-up's jockey George Barrett appeared some difficulty preventing his filly from winning the race but did nothing wrong according to the "declare to win" rule.

In the Oaks Stakes on 6 June Semolina was stepped up in distance to one and a half miles and started the 4/1 third choice in the betting behind Signorina and Memoir. On this occasion did not declare to win with either of his fillies, meaning that they were expected to run on their individual merits. Ridden by Fred Barrett, Semolina took an early lead and set a very strong pace before tiring in the straight and finishing fourth of the seven runners behind Memoir, Signorina and Ponza. At least on correspondent claimed that Semolina had effectively been sacrificed and run as a pacemaker to secure the victory of her stablemate. Semolina was dropped back in distance for the Coronation Stakes at Royal Ascot and in a very close contest she finished third behind Heresy and Floranthe, to whom she was conceding seven and fourteen pounds respectively. In September Semolina started favourite for the Park Hill Stakes at Doncaster Racecourse but faded badly in the closing stages and came home last of the three runners behind Ponza and Star. At Newmarket in October she was dropped back to sprint distances for the Great Eastern Railway Handicap but finished unplaced under a weight of 108 pounds.

== Breeding record ==
After her retirement from racing Semolina became a broodmare for the Duke of Portland's stud. She produced five foals and one good winner between 1896 and 1902. She produced no living foals after 1902 and died in 1909. Her produce includes:

- Arrowroot, a bay filly, foaled in 1896, sired by Morion
- Three-O-Three (AKA .303), bay filly, 1897, by Carbine
- Sir Edgar, bay colt, 1898, by Kendal. Won Dee Stakes
- Warsop, filly, 1899, by Carbine
- Hasty, chestnut filly, 1902, by Isinglass. Female-line ancestor of Royal Gait, Overdose, Al Hattab (Haskell Invitational) and Gladness (Ascot Gold Cup).

== Pedigree ==
Pedigree of Semolina (GB), bay mare, 1887
Sire St Simon (GB) 1881	Galopin; 1872	Vedette	Voltigeur
Sire St Simon (GB) 1881	Galopin; 1872	Vedette	Mrs Ridgway
Sire St Simon (GB) 1881	Galopin; 1872	Flying Duchess	The Flying Dutchman
Sire St Simon (GB) 1881	Galopin; 1872	Flying Duchess	Merope
Sire St Simon (GB) 1881	St Angela; 1865	King Tom	Harkaway (IRE)
Sire St Simon (GB) 1881	St Angela; 1865	King Tom	Pocahontas
Sire St Simon (GB) 1881	St Angela; 1865	Adeline	Ion
Sire St Simon (GB) 1881	St Angela; 1865	Adeline	Little Fairy
Dam Mowerina (DEN) 1876	Scottish Chief (GB); 1861	Lord of the Isles	Touchstone
Dam Mowerina (DEN) 1876	Scottish Chief (GB); 1861	Lord of the Isles	Fair Helen
Dam Mowerina (DEN) 1876	Scottish Chief (GB); 1861	Miss Ann	The Little Known
Dam Mowerina (DEN) 1876	Scottish Chief (GB); 1861	Miss Ann	Bay Missy
Dam Mowerina (DEN) 1876	Stockings (GB); 1863	Stockwell	The Baron (IRE)
Dam Mowerina (DEN) 1876	Stockings (GB); 1863	Stockwell	Pocahontas
Dam Mowerina (DEN) 1876	Stockings (GB); 1863	Go-Ahead	Melbourne
Dam Mowerina (DEN) 1876	Stockings (GB); 1863	Go-Ahead	Mowerina (Family: 7-a)
