= Sir Visto =

British-bred Thoroughbred racehorse

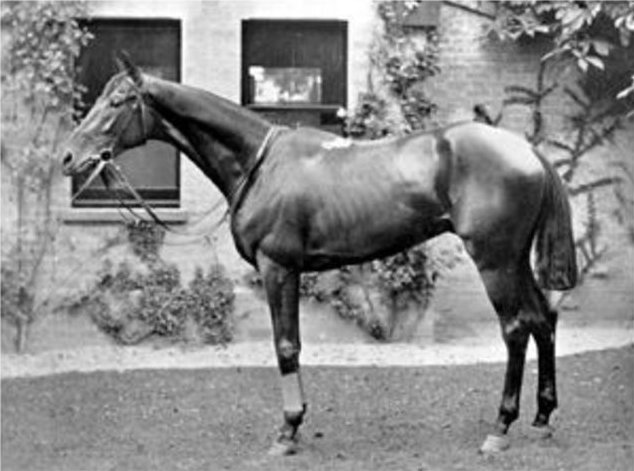
- Sir Visto as photographed by Clarence Hailey.
- Sire: Barcaldine
- Grandsire: Solon
- Dam: Vista
- Damsire: Macaroni
- Sex: Stallion
- Foaled: 1892
- Country: United Kingdom of Great Britain and Ireland
- Colour: Bay
- Breeder: Lord Rosebery
- Owner: Lord Rosebery
- Trainer: Mathew Dawson
- Record: 13: 3-1-3
- Earnings: £14,334 win prize money

Major wins
- Epsom Derby (1895); St Leger (1895)

Sir Visto (1892–1914) was a British Thoroughbred racehorse and sire. In a career that lasted from 1894 to 1896 he ran thirteen times and won three races. As a three-year-old in 1895 he won both The Derby and the St Leger at Doncaster. He failed to win in six subsequent races and was retired to stud at the end of the 1896 season.

== Background ==
Sir Visto was described as “a lengthy, rather plain bay with sickle hocks”, but an excellent mover. He was also described as looking powerful but "unfurnished" and "split-up". He was bred at the Crafton Stud by his owner Lord Rosebery, a prominent Liberal statesman who became Prime Minister in 1894. Sir Visto's St Leger was the last of twenty-eight classic wins gained by his trainer Mathew Dawson. Dawson, who was over seventy at the time had "retired" from large-scale training in 1885, but continued to handle a small number of horses at his Melton House Stable.

Sir Visto's sire was Barcaldine, a representative of the Godolphin Arabian sire line, who also sired the double Classic winner Mimi. Sir Visto's dam, Vista, was a broodmare who also produced the Derby runner up Velasquez, and Bona Vista the 2000 Guineas winner who, as the grandsire of Phalaris is the male-line ancestor of most modern thoroughbreds.

== Racing career ==
=== 1894: two-year-old season ===
Sir Visto made his first appearance at Epsom at the Derby meeting in June. Ridden by John Watts, he was not particularly fancied and finished unplaced behind Saintly in the Woodcote Stakes. Later reports claimed that he was only "half-fit" for the race. He was then off the course for four months before reappearing in the valuable Imperial Produce Stakes at Kempton. He led into the final furlong and held off the late challenge of the filly Float by a short head with the future 1000 Guineas Galeottia in third.

At the end of the year, a writer in The Sportsman noted that Sir Visto had "grown and gone on well", and had been seen working with the stable's 1894 Derby winner Ladas.

=== 1895: three-year-old season ===
==== Spring ====
Before the season began, Sir Visto was identified as one of the "most-fancied" Derby contenders in what was regarded as an unusually open year, with no dominant champion. Lord Rosebery was reported to have described the colt as a stayer who would be well suited by the Derby distance of one and a half miles. On his three-year-old debut, Sir Visto ran in the 2000 Guineas at Newmarket on 1 May and started 5/1 third favourite of the eight runners. Ridden by Walter Bradford, he raced prominently and led at half way. In the last quarter mile he was overtaken, but ran on to finish third, three lengths behind the winner Kirkconnel and two behind the runner-up Laveno.

Two weeks later he finished third, beaten a neck and three quarters of a length, to The Owl and Solaro in an "exciting race" for the Newmarket Stakes, with Kirkconnel fourth

==== Summer ====
The 1895 Derby was one of the first to be filmed. Sir Visto is the horse exiting the bottom left corner of the frame.

At Epsom on 29 May, Sir Visto started at odds of 9/1 in a field of fifteen for the Derby. The race took place on a bright, breezy day in front of a crowd including the Prince of Wales. Chibiabos made the early running before Beckhampton took over and led the field into the straight. Sir Visto, ridden by Sam Loates, had been held up at the back of the field and began to make steady "almost unobserved" progress in the last half mile. Curzon and Kirkconnel moved past Beckhampton two furlongs from the finish and raced alongside each other with the race apparently between them until Sir Visto appeared on the stands-side traveling with a "remarkable rapidity" to take the lead fifty yards from the line. He won by three-quarters of a length from Curzon with Kirkconnel half a length further back in third.

The race was filmed by the photographer and film pioneer Birt Acres. The footage was considered lost until its rediscovery in 1995. Racing historian Michael Church, of the Racing Post, viewed the film and confirmed that it was the 1895 race.

On 4 July he carried top weight of 131 pounds in the £10,000 Princess of Wales's Stakes at Newmarket. He was never among the leaders and finished unplaced behind the odds-on favourite Le Var, to whom he was conceding sixteen pounds.

==== Autumn ====
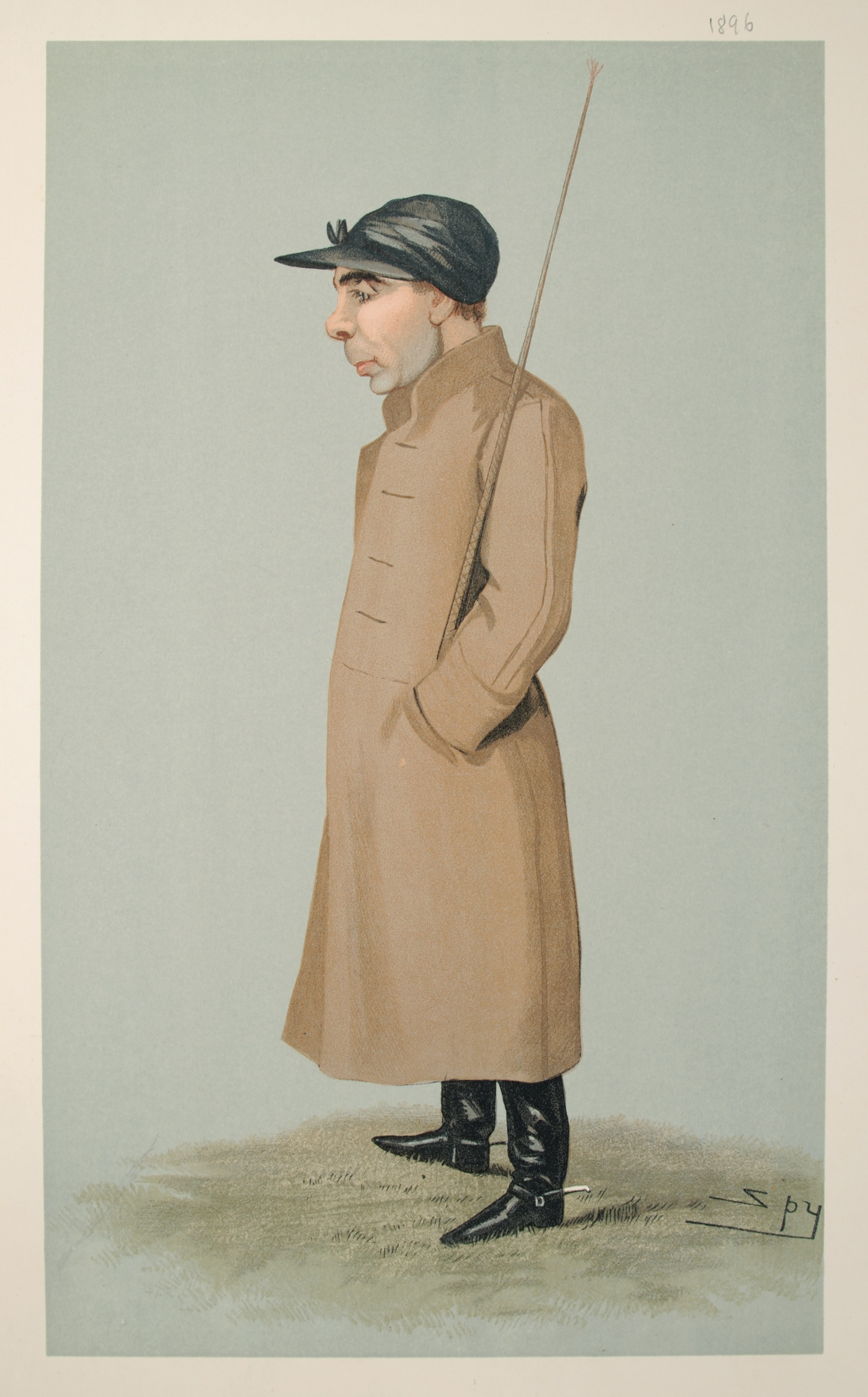
Sam Loates, who rode Sir Visto to victory in the Derby

In the St Leger on 11 September Sir Visto started 9/4 favourite in a field of eleven. His connections were given a cause for concern on the day before the race when the colt was left unattended and became cast in his box. He sustained a minor injury to a foreleg but was allowed to run. As at Epsom, Sir Visto was held up towards the rear of the field as the pace was set first by Lord Chester and then Matchmaker. The filly Butterfly, winner of the Coronation Stakes, took the lead in the straight with Sam Loates moving Sir Visto up to second. A furlong from the finish Sir Visto took the lead and held off the sustained challenge of the outsider Telescope to win an "exciting" and "well contested" race by three-quarters of a length. After the race he was described as looking "stiff and sore" and "much distressed", with observers suggesting that he was suffering from the combined effects of the hard race and his leg injury. Sir Visto never won another race.

On his last race of the year he ran in the £10,000 Jockey Club Stakes at Newmarket on 26 September. Lord Rosebery "declared to win" with Ladas, leaving Sir Visto to carry his second colours. Carrying 133 pounds he made no show and was unplaced behind Laveno, who was carrying seventeen pounds less.

=== 1896: four-year-old season ===
Sir Visto was kept in training as a four-year-old in 1896 with the Gold Cup as his principal target. He made his seasonal reappearance in the Ascot race on 18 June but although he looked impressive, with one commentator noting that he had "grown into a grand horse", he was never a danger and finished last of the six runners behind Love Wisely. He did rather better in his next race two weeks later when he finished fifth of the nine runners behind St Frusquin and Persimmon in an exceptionally strong field for the Princess of Wales's Stakes.

On 2 October he produced his best performance in over a year when he finished two lengths second to Persimmon in the Jockey Club Stakes over ten furlongs. Carrying top weight of 142 pounds, he was never able to threaten the winner, but proved too good for the rest of a strong field which included Laveno and Kirkconnel Eleven days later he started 5/4 favourite for the Champion Stakes (a much less valuable race) over the same course and distance, but finished third of the four runners, beaten three quarters of a length and three lengths by Labrador and Marco. On his final start, Sir Visto ran in the Cambridgeshire Handicap at Newmarket on 28 October, carrying 122 pounds. He finished twelfth of the twenty-four starters behind Winkfield's Pride, who carried 94 pounds, and was then retired to stud.

== Assessment and earnings ==
After his win in the Derby was rated fourteen pounds inferior to Ladas by his trainer Mat Dawson. Later in the season, after his win in the St Leger he was being described as the best stayer of a sub-standard generation.

Sir Visto earned £4,309 in win prize money at two, and £10,025 at three.

== Stud career ==
Sir Visto was retired to his birthplace at Mentmore for his stud career, but made no impact as a stallion. His last foals were conceived in 1908, after which he was retired to Lord Rosebery's stables at The Durdans near Epsom. He was euthanized in July 1914 and buried at The Durdans where a stone still marks the spot.

== Pedigree ==
Pedigree of Sir Visto (GB), bay stallion, 1892
Sire Barcaldine (IRE) 1878	Solon; 1861	West Australian	Melbourne
Sire Barcaldine (IRE) 1878	Solon; 1861	West Australian	Mowerina
Sire Barcaldine (IRE) 1878	Solon; 1861	Birdcatcher mare	Birdcatcher
Sire Barcaldine (IRE) 1878	Solon; 1861	Birdcatcher mare	Hetman Platoff mare
Sire Barcaldine (IRE) 1878	Ballyroe; 1872	Belladrum	Stockwell
Sire Barcaldine (IRE) 1878	Ballyroe; 1872	Belladrum	Catherine Hayes
Sire Barcaldine (IRE) 1878	Ballyroe; 1872	Bon Accord	Adventurer
Sire Barcaldine (IRE) 1878	Ballyroe; 1872	Bon Accord	Birdcatcher mare
Dam Vista (GB) 1879	Macaroni; 1860	Sweetmeat	Gladiator
Dam Vista (GB) 1879	Macaroni; 1860	Sweetmeat	Lollypop
Dam Vista (GB) 1879	Macaroni; 1860	Jocose	Pantaloon
Dam Vista (GB) 1879	Macaroni; 1860	Jocose	Banter
Dam Vista (GB) 1879	Verdure; 1867	King Tom	Harkaway
Dam Vista (GB) 1879	Verdure; 1867	King Tom	Pocahontas
Dam Vista (GB) 1879	Verdure; 1867	May Bloom	Newminster
Dam Vista (GB) 1879	Verdure; 1867	May Bloom	Lady Hawthorn (Family: 4)
