= Sainfoin (horse) =

British-bred Thoroughbred racehorse

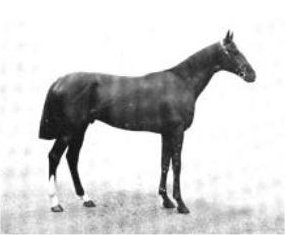
- Sire: Springfield
- Grandsire: St. Albans
- Dam: Sanda
- Damsire: Wenlock
- Sex: Stallion
- Foaled: 1887
- Died: October 1911 (aged 23–24)
- Country: United Kingdom of Great Britain and Ireland
- Colour: Chestnut
- Breeder: Hampton Court Stud
- Owner: 1) Sir Robert Jardine; 2) Sir James Miller; 3) Lord Carnarvon
- Trainer: John Porter
- Record: 8: 5–0–1

Major wins
- Astley Stakes (1889); Esher Stakes (1890); Dee Stakes (1890); December Stakes (1890); Epsom Derby (1890)

Honours
- HMS Sainfoin named after racehorse
- Last updated on 5 May 2011

Sainfoin (1887 – October 1911) was a British Thoroughbred racehorse that was the winner of the 1890 Epsom Derby and was the sire of Rock Sand, the tenth winner of the Triple Crown in 1903.

== Pedigree ==
Sainfoin was sired by Springfield out of the mare Sanda and was foaled at Hampton Court Stud, owned by Queen Victoria, in 1887. Most of the yearlings produced by Hampton Court Stud were underfed and skinny, which resulted in little interest in Sainfoin as a racing prospect. He was sold as a yearling for 550 guineas to horse trainer John Porter and Sir Robert Jardine.

== Racing career ==
Sainfoin's only start and win as a two-year-old was in the £928 Astley Stakes at Lewes Racecourse. He carried 120 pounds and won easily by one and a half lengths from Garter, from whom he was receiving eight pounds.

In 1890, he made his first appearance in the Esher Stakes, a handicap race at Sandown. After the race, Porter felt that the colt would have little chance in the Derby, and accepted an offer of £6,000 for him from Sir James Miller, an officer in the 14th King's Hussars. The sale contract however, contained a clause which stated that if Sainfoin won the Derby, his previous owners would receive half the prize money. On 8 May, Sainfoin won a two runner race for the Dee Stakes at Chester.

On 4 June he started at odds of 100/15 (approximately 6.7-1) in The Derby for which Surefoot was favourite. Surefoot was always expected to be favourite, especially after he had won the 2000 Guineas and on the day of the race he was the subject of very heavy betting, so that he started at odds of 40/95. There was an unusually small field of eight runners and the race took place on heavy ground in driving rain. Sainfoin, ridden by John Watts, was prominent from the start and disputed the lead with his stable-companion Orwell after a mile. In the straight it became apparent that Surefoot was beaten and Sainfoin gained the advantage over Orwell and then held off the late challenge of Le Nord to win by three quarters of a length. The winning time was an unusually slow 2:49.8.

Sainfoin did not win any races after the Derby at age four, securing a third place in the Imperial Plate and an unplaced finish at the 1891 City and Suburban Handicap. He was retired to stud in 1892.

== Stud career ==
After Miller's death in 1906, Sainfoin was sold to Lord Carnarvon for 700 guineas and stood as stud at the Cloghran Stud in Dublin. Sainfoin's most notable son was Rock Sand, winner of the Triple Crown in 1903, but he was also the damsire (through Tout Suite) of 1926 leading sire and St. Leger winner Hurry On. His name appears in the pedigrees of most top class modern thoroughbreds owing to his daughter, Bromus, who produced the influential stallion Phalaris. Sainfoin died in Carlow, Ireland in October 1911. His death was not reported to the press for more than a year. HMS Sainfoin was named after Sainfoin in 1943.
