= 1901 in sports =

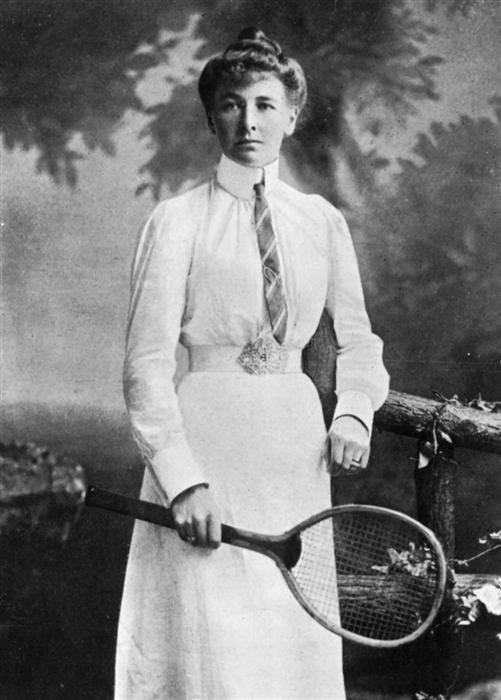
Wimbledon tennis champion Charlotte Cooper Sterry

1901 in sports describes the year's events in world sport.

== American football ==
College championship

- No clear champion is determined in the 1901 season, with Michigan and Harvard being declared retroactive champions by the NCAA. NCAA record books also claim that Yale was chosen by Parke H. Davis as the champion of the season.

Professional championships

- Western Pennsylvania Championship – Homestead Library & Athletic Club

== Association football ==
England

- The Football League – Liverpool 45 points, Sunderland 43, Notts County 40, Nottingham Forest 39, Bury 39, Newcastle United 38
- FA Cup final – Tottenham Hotspur 3–1 Sheffield United at Crystal Palace, London (replay following 2–2 draw at Crystal Palace).
- Tottenham Hotspur is the first (and to date only) non-League club to win the FA Cup since the foundation of the Football League.
- Brighton & Hove Albion FC founded.

Hungary

- Formation of the Hungarian Football Federation (i.e., the Magyar Labdarúgó Szövetség or MLSZ)

Peru

- Alianza Lima, officially founded on February 15.

Scotland

- Scottish Football League – Rangers
- Scottish Cup final – Hearts 4–3 Celtic at Ibrox Park

== Athletics ==
- Jack Caffery wins the fifth running of the Boston Marathon.

== Australian rules football ==
VFL Premiership

- Essendon wins the 5th VFL Premiership – Essendon 6.7 (43) d Collingwood 2.4 (16) at Lake Oval

== Baseball ==
National championship

- National League championship – Pittsburgh Pirates
- American League championship – Chicago White Sox

Events

- The American League repudiates its minor status and competes with the National League as a second major league. The AL abandons four western cities for Washington, Baltimore, Philadelphia and Boston. It signs about 30 prominent NL players before the season begins.
- The National League violates its constitution in the summer and there will be no major-minor agreement until the 1903 season.
- December – numerous minor leagues establish their own National Association of Professional Baseball Leagues, commonly called Minor League Baseball (1902 to date).

== Boxing ==
Events

- Barbados Joe Walcott wins the World Welterweight Championship. He is ranked by Nat Fleischer and Charley Rose as the #1 All-Time Welterweight; other sports personalities such as Tad Dorgan, Tom O'Rourke, Dan Morgan and Jimmy Johnston call him "the greatest pound for pound fighter who ever lived".
- Young Corbett II wins the World Featherweight Championship, defeating "Terrible" Terry McGovern with a second-round knockout
- The vacant World Bantamweight Championship is claimed first by Harry Harris, who fails to defend it and increases his weight, so making himself ineligible. The title is then awarded to Harry Forbes following his second-round knockout of Danny Dougherty

Lineal world champions

- World Heavyweight Championship – James J. Jeffries
- World Middleweight Championship – Tommy Ryan
- World Welterweight Championship – William "Matty" Matthews → James "Rube" Ferns → Barbados Joe Walcott
- World Lightweight Championship – Frank Erne
- World Featherweight Championship – "Terrible" Terry McGovern → Young Corbett II
- World Bantamweight Championship – title vacant → Harry Harris → title vacant → Harry Forbes

== Canadian Football ==
- The ORFU begins to enforce amateurism more strictly by making players sign amateur cards.
- The Burnside Rules, named after John Thrift Meldrum Burnside, are a revised ruleset that begin to be used in the University of Toronto inter-faculty matches.
- Ontario Rugby Football Union - Toronto Argonauts
- Quebec Rugby Football Union - Ottawa College
- Manitoba Rugby Football Union - Winnipeg
- Intercollegiate Rugby Football Union - University of Toronto
- Dominion Championship Game 1 - Toronto ties Ottawa College 12-12
- Dominion Championship Game 2 - Ottawa College defeats Toronto 18-3

== Cricket ==
Events

- No cricket is played in South Africa due to the Boer War.

England

- County Championship – Yorkshire
- Minor Counties Championship – Durham
- Most runs – Bobby Abel 3309 @ 55.15 (HS 247)
- Most wickets – Wilfred Rhodes 251 @ 15.12 (BB 8–53)
- Wisden Cricketers of the Year – Len Braund, Charlie McGahey, Frank Mitchell, Willie Quaife, Johnny Tyldesley

Australia

- Sheffield Shield – Victoria
- Most runs – Clem Hill 620 @ 103.33 (HS 365*)
- Most wickets – Jack Saunders 29 @ 17.13 (BB 6–70) and Joe Travers 29 @ 20.75 (BB 9–30)

India

- Bombay Presidency – Parsees

South Africa

- Currie Cup – not contested

West Indies

- Inter-Colonial Tournament – Trinidad and Tobago

== Figure skating ==
World Figure Skating Championships

- World Men's Champion – Ulrich Salchow (Sweden)

== Golf ==
Major tournaments

- British Open – James Braid
- US Open – Willie Anderson

Other tournaments

- British Amateur – Harold Hilton
- US Amateur – Walter Travis

== Horse racing ==
England

- Grand National – Grudon
- 1,000 Guineas Stakes – Aida
- 2,000 Guineas Stakes – Handicapper
- The Derby – Volodyovski
- The Oaks – Cap and Bells II
- St. Leger Stakes – Doricles

Australia

- Melbourne Cup – Revenue

Canada

- King's Plate – John Ruskin

Ireland

- Irish Grand National – Tipperary Boy
- Irish Derby Stakes – Carrigavalla

USA

- Kentucky Derby – His Eminence
- Preakness Stakes – The Parader
- Belmont Stakes – Commando

== Ice hockey ==
Stanley Cup

- Winnipeg Victorias defeats defending champion Montreal Shamrocks in a Cup challenge, two games to nil
- Winnipeg Victorias wins the Manitoba Hockey Association (MHA) title over the Winnipeg Hockey Club and successfully defends the Stanley Cup title
- Ottawa Hockey Club wins the Canadian Amateur Hockey League (CAHL) championship but declines to challenge Winnipeg for the Stanley Cup

== Lacrosse ==
Events

- Sir Donald Mann donates the Mann Cup.
- Lord Minto, the Governor General of Canada, donates the Minto Cup.
- Ottawa Capitals win the first Mann Cup and the first Minto Cup.

== Motor racing ==
Paris–Berlin Trail

- The Paris–Berlin Trail is run on 27–29 June over 1105 km and won by Henri Fournier (France) driving a Mors in a time of 15:33:06. The race is in retrospect sometimes referred to as the VI Grand Prix de l'ACF.

Paris–Bordeaux Trail

- The Paris–Bordeaux Trail is run on 29 May over 527.1 km and won by Henri Fournier (France) driving a Mors in a time of 6:10:44. The race incorporates the Gordon Bennett Cup (see below).

Gordon Bennett Cup

- The second Gordon Bennett Cup is run from Paris to Bordeaux in conjunction with the Paris–Bordeaux Trail (see above) and won by Léonce Girardot (France) driving a Panhard-Levassor.

Circuit du Sud-Ouest

- The Circuit du Sud-Ouest was run in Pau. Some anglophone sources wrongly call it the 'Pau Grand Prix'. This may stem from a mistranslation of the contemporary French sources such as the magazine La France Auto of March 1901. It was run in four classes around the streets of Pau. The Grand Prix du Palais d’Hiver was the name of the prizes awarded for the lesser classes ('Light cars' and 'Voiturettes'). The Grand Prix de Pau was the name of the prize awarded for the 'Heavy' (fastest) class. Thus Maurice Farman was awarded the 'Grand Prix de Pau' for his overall victory in the Circuit du Sud-Ouest driving a Panhard 24 hp. Additionally the Grand Prix du Palais d’Hiver (400 à 650 kg 'Light car' class) was awarded to Henri Farman (Darracq); the second Grand Prix du Palais d’Hiver for the under 400 kg Voiturettesclass was awarded to Louis Renault (Renault); the Prix du Béarn was awarded to Osmont in a 'De Dion' tricycle.

== Rowing ==
The Boat Race

- 30 March — Oxford wins the 58th Oxford and Cambridge Boat Race

== Rugby league ==
England

- Championship – not contested
- Challenge Cup final – Batley 6–0 Warrington at Headingley Rugby Stadium, Leeds
- Lancashire League Championship – Oldham
- Yorkshire League Championship – Bradford F.C.

== Rugby union ==
Home Nations Championship

- 19th Home Nations Championship series is won by Scotland

== Speed skating ==
Speed Skating World Championships

- Men's All-round Champion – Franz Frederik Wathén (Finland)

== Tennis ==
England

- Wimbledon Men's Singles Championship – Arthur Gore (GB) defeats Reginald Doherty (GB) 4–6 7–5 6–4 6–4
- Wimbledon Women's Singles Championship – Charlotte Cooper Sterry (GB) defeats Blanche Bingley Hillyard (GB) 6–2 6–2

France

- French Men's Singles Championship – André Vacherot (France) defeats Paul Lebreton (France): details unknown
- French Women's Singles Championship – P. Girod (France) defeats Leroux (France) (scores unknown)

USA

- American Men's Singles Championship – William Larned (USA) defeats Beals Wright (USA) 6–2 6–8 6–4 6–4
- American Women's Singles Championship – Elisabeth Moore (USA) defeats Myrtle McAteer (USA) 6–4 3–6 7–5 2–6 6–2

Davis Cup

- 1901 International Lawn Tennis Challenge – United States walkover British Isles

== Yacht racing ==
America's Cup

- The New York Yacht Club retains the America's Cup as Columbia defeats British challenger Shamrock II, of the Royal Ulster Yacht Club, 3 races to 0
