= 1895 in sports =

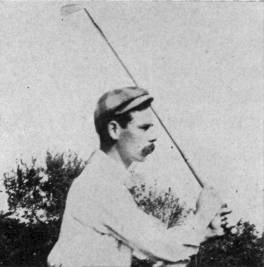
Horace Rawlins, winner of the inaugural U.S. Open in 1895.

1895 in sports describes the year's events in world sport.

== Athletics ==
- USA Outdoor Track and Field Championships

== American football ==
College championship

- College football national championship – Penn Quakers

Events

- 3 September – the earliest known professional football game is played in Latrobe, Pennsylvania where Latrobe YMCA defeats the Jeannette Athletic Club 12–0.

== Association football ==
Belgium

- Formation in Brussels of the Royal Belgian Football Association (Koninklijke Belgische Voetbalbond or KBVB)

Brazil

- Clube de Regatas do Flamengo, officially founded in Rio de Janeiro on November 17.

England

- The Football League – Sunderland 47 points, Everton 42, Aston Villa 39, Preston North End 35, Blackburn Rovers 32, Sheffield United 32
- FA Cup final – Aston Villa 1–0 West Bromwich Albion at Crystal Palace, London. This is the first time Crystal Palace is used as the venue for the final and it will stage all finals until 1914.
- In the Football League, Liverpool is relegated from Division One to Division Two and Bury is promoted. Walsall is expelled from the league and replaced by Loughborough FC (league membership 1895–1900)
- West Ham United founded as Thames Ironworks FC, a works team, by Arnold Hills who is a London shipyard owner.

Scotland

- Scottish Football League – Hearts
- Scottish Cup final – St Bernard's 2–1 Renton at Ibrox Park

Switzerland

- Formation of the Swiss Football Association. It is generally known by the abbreviation of ASF-SFV based on its name in three of the national languages of Switzerland. ASF stands for both French (Association Suisse de Football) and Italian (Associazione Svizzera di Football), while SFV is the German (Schweizerischer Fussballverbund). In the fourth national language of Switzerland, Romansh, it is abbreviated as ASB (Associaziun Svizra da Ballape).

== Australian Rules Football ==
- Victorian Football Association premiers - Fitzroy
- SANFL premiers - South Adelaide
- WAFL premiers - Fremantle

== Bandy ==
Events

- Bandy is introduced to Sweden. The royal family, barons and diplomats are the earliest players.

== Baseball ==
National championship

- Baltimore Orioles win the second of three successive National League championships

Events

- Temple Cup – Cleveland Spiders 4–1 Baltimore Orioles
- Veteran player Bud Fowler and the Page Woven Wire Fence Company organise the Page Fence Giants, a black professional team touring out of Adrian, Michigan. Economic depression in the 1890s has eliminated all but the Cuban Giants in New York City and neighboring states.

== Boxing ==
Events

- Bob Fitzsimmons relinquishes the World Middleweight Championship in order to fight as a heavyweight (there is no light-heavyweight division yet).

Lineal world champions

- World Heavyweight Championship – James J. Corbett
- World Middleweight Championship – Bob Fitzsimmons → title vacant after Fitzsimmons relinquishes it
- World Welterweight Championship – Tommy Ryan
- World Lightweight Championship – title vacant
- World Featherweight Championship – George Dixon
- World Bantamweight Championship – Jimmy Barry

== Canadian Football ==
- The Alberta Rugby Football Union is founded
- Ontario Rugby Football Union - University of Toronto
- Quebec Rugby Football Union - Montreal
- Manitoba Rugby Football Union - St John's
- Northwest Championship - Winnipeg
- Dominion Championship - University of Toronto defeats Montreal 20-5

== Chess ==
Events

- The Grand International Chess Congress is held in the summer at Hastings and is won by Harry Nelson Pillsbury ahead of Mikhail Chigorin and current world champion Emanuel Lasker.

== Cricket ==
Events

- W G Grace's "Indian Summer" in which he scores his 100th career century and becomes the first player to score 1000 first-class runs in a calendar month (i.e., May)
- County Championship expands from 9 to 14 teams with the restoration of Derbyshire and Hampshire; and the introduction of Essex, Leicestershire and Warwickshire
- Inaugural Minor Counties Championship is held

England

- County Championship – Surrey
- Minor Counties Championship – Durham, Norfolk and Worcestershire share the title
- Most runs – W G Grace 2346 @ 51.00 (HS 288)
- Most wickets – Tom Richardson 290 @ 14.37 (BB 9–49)
- Wisden Cricketer of the Year – WG Grace

Australia

- Sheffield Shield – Victoria
- Most runs – Albert Ward 916 @ 41.63 (HS 219)
- Most wickets – George Giffen 93 @ 22.54 (BB 8–77)

India

- Bombay Presidency – Europeans shared with Parsees

South Africa

- Currie Cup – Western Province

West Indies

- Inter-Colonial Tournament – British Guiana

== Golf ==
Events

- Inaugural U.S. Open and US Amateur tournaments are held.

Major tournaments

- British Open – John Henry Taylor
- U.S. Open – Horace Rawlins

Other tournaments

- British Amateur – John Ball
- US Amateur – Charles B. Macdonald

== Horse racing ==
England

- Grand National – Wild Man From Borneo
- 1,000 Guineas Stakes – Galeottia
- 2,000 Guineas Stakes – Kirkconnel
- The Derby – Sir Visto
- The Oaks – La Sagesse
- St. Leger Stakes – Sir Visto

Australia

- Melbourne Cup – Auraria

Canada

- Queen's Plate – Bonniefield

Ireland

- Irish Grand National – Yellow Girl II
- Irish Derby Stakes – Portmarnock

USA

- Kentucky Derby – Halma
- Preakness Stakes – Belmar
- Belmont Stakes – Belmar

== Ice hockey ==
Stanley Cup

- 9 March — Montreal Hockey Club defeats challenger Queen's University to retain the Stanley Cup.
- 9 March — by virtue of winning the 1895 AHAC season, the Montreal Victorias take over the Stanley Cup

Other events

- March — Queen's University defeats Trinity University 17–3 to win the Ontario Hockey Association title and the right to challenge for the Stanley Cup.
- Halifax Stanleys and Dartmouth Jubilees play the first recorded game involving two all-black hockey teams leading to the formation of the Coloured Hockey League based in Halifax, Nova Scotia. The league will feature teams from across Canada's Maritime Provinces and will operate until 1930.

== Motor racing ==
- The Paris–Bordeaux–Paris race is held and is the first real motor race as all competitors start together. The first to arrive is Émile Levassor in a two-cylinder 4 bhp (3.0 kW; 4.1 PS) 1,205 cc (73.5 cu in) Panhard-Levassor. He completes the course in 48 hours and 48 minutes, finishing nearly six hours before the runner-up. Levassor's was disqualified, having only two seats, instead of the required four. The official winner is Paul Koechlin, the third to arrive, 11 hours after Levassor; he is awarded a Fr31,000 prize. Among the other entrants was André Michelin in a Peugeot, on his company's pneumatic tires; he suffered numerous blowouts. The race is in retrospect sometimes referred to as the I Grand Prix de l'ACF. The event proves cars and their drivers can travel very long distances in a reasonable time. It gives an enormous boost to the motor industry and the enthusiastic public interest in the event ensures the popularity of motor racing as a sport.
- 18 May, the first motor race in Italy is held. It is run on a course from Turin to Asti and back, a total of 93 km (58 mi). Five entrants started the event; only three completed it. It was won by Simone Federman in a four-seat Daimler Omnibus, at an average speed of 15.5 km/h (9.6 mph).
- the Chicago Times Herald sponsors a race; only two entrants arrive.
- 24 September-3 October, the Automobile Club de France sponsors the longest race to date, a 1,710 km (1,060 mi) event, from Bordeaux to Agen and back. Because it is held in ten stages, it can be considered the first rally. The first three places are taken by a Panhard, a Panhard, and a three-wheeler De Dion-Bouton.
- November – subsequently, several French motoring pioneers form the Automobile Club de France (ACF), which thereafter will govern most major races in France.

== Rowing ==
The Boat Race

- 30 March – Oxford wins the 52nd Oxford and Cambridge Boat Race

== Rugby football ==
- 27 August – Twenty-one rugby clubs in the north of England split from the Rugby Football Union over the issue of broken time payments and form the Northern Rugby Football Union, which is the forerunner of the Rugby Football League. In due course, two separate codes of rugby football develop: rugby union, governed by the RFU; and rugby league, governed by the Northern Union, which is subsequently called the Rugby Football League (RFL).

Union

- 13th Home Nations Championship series is won by Scotland

League

- The Northern Union establishes its National Championship, Lancashire League Championship and Yorkshire League Championship competitions ahead of the inaugural 1895–96 season.
- 7 September – inaugural rugby league season begins.

== Speed skating ==
Speed Skating World Championships

- Men's All-round Champion – Jaap Eden (Netherlands)

== Tennis ==
England

- Wimbledon Men's Singles Championship – Wilfred Baddeley (GB) defeats Wilberforce Eaves (GB) 4–6 2–6 8–6 6–2 6–3
- Wimbledon Women's Singles Championship – Charlotte Cooper Sterry (GB) defeats Helen Jackson (GB) 7–5 8–6

France

- French Men's Singles Championship – André Vacherot (France) defeats Laurent Riboulet (France) 9–7 6–2

USA

- American Men's Singles Championship – Fred Hovey (USA) defeats Robert Wrenn (USA) 6–3 6–2 6–4
- American Women's Singles Championship – Juliette Atkinson (USA) defeats Helen Hellwig (USA) 6–4 6–2 6–1

== Volleyball ==
Events

- 9 February – William G Morgan invents volleyball

== Yacht racing ==
America's Cup

- The New York Yacht Club retains the America's Cup as Defender defeats British challenger Valkyrie III, of the Royal Yacht Squadron, 3 races to 0. (Valkyrie III is disqualified in the second race and abandons the third.)
