= 1901 Belmont Stakes =

American horse race

35th Belmont Stakes
- Belmont Stakes
- Location: Morris Park Racecourse; Morris Park, New York, United States
- Date: May 23, 1901
- Distance: 1 3/8 mi (11 furlongs; 2,213 m)
- Winning horse: Commando
- Winning time: 2:21.00
- Jockey: Henry Spencer
- Trainer: James G. Rowe Sr.
- Owner: James R. & Foxhall P. Keene
- Conditions: Fast
- Surface: Dirt

The 1901 Belmont Stakes was the 35th running of the Belmont Stakes. It was the 12th Belmont Stakes held at Morris Park Racecourse in Morris Park, New York and was run on May 23, 1901. The race drew three starters and was won by the heavily favored Commando whose winning time of 2:21 flat set a new record for the Belmont Stakes at the 1 3/8 miles distance on dirt.

Bred and raced by James R. Keene, Commando easily won the race by a half length over the 1901 Preakness Stakes winner The Parader. Third place went to All Green who was never in the race from the start and wisely was not pushed by jockey Willie Shaw, finishing a further fifty lengths back.

For future U.S. Racing Hall of Fame trainer James G. Rowe Sr., it marked the third of his record eight wins in the Belmont Stakes.

Commando's Canadian-born jockey Henry Spencer earned his second of two career wins in the American Classics having won the 1900 Preakness Stakes aboard Hindus.

The 1901 Kentucky Derby was run on April 29 and the 1899 Preakness Stakes on May 28, five days after the Belmont.

The 1919 Belmont Stakes would mark the first time the race would be recognized as the third leg of a U.S. Triple Crown series.

== Results ==
Finished	Post	Horse	Jockey	Trainer	Owner	Time / behind	Win $
1	3	Commando	Henry Spencer	James G. Rowe Sr.	James R. & Foxhall P. Keene	2:21.00	$11,595
2	2	The Parader	Frank Landry	Thomas J. Healey	Richard T. Wilson Jr.	1/2	
3	1	All Green	Willie Shaw	Charles T. Patterson	Charles T. Patterson	50	

- Winning breeder: James R. Keene (KY)
