= 1901 Preakness Stakes =

26th running of the Preakness Stakes

26th Preakness Stakes
- Preakness Stakes
- Location: Gravesend Race Track, Coney Island, New York; United States
- Date: May 28, 1901
- Winning horse: The Parader
- Winning time: 1:47 1/5
- Jockey: Frank Landry
- Trainer: Thomas J. Healey
- Owner: Richard T. Wilson Jr.
- Conditions: Fast
- Surface: Dirt

The 1901 Preakness Stakes was the 26th running of the $2,500 Preakness Stakes, a Thoroughbred horse race for three-year-olds run on May 28, 1901, at the Gravesend Race Track on Coney Island, New York. The Parader won the one mile, 70-yard race over runner-up Sadie S. The race was run on a track rated heavy in a final time of 1:47 1/5.

The 1901 Kentucky Derby was run on April 29, and the 1901 Belmont Stakes was run on May 23. The Parader did not run in the Derby but finished second in the Belmont to future U.S. Racing Hall of Fame inductee Commando.

It would be his first and only Preakness win for jockey Frank Landry. For future Hall of Fame trainer T. J. Healey, it would mark the first of five Preakness wins.

The 1919 Preakness Stakes would mark the first time the race would be recognized as the second leg of a U.S. Triple Crown series.

Finished	Post	Horse	Jockey	Trainer	Owner	Time / behind
1	4	The Parader	Frank Landry	Thomas J. Healey	Richard T. Wilson Jr.	1:47.20
2	5	Sadie S.	John Slack		P. H. Sullivan	2
3	1	Dr. Barlow	George M. Odom		W. I. Kilpatrick	head
4	2	Outlander	Henry Spencer	James G. Rowe Sr.	James R. & Foxhall P. Keene	2
5	3	The Golden Prince	Tommy Burns	Ed Steeds	James L. Holland	20

- Winning Breeder: Belle Meade Stud (TN)
