= Handicapper (horse) =

British-bred Thoroughbred racehorse

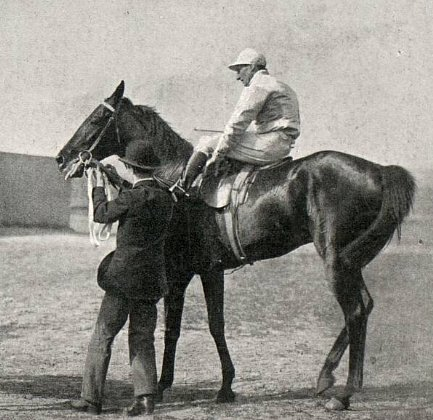
- Handicapper returning to scales after winning the 2000 Guineas.
- Sire: Matchmaker
- Grandsire: Donovan
- Dam: Agnes Osborne
- Damsire: Beaudesert
- Sex: Stallion
- Foaled: 1898
- Country: United Kingdom
- Colour: Brown
- Breeder: D Fraser
- Owner: Ernest Cassel
- Trainer: Fred Day
- Record: 10: 2-1-2 (incomplete)

Major wins
- Richmond Stakes (1900); 2000 Guineas (1901)

Handicapper (1898 – 1921) was a British Thoroughbred racehorse. He showed some promising form as a juvenile in 1900 when he finished fourth in the July Stakes and then won the Richmond Stakes. After running poorly on his three-year-old debut he recorded a major upset when he won the 2000 Guineas at odds of 33/1. Handicapper raced until the age of five but never won another race of any significance.

== Background ==
Handicapper was a brown horse bred in England by D Fraser. As a yearling he was bought for 380 guineas by Ernest Cassel who sent him into training with his private trainer Fred Day at Lowther House in Newmarket, Suffolk.

He was sired by Matchmaker, whose wins included the King Edward VII Stakes and the Princess of Wales's Stakes. His biggest impact as a breedings stallion was as the damsire of Son-in-Law. Handicapper's dam Agnes Osborne was a daughter of Wild Aggie, a broodmare whose other descendants have included Sagace, Slip Anchor and Buena Vista.

== Racing career ==
=== 1900: two-year-old season ===
Handicapper made his first appearance at Royal Ascot in June when he finished unplaced behind Bay Melton in the New Stakes. A month later at Newmarket Racecourse he ran fourth in the July Stakes, a race in which Doricles and Veles dead-heated for first place. Despite his unremarkable form he started 13/8 favourite for the Richmond Stakes at Goodwood Racecourse. Ridden by the American jockey Lester Reiff he won from Osboch, with St Monans in third. He ended his year in the Moulton Stakes at Newmarket in October when he was beaten a neck into second by the filly Aida.

=== 1901: three-year-old season ===
Handicapper began his second season at Newmarket in April when he ran unplaced behind the four-year-old Petridge in a minor handicap race. On 1 May 1901 Handicapper started a 33/1 outsider for the 93rd running of the 2000 Guineas over the Rowley Mile. Veles started favourite ahead of Doricles, Orchid (Champagne Stakes) and Lord Bobs (Dewhurst Stakes) in a field of seventeen. Ridden by Bill Halsey he took the lead at half way, went clear of his rivals, and "sailed past the post, the easiest of winners" two lengths clear of Doricles with Osboch a neck away in third place. The Jockey Club held an inquiry into the colt's dramatic improvement but were satisfied by Fred Day's explanation.

As a result of his win in the Guineas, Handicapper was strongly fancied for the Epsom Derby a month later but his odds drifted on the day of the race and he was not among the first ten finishers in a race won by Volodyovski. At Royal Ascot later in June Handicapper finished unplaced behind the Duke of Devonshire's Lauzun in the St James's Palace Stakes. His poor form led to him being described as "one of the worst horses that have attained classic honours".

=== Later career ===
Handicapper remained in training for at least two more years but failed to win any further major races. At the age of five in 1903 he finished third in the Royal Hunt Cup. In the Liverpool Cup he finished third to the six-year-old Captain Kettle, to whom he was conceding 23 pounds in weight.

== Assessment and honours ==
In their book, A Century of Champions, based on the Timeform rating system, John Randall and Tony Morris rated Handicapper an "poor" winner of the 2000 Guineas.

== Stud career ==
Handicapper was exported to Belgium in 1904, where is progeny earned 700,000 francs. Exported to Germany in 1913, Handicapper was standing in Reuthen, Germany in 1916 for a fee of 500 marks. Handicapper died in 1921.

== Pedigree ==
Pedigree of Handicapper (GB), brown stallion, 1898
Sire Matchmaker (GB) 1892	Donovan (GB); 1886	Galopin	Vedette^
Sire Matchmaker (GB) 1892	Donovan (GB); 1886	Galopin	Flying Duchess
Sire Matchmaker (GB) 1892	Donovan (GB); 1886	Mowerina (DEN)	Scottish Chief (GB)
Sire Matchmaker (GB) 1892	Donovan (GB); 1886	Mowerina (DEN)	Stockings (GB)
Sire Matchmaker (GB) 1892	Match Girl (GB); 1882	Plebeian	Joskin
Sire Matchmaker (GB) 1892	Match Girl (GB); 1882	Plebeian	Queen Elizabeth
Sire Matchmaker (GB) 1892	Match Girl (GB); 1882	Fusee	Marsyas
Sire Matchmaker (GB) 1892	Match Girl (GB); 1882	Fusee	Vesuvienne
Dam Agnes Osborne (GB) 1886	Beaudesert (GB); 1877	Sterling	Oxford
Dam Agnes Osborne (GB) 1886	Beaudesert (GB); 1877	Sterling	Whisper
Dam Agnes Osborne (GB) 1886	Beaudesert (GB); 1877	Sea Gull	Lifeboat
Dam Agnes Osborne (GB) 1886	Beaudesert (GB); 1877	Sea Gull	Wild Cherry
Dam Agnes Osborne (GB) 1886	Wild Aggie (GB); 1870	Wild Dayrell	Ion
Dam Agnes Osborne (GB) 1886	Wild Aggie (GB); 1870	Wild Dayrell	Ellen Middleton
Dam Agnes Osborne (GB) 1886	Wild Aggie (GB); 1870	Fair Agnes	Voltigeur*^
Dam Agnes Osborne (GB) 1886	Wild Aggie (GB); 1870	Fair Agnes	Little Agnes (Family 16-c)

*^ Handicapper is inbred 5S x 4D to the stallion Voltigeur, meaning that he appears fifth generation (via Vedette)^ on the sire side of his pedigree and fourth generation on the dam side of his pedigree.
