= James Percy Miller =

Scottish soldier and racehorse owner

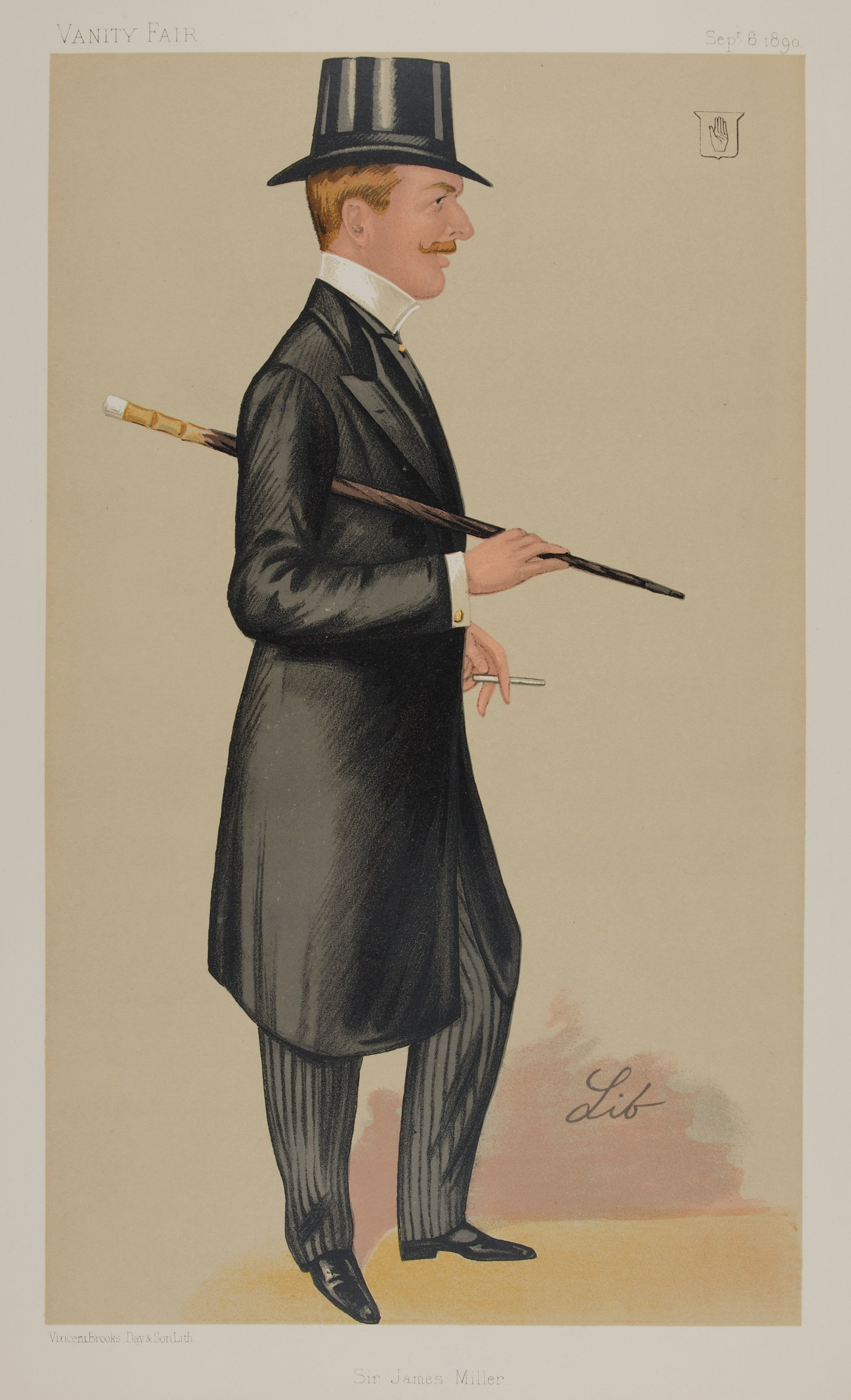
James Percy Miller, Vanity Fair caricature from 6 September 1890

Sir James Percy Miller, 2nd Baronet, DSO (22 October 1864 – 22 January 1906) was a British soldier, known as a racehorse owner. Over the 17 years when he had horses in training, Miller won 161 races, worth £114,005.

== Life ==
Miller was the eldest surviving son of Sir William Miller, 1st Baronet, by Mary Anne, daughter of John Farley Leith, a Queen's Counsel and Member of Parliament for Aberdeen. He was educated at Eton College and Sandhurst.

Miller was a Captain in the 14th Hussars from 1885 to 1892, and Adjutant from 1888 to 1892; and served in the Second Boer War from 1900 where in 1901 he was second in command of the sixth battalion, Imperial Yeomanry. He was made an Hon. Major in the army in 1901 and became a full Major in the Lothians and Berwickshire Imperial Yeomanry from March 1902. He was mentioned in dispatches, and was awarded the Distinguished Service Order.

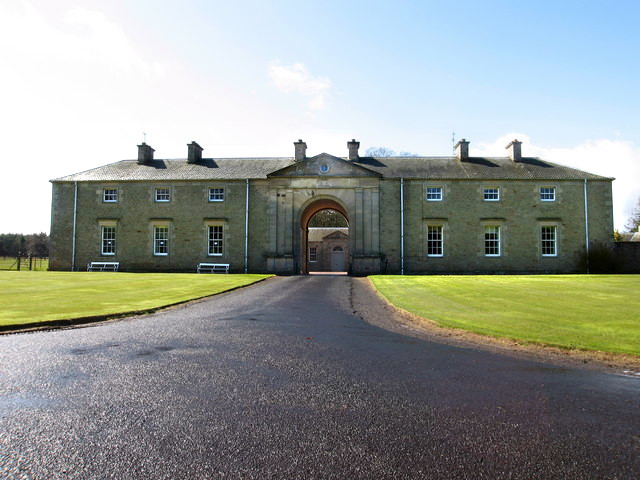
Manderston House Stables

Miller was a Deputy Lieutenant and Justice of the Peace for Berwickshire. His father's fortune, made from herring, allowed Miller to commission the complete rebuild of Manderston House as a stately home, near Duns, Berwickshire. His town residence was 45 Grosvenor Square, Belgravia, London.

On 22 January 1906, Miller died at Manderston at age 41. His remains were interred at Christ Church, Duns.

== On the turf ==
In 1889 Miller, who had previously owned steeplechasers, became an owner of Thoroughbred racehorses. In May 1890, he bought a racehorse called Sainfoin. Less than a month later, the horse won The Derby. The purchase was from Sir Robert Jardine and John Porter; Sainfoin had won the Esher Stakes at Sandown Park easily. The price was £6000, plus half the value of the Derby, if the horse won. Sainfoin came in first, ahead of Le Noir, Orwell, and Surefoot.

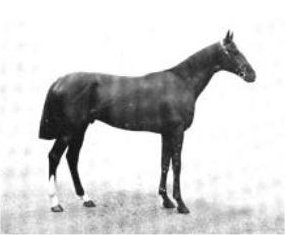
Sainfoin, Derby winner 1890

Miller's next stroke was the purchase in 1894 for 4100 guineas, as a yearling, of the mare Roquebrune (foaled in 1893), by St. Simon, who had been bred by the Duchess of Montrose. With Roquebrune he won the New Stakes at Ascot and the Zetland Stakes at Doncaster. Mated in 1899 with Sainfoin, Roquebrune produced Rock Sand, her first foal. With this colt Miller won in 1902 the Woodcote Stakes at Epsom, the Coventry Stakes at Ascot, the Champagne Stakes at Doncaster, and the Dewhurst Plate at Newmarket. In the following year Rock Sand won the Two Thousand Guineas, Derby, and St. Leger. During the three seasons he was in training, the horse won stakes to the value of £45,618, and helped place Miller at the head of the list of winning owners in 1903 and 1904, with totals of £24,768 and £27,928 respectively.

Rock Sand, Derby winner 1903

In 1895 Miller won the Oaks with La Sagesse, a daughter of Wisdom, and in 1901 his filly Aida, by Galopin, won the One Thousand Guineas. His major success in handicaps was the victory in the Cesarewitch of 1898 with Chaleureux, the sire of the filly Signorinetta, who in 1908 won the Derby and Oaks for Edoardo Ginistrelli.

Miller established a breeding farm at Hamilton Stud, Newmarket, where Rock Sand was foaled. He was elected a member of the Jockey Club in 1903, and became a steward of the Club. In December 1905 he sold by auction most of his mares, and Roquebrune was purchased by a Belgian breeder for 4500 guineas. Rock Sand was sold, after Miller's death, to August Belmont, Jr., for £26,000.

== Family ==
Miller married, 19 January 1893, Eveline (1864–1934), daughter of Alfred Curzon, 4th Baron Scarsdale (1831–1916), by his spouse Blanche (1837–1875), daughter of Joseph Pocklington Senhouse, of Netherhall. They had no issue, and he was succeeded by his brother John Alexander Miller.

== Notes ==
Baronetage of the United Kingdom
Preceded by William Miller	Baronet (of Manderston, Berwickshire); 1874–1887	Succeeded by John Alexander Miller

Attribution

This article incorporates text from a publication now in the public domain: Stephen, Leslie, ed. (1885). "Miller, James Percy". Dictionary of National Biography. Vol. 2. London: Smith, Elder & Co.
