= Aida (horse) =

British-bred Thoroughbred racehorse

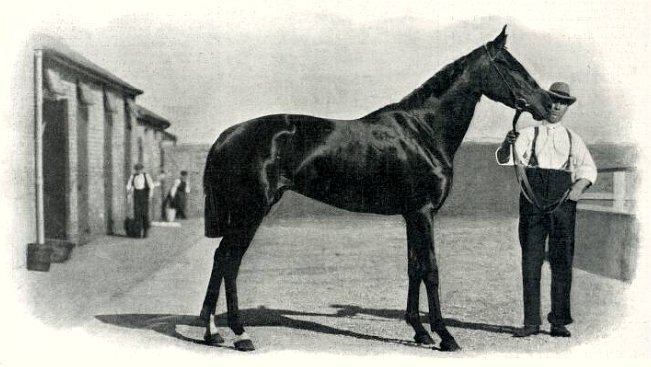
- Aida in 1901.
- Sire: Galopin
- Grandsire: Vedette
- Dam: Queen Adelaide
- Damsire: Hermit
- Sex: Mare
- Foaled: 1898
- Country: United Kingdom
- Colour: Bay
- Breeder: Blankney Stud
- Owner: Sir James Miller
- Trainer: George Blackwell
- Record: 6: 2-2-0

Major wins
- Imperial Produce Stakes (1900); 1000 Guineas (1901)

Aida (1898 – 1915) was a British Thoroughbred racehorse and broodmare. As a juvenile she finished second on her debut and then defeated the future Epsom Derby winner Volodyovski in the Imperial Produce Stakes. She won the 1000 Guineas on her first appearance of 1901 and then finished a close third in a very strong edition of the Newmarket Stakes. She finished unplaced in the Eclipse Stakes and the St Leger and was retired from racing at the end of the year. As a broodmare she had an enduring influence on the breed through her daughter Herself.

== Background ==
Aida was a bay mare bred by Henry Chaplin's Blankney Stud. During her racing career she was owned by Sir James Miller and trained by George Blackwell at Newmarket, Suffolk.

Aida’s sire Galopin was a racehorse who won the Derby in 1872 and went on to be a successful and influential stallion, siring St Simon and Donovan and being Champion sire on three occasions. Her dam, Queen Adelaide, was a racemare who won the July Stakes and Dewhurst Stakes and was placed in the Epsom Derby, Epsom Oaks, 1000 Guineas and Middle Park Stakes. She was a daughter of Adelaide, the foundation mare of Thoroughbred family 9-h.

== Racing career ==
=== 1900: two-year-old season ===
Until 1913, there was no requirement for British racehorses to have official names and two-year-olds were allowed to run without names until 1946. The filly who became Aida began her racing career unnamed and was generally referred to as the Queen Adelaide filly.

The Queen Adelaide filly made her racecourse debut in the Champion Breeders' Biennial Foal Stakes at Derby Racecourse in which she finished second to Sagitta. On 7 October the still unnamed filly contested the £3,000 Imperial Produce Stakes over six furlongs at Kempton Park Racecourse and won from the colt Volodyovski.

=== 1901: three-year-old season ===
On 4 May Aida was one of fifteen fillies to contest the 88th running of the 1000 Guineas and started the 13/8 favourite ahead of Princess Melton and St Aldegonde. Ridden by the American jockey Danny Maher she took the lead soon after the start and made most of the running, setting a pace which had most of the others struggling entering the last quarter mile. After fighting off a challenge from Santa Brigida, Aida was overtaken by Fleur d'Eté but rallied to wear down her rival in the final strides. She won by a neck from Fleur d'Eté with two lengths back to Santa Brigida in third. The fact that she was running for the first time as a named horse led to some confusion in telegraph reports of the race with "Aida" being assumed to be a misreading for "Art" or "Arta".

On her next appearance twelve days later the filly was moved up in distance and matched against male opposition in the Newmarket Stakes over ten furlongs. She produced arguably her best performance as he finished a very close third behind William the Third and Doricles in what was described as "one of the finest struggles ever seen". Aida bypassed the Epsom Oaks and reappeared in the Eclipse Stakes over ten furlongs at Sandown Park on 19 July. She started a 20/1 outsider and finished unplaced behind Epsom Lad. In September Aida contested the St Leger over 14 1/2 furlongs at Doncaster Racecourse and came home tenth of the thirteen runners in a race won by Doricles.

== Assessment and honours ==
In their book, A Century of Champions, based on the Timeform rating system, John Randall and Tony Morris rated Aida an "inferior" winner of the 1000 Guineas.

== Breeding record ==
Aida was retired from racing to become a broodmare. She produced at least five foals between 1903 and 1915:

- Alcanzor, a chestnut colt, foaled in 1903, sired by Sainfoin. Winner over hurdles.
- Zaida, chestnut filly, 1905, by Sainfoin
- Rokeby, bay colt, 1907, by Rock Sand
- Winstanley, bay colt, 1909, by Gallinule. Won Great Yorkshire Stakes.
- Herself, bay filly, 1915, by Neil Gow. Dam of Chatelaine and female-line ancestor of Tom Rolfe, Bee Bee Bee, Ack Ack and Sham.

Aida died in October 1915 at the Sledmere Stud.

== Pedigree ==
Pedigree of Aida (GB), bay mare, 1898
Sire Galopin (GB) 1872	Vedette; 1854	Voltigeur	Voltaire
Sire Galopin (GB) 1872	Vedette; 1854	Voltigeur	Martha Lynn
Sire Galopin (GB) 1872	Vedette; 1854	Mrs Ridgway	Birdcatcher
Sire Galopin (GB) 1872	Vedette; 1854	Mrs Ridgway	Nan Darrell
Sire Galopin (GB) 1872	Flying Duchess; 1853	The Flying Dutchman	Bay Middleton
Sire Galopin (GB) 1872	Flying Duchess; 1853	The Flying Dutchman	Barbelle
Sire Galopin (GB) 1872	Flying Duchess; 1853	Merope	Voltaire
Sire Galopin (GB) 1872	Flying Duchess; 1853	Merope	Juniper mare
Dam Queen Adelaide (GB) 1881	Hermit; 1864	Newminster	Touchstone
Dam Queen Adelaide (GB) 1881	Hermit; 1864	Newminster	Beeswing
Dam Queen Adelaide (GB) 1881	Hermit; 1864	Seclusion	Tadmor
Dam Queen Adelaide (GB) 1881	Hermit; 1864	Seclusion	Miss Sellon
Dam Queen Adelaide (GB) 1881	Adelaide; 1866 (Family: 9-h)	Young Melbourne	Melbourne
Dam Queen Adelaide (GB) 1881	Adelaide; 1866 (Family: 9-h)	Young Melbourne	Clarissa
Dam Queen Adelaide (GB) 1881	Adelaide; 1866 (Family: 9-h)	Teddington mare (1855)	Teddington
Dam Queen Adelaide (GB) 1881	Adelaide; 1866 (Family: 9-h)	Teddington mare (1855)	Maid of Masham (Family: 9-e)

- Aida was inbred 4 × 4 to Voltaire, meaning that this stallion appears twice in the fourth generations of her pedigree.
