= Galeottia (horse) =

British Thoroughbred racehorse

- Sire: Galopin
- Grandsire: Vedette
- Dam: Agave
- Damsire: Springfield
- Sex: Mare
- Foaled: 1892
- Country: United Kingdom
- Colour: Bay
- Owner: Alfred W. Cox
- Trainer: James Ryan
- Record: 13: 2-3-1 (incomplete)

Major wins
- 1000 Guineas (1895)

Galeottia (1892 – 1911) was a British Thoroughbred racehorse and broodmare. She ran consistently well against high-class opposition as a two-year-old in 1894 although she won only one of her seven races. The filly reached her peak in the first half of 1895 when she won the 1000 Guineas and finished second in the Oaks Stakes but did not win any further major races. She had some success as a broodmare especially through her daughter Gay Laura, who produced the English Triple Crown winner Gay Crusader.

== Background ==
Galeottia was a dark bay mare bred in England. During her racing career she was owned by Alfred W. Cox, who ran his horses under the name "Mr Fairie". She was trained at Newmarket, Suffolk by James Ryan.

Her sire Galopin was an outstanding racehorse who won the Derby in 1872 and went on to be a very successful breeding stallion, being Champion sire on three occasions. Her dam Agave was a descendant of the influential British broodmare Sunflower (foaled 1847).

== Racing career ==
=== 1894: two-year-old season ===
On her first major engagement Galeottia finished second to the colt Hopbine in the Whitsuntide Plate at Manchester Racecourse on 19 May. Five days later she started favourite for the Bedford Stakes at Newmarket Racecourse but was beaten three lengths into second place by Kirkconnel. At Royal Ascot on 19 June she contested the Coventry Stakes and ran unplaced behind Whiston. At Kempton Park Racecourse on 7 July she won the £600 Kempton Park Two-Year-Old Plate.

On 5 October Galeottia started a 50/1 outsider for the £5,000 Imperial Produce Stakes over one mile at Kempton in which she was ridden by Fred Pratt and finished third behind Sir Visto and Float. She ended her season by running sixth of the eight runners behind Newsmonger in the Great Lancashire Breeders' Produce Stakes at Liverpool on 8 November.

=== 1895: three-year-old season ===
On 3 May Galeottia was one of fourteen fillies to contest the 1000 Guineas over the Rowley Mile course at Newmarket. Float started the 7/2 favourite ahead of Leopold de Rothschild's Utica and the Duke of Westminster Kissing Cup while Galeottia was next in the betting on 100/8 alongside La Sagesse, Excise and Pet of the Chase. Ridden by Fred Pratt, Galeottia was settled behind the leaders as Float set the pace from Butterfly and Utica. The raced changed complexion in the last quarter mile as several fillies made forward moves and a furlong out Utica was in the lead, just ahead of Lord Rosebery's Gas (a half-sister to Ladas, Butterfly, Galeottia and La Sagesse, with the others well beaten. Galeottia accelerated past her rivals and drew clear in the closing stages to win by three lengths and half a length from La Sagesse and Gas.

Four weeks later Galeottia was moved up in distance for the 119th running of the Oaks Stakes over one and a half miles at Epsom and started at odds of 100/15 in a fifteen-runner field. She took the lead at half way and opened up a clear advantage entering the straight. She looked likely to win but was caught by La Sagesse in the final strides and beaten one and a half lengths into second place with Lord Bradford's Penkridge taking third. At Royal Ascot on 19 June Galeottia was dropped back in distance for the one-mile Coronation Stakes and finished fourth behind Butterfly, Garter Queen and La Sagesse. On 26 September the filly was matched against older horses in the £10,000 Jockey Club Stakes over ten furlongs at Newmarket and came home unplaced behind Ladas.

=== 1896: four-year-old season ===
At the Royal Ascot on 16 June 1896, Galeottia ran fourth behind the three-year-old colt Arlequin in the two-mile Ascot Stakes. In the Liverpool Cup on 23 July she led for most of the way but faded badly in the straight and finished unplaced in a race won by Canterbury Pilgrim.

== Breeding record ==
At the end of her racing career, Galeottia was retired to become a broodmare for Cox's stud. Galeottia died on 22 May 1911 after rupturing a blood vessel. She produced at least four foals between 1904 and 1909:

- Comus, a chestnut colt, foaled in 1904, sired by Cyllene. Exported to stand as a breeding stallion in Uruguay.
- Highness, bay filly, 1906, by Cyllene. Dam of Air Balloon (Queen Alexandra Stakes).
- Cyllius, chestnut colt, 1908, by Cyllene. Sired the Grand National winner Jack Horner
- Gay Laura, bay filly, 1909, by Beppo. Dam of Gay Crusader and Manilardo (Coronation Cup).
- Radish, bay filly, 1910, by Radium.

== Pedigree ==
Pedigree of Galeottia (GB), bay mare, 1892
Sire Galopin (GB) 1872	Vedette; 1854	Voltigeur	Voltaire
Sire Galopin (GB) 1872	Vedette; 1854	Voltigeur	Martha Lynn
Sire Galopin (GB) 1872	Vedette; 1854	Mrs Ridgway	Birdcatcher (IRE)
Sire Galopin (GB) 1872	Vedette; 1854	Mrs Ridgway	Nan Darrell
Sire Galopin (GB) 1872	Flying Duchess; 1853	The Flying Dutchman	Bay Middleton
Sire Galopin (GB) 1872	Flying Duchess; 1853	The Flying Dutchman	Barbelle
Sire Galopin (GB) 1872	Flying Duchess; 1853	Merope	Voltaire
Sire Galopin (GB) 1872	Flying Duchess; 1853	Merope	Juniper mare
Dam Agave (GB) 1884	Springfield; 1873	St Albans	Stockwell
Dam Agave (GB) 1884	Springfield; 1873	St Albans	Bribery
Dam Agave (GB) 1884	Springfield; 1873	Viridis	Marsyas
Dam Agave (GB) 1884	Springfield; 1873	Viridis	Maid of Palmyra
Dam Agave (GB) 1884	Wood Anemone; 1874	King of the Forest	Scottish Chief
Dam Agave (GB) 1884	Wood Anemone; 1874	King of the Forest	Lioness
Dam Agave (GB) 1884	Wood Anemone; 1874	Crocus	Thormanby
Dam Agave (GB) 1884	Wood Anemone; 1874	Crocus	Sunflower (Family 1-g)

- Galeottia was inbred 4 × 4 to Voltaire, meaning that this stallion appears twice in the fourth generation of her pedigree.
