= 1895 Grand National =

English steeplechase horse race

- Grand National
- Location: Aintree
- Date: 29 March 1895
- Winning horse: Wild Man From Borneo
- Starting price: 10/1
- Jockey: Mr Joe Widger
- Trainer: James Gatland
- Owner: John Widger
- Conditions: Heavy

The 1895 Grand National was the 57th renewal of the Grand National horse race that took place at Aintree near Liverpool, England, on 29 March 1895. It was won by Wild Man From Borneo in 10 minutes 32 seconds.

== Finishing Order ==
| Position | Name | Jockey | Age | Handicap (st-lb) | SP | Distance |
|---|---|---|---|---|---|---|
| 01 | Wild Man From Borneo | Mr Joe Widger | 7 | 10-11 | 10/1 | 1.5 lengths |
| 02 | Cathal | Henry Escott | 6 | 10-9 | 100/8 | |
| 03 | Van Der Berg | Bill Dollery | ? | 9-13 | 25/1 | 6 lengths |
| 04 | Manifesto | Terry Kavanagh | ? | 11-2 | 100/8 | |
| 05 | Why Not | Mr EG Fenwick | ? | 12-0 | 50/1 | |
| 06 | Leybourne | George Williamson | ? | 10-3 | 100/8 | |
| 07 | Father O'Flynn | Mr CA Grenfell | ? | 11-1 | 100/7 | |
| 08 | Lady Pat | Shanahan | ? | 10-13 | 25/1 | |
| 09 | Dalkeith | James Knox | ? | 9-12 | 33/1 | |
| 10 | Fin Ma Coul II | W Canavan | 5 | 10-5 | 40/1 | |
| 11 | Molly Maguire | Bill Taylor | 6 | 9-9 | 25/1 | |

== Non-finishers ==
| Fence | Name | Jockey | Age | Handicap (st-lb) | SP | Fate |
|---|---|---|---|---|---|---|
| 16 | Horizon | George Mawson | 6 | 12-2 | 100/14 | Knocked Over |
| 24 | Prince Albert | Mr WP Cullen | ? | 10-12 | 50/1 | Fell |
| 14 | Sarah Bernhardt | E Matthews | ? | 10-10 | 50/1 | Fell |
| ? | Ardcarn | Mr Charles Thompson | ? | 10-10 | 50/1 | Fell |
| 24 | Aesop | Arthur Nightingall | ? | 10-8 | 5/1 F | Fell |
| 14 | Royal Buck | W Slinn | ? | 10-4 | 50/1 | Fell |
| ? | Cock of the Heath | William Hoysted | ? | 10-2 | 100/6 | |
| ? | Caustic | Mr Arthur Gordon | 5 | 10-1 | 100/1 | |
