= Doricles =

British-bred Thoroughbred racehorse

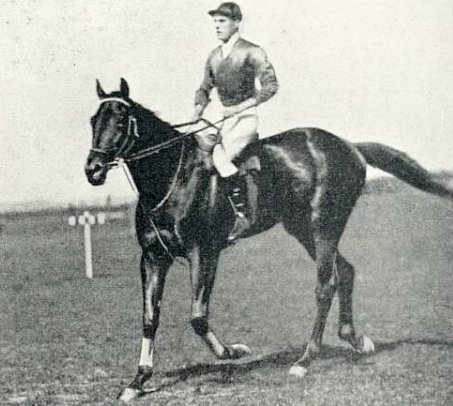
- Doricles in 1901 before Newmarket Stakes.
- Sire: Florizel II
- Grandsire: St Simon
- Dam: Rosalie
- Damsire: Rosicrucian
- Sex: Stallion
- Foaled: 1898
- Country: United Kingdom of Great Britain and Ireland
- Colour: Brown
- Breeder: Leopold de Rothschild
- Owner: Leopold de Rothschild
- Trainer: Alfred Hayhoe
- Record: 13: 4-3-2
- Earnings: £6,955 (1901)

Major wins
- July Stakes (1900); St Leger (1901)

Doricles (1898–1916) was a British Thoroughbred racehorse and sire. Although he ran only twice as a two-year-old in 1900 he showed considerable potential when he dead-heated for first places in the July Stakes. In the following year he was a consistent performer at the highest class who contested all three legs of the Triple Crown. He finished second in the 2000 Guineas and the Newmarket Stakes but disappointed when coming home seventh in the Epsom Derby. He ran second again on his next start, before winning his next three races, culminating in a 40/1 upset victory in the St Leger Stakes. He failed to win again and was retired to become a breeding stallion in France.

== Background ==
Doricles was a "beautiful" brown horse bred in the United Kingdom. During his racing career he was owned by his breeder Leopold de Rothschild and trained by Alfred Hayhoe at the Palace House stable in Newmarket, Suffolk.

Doricles was one of the first crop of foals sired by Florizel II, a high class racehorse and a brother to the Derby winners Persimmon and Diamond Jubilee. Doricles' dam Rosalie also produced St Rosalia, an influential broodmare whose descendants have included Kelso, Alysheba, Farma Way, Bel Bolide and Quiet Reflection.

== Racing career ==
=== 1900: two-year-old season ===
Doricles made his debut in the 48th Triennial Stakes at Ascot Racecourse and finished third behind Veles and Lord Melton. At Newmarket Racecourse on 3 July, Doricles was ridden by Tommy Loates in the July Stakes over five and a half furlongs and started at odds of 10/1. In a "fine race" Doricles dead-heated for first place with Veles with Handicapper among the unplaced finishers.

=== 1901: three-year-old season ===
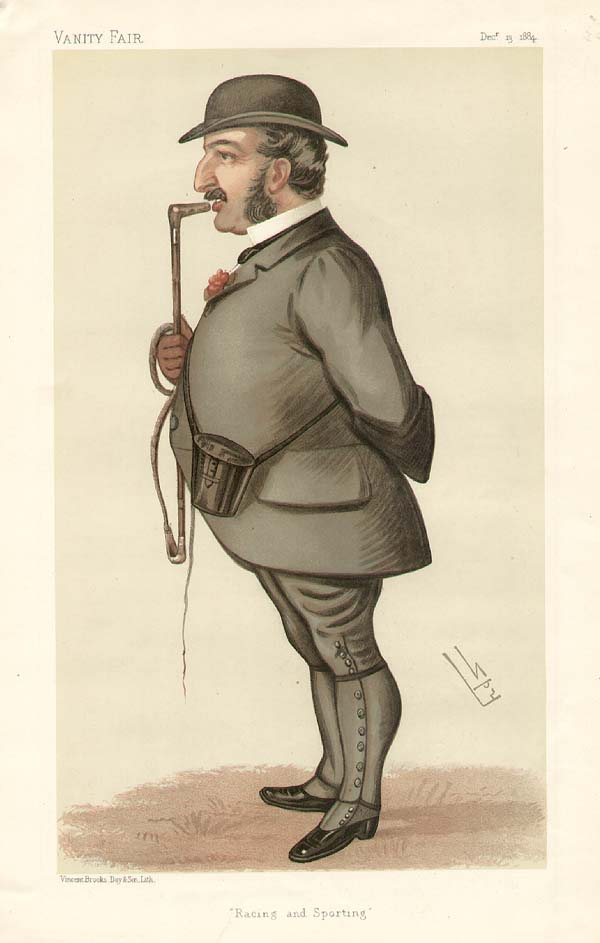
Doricles' owner Leopold de Rothschild

On 1 May 1901 Doricles made his three-year-old debut in the 2000 Guineas over the Rowley mile at Nemarket and started second favourite behind Veles at odds of 4/1. After tracking the leaders for most of the way he made steady headway in the last quarter mile, but was never able to get on terms with the 33/1 outsider Handicapper and finished second, beaten two lengths with Osboch in third. Two weeks later at the next Newmarket meeting the colt was moved up in distance for the Newmarket Stakes over ten furlongs and finished second, beaten a head by William the Third, with the 1000 Guineas winner Aida in third, after what was described as "one of the finest struggles ever seen". In the Epsom Derby over 1 1/2 miles on 5 June Doricles came home seventh of the twenty-five runners behind Volodyovski. On 23 July at Liverpool the colt started 5/2 favourite for the eleven furlong Saint George Stakes, but was beaten a length into second place by Fortunatus. At Brighton Racecourse on 7 August Doricles recorded his first success for over a year when he won the ten furlong Brighton Cup "easily" from four opponents. A week before running in the St Leger the colt won again, taking the Champion Breeders' Biennial Foal Stakes at Derby Racecourse by half a length at odds of 4/7.

On 11 September Doricles, ridden by Kempton Cannon, started a 40/1 outsider in a thirteen-runner field for the 126th running of the St Leger Stakes over 14 1/2 furlongs at Doncaster Racecourse. Volodyovski started the 5/6 favourite while the other runners included Fortunatus, Veronese (Prince of Wales's Stakes), Jacobite (Grand Prix de Deauville), Aida and the Irish-bred Revenue. After settling behind leaders for most of the way, Doricles moved into contention in the straight, gained the advantage approaching the final furlong, and fought off the challenge of Volodyovski to win by a neck. Revenue was three lengths back in third place ahead of Pietmaritzburg. Lester Reiff, the rider of the runner-up, lodged an objection to the winner on the grounds of "bumping", but the racecourse stewards upheld the result. The colt's victory was a first classic success for Cannon and the winning time 3.08.4 was a new record for the race.

The Kempton Park Stakes in October attracted a very strong field and saw Doricles finish fourth behind the four-year-old gelding Epsom Lad. Later that month the colt ran in the Champion Stakes at Newmarket and finished third of the three runners behind Osboch and Pietmaritzburg.

Doricles ended the year with earnings of £6,955, making him the fifth most successful racehorse of the season.

=== 1902: four-year-old season ===
Doricles remained in training as a four-year-old but failed to recover his best form. In early spring he was beaten by St Maclou in a Biennial Stakes at Newmarket, and then ran unplaced behind First Principal in the City and Suburban Handicap at Epsom.

== Assessment and honours ==
In their book, A Century of Champions, based on the Timeform rating system, John Randall and Tony Morris rated Doricles an "average" winner of the St Leger.

== Stud record ==
Doricles was retired from racing to become a breeding stallion in France at the stud of the Duc de Gramont. The most notable of his offspring was Consols, who sired the Prix de l'Arc de Triomphe winner Massine. He died at the stud of Mr. Prat in 1916.

== Sire line tree ==
- Doricles
  - Consols
    - Massine
      - Strip The Willow
      - Le Gosse
        - Le Moutard
          - Zambo
          - Dragon Vert
          - Loupiot
        - Boree
          - Bonosnap
      - Maravedis
        - Samaritain
          - Kingcraft
        - Souverain
      - Mieuxce
        - Paddys Point
      - Sultan Mahomed
      - Blue Moon
      - Boum
      - Massowa
        - Toparoa
  - Montmartin

== Pedigree ==
Pedigree of Doricles (GB), brown stallion, 1898
Sire Florizel II (GB) 1891	St Simon (GB); 1881	Galopin	Vedette
Sire Florizel II (GB) 1891	St Simon (GB); 1881	Galopin	Flying Duchess
Sire Florizel II (GB) 1891	St Simon (GB); 1881	St Angela	King Tom
Sire Florizel II (GB) 1891	St Simon (GB); 1881	St Angela	Adeline
Sire Florizel II (GB) 1891	Perdita (GB); 1881	Hampton	Lord Clifden
Sire Florizel II (GB) 1891	Perdita (GB); 1881	Hampton	Lady Langden
Sire Florizel II (GB) 1891	Perdita (GB); 1881	Hermione	Young Melbourne^
Sire Florizel II (GB) 1891	Perdita (GB); 1881	Hermione	La Belle Helene
Dam Rosalie (GB) 1884	Rosicrucian (GB); 1865	Beadsman	Weatherbit
Dam Rosalie (GB) 1884	Rosicrucian (GB); 1865	Beadsman	Mendicant
Dam Rosalie (GB) 1884	Rosicrucian (GB); 1865	Madame Eglentine	Cowl
Dam Rosalie (GB) 1884	Rosicrucian (GB); 1865	Madame Eglentine	Diversion
Dam Rosalie (GB) 1884	Pitteri (GB); 1868	The Prime Minister	Melbourne*^
Dam Rosalie (GB) 1884	Pitteri (GB); 1868	The Prime Minister	Pantalonade
Dam Rosalie (GB) 1884	Pitteri (GB); 1868	Lurley	Orlando
Dam Rosalie (GB) 1884	Pitteri (GB); 1868	Lurley	Snowdrop (Family 20)

*^ Doricles is inbred 5S x 4D to the stallion Melbourne, meaning that he appears fifth generation (via Young Melbourne)^ on the sire side of his pedigree and fourth generation on the dam side of his pedigree.
