= Wild Man From Borneo =

British half-bred Thoroughbred racehorse

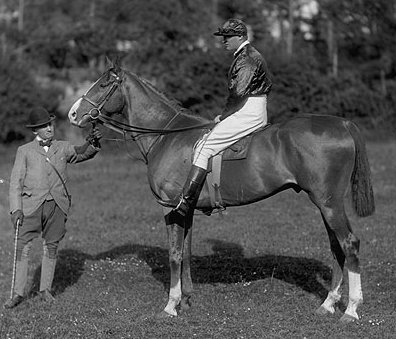
- Wild Man From Borneo with owner Tom Widger
- Sire: Decider
- Grandsire: Umpire
- Dam: Wild Duck (half-bred)
- Damsire: Sheldrake
- Sex: Gelding
- Foaled: 1888
- Country: United Kingdom of Great Britain and Ireland
- Colour: Bay
- Breeder: George Keays
- Owner: 1) J.J. Maher; 2) John and Joe Widger
- Trainer: James Gatland

Major wins
- Grand National (1895)

Wild Man From Borneo, sometimes shortened to Wild Man, (1888 – June 1901) was a half-bred Thoroughbred racehorse that won the 1895 Grand National and was third in the 1894 running.

== Background ==
Wild Man was bred by George Keays at Newton House, Nenagh. His dam, Wild Duck, was a half-Thoroughbred sired by the registered Thoroughbred stallion Sheldrake (seventh in the 1877 St. Leger) out of an unraced half-breed mare. Wild Duck was sold as a four-year-old with the foal Wild Man at foot to J.J Maher. Maher won several steeplechases with Wild Duck, notably the Ward Hunt Cup, before selling her to E. Richardson in 1891, who sold her shortly afterward to a German buyer. Wild Man is Wild Duck's only recorded foal. Maher retained Wild Man until 1893, using him as a hunter initially as a three-year-old and then entering him in steeplechases beginning in April 1892. Wild Man was trained by James Gatland at his Wingrove Stables in Alfriston, Sussex.

== Racing career ==
Wild Man was second in a four-mile Maiden Plate at Punchestown.

Running in the name of Mrs. F. E. Norris, Wild Man finished third to Balmy and Drogheda in the 7 December 1897 Metropolitan Steeplechase at Gatwick.

== Retirement ==
Wild Man From Borneo was retired to his owner's residence in West Derby, Liverpool after his racing career. He died on 1 June 1901 of a fractured pelvis.

== Pedigree ==
Pedigree of Wild Man From Borneo (GB), Bay Gelding, 1888
Sire Decider (GB) Brown, 1868	Umpire (USA); 1857	Lecomte	Boston
Sire Decider (GB) Brown, 1868	Umpire (USA); 1857	Lecomte	Reel
Sire Decider (GB) Brown, 1868	Umpire (USA); 1857	Alice Carneal	Sarpedon (GB)
Sire Decider (GB) Brown, 1868	Umpire (USA); 1857	Alice Carneal	Rowena
Sire Decider (GB) Brown, 1868	Danae (GB); 1857	Kingston	Venison
Sire Decider (GB) Brown, 1868	Danae (GB); 1857	Kingston	Queen Anne
Sire Decider (GB) Brown, 1868	Danae (GB); 1857	Sacrifice	Voltaire
Sire Decider (GB) Brown, 1868	Danae (GB); 1857	Sacrifice	Virginia
Dam Wild Duck (GB) Chestnut, 1884	Sheldrake; 1874	Mandrake	Weatherbit
Dam Wild Duck (GB) Chestnut, 1884	Sheldrake; 1874	Mandrake	Mandragora
Dam Wild Duck (GB) Chestnut, 1884	Sheldrake; 1874	Bonny Breast Knot	Voltigeur
Dam Wild Duck (GB) Chestnut, 1884	Sheldrake; 1874	Bonny Breast Knot	Queen Mary
Dam Wild Duck (GB) Chestnut, 1884	Ireland Yet mare	Ireland Yet (IRE)	Lance
Dam Wild Duck (GB) Chestnut, 1884	Ireland Yet mare	Ireland Yet (IRE)	Gramacgree
Dam Wild Duck (GB) Chestnut, 1884	Ireland Yet mare	William the Conqueror mare	William the Conqueror
Dam Wild Duck (GB) Chestnut, 1884	Ireland Yet mare	William the Conqueror mare	Warlike mare
