= 1901 Grand National =

English steeplechase horse race

- Grand National
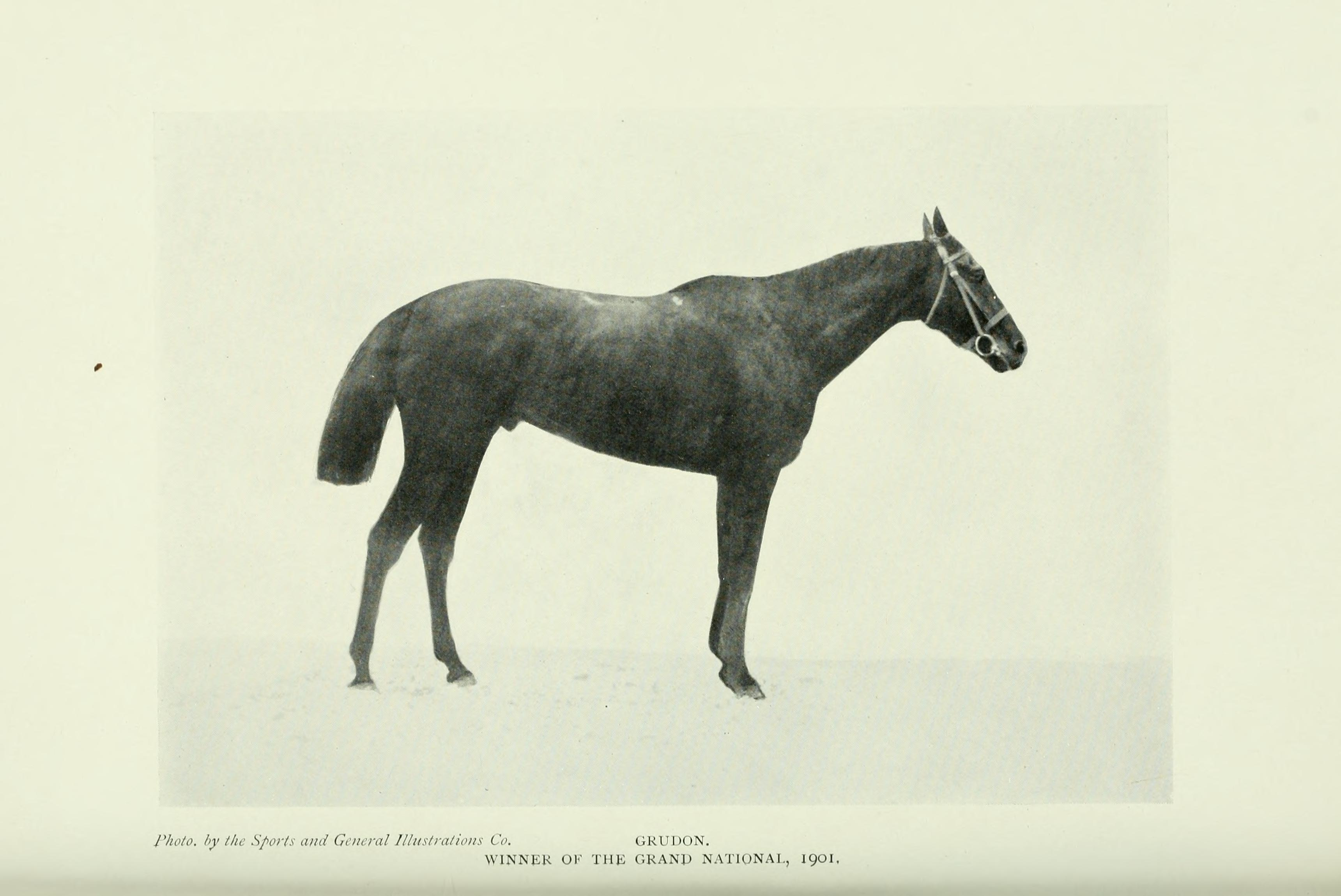
- Grudon (from Heroes and heroines of the Grand National)
- Location: Aintree
- Date: 29 March 1901
- Winning horse: Grudon
- Starting price: 9/1
- Jockey: Arthur Nightingall
- Trainer: Bernard Bletsoe
- Owner: Bernard Bletsoe
- Conditions: Very bad

The 1901 Grand National was the 63rd renewal of the Grand National horse race that took place at Aintree near Liverpool, England, on 29 March 1901. The race was run in a howling snowstorm and was won by the 9/1 chance, Grudon.

== Leading Contenders ==
Grudon was among the leading contenders on the day but with the weather conditions being what they were, most of the trainers and jockeys knew that the race would be reduced to little more than a lottery. Trainer Bernard Bletsoe hit on the idea to pack Grudon's hooves with butter in the hope that this would prevent snow from clogging in them. It is not recorded if any of the other trainers followed this example but it worked as Grudon, a horse who was not rated that highly by his rider, Arthur Nightingall set off without any difficulty while most of the other competitors struggled. Legend has it that Nightingall became so confident that he hacked around most of the second circuit alongside Algy Anthony on his struggling mount Covert Hack until leaving his rival behind with the words "Well I must be going now so ta ta".

== Finishing Order ==
Position	Name	Jockey	Age	Handicap (st-lb)	SP	Distance
01	Grudon	Arthur Nightingall	11	10-0	9/1	4 Lengths
02	Drumcree	Mr Charles H Nugent	?	9-12	10/1	
03	Buffalo Bill	Harry Taylor	?	9-7	33/1	
04	Levanter	Frank Mason	?	9-13	5/1	
05	Fanciful	Mr W P Cullen	?	11-6	100/8	
06	Curagh Hill	C Hagan	?	9-9	25/1	
07	Covert Hack	Algy Anthony	?	11-4	10/1	
08	Prince Tuscan	Mr H Hunt	?	10-6	33/1	Last to complete

== Non-finishers ==
Fence	Name	Jockey	Age	Handicap (st-lb)	SP	Fate
?	Model	Mr William Pawson	?	11-4	40/1	?
?	Cushenden	Mr J G Davies	?	11-2	20/1	?
?	Sunny Shower	Mr Joe Widger	?	10-6	100/1	?
?	Coolgardie	A Waddington	?	10-6	40/1	?
?	The Sapper	William Halsey	?	10-5	100/8	?
?	Mayo's Pride	Mr James Phillips	?	10-5	20/1	?
?	Hompool	Ernest Acres	?	10-5	66/1	?
?	Greystone II	J H Stainton	?	10-1	100/1	?
?	True Blue	Percy Woodland	?	9-13	66/1	?
?	Barsac	Mr Harry Ripley	?	9-13	100/14	?
?	Chit Chat	C Clack	?	9-13	25/1	?
?	Crosset	Mr Frank Hartigan	?	9-13	20/1	?
?	Pawnbroker	J O'Brien	?	9-7	100/6	?
?	Zodiac	Albert Banner	?	9-7	100/1	?
?	Padishah	Arthur Birch	?	10-0	66/1	?
?	Gossip	J Polletti	?	9-7	100/1	?

== Media coverage and aftermath ==
Arthur Nightingall gave credit to his victory to the genius of owner-trainer Bletsoe for having the foresight to prepare the horse with butter as he was convinced the horse would have come to grief without the preparation. Of the race he said, "My orders were to let Grudon run his own race and I found myself laid up with the leading division, never out of the first two or three. Indeed Archie [Algy] Anthony [Covert Hack] and I enjoyed a long and animated conversation for the most part of the journey. It was with a feeling of regret that at last I was obliged to say goodbye to him about a mile from home. "Ta ta old chap. I must push on a trifle faster or the cupboard will be bare when I get there, and wouldn't disappoint old mother Hubbard for the world." "The only mistake he made came 200 yards from the winning post when he jumped a footpath across the course and gave me a bit of a shock."
