= La Sagesse (horse) =

British-bred Thoroughbred racehorse

- Sire: Wisdom
- Grandsire: Blinkhoolie
- Dam: St Mary
- Damsire: Hermit
- Sex: Mare
- Foaled: 1892
- Country: United Kingdom
- Colour: Bay
- Breeder: George Alexander Baird
- Owner: Sir James Percy Miller, 2nd Baronet
- Trainer: Martin Gurry
- Record: 27: 8-1-2

Major wins
- Newmarket Breeders' Plate (1894); Fitzwilliam Stakes (1894); Oaks Stakes (1895); Derby Cup (1896)

La Sagesse (1892 – 1909) was a British Thoroughbred racehorse and broodmare. She was highly tried as a juvenile in 1894, winning six of her thirteen races including the Newmarket Breeders' Plate and the Fitzwilliam Stakes. In the following year she finished second in the 1000 Guineas before recording her biggest victory in the Oaks Stakes and then running third under top weight in the Coronation Stakes. She remained in training until the age of five, competing against male opposition in valuable handicap races. She won the Derby Cup in 1896 and ran third in the City and Suburban Handicap in 1897.

== Background ==
La Sagesse was a bay mare bred in England by George Alexander Baird. On Baird's death in 1893 she was put up for auction and bought for 510 guineas by Sir James Miller. During her racing career she was trained by Martin Gurry at the Abington Place stable in Newmarket, Suffolk.

Her sire Wisdom, who died in 1893, was a failure as a racehorse but became a highly successful stallion, siring good horses such as Sir Hugo, Love Wisely (Ascot Gold Cup) and Surefoot (2000 Guineas, Eclipse Stakes). Her dam, St Mary was a daughter of Adelaide, the foundation mare of Thoroughbred family 9-h.

== Racing career ==
=== 1894: two-year-old season ===
La Sagesse was a very precocious filly who won her first four races in the spring of 1894. On 19 May La Sagesse started 6/5 favourite for the £1,000 Whitsuntide Plate over five furlongs at Manchester Racecourse but finished unplaced behind the colt Hopbine. Three day later at Newmarket Racecourse the filly started 1/2 favourite for the Breeders' Plate and won "easily" by two lengths from Diplomat. At Royal Ascot in June she ran unplaced behind Whiston in the Coventry Stakes. In the Prince of Wales's Nursery Plate over one mile at Doncaster Racecourse on 14 September she was assigned top weight of 117 pounds and finished unplaced behind Telescope. She also won the Fitzwilliam Stakes at the same meeting and contested at least four other races that year to end the season with six wins from thirteen starts.

=== 1895: three-year-old season ===
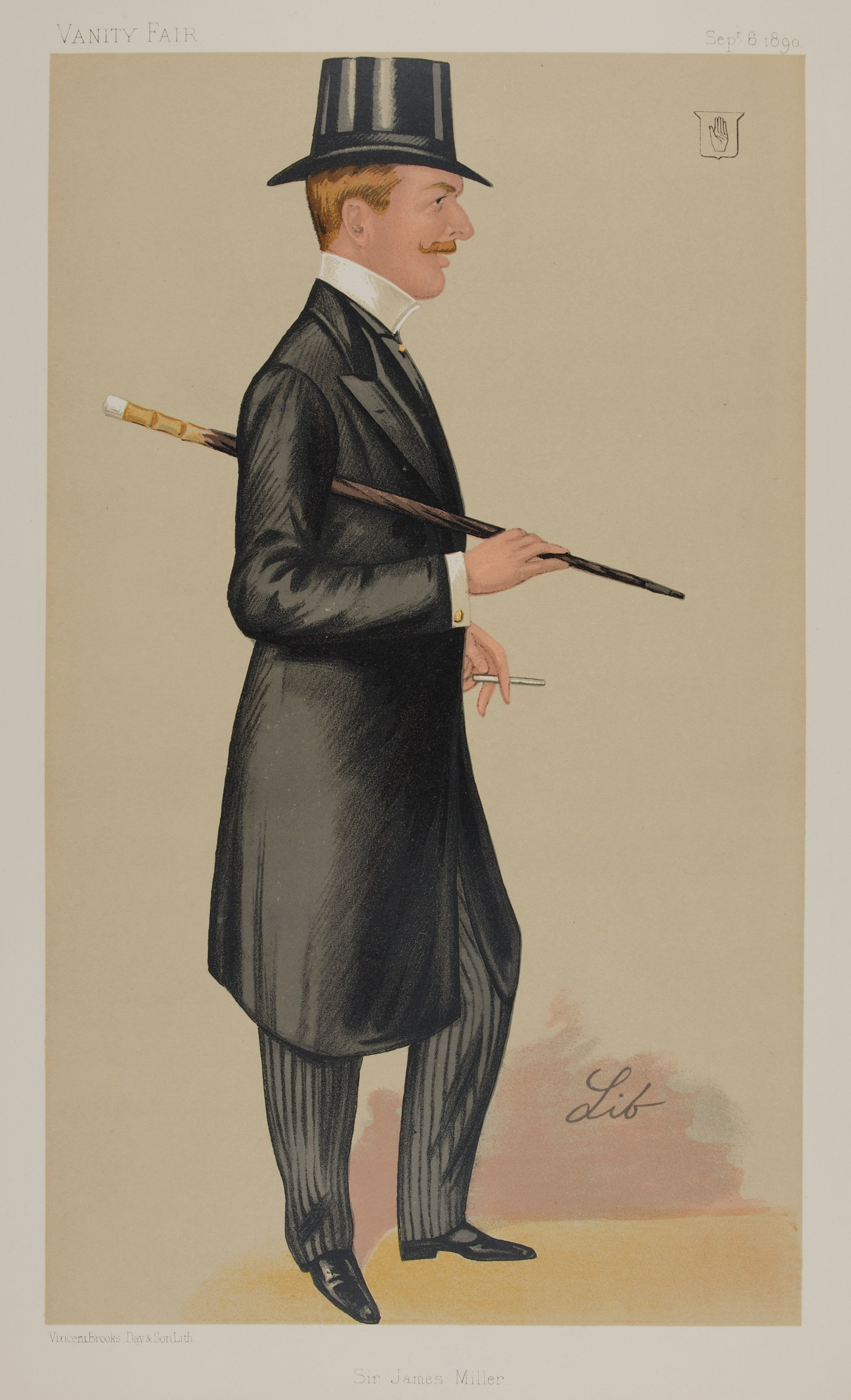
La Sagesse's owner, Sir James Miller

On 3 May La Sagesse was one of fourteen fillies to contest the 1000 Guineas over the Rowley Mile course at Newmarket. Ridden as in most of her races by Sam Loates, she started at odds of 100/8 in a field headed by Float, the 7/2 favourite. After settling just behind the leaders she stayed on well in the last quarter mile but was unable to match the acceleration of Alfred W. Cox's Galeottia and finished second, three lengths behind the winner, with Lord Rosebery's Gas (a half-sister to Ladas) in third.

Four weeks later La Sagesse was moved up in distance for the 119th running of the Oaks Stakes over one and a half miles at Epsom. With Loates again in the saddle she started the 5/1 second favourite behind Garter Queen, while the other thirteen runners included Galeottia, Gas, Ella Tweed (Brocklesby Stakes), Float and Saintly. La Sagesse was not among the early leaders as the outsider Silver Hill set a steady pace before giving way to Galeottia who opened up a clear advantage which she maintained into the straight. La Sagesse was hampered in the last quarter mile and did not obtain a clear run until inside the final furlong. She produced a strong finishing burst, caught Galeottia in the final strides and won by one and a half lengths, with Lord Bradford's Penkridge taking third.

At Royal Ascot on 19 June La Sagesse was dropped back in distance and started favourite for the one-mile Coronation Stakes despite carrying top weight of 129 pounds. She finished third behind Butterfly and Garter Queen, to whom she was conceding 14 pounds and seven pounds respectively. In the Cambridgeshire Handicap at Newmarket in October she started a 28/1 outsider under a weight of 108 pounds and finished unplaced behind Marco.

=== 1896 & 1897: later career ===
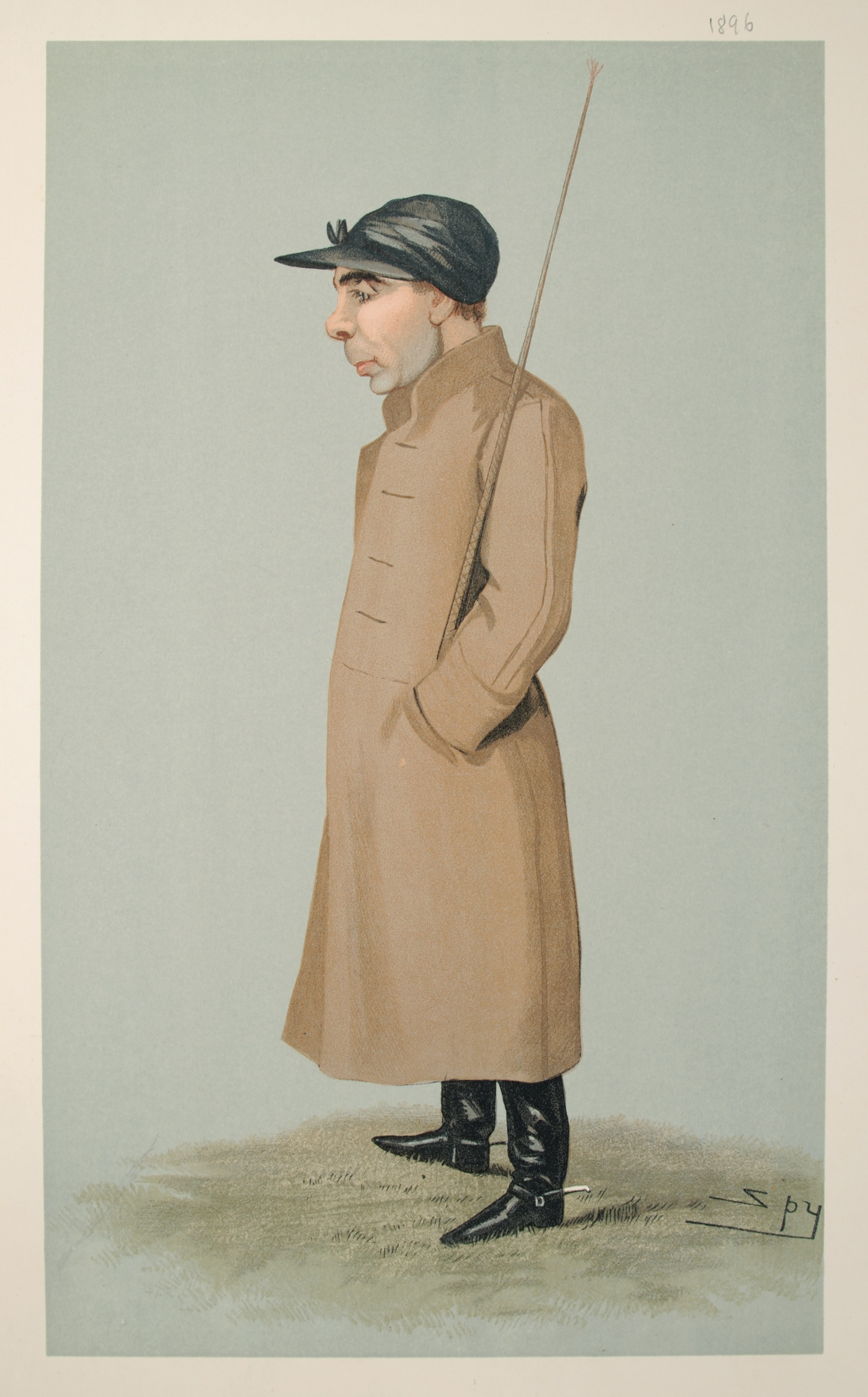
Sam Loates, who rode La Sagesse in most of her major races

On 22 April 1896 La Sagesse began her third campaign in the £2000 City and Suburban Handicap over ten furlongs at Epsom in which she carried 113 pounds and finished unplaced behind the six-year-old Worcester. She subsequently came home unplaced behind Victor Wild in the £3000 Great Jubilee Stakes at Kempton Park Racecourse on 9 May, and was down the field when brought back to sprint distances for the Wokingham Stakes at Ascot on 19 June. She contested her second Cambridgeshire Handicap on 28 October but finished out of the money in a race won by Winkfield's Pride. At Derby Racecourse on 20 November La Sagesse faced Winkfield's Pride again in the one-mile Derby Cup for which she was assigned a weight of 103 points and started at odds of 100/6. Ridden by Sam Loates she took the lead entering the final furlong and held off the late challenge of the five-year-old mare Ghislaine to win by a short head. Diakka took third place ahead of Marco and Winkfield's Pride.

La Sagesse remained in training as a five-year-old mare and began her season by finishing unplaced behind Winkfield's Pride in the Lincolnshire Handicap at Lincoln Racecourse on 23 March. On 28 April, in her second bid to win the City and Suburban Handicap, the mare finished third behind Balsamo and Bay Ronald, to whom she was conceding 8 pounds and 5 pounds respectively. She made little impact in the Great Jubilee Stakes on 16 May, running unplaced in a race which saw victory go the lightly-weighted six-year-old Clwyd. At Derby on 31 August La Sagesse ran unplaced behind Diakka in the Peveril of the Peak Stakes over one mile. La Sagesse ended her racing career by finishing down the field in the Derby Cup on 19 November.

== Breeding record ==
At the end of her racing career, La Sagesse was retired to become a broodmare. She foaled twins sired by Melton in 1899 that died at birth. La Sagesse died in 1909 after foaling a colt sired by John o'Gaunt, which died shortly after birth. She produced six foals between 1900 and 1908:

- Sagacity, a bay filly, foaled in 1900, sired by St Serf.
- Amitie, bay filly, 1902, by Chaleureux. Third in the 1905 Epsom Oaks.
- Sagamore, colt, 1904, by Sainfoin. Won the Prix Morny in 1906.
- Le Saye, colt, 1905, by Ayrshire (exported to France)
- Bay filly, 1906, by Rock Sand (died young)
- Wise Joan, bay filly, 1908 by John o'Gaunt.

== Pedigree ==
Pedigree of La Sagesse (GB), bay mare, 1892
Sire Wisdom (GB) 1873	Blinkhoolie; 1864	Rataplan	The Baron*
Sire Wisdom (GB) 1873	Blinkhoolie; 1864	Rataplan	Pocahontas*
Sire Wisdom (GB) 1873	Blinkhoolie; 1864	Queen Mary	Gladiator
Sire Wisdom (GB) 1873	Blinkhoolie; 1864	Queen Mary	Plenipotentiary mare
Sire Wisdom (GB) 1873	Aline; 1862	Stockwell	The Baron
Sire Wisdom (GB) 1873	Aline; 1862	Stockwell	Pocahontas*
Sire Wisdom (GB) 1873	Aline; 1862	Jeu d’Esprit	Flatcatcher
Sire Wisdom (GB) 1873	Aline; 1862	Jeu d’Esprit	Extempore
Dam St Mary (GB) 1884	Hermit; 1864	Newminster	Touchstone
Dam St Mary (GB) 1884	Hermit; 1864	Newminster	Beeswing
Dam St Mary (GB) 1884	Hermit; 1864	Seclusion	Tadmor
Dam St Mary (GB) 1884	Hermit; 1864	Seclusion	Miss Sellon
Dam St Mary (GB) 1884	Adelaide; 1866 (Family: 9-h)	Young Melbourne	Melbourne
Dam St Mary (GB) 1884	Adelaide; 1866 (Family: 9-h)	Young Melbourne	Clarissa
Dam St Mary (GB) 1884	Adelaide; 1866 (Family: 9-h)	Teddington mare	Teddington
Dam St Mary (GB) 1884	Adelaide; 1866 (Family: 9-h)	Teddington mare	Maid of Masham
