= Richard Thornton Wilson Jr. =

American banker and businessman

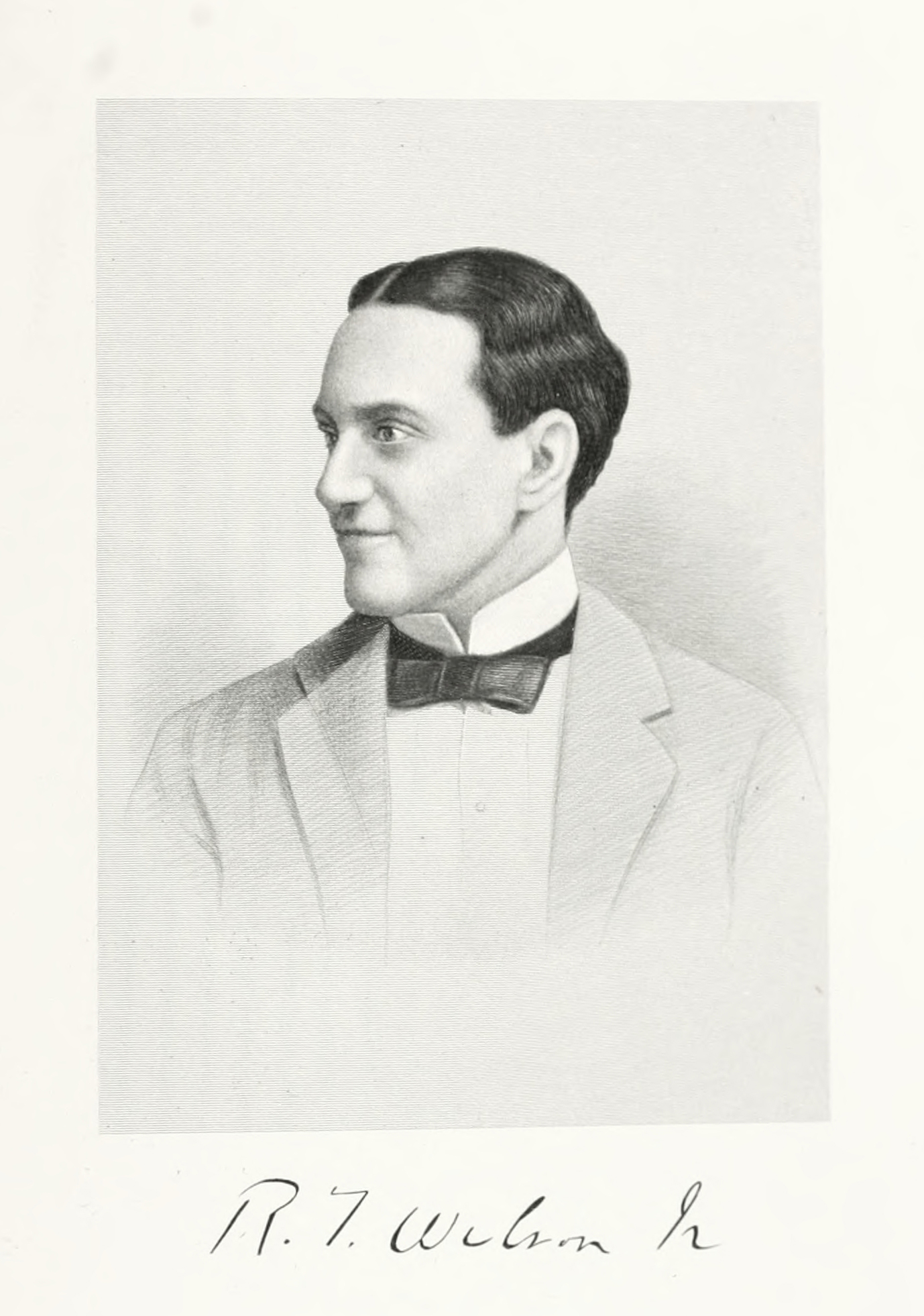
- Born: September 11, 1866; New York City, New York; US
- Died: December 29, 1929 (aged 63); New York City, New York, US
- Burial place: Woodlawn Cemetery
- Education: Columbia University
- Occupations: Investment banker, racetrack owner and president, racehorse owner/breeder
- Employer(s): Saratoga Racing Association; R. T. Wilson & Co.
- Spouse: Marion Steedman Mason (m. 1902)
- Children: Louise Steedman Wilson; Marion Mason Wilson
- Parent(s): Richard Thornton Wilson; Melissa Clementine Johnston
- Relatives: Marshall Orme Wilson (brother); Mary Wilson Goelet (sister); Grace Vanderbilt (sister)

Richard Thornton Wilson Jr. (September 11, 1866 – December 29, 1929) was an American investment banker and capitalist. He was also a prominent figure in thoroughbred horse racing in the early decades of the 20th century.

== Early life ==
Wilson was born in New York City, one of five surviving children of Richard Thornton Wilson Sr. (1829–1910) and Melissa Clementine Johnston (1831–1908). Born in Georgia, his father was a multimillionaire railroad owner and investment banker in New York City who served as the commissary general of the Confederate States of America.

Wilson attended private schools and graduated from Columbia University with a B.A. in 1887. While at Columbia, he joined the Fraternity of Delta Psi (St. Anthony Hall).

== Career ==
Wilson joined R. T. Wilson & Co, a cotton trading and investment firm founded by his father in New York City after the Civil War. He eventually succeeded his father as head of company.

=== Thoroughbred racing ===
In 1896, Richard Wilson Jr. and Harry Payne Whitney teamed up with a group of investors to purchase the Saratoga Race Course, which had fallen into the hands of an undesirable New Jersey brothelkeeper, Gottfried Waldbaum. Wilson served as president of the Saratoga Racing Association for the Improvement of the Breed of Horses, which operated the facility. Wilson is credited with enlarging the facility and improving its appearance. He also welcomed women horse owners, creating the Lady-Owners Handicap.

In addition, Wilson oversaw Belmont Park as a director of the Westchester Racing Association. He was also a steward in the Jockey Club.

In 1896, Wilson hired Thomas J. Healey to manage his racing stable. For three decades, they would win a number of the most important East Coast races, including the Travers Stakes three times, the Preakness Stakes, and the Belmont Stakes. In 1916, he bought Kirklevington Nursery in Lexington, Kentucky, which contained over 500 acres of bluegrass land and was considered "one of the most up-to-date nurseries in the district." Among Wilson's successful racehorses were:

- The Parader – 1901 Preakness Stakes, 1901 Withers Stakes, 1901 Lawrence Realization Handicap
- Olambala – 1909 Latonia Derby, 1910 Brighton Handicap, and 1910 Suburban Handicap
- Campfire – United States leading money winner in 1916 and American Champion Two-Year-Old Colt
- Hannibal – 1918 Saratoga Special Stakes and 1918 Travers Stakes
- Pillory – 1922 Preakness and 1922 Belmont Stakes.
- Wilderness – 1923 Travers Stakes, 1923 Toronto Cup Handicap, and 1925 Shenandoah
- Sunfire – 1928 Ohio Derby and the 1928 & 1929 Toronto Cup Handicap

== Personal life ==
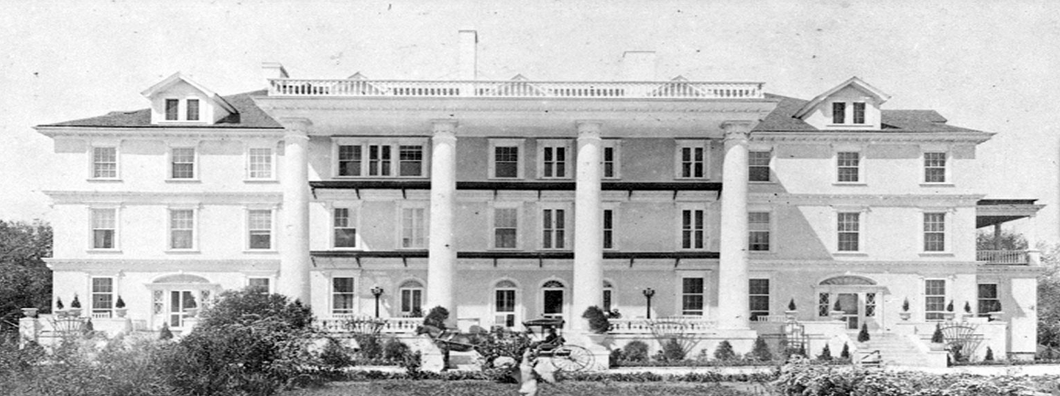
Richard T. Wilson home at Palmetto Bluff SC

On March 11, 1902, Wilson married Marion Steedman Mason (1875–1947) of Boston, daughter of Louisa Blake Steedman and Dr. Amos Lawrence Mason, a cousin of Bishop of Massachusetts William Lawrence. Marion's grandparents included Rear Admiral Charles Steedman of Charleston, South Carolina, captain of the USS Ticonderoga, and Rev. Charles Mason who was the son of the U.S. Senator from New Hampshire, Jeremiah Mason. Together, they had two daughters: Louisa Steedman Wilson (1904–1974) and Marion Mason Wilson (1906–1982).

Their main home include 300 Park Avenue in New York City; with summer homes "Shady Lawn" in Newport, Rhode Island; and "Indian House" in Middletown, Rhode Island. In 1902, Wilson purchased an 18,000 hunting estate at Palmetto Bluff in South Carolina where he raised livestock and champion horses, hunted, road, and farmed. So his wife would also enjoy winters in South, he built a four-story mansion there in 1916. The mansion had a gold-gilded ballroom and a vast library. The home burned on March 2, 1926, and the property was sold shortly afterwards.

Because of Wilson's and his siblings' advantageous marriages, the Wilsons were known in New York and Newport society as the "marrying Wilsons." His sister Grace Graham Wilson married Cornelius "Neily" Vanderbilt III. His older brother, Marshall Orme Wilson, married Caroline Schermerhorn "Carrie" Astor. (Note: Carrie was the youngest daughter of William Backhouse Astor Jr. and Caroline Webster Schermerhorn, leader of the "Four Hundred", and her brother was Colonel John Jacob Astor IV, richest passenger on the RMS Titanic.) His sister Belle married the Sir Michael Henry Herbert, the British Ambassador to the United States and the brother of the Earl of Pembroke. His sister Mary Wilson married New York real estate heir Ogden Goelet.

Wilson was a member of many prominent social clubs, including The Brook, the Knickerbocker Club, and the Union Club of the City of New York. His sports clubs included the Racquet and Tennis Club, the South Side Sportsmen's Club, and the Turf & Field Club at the Belmont Park He was also a member of the Sons of the American Revolution.

After an illness lasting several months, Wilson died of pneumonia at his home in New York City on December 29, 1929, at the age of 63. Wilson's funeral service at St. Bartholomew's Episcopal Church in New York on January 1, 1930, was attended by more than 1,000 people. His Delta Psi fraternity brothers conducted a special ceremony at the funeral. He was interred in the family mausoleum at Woodlawn Cemetery in The Bronx.

His estate was estimated at $10,000,000 at his death.
