= Kirklevington, Lexington =

Kirklevington
- Neighborhood of Lexington, Kentucky
- Interactive map of Kirklevington
- Coordinates: 37.987°N 84.499°W
- Country: United States
- State: Kentucky
- County: Fayette
- City: Lexington

Area
  - Total: .79 sq mi (2.0 km^{2})
  - Water: 0 sq mi (0.0 km^{2})

Population (2000)
  - Total: 6,697
  - Density: 8,477/sq mi (3,273/km^{2})
- Time zone: UTC-5 (Eastern (EST))
  - Summer (DST): UTC-4 (EDT)
- ZIP code: 40517
- Area code: 859

Kirklevington is a neighborhood in southeastern in Lexington, Kentucky, United States. Its boundaries are West Hickman Creek to the west, New Circle Road to the north, Tates Creek Road to the east, and Wilson Downing Road to the south.

== Neighborhood statistics ==
- Population: 6,697
- Land area: 0.79 square miles (2.0 km^{2})
- Population density: 8,477
- Median household income: $30,746
