= The Parader =

American-bred Thoroughbred racehorse

- Sire: Longstreet
- Grandsire: Longfellow
- Dam: Pretence
- Damsire: Plenipo
- Sex: Stallion
- Foaled: 1898
- Country: United States
- Color: Bay
- Breeder: Belle Meade Stud
- Owner: Richard T. Wilson, Jr.
- Trainer: Thomas J. Healey
- Record: not found
- Earnings: US$ not found

Major wins
- Spring Stakes (1900); Broadway Stakes (1901); Lawrence Realization Stakes (1901); Withers Stakes (1901) American Classics wins: Preakness Stakes (1901)

The Parader (1898 – August 1902) was an American Thoroughbred racehorse best known for winning the 1901 Preakness Stakes and finishing second in the Belmont Stakes.

== Background ==
The Parader was a bay horse bred by the Belle Meade Stud of Nashville, Tennessee. He was sired by Longstreet, the leading American racehorse of 1891 out of a mare named Pretence. He was owned by Richard T. Wilson, Jr., President of the Saratoga Race Course.

== Racing career ==
In the Preakness, The Parader was given an indifferent ride, but produced a strong finish to win easily. The Parader also won the Withers Stakes and the Lawrence Realization Stakes. His racing career ended in 1902 due to severe laminitis. He was euthanized in August 1902 due to worsening lameness.
