= Kirkconnel (horse) =

British-bred Thoroughbred racehorse

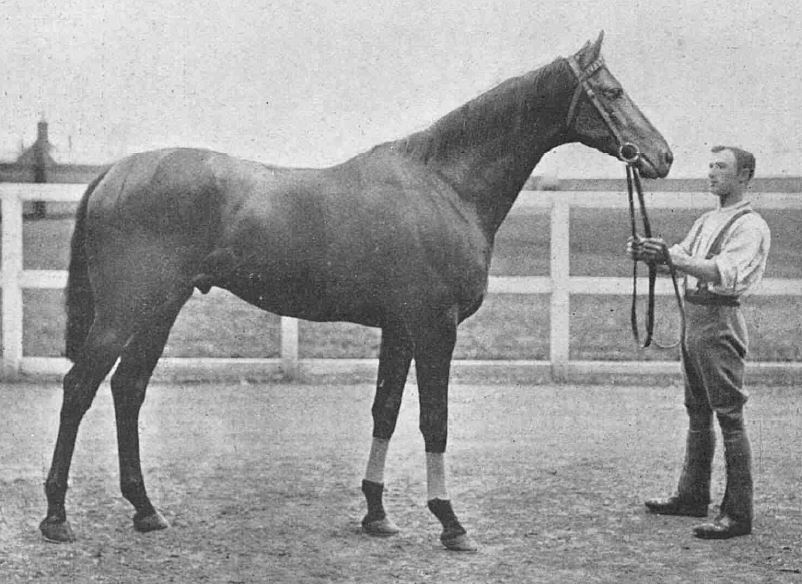
- Kirkconnel in 1896
- Sire: Royal Hampton
- Grandsire: Hampton
- Dam: Sweet Sauce
- Damsire: Blair Athol
- Sex: Stallion
- Foaled: 1892
- Country: United Kingdom
- Colour: Bay
- Breeder: Lady Stamford
- Owner: William C. Cooper; John Blundell Maple
- Trainer: George Blackwell; Percy Peck; J. Day
- Record: 15: 4-2-2
- Earnings: £7,120

Major wins
- Bedford Stakes (1894); July Stakes (1894); Lavant Stakes (1894); 2000 Guineas (1895)

Kirkconnel (1892 – November 1916) was a British Thoroughbred racehorse and sire. He showed very good form as a two-year-old in 1894, winning the Bedford Stakes, July Stakes and Lavant Stakes as well a finishing second in the Dewhurst Stakes and fourth in the Middle Park Plate. In the following year he won the 2000 Guineas and finished a close third in the Epsom Derby but was never as good thereafter, failing to win again and being retired at the end of 1896. He later stood as a breeding stallion in Germany with limited success.

== Background ==
Kirkconnel was a bay horse bred in the United Kingdom by Lady Stamford. As a yearling he was offered for sale and bought for 520 guineas by the Australian sportsman William C. Cooper. The colt was sent into training with George Blackwell in Newmarket, Suffolk.

He was sired by Royal Hampton who won the National Breeders' Produce Stakes and City and Suburban Handicap as well as finishing third in the Epsom Derby. Kirkconnel's dam Sweet Sauce was a descendant of the Warwick Mare, relating her to several major winners including Gladiateur.

== Racing career ==
=== 1894: two-year-old season ===
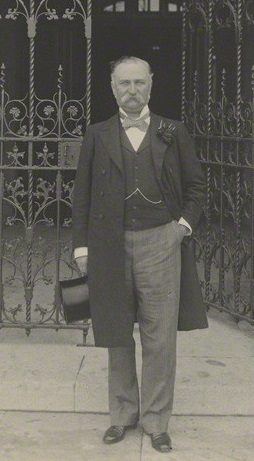
John Blundell Maple, who bought Kirkconnel in 1894

Kirkconnel showed early promise when winning the Bedford Two-Year-Old Stakes at Newmarket Racecourse in May, beating the subsequent 1000 Guineas winner Galeottia, and then running third behind the fillies Kissing Cup and Cheery in the New Stakes at Royal Ascot in June. In the July Stakes at Newmarket on 3 July Kirkconnel started odds-on favourite and was an easy winner, coming home two lengths clear of the filly Golden Blaze. On his next appearance Goodwood Racecourse on 1 August Kikconnel started 5/6 favourite for the Lavant Stakes and won by a length from Curzon. Following this performance he was described as a potential Epsom Derby winner.

On 11 October at Newmarket Kirkconnel started 3/1 favourite for the Middle Park Plate but finished fourth behind Speedwell, Keelson and Raconteur. Two weeks later at the same track Kirconnel finished second to Raconteur in the seven furlong Dewhurst Plate. Kirkconnel ended the season with earnings of £3,120.

At the end of the year the colt returned to the sales ring and was bought for 5,000 guineas by John Blundell Maple. Maple moved the horse to the stable of his private trainer Percy Peck and also made a small change in spelling: the colt had previously been known as Kirkconell, but after his acquisition by Maple he was officially renamed Kirkconnel prompting a comment that he was now owned by "a man who knows how to spell".

=== 1895: three-year-old season ===
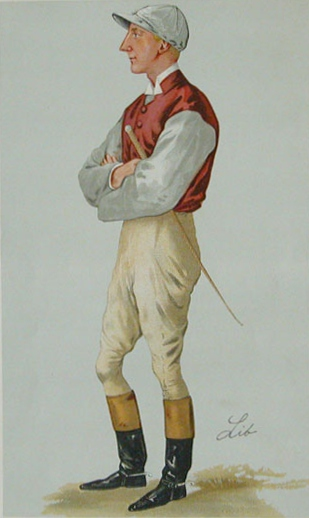
John Watts, who rode Kirkconnel to victory in the 2000 Guineas

In early 1895 J. Day replaced Percy Peck as Maple's private trainer and took over the training of Kirkconnel. On 1 May, Kirkconnel, ridden by John Watts and equipped with blinkers, started at odds of 10/1 in an eight-runner field for the 87th running of the 2000 Guineas over the Rowley Mile. Raconteur started favourite while the best fancied of the other runners were Speedwell, Sir Visto and Laveno. Kirkconnel was restrained towards the rear of the field for most of the way before moving into fourth place behind Sir Visto, Raconteur and Laveno two furlongs from the finish. He produced a strong late run to take the lead well inside the final furlong and won by a length from Laveno, with two lengths back to Sir Visto in third. His winning time of 1:42.4 eualled the track record set by Isinglass in 1893. Although the colt won in "fine style", Watts was not very enthusiastic after the race, commenting "the best-trained horse won. One of the others might do better next time".

The immediate aftermath of the race Kirkconnel was elevated to favouritism for the Derby Stakes and he was expected to confirm his position when he started 5/4 favourite for the ten-furlong Newmarket Stakes on 15 May. He failed to live up to expectations however and finished fourth of the seven runners behind his unfancied stablemate The Owl. In the Derby over one and a half miles at Epsom Racecourse two weeks later Kirkconnel was ridden by Walter Bradford and started at odds of 100/8. He made steady progress to join the leaders two furlongs out and kept on well to finish third of the fifteen runners, beaten three quarters of a length and half a length by Sir Visto and Curzon. On 9 June he was sent to France to contest the Grand Prix de Paris over 3000 metres at Longchamp Racecourse but made no impact and finished unplaced behind the filly Andree. At the end of June he was narrowly beaten when attempting to concede 22 pounds to the four-year-old Pomade Royale in the Clarence and Avondale Stakes Handicap at Sandown Park.

=== 1896: four-year-old season ===
Kirkconnel remained in training as a four-year-old in 1896 but recorded no major victories. On 22 April at Epsom he finished unplaced under 122 pounds in the City and Suburban Handicap after being boxed against the rails for most of the race. In June he ran for the second time in the Clarence and Avondale Handicap over nine furlongs in which he finished unplaced under top weight and early in the following month he came home last of eleven behind St Frusquin in the Princess of Wales's Stakes. At Newmarket in October he ran unplaced behind Persimmon in the Jockey Club Stakes.

== Stud record ==
At the end of his racing career Kirkconnel was bought as a potential breeding stallion by the German Government and exported. He began his stud career in Germany but had little success with the best of his offspring probably being the non-Thoroughbred colt Baron Kiki who finished third in the 1906 Deutsches Derby. Kirkconnel died in November 1916 at the Neu-Colln Stud in Germany.

== Pedigree ==
Pedigree of Kirkconnel (GB), bay colt, 1892
| Sire Royal Hampton (GB) 1882 | Hampton; 1872 | Lord Clifden | Newminster |
| Sire Royal Hampton (GB) 1882 | Hampton; 1872 | Lord Clifden | The Slave* |
| Sire Royal Hampton (GB) 1882 | Hampton; 1872 | Lady Langden | Kettledrum |
| Sire Royal Hampton (GB) 1882 | Hampton; 1872 | Lady Langden | Haricot* |
| Sire Royal Hampton (GB) 1882 | Princess; 1872 | King Tom | Harkaway |
| Sire Royal Hampton (GB) 1882 | Princess; 1872 | King Tom | Pocahontas* |
| Sire Royal Hampton (GB) 1882 | Princess; 1872 | Mrs Lincoln | North Lincoln |
| Sire Royal Hampton (GB) 1882 | Princess; 1872 | Mrs Lincoln | Bay Middleton mare |
| Dam Sweet Sauce (IRE) 1881 | Blair Athol (GB); 1861 | Stockwell | The Baron (IRE) |
| Dam Sweet Sauce (IRE) 1881 | Blair Athol (GB); 1861 | Stockwell | Pocahontas* |
| Dam Sweet Sauce (IRE) 1881 | Blair Athol (GB); 1861 | Blink Bonny | Melbourne* |
| Dam Sweet Sauce (IRE) 1881 | Blair Athol (GB); 1861 | Blink Bonny | Queen Mary* |
| Dam Sweet Sauce (IRE) 1881 | Trieste; 1868 | Plum Pudding | Sweetmeat |
| Dam Sweet Sauce (IRE) 1881 | Trieste; 1868 | Plum Pudding | Foinnualla |
| Dam Sweet Sauce (IRE) 1881 | Trieste; 1868 | Trireme | Iago |
| Dam Sweet Sauce (IRE) 1881 | Trieste; 1868 | Trireme | The Warwick Mare (Family: 5-h) |

* Kirkconnel is inbred 4S x 4D to the mare Pocahontas, meaning that she appears fourth generation on the sire side of his pedigree, and fourth generation on the dam side of his pedigree.

* Kirkconnel is inbred 5S x 4D to the stallion Melbourne, meaning that he appears fifth generation (via The Slave) on the sire side of his pedigree, and fourth generation on the dam side of his pedigree.

* Kirkconnel is inbred 5S x 4D to the mare Queen Mary, meaning that she appears fifth generation (via Haricot) on the sire side of his pedigree, and fourth generation on the dam side of his pedigree.
