= 1901 Kentucky Derby =

Horse race

27th Kentucky Derby
- Kentucky Derby
- Grade I stakes race
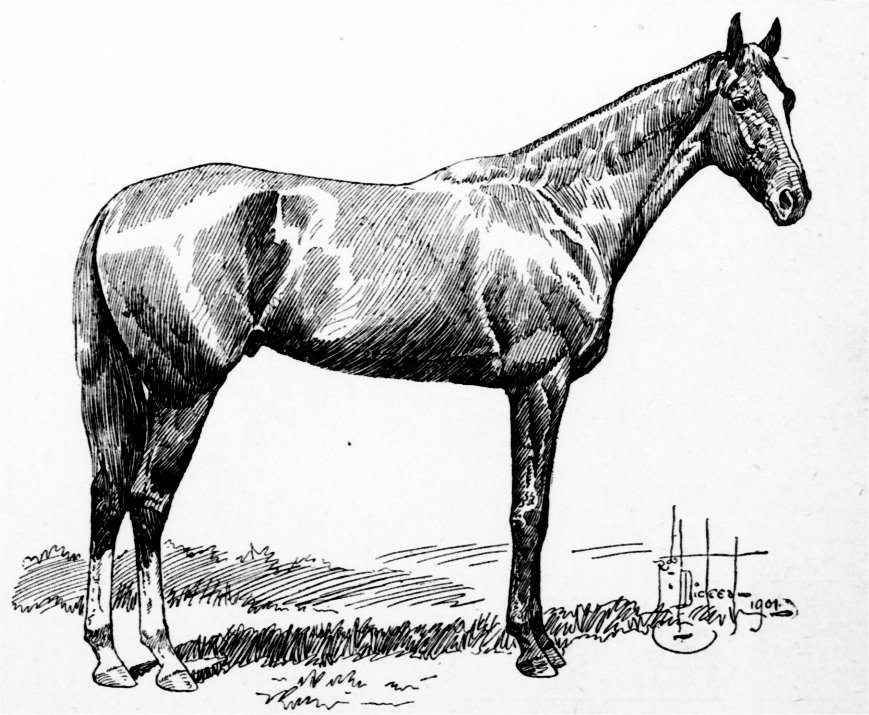
- 1901 Kentucky Derby winner His Eminence
- Location: Churchill Downs
- Date: April 29, 1901
- Winning horse: His Eminence
- Jockey: Jimmy Winkfield
- Trainer: Frank B. Van Meter
- Owner: Frank B. Van Meter
- Surface: Dirt

The 1901 Kentucky Derby was the 27th running of the Kentucky Derby. The race took place on April 29, 1901.

== Full results ==
Finished	Post	Horse	Jockey	Trainer	Owner	Time / behind
1st		His Eminence	Jimmy Winkfield	Frank B. Van Meter	Frank B. Van Meter	2:07.75
2nd		Sannazarro	Winfield O'Connor	William M. Hayes	William M. Hayes	1 1/2
3rd		Driscoll	Jimmy Boland	Woodford Clay	Woodford Clay	2 1/2
4th		Amur	James Dupree		George J. Long	1 1/2
5th		Alard Scheck	Johnny Woods	John F. Schorr	John W. Schorr	5

- Winning breeder: Overton H. Chenault (KY)

== Payout ==
- The winner received a purse of $4,850.
- Second place received $700.
- Third place received $300.
