= Volodyovski =

British-bred Thoroughbred racehorse

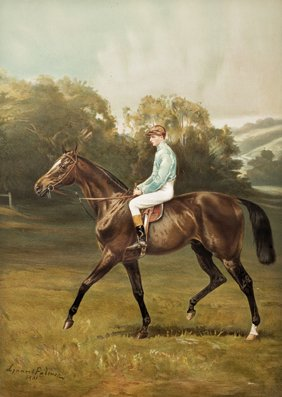
- Volodyovski: Lithograph after painting by Lynwood Palmer (1868–1941)
- Sire: Florizel II
- Dam: La Reine
- Damsire: Rosicrucian
- Sex: Stallion
- Foaled: 1898
- Country: United Kingdom of Great Britain and Ireland
- Colour: Bay
- Breeder: Lady Valerie Meux
- Owner: Lady Valerie Meux; Lord William Beresford (leased); William Collins Whitney (leased)
- Trainer: John Huggins
- Record: 26: 7-7-2
- Earnings: US$66,270 (equivalent)

Major wins
- Windsor Castle Stakes (1900); Epsom Derby (1901)
- Last updated on May 2, 2016

Volodyovski (1898–1917) was a British Thoroughbred racehorse and sire. In a career which lasted from 1900 to 1902, he ran twenty-six times and won seven races. After being one of the leading two-year-olds of 1900, he went on to win The Derby in 1901. His subsequent form was disappointing and he was retired to stud after failing to win in eleven starts as a four-year-old. He made no impact as a stallion.

== Background ==
Volodyovski, a bay horse with a narrow blaze and a white sock on his left back foot, was owned and bred by Lady Valerie Meux who used the name "Mrs. Theobalds" for her racing interests. The colt was leased for racing to Lord William Beresford. Volodyovski was one of the first crop of foals sired by Florizel II, a high class racehorse and a brother to the Derby winners Persimmon and Diamond Jubilee. Volodyovski was sent into training with John Huggins, a Texas-born American based at Newmarket, Suffolk.

== Racing career ==
=== 1900: two-year-old season ===
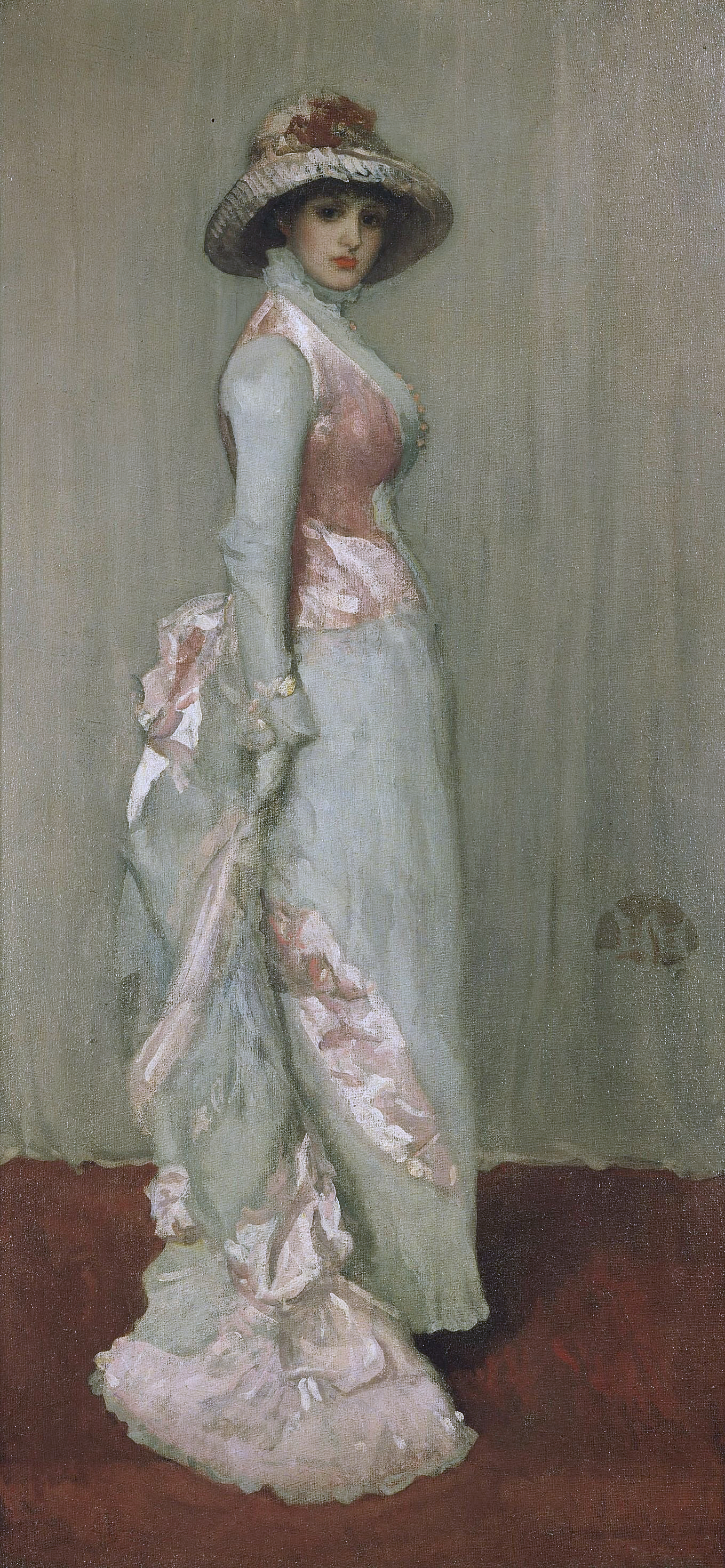
Lady Meux bred and owned Volodyovski

Volodyovski was beaten in his first two races, including an unplaced effort at Kempton on 2 June, but was nevertheless sent to run against top class opposition at Royal Ascot in June. Starting at odds of 100/7, he finished strongly to take second place behind Good Morning in the Coventry Stakes and then won the Windsor Castle Stakes.

Volodyovski then won his next three races, taking the Stud Produce Stakes at Newmarket, showing "great resolution" to beat Princess Melton by a neck and two Rous Memorial Stakes at Goodwood (by three lengths "drawing away") and Newmarket ("in a canter"). At Kempton he finished second in the Imperial Produce Stakes, in which he was attempting to give thirteen pounds to the filly Aïda, who went on to win the 1000 Guineas. On his final race of the season he won the Great Sapling Stakes at Sandown. Volodyovski went into the winter break as 9/2 favourite for the following year's Derby.

In December, Lord William Beresford died, and the ownership of Volodyovski became a matter of dispute: Beresford's widow argued that she should inherit the lease of the colt, whilst Lady Meux wished the arrangement to be terminated.

In early 1901, the ownership of Volodyovski was decided in court where the Judge ruled that the lease was invalidated by Beresford's death. Lady Meux promptly leased the colt to the wealthy American businessman, William Collins Whitney.

=== 1901: three-year-old season ===
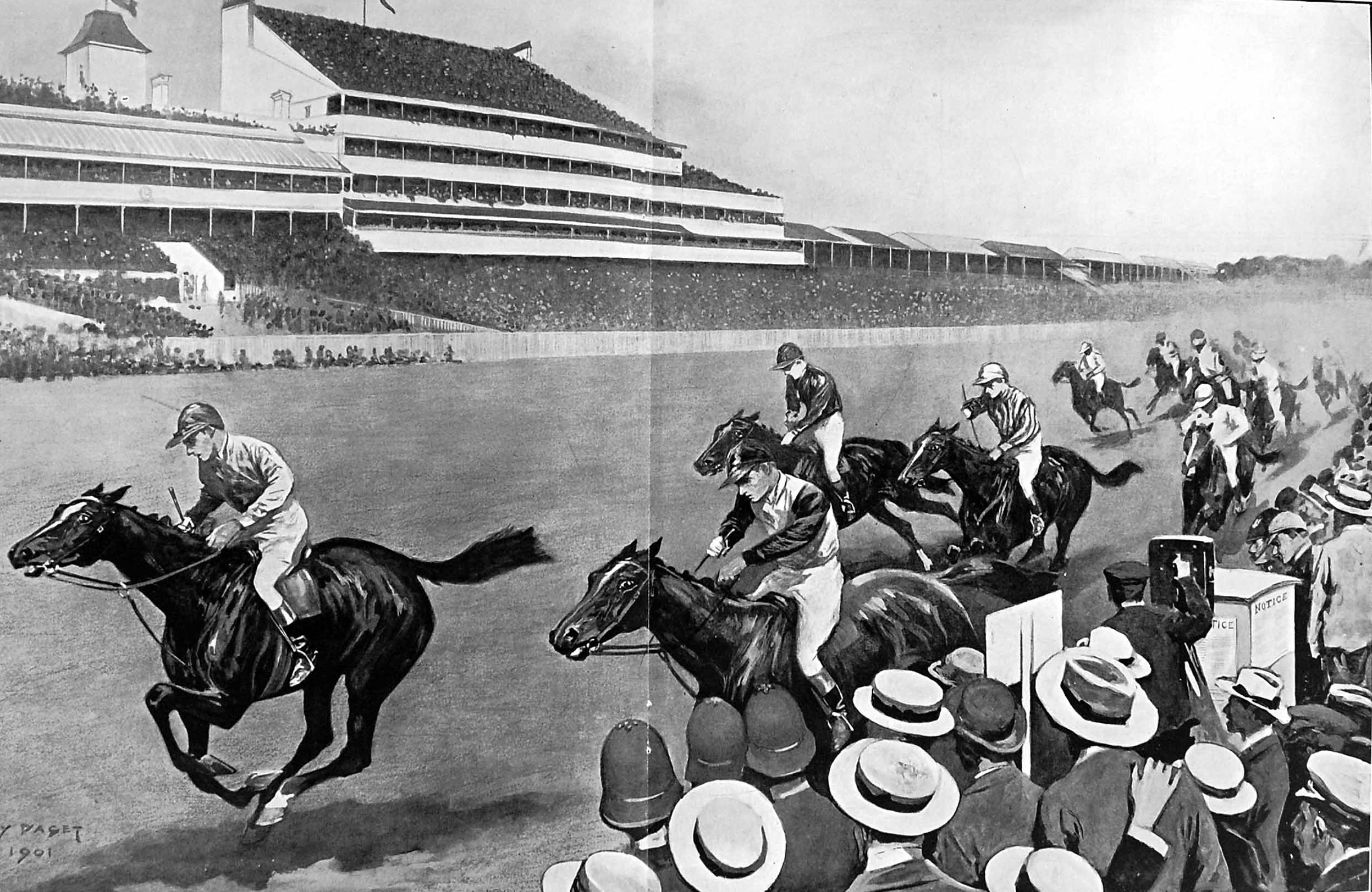
Volodyovski wins the 1901 Derby. Etching by Sidney Paget in "The Sphere"

Volodyovski had not been entered in the 2000 Guineas and his early preparation was not hurried by Huggins. He finished third, looking "palpably unfit" on his seasonal debut in a Biennial Stakes at Newmarket in April. By this time he had acquired the Anglicized nickname "Bottle o' Whisky" from bookmakers and members of the public who struggled with the pronunciation of the colt's name.

At Epsom on 5 June, Volodyovski started the 5/2 favourite for the Derby in a field of twenty-five runners. Ridden by the American jockey Lester Reiff, Volodyovski was held up in the early stages and was not among the front-runners as the outsider Olympian led the field into the straight. In the final quarter mile Reiff made his challenge and Volodyovski "dashed to the front". In the closing stages he was challenged by William the Third but after briefly looking to be in trouble when he was startled by the noise of the crowd, he pulled away before being eased down in the final strides to win by three quarters of a length. The winning time of 2:40.8 was a new race record. Following his win, William Whitney offered to buy a drink (a "Huggins Punch") for every spectator at Gravesend Race Track, which proved expensive as his offer was taken up by 8,000 patrons. Whitney donated his winnings from the Volodyovski's Derby win to the Jockey Club benevolent fund.

In his first start after winning the Derby, Volodyovski faced William the Third again in the Lennox Stakes at Hurst Park Racecourse on 24 August. He was beaten a head by the Derby runner-up, to whom he was conceding three pounds. In the St Leger at Doncaster in September Volodyovski finished second, beaten a head by Doricles in a rough and controversial race. It appeared that several of the English jockeys had connived to prevent Reiff from winning the race, but an objection lodged Volodyovski's connections was rejected by the stewards. a counter-accusation was made that Reiff had "held" the colt, deliberately preventing him from winning. In October, Volodyovski won the Sandown Foal Stakes and then ran against older horses for the first time in the Kempton Park Stakes. He proved to be the best of the three-year-olds, beating Doricles and William the Third, but finished third behind the four-year-olds Epsom Lad and Santoi.

=== 1902: four-year-old season ===
Volodyovski was kept in training as a four-year-old in 1901, but failed to reproduce his earlier form, losing all eleven of his races. He began his season by finishing third in the Lincolnshire Handicap. He finished unplaced in the Great Jubilee Handicap at Kempton and then finished second to Osbech in the Coronation Cup, by which time he had become a confirmed roarer. In September Volodyovski finished second in the Prince Edward Handicap, conceding 36 pounds to the winner and was the beaten favourite in the Duke of York Stakes at Kempton in October.

== Assessment ==
In their book A Century of Champions, John Randall and Tony Morris rated Volodyovski an "average" Derby winner.

As a two-year-old, Volodyovski won £9,882 in prize money, placing him eighth in that year's list of highest earners.

== Stud record ==
Volodyovski was retired to stand at stud at Waltham Abbey at a fee of 45 guineas. He was later moved to Lady Meux's establishment at Theobalds Park but made no impact as a stallion.

Lady Meux died in 1910 and ordered in her will that Volodyovski should be shot when he "ceased to be of service" to prevent his suffering at the hands of new owners or due to the infirmities of old age. He was exported to France in 1911 and died in 1917 at the stud farm of M.H. Remy.

== Pedigree ==
Pedigree of Volodyovski (GB), bay stallion, 1898
Sire Florizel II (GB) 1891	St Simon (GB); 1881	Galopin	Vedette
Sire Florizel II (GB) 1891	St Simon (GB); 1881	Galopin	Flying Duchess
Sire Florizel II (GB) 1891	St Simon (GB); 1881	St Angela	King Tom^
Sire Florizel II (GB) 1891	St Simon (GB); 1881	St Angela	Adeline^
Sire Florizel II (GB) 1891	Perdita II (GB); 1881	Hampton	Lord Clifden
Sire Florizel II (GB) 1891	Perdita II (GB); 1881	Hampton	Lady Langden
Sire Florizel II (GB) 1891	Perdita II (GB); 1881	Hermione	Young Melbourne
Sire Florizel II (GB) 1891	Perdita II (GB); 1881	Hermione	La Belle Helene
Dam La Reine (GB) 1884	Rosicrucian (GB); 1865	Beadsman	Weatherbit
Dam La Reine (GB) 1884	Rosicrucian (GB); 1865	Beadsman	Mendicant
Dam La Reine (GB) 1884	Rosicrucian (GB); 1865	Madame Eglentine	Cowl
Dam La Reine (GB) 1884	Rosicrucian (GB); 1865	Madame Eglentine	Diversion
Dam La Reine (GB) 1884	Hue and Cry (GB); 1865	Wild Dayrell	Ion
Dam La Reine (GB) 1884	Hue and Cry (GB); 1865	Wild Dayrell	Ellen Middleton
Dam La Reine (GB) 1884	Hue and Cry (GB); 1865	The Golden Horn	Harkaway
Dam La Reine (GB) 1884	Hue and Cry (GB); 1865	The Golden Horn	Little Red Rover mare (Family: 14-d)

*^ Volodyovski is inbred 5S x 4D to the stallion Harkaway, meaning that he appears fifth generation (via King Tom)^ on the sire side of his pedigree and fourth generation on the dam side of his pedigree.

*^ Volodyovski is inbred 5S x 4D to the stallion Ion, meaning that he appears fifth generation (via Adeline)^ on the sire side of his pedigree and fourth generation on the dam side of his pedigree.
