= Pharos (horse) =

British-bred Thoroughbred racehorse

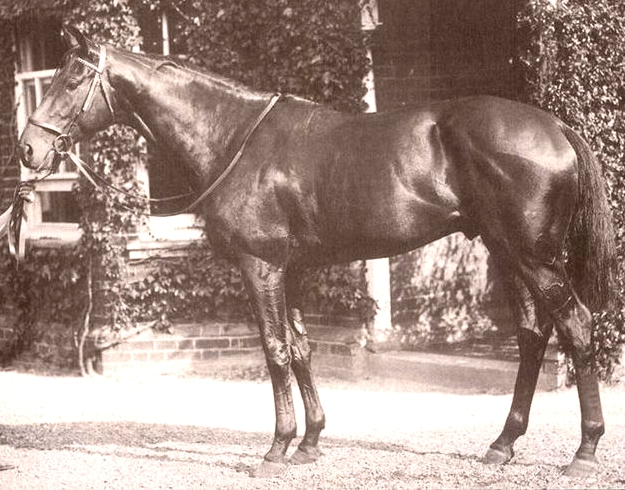
- Sire: Phalaris
- Grandsire: Polymelus
- Dam: Scapa Flow
- Damsire: Chaucer
- Sex: Stallion
- Foaled: 4 April 1920
- Died: 30 April 1937 (aged 17)
- Country: Great Britain
- Colour: Bay or brown
- Breeder: Earl of Derby
- Owner: Edward Stanley, 17th Earl of Derby
- Trainer: George Lambton
- Record: 30: 14–5–6
- Earnings: £15,694

Major wins
- Bedford Stakes (1922); Chesham Stakes (1920); Mersey Stakes (1922); Lambton Stakes (1920); Hurst Park Great Two-Year-Old Stakes (1920); Hastings Stakes (1923); March Stakes (1923); Royal Stakes (1923); Liverpool Summer Cup (1924); North Sea Stakes (1924); Champion Stakes (1924); Duke of York Handicap (1924, 1925)

Awards
- Leading sire in Great Britain & Ireland (1931); Leading sire in France (1939)
- Last updated on 11 January 2010

Pharos (4 April 1920 – 30 April 1937) was a British bred thoroughbred racehorse and a leading sire in Great Britain and Ireland.

== Pedigree ==
Bred and raced by Edward Stanley, 17th Earl of Derby, he was a brother to the stakeswinners, Fair Isle (1927) and Fairway (1925) who won 31 races and £71,635 between them. They were by the successful sire, Phalaris, their dam the staying mare, Scapa Flow by Chaucer. Pharos's maximum distance was approximately 1¼ miles and Fairway could stay much further and was altogether a better racehorse. Both Pharos and Fairway were outstanding successes at stud where they both sired classic winners of a high standard. However, Pharos has proved more influential in the long run and now stands four-square on the pre-eminent sire line in world racing.

== Racing record ==
Pharos won six of his nine starts at age two and three of his nine starts at age three when he also ran second to Papyrus in the 1923 Epsom Derby. Racing at age four, Pharos won four of seven starts, notably beating Prix de l'Arc de Triomphe winner Parth in the ten furlong Champion Stakes at Newmarket Racecourse. Racing at age five, Pharos did not win in his first four starts but, in the last race of his career, won his second consecutive edition of the Duke of York Handicap by six lengths.

== Stud record ==
Retired to stud duty having won fourteen of his thirty career starts, Pharos first stood at Woodland Stud in Newmarket for the 1926 season. In 1928 he was sent to stand at Haras d'Ouilly in France where he remained until his death in 1937. Pharos was the leading sire in Britain and Ireland in 1931 and the leading sire in France in 1938.

Pharos sired 11 high class stallions including Pharis, an undefeated galloper whose wins included the 1939 Prix du Jockey Club and the Grand Prix de Paris and who was the leading sire in France in 1944. However, by far his most important son was the undefeated Nearco, described by Thoroughbred Heritage as "one of the greatest racehorses of the Twentieth Century" and "one of the most important sires of the century".

Pharos sired the winners of 181 races worth £152,157.

== Pedigree ==
Pedigree of Pharos, brown stallion, 1920
Sire Phalaris	Polymelus	Cyllene	Bona Vista
Sire Phalaris	Polymelus	Cyllene	Arcadia
Sire Phalaris	Polymelus	Maid Marian	Hampton
Sire Phalaris	Polymelus	Maid Marian	Quiver
Sire Phalaris	Bromus	Sainfoain	Springfield
Sire Phalaris	Bromus	Sainfoain	Sanda
Sire Phalaris	Bromus	Cheery	St. Simon
Sire Phalaris	Bromus	Cheery	Sunrise
Dam Scapa Flow	Chaucer	St. Simon	Galopin
Dam Scapa Flow	Chaucer	St. Simon	St. Angela
Dam Scapa Flow	Chaucer	Canterbury Pilgrim	Tristan
Dam Scapa Flow	Chaucer	Canterbury Pilgrim	Pilgrimage
Dam Scapa Flow	Anchora	Love Wisely	Wisdom
Dam Scapa Flow	Anchora	Love Wisely	Lovelorn
Dam Scapa Flow	Anchora	Eryholme	Hazlehatch
Dam Scapa Flow	Anchora	Eryholme	Ayrsmoss (family: 13-e)

== See also ==
- List of Undefeated horses
