= Hughley, Shropshire =

Village in Shropshire, England

Coordinates: 52.577°N 2.642°W

Hughley
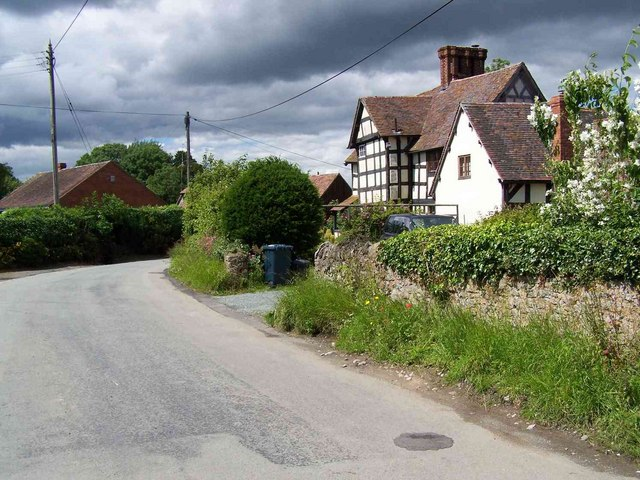
- Hughley, approaching from the south-east

- Location within Shropshire
- OS grid reference: SO565979
- Civil parish: Hughley
- Unitary authority: Shropshire
- Ceremonial county: Shropshire
- Region: West Midlands
- Country: England
- Sovereign state: United Kingdom
- Post town: SHREWSBURY
- Postcode district: SY5
- Dialling code: 01746
- Police: West Mercia
- Fire: Shropshire
- Ambulance: West Midlands
- UK Parliament: Shrewsbury and Atcham

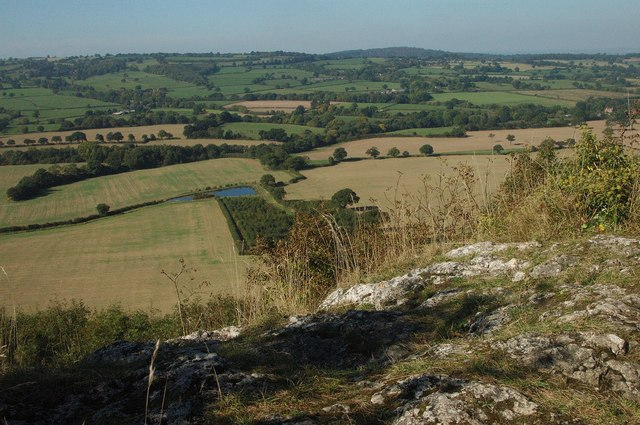
View north-west from Ippikin's Rock

Hughley (grid reference SO565979) is a village and civil parish in Shropshire, England, about 5 miles (8 km) south-west of Much Wenlock.

It lies in the south Shropshire Hills, an Area of Outstanding Natural Beauty. The limestone escarpment Wenlock Edge is about 1 mile (1.6 km) south-east, and the parish lies on Wenlock Shale. Hughley Brook, which runs north-east along the western edge of the village, is the parish border with Church Preen (to the west of Hughley) and Kenley (to the north).

== History ==
The village was known in medieval times as Legh, Leye or Lee, and the lords of the manor took its name. They are thought to be descendants of Aelfric, father of Eadric of Wenlock who was probably Eadric the Wild, an important figure at the time of the Norman Conquest. It is thought that the village acquired its distinguishing name by the end of the 13th century, after Hugh of Lee, who became lord of the manor in 1225 and died between 1271 and 1283.

In the late 18th century most houses in Hughley were still timber-framed; later, houses were built or rebuilt with locally made brick. The resulting appearance of the village was distinct from the stone-built houses of upland settlements in the area. It is thought the parish has never had a pub.

== Church of St John the Baptist ==
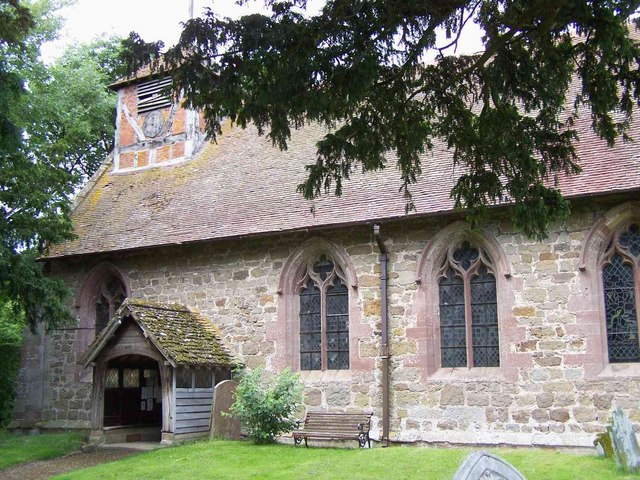
Church of St John the Baptist, Hughley.

The church, a Grade I listed building, was originally a chapel in the parish of Holy Trinity, Much Wenlock, and in the late 16th century it became a parish church in its own right.

It was built in the 13th century, of limestone rubble with sandstone ashlar dressings. The nave and chancel are structurally undivided. Two lancet windows in the north of the nave are from this period. There was modification in the 14th century, when all the other windows were built. Inside, there is a late-medieval richly decorated rood screen.

There is a timber-framed belfry built about 1700. New pews were installed in 1842. The church was restored in the 1870s by Richard Norman Shaw; this included creating the trussed rafter roof and restoring the west window. The octagonal clock on the belfry was given by Orlando Bridgeman, 3rd Earl of Bradford after his horse Sir Hugo won the Derby in 1892. There was restoration about 1900 which included reflooring the nave.

Poem # 61 of Housman's collection A Shropshire Lad (1896) bears the title The Vane on Hughley Steeple, however the poet admitted in a letter to his brother that the church does not have much of a steeple, the square bell-cote tower having a simple pyramidal roof, and that he had another village's church in mind when describing the steeple in the poem.

== Legends ==
=== Ippikin's Rock ===
On the parish boundary at Wenlock Edge is a rock outcrop, known as Ippikin's Rock, over a cave. There is a legend that Ippikin was a knight of the 13th century, leader of a band of robbers whose base was the cave, and were finally trapped there by falling rock.

=== Major's Leap ===
Another rock in the parish on the side of Wenlock Edge is Major's Leap. Major Thomas Smallman was a Royalist in the English Civil War who was forced to flee from Cromwell’s approaching troops. After managing to escape on horseback, Major Smallman took a do-or-die plunge down a steep slope under the rock. His horse was killed but Smallman survived thanks to an apple tree breaking his fall. Since then the ghosts of Smallman and his horse are said to appear in this area now known as Major’s Leap and also seen at his old home Wilderhope Manor.

== See also ==
- Listed buildings in Hughley, Shropshire
