= Parth (horse) =

British-bred Thoroughbred racehorse

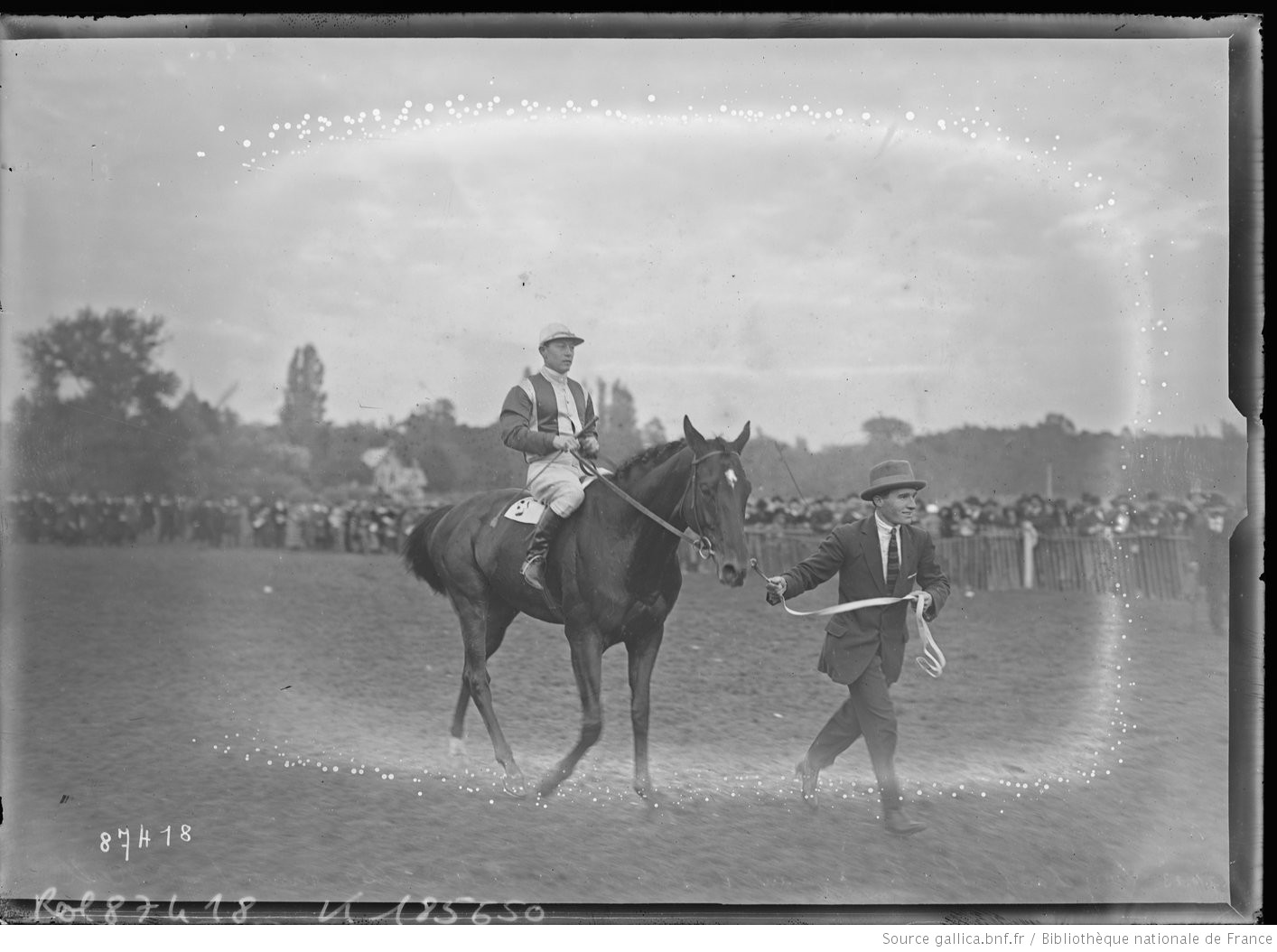
- Oct 7, 1923, at Longchamp
- Sire: Polymelus
- Grandsire: Cyllene
- Dam: Willia
- Damsire: William the Third
- Sex: Stallion
- Foaled: 1920
- Country: United Kingdom
- Colour: Bay
- Owner: Mathradas Goculdas; A. Kingsley Macomber
- Trainer: James H. Crawford

Major wins
- Greenham Stakes (1923); Prix de l'Arc de Triomphe (1923); Great Jubilee Handicap (1924); Churchill Stakes (1924)

Parth (foaled 1920) was a British-trained Thoroughbred racehorse best known for winning the 1923 Prix de l'Arc de Triomphe. The horse following the end of his career was sold by Mr. Goculdas to Sir Victor Sassoon in a deal which transferred all of Mr. Goculdas's bloodstock interests to Sir Victor Sassoon.

== Background ==
Parth was a bay horse sired by Polymelus, the five-time Leading sire in Great Britain & Ireland. His dam was Willia, a daughter of the 1902 Ascot Gold Cup winner William the Third. As a descendant of the mare Grand Duchess, Parth was a member of the same Thoroughbred family which produced Manna, Blushing Groom and Mill Reef.

Parth was first owned by the Indian textile magnate Mathradas Goculdas and later sold for 20,000 guineas to A. Kingsley Macomber, an American who maintained a sizeable racing operation in Europe and who had won the 1918 Preakness Stakes with War Cloud. The colt was trained at Ogbourne in Wiltshire, England by James H. Crawford.

== Racing career ==
In 1923, Parth contested The Derby having previously won the Greenham Plate at Newbury: in both races he was ridden by the Australian jockey A. C. Walker. According to press reports, he was left twenty lengths behind the leaders at the start of the Derby, before staying on strongly in the straight to finish third behind Papyrus and Pharos. He later finished fourth in the St. Leger Stakes to the filly Tranquil. In October, Parth was sent to Paris to contest the fourth running of the Prix de l'Arc de Triomphe a race which, while an important international test, had not yet attained the status of Europe's premier weight-for-age contest. After arriving in France at Boulogne, Parth spent thirty hours travelling by train to Paris. Ridden by Frank O'Neill, Parth started at odds of 35/4 and won by a neck from Massine, a French-trained three-year-old who went on to win the race (as well as the Ascot Gold Cup) in 1924.

Racing at age four, Parth's wins included the Great Jubilee Handicap at Kempton Park Racecourse in May in which he defeated Verdict (winner of the Cambridgeshire Handicap and the Coronation Cup) by a short head. In Autumn he ran second to Pharos in the Champion Stakes at Newmarket and third behind the filly Teresina and Papyrus in the Jockey Club Stakes. Parth injured a tendon during the running for the City and Suburban Handicap.

== Pedigree ==
Pedigree of Parth (GB), bay stallion, 1920
Sire Polymelus (GB) 1902	Cyllene; 1895	Bona Vista	Bend Or
Sire Polymelus (GB) 1902	Cyllene; 1895	Bona Vista	Vista
Sire Polymelus (GB) 1902	Cyllene; 1895	Arcadia	Isonomy
Sire Polymelus (GB) 1902	Cyllene; 1895	Arcadia	Distant Shore
Sire Polymelus (GB) 1902	Maid Marian; 1886	Hampton*	Lord Clifden
Sire Polymelus (GB) 1902	Maid Marian; 1886	Hampton*	Lady Langden
Sire Polymelus (GB) 1902	Maid Marian; 1886	Quiver	Toxophilite
Sire Polymelus (GB) 1902	Maid Marian; 1886	Quiver	Young Melbourne mare
Dam Willia (GB) 1908	William the Third; 1898	St. Simon	Galopin
Dam Willia (GB) 1908	William the Third; 1898	St. Simon	St. Angela
Dam Willia (GB) 1908	William the Third; 1898	Gravity	Wisdom
Dam Willia (GB) 1908	William the Third; 1898	Gravity	Enigma
Dam Willia (GB) 1908	Gadfly; 1896	Hampton*	Lord Clifden
Dam Willia (GB) 1908	Gadfly; 1896	Hampton*	Lady Langden
Dam Willia (GB) 1908	Gadfly; 1896	Merry Duchess	Speculum
Dam Willia (GB) 1908	Gadfly; 1896	Merry Duchess	Grand Duchess (Family:22)

- Parth was inbred 3 × 3 to Hampton, meaning that this stallion appears twice in the third generation of his pedigree.
