= Napa Valley Vine Trail =

The Napa Valley Vine Trail is a 47-mile walking and biking paved trail connecting Napa County, California from the Vallejo Ferry Terminal in Solano County to Calistoga. A grass-roots nonprofit called the Napa Valley Vine Trail Coalition funds and maintains the trail and fosters a sense of community through implementing artwork and educational elements along the path. The Napa Greenway Feasibility Study was commissioned by the Napa Valley Transportation Authority (NVTA) in 2007 to explore an active transportation system for the Valley. The first section of the trail opened in Yountville in 2012, and has been expanding since then.

== History ==
The Napa Valley Vine Trail Coalition was formed on September 19, 2008, after the Napa Greenway Feasibility Study's investigation was complete. The Coalition comprises thirty two public and private organizations across public agencies and agricultural, commercial, environmental and community interest groups.

The trail is funded by Napa County's residential population and serves an additional 3.7 million tourists annually. The design costs of the Vine Trail are 50% covered by the Coalition and 50% covered by the local jurisdictions through which the trail runs. At the time of its creation in 2013, the total cost to build the trail was estimated at $45 million with a $9 million contingency in the Napa Valley Vine Trail Project Plan. The Project Plan also stated that local matching funds of $12.5 million would be provided by the Coalition and $32 million would be solicited in federal, state, and local funds. Philanthropic contributions have supported the environmental review process for over ten miles of the Vine Trail and serve as matching funds for a $2.5 million Transportation, Community, and System Preservation (TCSP) grant. The Coalition secured over $2.5 million in pledges and contributions from over 350 individual and corporate donors following the commission of the Vine Trail, even before formal fundraising efforts began. Local communities and Napa County also approved Measure T in 2012, a 1/2-cent sales tax expected to generate $500 million over a 25-year period to aid construction and maintenance of streets, roads, and trails in Napa County, starting in 2018.

The Vine Trail is estimated to be completed by 2028, with the Yountville to St. Helena section being the final construction project spanning 10 miles.

== Trail features ==
The Vine Trail route is divided into 10 sections, each named for the city or vineyard AVA (American Viticultural Area) the trail passes through. These sections, north to south, include Calistoga, St. Helena, Rutherford, Oakville, Yountville, Oak Knoll, City of Napa, Los Carneros, American Canyon, and Vallejo. The proposed amenities included across the Vine Trail are 20 trail head shelters,12 rest stops, 9 art installations, three wellness walking courses, 37 interpretive signs, 40 benches, 37 bike racks, 48 mile markers, and 20 AVA boundary signs.

People of all ages and abilities, including those using wheelchairs, are able to use the accessible Vine Trail for biking, walking, running, or any other form of transportive activity. The Vine Trail is paved and level with a grade of about 2 percent.

In 2022, the gap between Vallejo and the City of American Canyon on the southern end of the route added another 12 miles. In 2024, the trail added a new 8-mile segment on the northern end of the route, stretching from Calistoga to St. Helena. This new addition has risen the cost of the trail's construction by $420,000, making the overall cost $16.96 million. By the project’s estimated completion in 2028, the Vine Trail will connect Napa and Solano counties, five cities and one town, and will link to two expansive regional projects, the Bay Area Ridge Trail and the San Francisco Bay Trail.

== Environmental and community impact ==
The Vine Trail's 2023-2024 Impact Report found that 500,000 people use the Vine Trail annually, with 70% of those users being locals. The Vine Trail has had a positive impact on the local economy, with tourists staying on average two nights longer in Napa Valley when they include the Vine Trail in their travel itinerary.

The Vine Trail allows for a safer commute to 69 schools for 30,000 students, and allows for 34,000 fewer auto trips annually. With the decrease in auto trips, 100 tons of CO2 are reduced annually. The paths separated from major roads prevent collisions, resulting in a 44% reduction in traffic-related injury & death.

Users of the trail can also find 45 parks within 1 mile of the Vine Trail, encouraging the community to engage in outdoor recreational activities.

== Recognition and awards ==
The Great Wine Capitals Global Network awarded the Napa Valley Vine Trail a 2024 Best Of Wine Tourism Award for its innovative properties and emphasis on visitor experience. Among 11 worldwide regions recognized for wine tourism and 551 applicants, the Vine Trail won representing the San Francisco-Napa Valley U.S. region. The San Francisco Chronicle has also named The Napa Valley Vine Trail a top place to visit in California in 2025.
