= Fred Allsopp =

British jockey

Personal information
- Nickname: The Bumper
- Born: 3 January 1869 Peopleton, Worcestershire
- Died: 4 December 1912 (aged 43) Peopleton, Worcestershire
- Occupation: Jockey

Horse racing career
- Sport: Horse racing
- Career wins: 845

Major racing wins
- Major races Epsom Derby (1892)

Significant horses
- Sir Hugo

Frederick George Allsopp (3 January 1869 – 1912) was a British Derby-winning jockey.

Allsopp was born in Peopleton, Worcestershire, on 3 January 1869. He spent five years as an apprentice with trainer James Humphreys in Lambourn, and stayed there for another three years subsequently. He was tall and thin, with sharp features and heavy, black eyebrows, and was always in demand due to his ability to ride at a boy's weight, despite his height.

His first major victory was on 100/30 joint favourite El Caisier in the 1886 Ebor at York, riding at 6st 7lbs.

A few years later he won the 1891 Goodwood Stakes on White Feather. That same year, on 14 November, he had his licence temporarily cancelled for having crossed another horse in a Nursery Handicap at Blankney Races, Lincolnshire. His reputation for this "cross-riding" earned him the nickname "The Bumper".

The highlight of his career came in the 1892 Derby which he won on Sir Hugo. The victory was considered a fluke by some. George Barrett on 11/10 favourite La Fleche was a fast-finishing second but opinion was that he had given the filly a terrible ride. He also won that season's Lincoln on Clarence.

In 1894 he took the Goodwood Stakes again on Spindle Leg.

By 1895, he was among the leading five riders in the jockeys' table, along with Morny Cannon, Sam Loates, Tommy Loates and Walter Bradford, eventually finishing 3rd with 106 winners, behind Cannon. He had, in fact, ridden more races than any other jockey that year – 835, compared to Cannon's 721. Among the races he won that year was the Cambridgeshire Handicap on Marco.

In 1896, he was third on Earwig in the Derby, behind Persimmon, but won a third Goodwood Stakes on Carlton Grange as well as the Manchester Cup on The Docker, and was again third in the jockeys' championship.

In 1897 won the Royal Hunt Cup on Knight of the Thistle. and the Great Metropolitan Stakes on Soliman. He won that same race again on King's Messenger in 1900.

In total in his career, he rode 845 winners, and held a jockey's licence until the end of 1904, although his final race was on 10 October 1900. He died at his Peopleton home on 4 December 1912 after a long illness, aged 43.

== Major wins ==
(United Kingdom) Great Britain

- Epsom Derby – Sir Hugo (1892)

== Bibliography ==
- Mortimer, Roger; Onslow, Richard; Willett, Peter (1978). Biographical Encyclopedia of British Flat Racing. Macdonald and Jane’s. ISBN 0-354-08536-0.
- Tanner, Michael; Cranham, Gerry (1992). Great Jockeys of the Flat. Enfield, Middlesex: Guinness Publishing. ISBN 0-85112-989-7.
