= Church Preen =

Hamlet and civil parish in Shropshire, England

Coordinates: 52.580°N 2.677°W

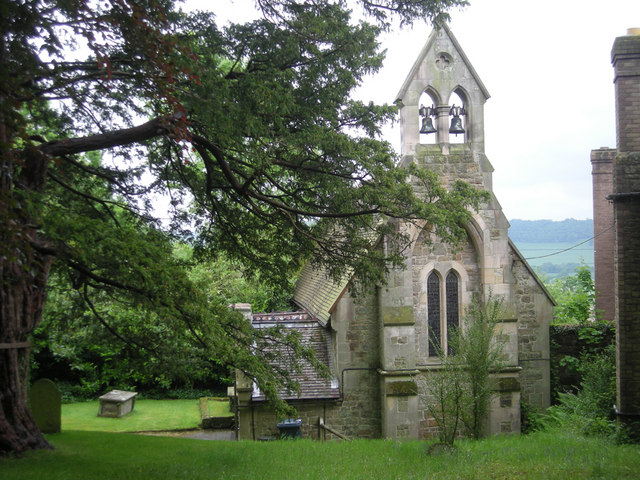
- The church of St John the Baptist, Church Preen

- Location within Shropshire
- Population: 73
- OS grid reference: SO541982
  - London: 131.57 mi (211.74 km)
- Civil parish: Church Preen
- Unitary authority: Shropshire
- Ceremonial county: Shropshire
- Region: West Midlands
- Country: England
- Sovereign state: United Kingdom
- Post town: CHURCH STRETTON
- Postcode district: SY6
- Dialling code: 01694
- Police: West Mercia
- Fire: Shropshire
- Ambulance: West Midlands
- UK Parliament: South Shropshire

Church Preen is a dispersed hamlet and small civil parish in central Shropshire, England. The county town of Shropshire is Shrewsbury, which is located to the North and by road is 12 miles.

It is located near Plaish, Kenley and Hughley. The nearest towns are Much Wenlock and Church Stretton; both are approximately 7 miles by road. The nearest city is Birmingham, which is located to the East of Church Preen. It is approximately 49 miles by road and takes just over 1 hour to get there. The A49 runs 6 miles to the West and the nearest train station is at Church Stretton, which is 7.4 miles away.

Church Preen has a total of 30 different households, 6 of which are semi-detached and the others are groups of buildings, mostly farms. Located in the centre of the hamlet is St. John the Baptist parish church, a separate graveyard, a post box, telephone box, a pump cottage, Preen Manor, a well, Church Preen pre-school, Church Preen (disused) quarry and just on the outskirts is Church Preen Primary School. The primary employment sectors are education and agriculture.

The primary school at Church Preen, called Church Preen Primary School, serves the local, rural communities. There are currently around 40 pupils at the school spread over 3 classes from the ages of 5 to 11. More can be read on the school in the education section. There is also a preschool called Church Preen Preschool. It is held at The Village Hall, Church Preen and children from 2 up to 5 years old are welcome.

== Government ==
Church Preen is part of the South Shropshire parliamentary constituency. Stewart Anderson is the MP.

== Geography ==
The surrounding area around the hamlet is generally privately owned farmland. The forests and woodlands in the area are both deciduous and coniferous trees. Church Preen lies between 220 and 240 metres above sea level. The nearest rivers are the River Corve (approximately 4.14 miles away as the crow flies) and the River Severn where it flows passed Cressage about 4.94 miles away.

Church Stretton Fault Line runs just to the North of the hamlet, which has led to several different rock types sprawling over Shropshire. Church Preen lies on the edge of Marine Silurian, which is from the Silurian period around 409-439 million years ago and the Ordovician period around 443–488 million years ago. The huge variety of different rock types in Shropshire has played a big part in what the land shape looks like today.

Church Preen is set upon a rise up to the ridge hill, which is covered by deciduous woodland called Netherwood Coppice. There are many hills in the surrounding area including the Lawley, which elevates to 217 metres (712 feet) and Caer Caradoc at 459 metres (1,506 feet). They are within 3.47 miles (5.58 km) of the hamlet.

== Landmarks ==
Church Preen Manor sits adjacent to the church. It lies on an old Cluniac monastery, which was thought to have been built in 1159, overlooking Wenlock Edge. The remains of which have been uncovered and lie under a yew tree in the gardens. The other monastic buildings were destroyed in 1850 by Norman Shaw to make way for the new manor, but this fell into disrepair in World War I until it was restored again. Presently, there are 6 acres of garden with 18 outdoor rooms leading into one another. Mrs Ann Trevor-Jones has developed the gardens for 30 years with her husband. There is a cafe and plants are also sold. Opening and closing times as well as the small admission fee can be found on the website.

There is also a disused quarry located 0.3 miles to the South of the hamlet in a field owned by the New Holding Farm.

== Transport ==
Apart from access by car via the country roads running through Church Preen, there is the A49, which runs approximately 5.35 miles (8.61 km) to the West of the hamlet. To the East there is the A458 near Harley, which by road is approximately 4.74 miles (7.63 km) away. The nearest station as said before is Church Stretton Station, which by road is roughly 7.31 miles (11.76 km). Birmingham Airport is the nearest international airport, which by road is just less than 50 miles away.

== Education ==
Church Preen Primary School is the only school in the hamlet. As said in the introductory text, it serves the rural communities with 3 classes over 40 pupils. The first school opened on 15 January 1872 with 20 children, of which only 6 had previously been in education and they learnt the three r's. The school was built by Norman Shaw, the architect of old Scotland Yard. The new school is well built with a big events room, which can be split into separate rooms by sliding doors. With many windows, it is very bright (unlike the old school) and Mrs M. Hunt is currently the headteacher. There is also a pre-school, which meets in the village hall, which is inside of the primary school, for children form ages of 2 to 5 years old.

Mary Beard (classicist) was brought up in Church Preen where her mother was at time headmistress of the Primary School.

== Religious sites and history ==
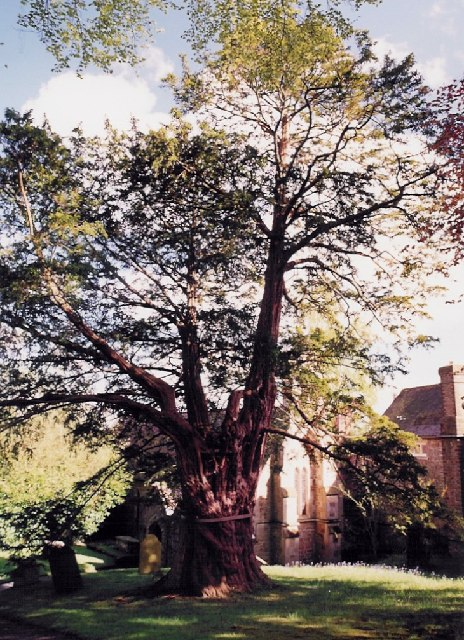
Ancient Yew, Church Preen - geograph.org.uk - 82511

St. John the Baptist Church is the only religious site and is the centre of Church Preen. The church was built in the 13th century and is 70 feet long by 13-foot wide. It was originally a monastic church, which explains the abnormal appearance. The church was founded as a cell of Wenlock Priory in 1163. A prior and 2 or 3 monks would have served the church. The priory has little remains; however a few can be seen when visiting the gardens of Church Preen Manor.

Church Preen Yew (shown on the right), which stands inside the church's grounds is thought to be of a very old age. This is because the Celtic people used to think of them as symbols of death and rebirth. When St. Augustine brought Christianity to England, he ordered that churches were to be built around them, which dates the trees back to the 5th century. In Domesday Book, Preen had a recorded population of seven households, comprising 1 villager, 1 smallholder and 5 slaves.

== Population and housing statistics ==
From 1801 to 1961, the population has changed quite dramatically. In 1801, it was at 84 and rose to a maximum of 117 in 1881. It then decreased back to 89 people by 1961. The percentage of males to females has fluctuated but has been about 55% to 45%. In 1960, it was almost 50% male to 50% females. In 1881, the male population was predominantly in agriculture and the females were in domestic services or offices and non-specified occupations.

The total number of houses in 1840 was 17 houses and rose to 23 in 1880 only to decrease during World War I down to 15 houses. It then grew steadily to 31 by 1961. All the houses have been occupied from 1841 to 1961 apart from one house vacant in 1851.

== See also ==
- Listed buildings in Church Preen
