= Pony Express Museum (California) =

History museum in Western United States

The Pony Express Museum was a museum in California focused on the history of the Western United States, especially mining and the Pony Express. The museum's collection was assembled by W. Parker Lyon, a millionaire who had once been mayor of Fresno. Circa 1932 it was housed in Oak Knoll, Pasadena, where it was open to the public every afternoon. One childhood visitor recalled, "Mr. Lyon had a nice collection of rusty old Winchester rifles, rusty old six-shooters, swords, gold-mining shovels, flumes, and gold scales, much of it relics from California's Gold Rush days. He hung all this stuff up on the walls. That was his method of display. No lighted glass cases here. His other decorating ideas included: old letters, comic signs, horse collars, saddles, and horse-drawn carriages. It was really great!" Exhibits included old whiskey bottles, a glass box of stubs of cigars supposedly smoked by Ulysses S. Grant in 1880, a revolver said to have been owned by Judge Bean, and photos of Lillie Langtry.

The museum moved "across the street from the Santa Anita race track" to land owned by Lucky Baldwin in Arcadia in 1935. At the Arcadia location there were alleged human scalps, five old stage coaches, five old fire engines, a fully-equipped vintage Wells Fargo office, a "bullet-scarred pioneer barroom", a purported vigilante death-count bell, guns, rifles, tomahawks, arrowheads, and wax figures of Old West characters. It was open daily, 8 a.m. to 6 p.m. and admission was 25 cents for adults, 10 cents for children.

In 1954, Lyon's heirs sold collection to William F. Harrah for $150,000, and it was thereafter displayed in Reno, Nevada. In 1981 it was described as "one of the oddest collections of curiosa anywhere" and included chamber pots, Wells Fargo safes, arrowheads, and a cannon that was almost certainly a fake of whatever it was supposed to be. The collection was purchased in 1986 by Greg Martin and auctioned off except for three guns that were the reason Martin wanted the collection.
