= Listed buildings in Hughley, Shropshire =

Hughley is a civil parish in Shropshire, England. It contains four listed buildings that are recorded in the National Heritage List for England. Of these, one is listed at Grade I, the highest of the three grades, one is at Grade II*, the middle grade, and the others are at Grade II, the lowest grade. The parish contains the village of Hughley and the surrounding countryside. The listed buildings are all in the village, and consist of a church, a former smithy, and two houses.

== Key ==
Grade	Criteria
I	Buildings of exceptional interest, sometimes considered to be internationally important
II*	Particularly important buildings of more than special interest
II	Buildings of national importance and special interest

== Buildings ==
Name and location	Photograph	Date	Notes	Grade
St John's Church; 52.57747°N 2.64363°W		13th century	The church was altered in about 1360, the bellcote was added in the early 18th century, and the church was restored in 1871–72 by Richard Norman Shaw. It is built in limestone and conglomerate with sandstone dressings and it has a tile roof with ornamental cresting and coped verges. The church consists of a nave and a chancel in one cell, and a south porch. The bellcote at the west end is timber framed and contains an octagonal clock face on the south side.	I
Old Hall; 52.57653°N 2.64238°W		Mid 16th century	A timber framed house with plaster infill and a tile roof. The main range has two storeys and an attic, and three bays, the central bay containing a two-storey porch, and to the right is a single-storey cross-wing. The upper floor of the porch is jettied with a moulded bressumer, and the windows are casements. Inside the house is an inglenook fireplace.	II*
Former smithy 52.57721°N 2.64277°W	—	Late 18th century	The main block of the former smithy is in red brick with a dentil eaves cornice, there is an extension at the rear to the left in gritstone, and the roof is tiled. It has a single storey and an L-shaped plan. In the main block is a wide segmental arch with a brick keystone containing double doors, and to the right is a hatched opening.	II
Manor House; 52.57860°N 2.64374°W	—	1827–28	A rectory, later a private house, it is in red brick with a dentilled eaves cornice and a hipped slate roof. There are two storeys, a square plan, and sides of three bays. The central doorway has a rectangular fanlight, and the windows are sashes, those in the ground floor with keystones.	II
