= Duke of York Handicap =

- Class: Handicap
- Location: Kempton Park, Sunbury, England
- Inaugurated: 1892
- Final run: 6 May 1960
- Race type: Flat / Thoroughbred
- Website: Kempton Park

Race information
- Distance: 1¼ miles (2,012 metres)
- Surface: Turf
- Track: Right-handed
- Qualification: Three-year-olds and up (from 1892); Three-year-olds only (from 1952)
- Weight: Handicap

The Duke of York Handicap was a flat handicap horse race in Great Britain. It was run at Kempton Park, usually over a distance of 1¼ miles (2,012 metres).

== History ==
Established in 1892, the event was originally called the Duke of York Stakes. It was named after Prince George, Duke of York (later King George V). The original version took place in October, and was open to horses aged three or older.

The Duke of York Stakes was initially contested over one mile. It was extended by three furlongs in 1899, and shortened by a furlong in 1900.

For a period York staged a different Duke of York Stakes at the Ebor meeting in August. A middle-distance race for three-year-olds, it was won by Polymelus in 1905. The same horse won Kempton's version the following year.

The Kempton race was abandoned during World War I. It was renamed the Duke of York Handicap in 1921.

A new event titled the Duke of York Handicap Stakes was introduced at York's May meeting in 1950. The original Kempton version was not regularly contested after World War II, but it was revived with a modified format in 1952. From this point it was restricted to three-year-olds and held in May.

Kempton's Duke of York Handicap continued to be run until 1960. It was replaced by a similar event, the H. S. Persse Memorial Handicap, in 1961. The York race, a six-furlong sprint, was replaced by the current Duke of York Stakes (now known as the Minster Stakes) in 1968.

== Winners ==
- 1892: Miss Dollar
- 1893: Avington
- 1894: St Florian
- 1895: Missal
- 1896: Chin Chin
- 1897: Diakka
- 1898: Sirenia
- 1899: Ercildoune
- 1900: Mount Prospect
- 1901: Revenue
- 1902: Dundonald
- 1903: Sceptre
- 1904: Robert le Diable
- 1905: Donnetta
- 1906: Polymelus
- 1907: Tirara
- 1908: Simonson
- 1909: Buckwheat
- 1910: Wolfe Land
- 1911: Trepida
- 1912: Adam Bede
- 1913: Florist
- 1914: Nassau
- 1915–18: no race
- 1919: Grand Fleet
- 1920: Orpheus
- 1921: Paragon
- 1922: Soubriquet
- 1923: Poisoned Arrow
- 1924: Pharos
- 1925: Pharos
- 1926: Winalot
- 1927: Abbot's Speed
- 1928: Rob
- 1929: Double Life
- 1930: Hot Bun
- 1931: Pricket
- 1932: China King
- 1933: Limelight
- 1934: Statesman
- 1935: British Quota
- 1936: Montrose
- 1937: Noble Turk
- 1938: Rodeo
- 1947: Sea Lover
- 1952: Judicate
- 1953: Noorani
- 1954: Blue Prince
- 1955: Roman Festival
- 1956: Talgo
- 1957: Hesiod
- 1958: Illinois
- 1959: Honest Boy
- 1960: Knight of the Dales

== See also ==
- Horseracing in Great Britain
- List of British flat horse races
