= A. Kingsley Macomber =

American adventurer, businessman, philanthropist, and racehorse owner (1874–1955)

King Macomber
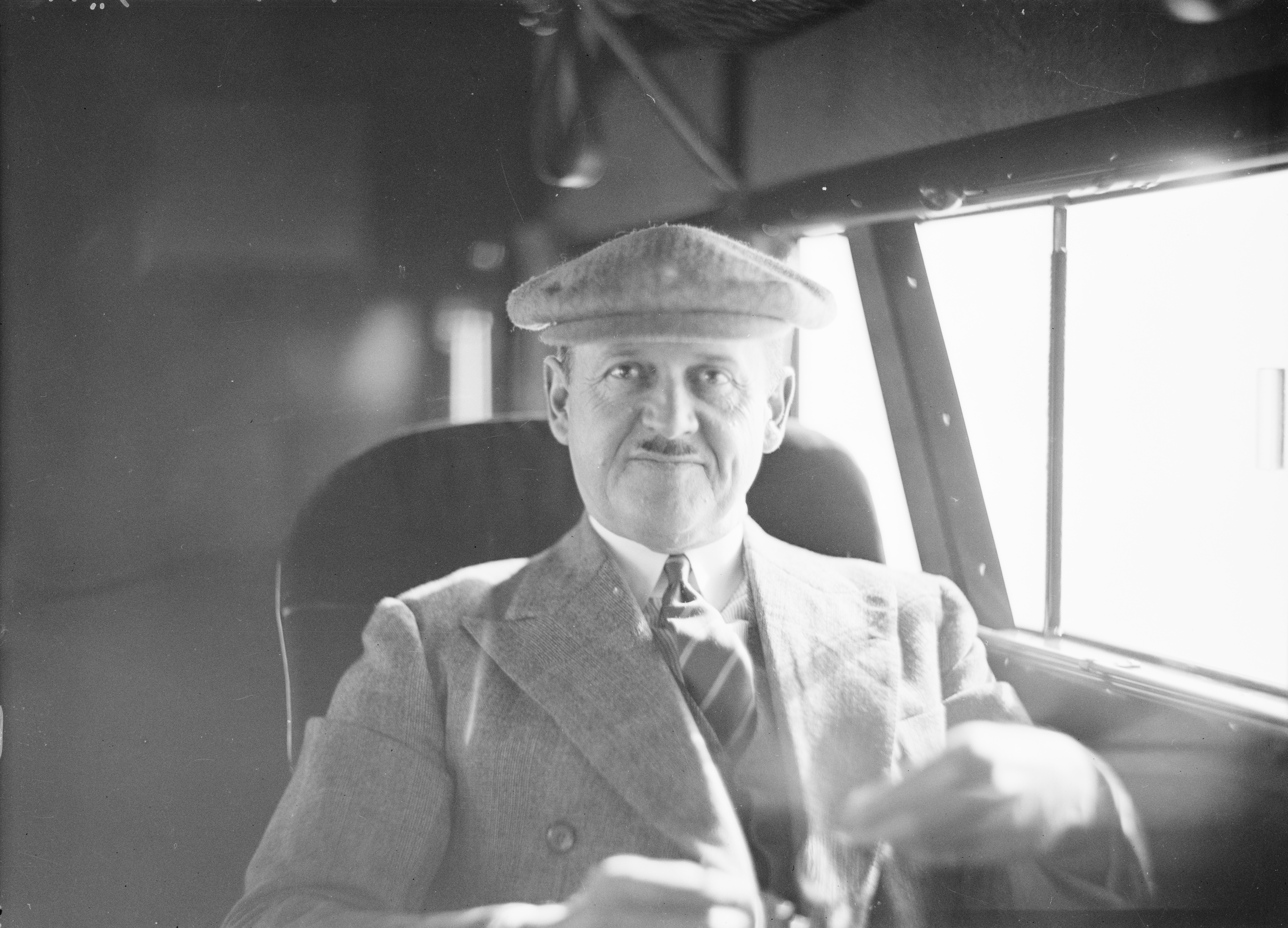
- Born: March 7, 1874; Morristown, New Jersey; U.S.
- Died: October 6, 1955 (aged 81); Paris, France
- Resting place: Woodlawn Cemetery (Bronx, New York)
- Occupations: Adventurer, banker, land developer, rancher, racehorse owner/breeder, philanthropist
- Spouse: Myrtle Harkness
- Parent(s): Henry Kirke Macomber & Amelia C. Collerd

Abraham Kingsley "King" Macomber (March 7, 1874 – October 6, 1955) was an American adventurer, businessman, philanthropist, Thoroughbred-racehorse owner and breeder. He was born in Morristown, New Jersey, the second of the three sons of Henry Kirke Macomber, a medical doctor who moved his family to Pasadena, California, in 1883.

== African adventurer ==
As a young man, in 1894 Kingsley Macomber explored parts of Central Africa at the invitation of American adventurer Frederick Russell Burnham. With Burnham and seven other Americans, he spent six months surveying and mapping in an area that today is known as Zimbabwe.

When hostilities broke out between the native Matabeles and the white intruders, Macomber escaped a massacre but then was caught in the Siege of Bulawayo. A small group of British and a few Americans held off attacks for two months at a hastily erected laager at Bulawayo until being rescued by the British military. Macomber soon left Africa and traveled to London, England, where he was honored with a fellowship in the Royal Geographical Society. In December 1896, he returned to the United States.

Kingsley Macomber's time in Africa led to a lifelong friendship with Frederick Burnham and years later in 1939, Burnham, Macomber and John Eagle gifted a natural history collection to the state of Arizona. Although largely African, the significant collection included artifacts gathered worldwide.

In 1899, in New York City, Kingsley Macomber married heiress Myrtle Harkness, the daughter of the wealthy Lamon V. Harkness, one of the largest stockholders in Standard Oil. The couple maintained residences on both coasts.

== Business career ==
At the end of the nineteenth century, Macomber and a partner established a business that operated a coal mine in Gallup, New Mexico, and undertook prospecting and mining ventures in the Cascade and Pacific Coast ranges.

In 1902, Macomber became a founding owner and first president of the Los Angeles Trust Company, which, in 1905, became a part of a multi-bank amalgamation.

In 1905, Kingsley Macomber, Henry E. Huntington, and William R. Staats developed the Oak Knoll subdivision in terrain between Pasadena and San Marino, California.

In 1906, Macomber purchased Rancho Cienega de los Paicines, a cattle breeding operation located in Paicines, California. He invested a great deal of money in a new home as well as stables to facilitate the introduction of Thoroughbred horses to the operation. He kept a private railcar at nearby Tres Pinos, which allowed him and his wife to travel to horse-racing venues throughout the country. After World War I, the Macombers made a chateau in France, at Carrières-sous-Poissy, their primary residence, and, in 1927, sold the Paicines ranch to Walter Murphy.

== Thoroughbred racing ==
From 1892 until her marriage to Kingsley Macomber, Myrtle Harkness had spent much time around horses at her father's Walnut Hall Farm near Lexington, Kentucky. With both having considerable interest and history with horses, Kingsley and Myrtle Macomber became major international figures in the sport of Thoroughbred horse racing.

In 1918, Kingsley Macomber's colt War Cloud ran fourth in the Kentucky Derby then won the Preakness Stakes. Of his six Kentucky Derby runners, Star Hawk had the best result when he ran second in 1916. Other Macomber horses won a number of important American races including the Travers Stakes, Suburban Handicap, and Withers Stakes. In 1911, virtually all horse racing in the United States shut down as a result of government legislation that banned parimutuel betting. As a consequence, Macomber and several notable American stable owners shifted their racing operations to England and France. While the ban on wagering was lifted within two years, and racing returned to U.S. tracks, many owners retained large operations in Europe, and, by 1925, Macomber had more than one hundred horses in training in England. Nonetheless, he supported California racing, and, in 1923, he became a founding member and director of the Pacific Coast Jockey Club, headed by Adolph B. Spreckels.

The "Macomber Family Collection about Race Horse Breeding" is at the Department of Special Collections in the University of California, Los Angeles, library. The collection is made up of photographs, ephemera, an album, and a catalog relative to the horse-breeding and ranching interests of Dr. Henry Macomber, A. Kingsley Macomber, and John Kingsley Macomber.

=== Life and racing in France ===
During the second decade of the 20th century, Kingsley Macomber was a frequent visitor to Europe and, around 1919, he purchased the Haras de Cheffreville horse breeding farm. A few years later he acquired two properties owned by a fellow American, William K. Vanderbilt: the Haras du Quesnay breeding farm in Normandy, and a chateau at Carrières-sous-Poissy, which included a stable for Thoroughbreds, a training track, and bloodstock of approximately one hundred and fifty mares and sires, including the great Maintenon. The Carrières-sous-Poissy property, located near the Maisons-Laffitte Racecourse, was on the Paris-to-Deauville railway line, making for easy shipping of horses to the Deauville Racecourse.

Thoroughbreds owned by Macomber won major races in France and England. Notably, in 1923, his colt Parth won the prestigious Prix de l'Arc de Triomphe at Longchamp Racecourse, and Gold Bridge won back-to-back runnings of the King's Stand Stakes at Royal Ascot in 1933 and 1934.

Part of Parisian high society, according to his obituary in Sports Illustrated, Macomber was hailed as the "undisputed head of American society in Europe." He served as president of the American Hospital of Paris from 1926 to 1928.

== Philanthropy ==
Macomber was a lover of military history; his father had served with the Union Army during the American Civil War. While living in France, he promoted the important historic relationship between that country and the United States. In 1931, he commissioned a monument of Admiral François Joseph Paul de Grasse which was erected at the Trocadéro Palace in Paris. During the American Revolutionary War De Grasse had commanded the 1781 French fleet which blocked the British retreat from Yorktown and made possible the American victory.

In 1934, Macomber donated another American Revolutionary War statue to the city of Newport, Rhode Island. The sculpture of French General Rochambeau is a replica of one in Paris. It was from Newport that General Rochambeau departed with his army to join General George Washington and march on to Yorktown.

Macomber also patronized the game of tennis. In the 1920s and 1930s, he supported the A. K. Macomber tournament at Monte Carlo.

A. Kingsley Macomber died on October 6, 1955, in Paris, France. He is buried in Woodlawn Cemetery in the Bronx in his wife's father's mausoleum.
