= Listed buildings in Church Preen =

Church Preen is a civil parish in Shropshire, England. It contains five listed buildings that are recorded in the National Heritage List for England. Of these, one is listed at Grade II*, the middle of the three grades, and the others are at Grade II, the lowest grade. The parish contains the village of Church Preen and the surrounding countryside. The oldest listed building is the church, which dates back to the 12th century. The other listed buildings date from the 1870s, around the time when Richard Norman Shaw designed Preen Manor, which was built on the site of a previous monastery. The manor has since been demolished and replaced by another house, which is not listed, but some structures associated with the manor have survived and are listed.

== Key ==
Grade	Criteria
II*	Particularly important buildings of more than special interest
II	Buildings of national importance and special interest

== Buildings ==
Name and location	Photograph	Date	Notes	Grade
St John the Baptist's Church; 52.57920°N 2.67545°W		12th century	The oldest part of the church is the nave, with the chancel dating from the 13th century. The church was restored in 1866, when the bellcote and vestry were added, and the south chapel was built in 1920–25. The church is built in limestone and has a tiled roof. It consists of a nave and a chancel in one cell, a north porch, and north vestry and a south chapel. The bellcote is on the west gable, and the windows are lancets.	II*
East Lodge; 52.58646°N 2.66827°W	—	c. 1870	The lodge is at the entrance to the drive to Preen Manor. It has two storeys, the ground floor is in sandstone, and the upper floor is timber framed. The roof is tiled and has gables with fretted bargeboards. There is a T-shaped plan, and the windows vary; there is one mullioned window, some are mullioned and transomed, and others are casements.	II
Garden wall, Preen Manor; 52.57896°N 2.67508°W	—	c. 1870	The wall was designed by Richard Norman Shaw and is in limestone with gabled stone capping. It is about 25 metres (82 ft) long, and stepped in the centre to contain a pointed double-chamfered gateway.	II
Kitchen garden wall and ruined outbuilding, Preen Manor; 52.57843°N 2.67578°W	—	c. 1870	The wall and former outbuilding were designed by Richard Norman Shaw and are in limestone. The wall is about 130 metres (430 ft) long, it contains 14 gabled brick buttresses, and the west side is faced with brick. In the centre is a pointed double-chamfered gateway, and at the north end it is ramped up to meet the former rectangular outbuilding, now roofless and enclosing a sunken garden.	II
Old School House; 52.57420°N 2.65825°W		1872	Originally a school designed by Richard Norman Shaw, later a private house, it is in limestone with some timber framing, and has a tile roof. There is a T-shaped plan, the former school to the right has one storey, and the former master's house to the left has two. The former house has a large timber-framed gable and a mullioned window in each floor. In the former school are two tall mullioned and transomed windows rising through the eaves as tile-hung dormers. In both parts are doorway with pointed heads.	II
