= 1892 Epsom Derby =

112th running of the Epsom Derby horse race

- Epsom Derby
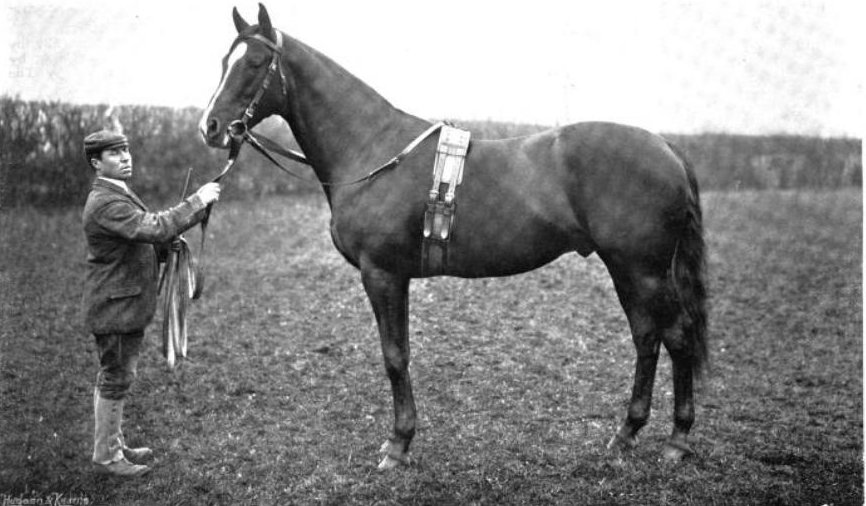
- Location: Epsom Downs Racecourse
- Date: 1 June 1892
- Winning horse: Sir Hugo
- Starting price: 40/1
- Jockey: Fred Allsopp
- Trainer: Tom Wadlow
- Owner: 3rd Earl of Bradford

The 1892 Epsom Derby was a horse race which took place at Epsom Downs on 1 June 1892. It was the 112th running of the Derby and was won by Sir Hugo. The winner was ridden by Fred Allsopp and trained by Tom Wadlow.

== Race details ==
- Prize money to winner: £5500
- Number of runners: 13
- Winner's time: 2m 44s

== Full result ==
	*	Horse	Jockey	Trainer	SP
1		Sir Hugo	Fred Allsopp	Tom Wadlow	40/1
2	¾	La Fleche	George Barrett	John Porter	11/10 fav
3	1	Bucentaure	Chesterman		100/1
4		St. Angelo	Fred Webb		100/6
5		Thessalian	T Weldon		100/6
6		St. Damien	R Chaloner		100/7
7		Llanthony	F Barrett		100/6
8		Hatfield	Fred Rickaby		1000/15
9		Rueil	Lane		100/9
10		Persistive	John Watts		25/1
11		Bona Vista	Jack Robinson	William Jarvis	100/8
12		Galeopsis	C Loates		100/1
13		El Diablo	Morny Cannon		20/1

* The distances between the horses are shown in lengths or shorter. shd = short-head; hd = head; PU = pulled up.

== Winner's details ==
Further details of the winner, Sir Hugo:

- Foaled: 1889
- Sire: Wisdom; Dam: Manoeuvre (Lord Clifden)
- Owner: 3rd Earl of Bradford
- Breeder: 3rd Earl of Bradford
