= Oak Knoll, Pasadena, California =

Neighborhood in Pasadena, California, United States

Coordinates: 34.124365°N 118.135983°W

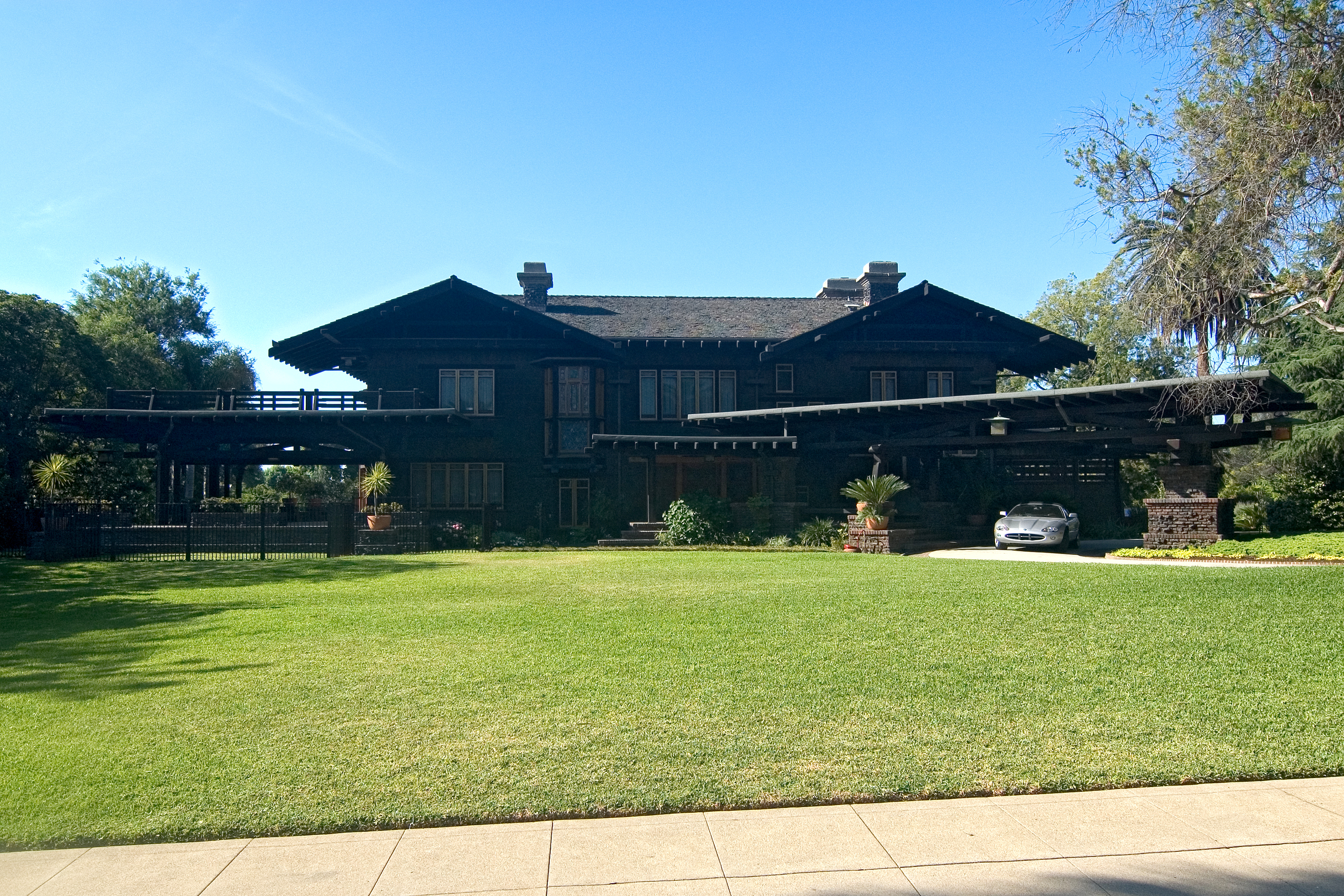
the Robert R. Blacker House is located in the Oak Knoll neighborhood

Oak Knoll is the southernmost neighborhood in Pasadena, California. It is bordered by Oak Knoll Circle to the north, Old Mill Road to the south, South Oak Knoll Avenue and South Oakland Avenue to the west, and the San Marino border (Kewen Drive and Encino Drive) to the east.

The eponymous knoll is a 150 ft-high ridge formed by the Raymond Fault.

An upscale neighborhood on rolling, oak-covered terrain, it was developed in 1905 by a corporate partnership between prominent Northeastern United States and California residents A. Kingsley Macomber, Henry E. Huntington and William R. Staats. Huntington owned the Pacific Electric and built the Pasadena via Oak Knoll Line to serve the Wentworth Hotel (later Huntington Hotel, and now The Langham Huntington, Pasadena) and later the rest of the neighborhood.

Several listed properties, such as the Robert R. Blacker House, are located in the Oak Knoll neighborhood.

== Education ==
Oak Knoll is served by Allendale Elementary School, Hamilton Elementary School, McKinley School and Blair High School.

== Culture ==
A key setting of Raymond Chandler's 1942 novel, The High Window, is a house in the "Oak Noll section of Pasadena."

=== Historical estates ===
- Robert R. Blacker House, designed by Charles and Henry Greene
- Cordelia A. Culbertson House, designed by Charles and Henry Greene
- Spinks House, designed by Henry Greene
- Huntington Hotel, designed by Charles Frederick Whittlesey and Myron Hunt

== Transportation ==
Oak Knoll was served by Metro Local line 258 until December 18, 2020, when service was discontinued due to low ridership in the area.

== Government ==
Oak Knoll is part of Pasadena City Council District 7, represented by Andy Wilson.

== See also ==
- Pony Express Museum (California)
