= Polymelus =

British-bred Thoroughbred racehorse

- Sire: Cyllene
- Grandsire: Bona Vista
- Dam: Maid Marian
- Damsire: Hampton
- Sex: Stallion
- Foaled: 1902
- Died: 1924 (aged 21–22)
- Country: United Kingdom of Great Britain and Ireland
- Colour: Bay
- Breeder: Robert Crewe-Milnes, 1st Marquess of Crewe
- Owner: Earl of Crewe; David Faber; Solomon Joel
- Trainer: 1) John Porter; Mr. Baker; Charles Peck
- Record: 31: 11–7–2
- Earnings: £16,803

Major wins
- Criterion Stakes (1904); Richmond Stakes (1904); Duke of York Stakes (1905); Duke of York Handicap (1906); Cambridgeshire Handicap (1906); Champion Stakes (1906); Princess of Wales's Stakes (1907)

Awards
- Leading sire in Great Britain and Ireland (1914, 1915, 1916, 1920, 1921)
- Last updated on May 6, 2010

Polymelus (1902–1924) was a British Thoroughbred racehorse who was the leading sire of racehorses in Great Britain and Ireland for five years (1914, 1915, 1916, 1920, 1921). Among his most famous descendants are Secretariat and Northern Dancer. However, it was through his son Phalaris that he may be most remembered. His great-grandsire was Bend Or.

== Background ==
Polymelus was a bay horse bred by Lord Crewe. He was sired by Cyllene, an Ascot Gold Cup winner, who went on to become a highly successful stallion. In addition to Polymelus, he sired The Derby winners Cicero, Minoru, Tagalie and Lemberg and was champion sire in 1909 and 1910.

Polymelus's dam Maid Marian was a half-sister to the outstanding racemare La Fleche and later became an influential broodmare in her own right, being the foundation mare of Thoroughbred family 3-f. Her other descendants have included Big Red Mike, Mioland, Mont Tremblant, Pont l'Eveque, Right Royal and Saint Estephe.

== Racing career ==
Poymelus showed great promise as a two-year-old, winning both the Criterion Stakes and the Richmond Stakes.

As a three-year-old in 1905 he showed form over a wide variety of distances, winning the Duke of York Stakes over six furlong and finishing second in the St Leger.

In 1906 Polymelus was offered for sale at Newmarket and bought for 4,200 guineas by Solomon Joel. The colt reached his peak later that year when he recorded victories in the Duke of York Handicap, Cambridgeshire Handicap and Champion Stakes. He added a win in the Princess of Wales's Stakes in 1907 before being retired to stud.

== Stud record ==
Polymelus stood at stud at Solomon Joel's Maiden Erlegh Stud near Reading, Berkshire where he died in 1924. Among his progeny, Polymelus sired:

Foaled	Name	Sex	Major wins/achievements
1911	Black Jester	Stallion	St Leger Stakes (1914)
1912	Pommern	Stallion	English Triple Crown (1915)
1913	Fifinella	Mare	Epsom Oaks (1916), Epsom Derby (1916)
1913	Phalaris	Stallion	Leading sire in Great Britain and Ireland (1925, 1928), Leading broodmare sire in Great Britain and Ireland (1937, 1941, 1942)
1918	Humorist	Stallion	Epsom Derby (1921)
1920	Parth	Stallion	Prix de l'Arc de Triomphe (1923)

The skeleton of Polymelus is now on display in the entrance lobby of the University of Cambridge Museum of Zoology, where it is an example of the specialised adaptations to high-speed running.

== Pedigree ==
Pedigree of Polymelus (GB), bay stallion, 1902
Sire Cyllene (GB) 1895	Bona Vista (GB); 1889	Bend Or	Doncaster
Sire Cyllene (GB) 1895	Bona Vista (GB); 1889	Bend Or	Rouge Rose
Sire Cyllene (GB) 1895	Bona Vista (GB); 1889	Vista	Macaroni
Sire Cyllene (GB) 1895	Bona Vista (GB); 1889	Vista	Verdure
Sire Cyllene (GB) 1895	Arcadia (GB); 1887	Isonomy	Sterling
Sire Cyllene (GB) 1895	Arcadia (GB); 1887	Isonomy	Isola Bella
Sire Cyllene (GB) 1895	Arcadia (GB); 1887	Distant Shore	Hermit
Sire Cyllene (GB) 1895	Arcadia (GB); 1887	Distant Shore	Lands End
Dam Maid Marian (GB) 1886	Hampton (GB); 1872	Lord Clifden	Newminster
Dam Maid Marian (GB) 1886	Hampton (GB); 1872	Lord Clifden	The Slave
Dam Maid Marian (GB) 1886	Hampton (GB); 1872	Lady Langden	Kettledrum
Dam Maid Marian (GB) 1886	Hampton (GB); 1872	Lady Langden	Haricot
Dam Maid Marian (GB) 1886	Quiver (GB); 1872	Toxophilite	Longbow
Dam Maid Marian (GB) 1886	Quiver (GB); 1872	Toxophilite	Legerdemain
Dam Maid Marian (GB) 1886	Quiver (GB); 1872	Young Melbourne mare	Young Melbourne
Dam Maid Marian (GB) 1886	Quiver (GB); 1872	Young Melbourne mare	Brown Bess (Family 3-f)
