= Bona Vista =

British-bred Thoroughbred racehorse

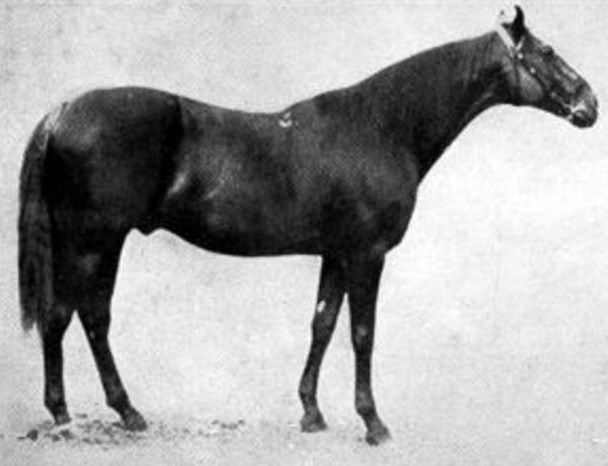
- Photo of Bona Vista
- Sire: Bend Or
- Grandsire: Doncaster
- Dam: Vista
- Damsire: Macaroni
- Sex: Stallion
- Foaled: 1889
- Died: 1909 (aged 19–20)
- Country: Great Britain
- Colour: Chestnut
- Breeder: 5th Earl of Rosebery
- Owner: Charles Day Rose
- Trainer: William Jarvis
- Record: 7: 3–0–2

Major wins
- Woodcote Stakes (1891); Newmarket Biennial Stakes (1892); 2000 Guineas Stakes (1892)

Awards
- Champion sire in Hungary (1902, 1903, 1904, 1905, 1908)

Bona Vista (1889–1909) was a British Thoroughbred racehorse. As a two-year-old he won the Woodcote Stakes at Epsom Downs. As a three-year-old he won the Newmarket Biennial Stakes, before winning the 2000 Guineas Stakes by one and a half lengths. He was trained by William Jarvis and owned by Charles Day Rose. After retiring from racing Bona Vista became a successful stallion, siring Ascot Gold Cup winner Cyllene. Through his son Cyllene and grandson Polymelus, Bona Vista's sire line is the most dominant in Thoroughbred racehorses today.

== Background ==
Bona Vista, sometimes spelled Bonavista, was a chestnut colt bred by Archibald Primrose, 5th Earl of Rosebery, and foaled in 1889. He was sired by Derby and Champion Stakes winner Bend Or. After retiring from racing Bend Or became a successful stallion. His most successful son was the unbeaten Triple Crown winner, Ormonde. He also sired the champion sire Kendal and Eclipse Stakes winner Orbit. Bend Or was also the leading broodmare sire in Great Britain and Ireland for two years. Bona Vista's dam was Vista, a daughter Macaroni. She won several races, including the Great Metropolitan Handicap, and had already foaled Derby and St Leger winner Sir Visto and Eclipse and Champion Stakes winner Velasquez before producing Bona Vista.

Charles Day Rose purchased Bona Vista as a yearling at Newmarket in 1890 for 1250 guineas. This was just above the reserve of 1200 guineas set by the Earl of Rosebery, who apparently regretted selling the colt. Bona Vista was put into training with William Jarvis.

== Racing career ==
=== 1891: Two-year-old season ===
Bona Vista made his first race start on 26 May 1891 in the Woodcote Stakes over six furlongs at Epsom Downs. Ridden by J. Woodburn, he started as the even money favourite. With a quarter of a mile left to run the colt Rioter took the lead, but then struggled. Bona Vista and Pilgrim's Progress overtook Rioter and Bona Vista won the race by a length from Pilgrim's Progress. Rioter finished in third place and El Diablo fourth. Bona Vista faced Pilgrim's Progress again at Royal Ascot in the New Stakes. He started the race as the event's favourite, but could only finish third, five lengths behind the winner, Goldfinch. Bona Vista's final start of the season came in the Chesterfield Stakes in July at Newmarket. He started as the second favourite, behind La Fleche, who was receiving seven pounds from Bona Vista. La Fleche led the race in the early stages, with Bona Vista second. In the closing stages Bona Vista was overtaken by Lady Hermit, but neither could catch leader La Fleche, who won by two lengths from Lady Hermit. Bona Vista was three-quarters of a length behind the runner-up in third place.

=== 1892: Three-year-old season ===
Bona Vista started his three-year-old campaign in the Biennial Stakes, run over one mile at Newmarket, where he only faced three rivals. In the early stages Curio led the race from Platoon, the pair being clear of Bona Vista and Tanzmeister. The field remained in that order until they were into the second half of the race, when the four horses bunched up. The four raced right up to the finish line, with Bona Vista winning by a head from Tanzmeister and Curio a head behind Tanzmeister in third.

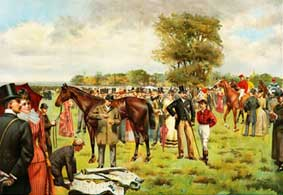
Horses in the paddock before the 1892 Derby

After this narrow victory Bona Vista started the 2000 Guineas Stakes at the price of 10/1 and faced thirteen opponents. After the start, St. Angelo immediately went to the front, racing on the left-hand side of the course, he led Galeopsis and Scarborough. Bona Vista was leading the horses that were racing down the centre of the track. Shortly after half-way St. Angelo was still leading from Galeopsis, with Bona Vista in third being followed by Sir Hugo, Goldfinch and El Diablo. Sir Hugo and Goldfinch soon faded and this left Curio behind the three leaders. Bona Vista took the lead with about one furlong left to run and under jockey W. Robinson he pulled steadily away to win by one and a half lengths from St. Angelo. Half a length behind St. Angelo was Curio, who just beat Galeopsis for third place. These for were well clear of Goldfinch, who pulled up lame, and led the rest of the field home. The 9/2 favourite El Diablo eventually finished in eighth place.

On 1 June, Bona Vista returned to the place of his first race, Epsom Downs, for the Derby Stakes. La Fleche was the strong pre-race favourite, priced at 11/10. Rueil was second favourite at 100/9, then Bona Vista at 100/8 and St. Damien at 100/7. In the early stages of the race Sir Hugo led the race, with Llanthony, Persistive and Galeopsis also prominent. By the time the field reached the milepost Thessalian led the race from St. Damien, with Bona Vista near the middle of the pack. Bona Vista never got to the leaders and finished back in eleventh place. The race was won by 40/1 outsider Sir Hugo, who held of La Fleche by three quarters of a length. At Royal Ascot, Bona Vista competed in the Prince of Wales's Stakes. After the field had settled down after the start Watercress led the field, with Bona Vista not amongst the front runners. Bona Vista never reached the leaders and finished in seventh place. Watercress won the race by one length from Tanzmeister. Bona Vista was entered for the St. Leger Stakes, but was withdrawn due to a ligament injury.

== Race record ==
Race record
| Date | Race name | D (F) | Course | Prize | Odds | Runners | Place | Margin (L) | Winner/Runner-up | Time | Jockey | Ref. |
|---|---|---|---|---|---|---|---|---|---|---|---|---|
| 26 May 1891 | Woodcote Stakes | 6 | Epsom Downs | | Evens | 8 | 1 | 1 | Pilgrim's Progress | | Jimmy Woodburn | |
| 11 June 1891 | New Stakes | 5 1/2 | Ascot | £1979 | Evens | 10 | 3 | 5 | Goldfinch | 1:15.0 | John Watts | |
| 16 July 1891 | Chesterfield Stakes | 5 | Newmarket | £770 | Evens | 5 | 3 | 2.75 | La Fleche | 1:04.2 | John Watts | |
| 19 April 1892 | Biennial Stakes | 8 | Newmarket | | 2/1 | 4 | 1 | Neck | Tanzmeister | | John Watts | |
| 4 May 1892 | 2000 Guineas Stakes | 8 | Newmarket | £4440 | 10/1 | 14 | 1 | 1.5 | St. Angelo | 1:54.0 | Jack Robinson | |
| 1 June 1892 | Derby Stakes | 12 | Epsom Downs | £5500 | 100/8 | 12 | 11 | | Sir Hugo | 2:44.0 | Jack Robinson | |
| 1 June 1892 | Prince of Wales's Stakes | 13 | Ascot | | 8/1 | 12 | 7 | | Watercress | 2:51.8 | John Watts | |

Note: F = Furlongs, L = Lengths

== Stud career ==
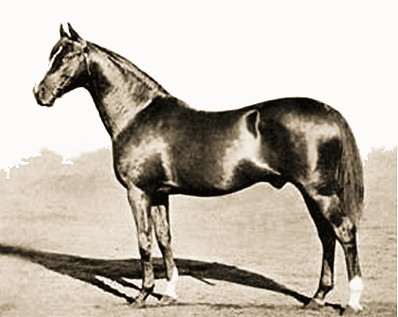
Bona Vista's son Cyllene

Bona Vista initially stood for at Hardwicke Stud in Berkshire for a fee of 25 guineas. In 1897 he was purchased for 15,000 guineas by Prince Louis Esterhazy to stand at stud in Hungary, where he was champion sire five times. Through his son Cyllene, and Cyllene's son Polymelus, Bona Vista's sire line is the most dominant in Thoroughbred racehorses today. Bona Vista's most notable progeny were:

| Foaled | Name | Sex | Major Wins/Achievements |
|---|---|---|---|
| 1895 | Cyllene | Stallion | Ascot Gold Cup (1899), Leading sire in Great Britain and Ireland |
| 1895 | Lady Chancellor | Mare | |
| 1896 | Rose Tree | Mare | |
| 1896 | Santa Casa | | |
| 1897 | Bonarosa | Stallion | Woodcote Stakes, St James's Palace Stakes |
| 1897 | Vahren | Mare | |
| 1900 | Bono Modo | | Deutsches Derby |
| 1902 | Patience | Mare | Deutsches Derby |
| 1907 | Orient | | Deutsches Derby |

Bona Vista died in Hungary in 1909, at the age of twenty.

== Pedigree ==
Pedigree of Bona Vista, chestnut stallion, 1889
| Sire Bend Or (GB) ch. 1877 | Doncaster ch. 1870 | Stockwell ch. 1849 | The Baron |
| Sire Bend Or (GB) ch. 1877 | Doncaster ch. 1870 | Stockwell ch. 1849 | Pocahontas* |
| Sire Bend Or (GB) ch. 1877 | Doncaster ch. 1870 | Marigold ch. 1860 | Teddington |
| Sire Bend Or (GB) ch. 1877 | Doncaster ch. 1870 | Marigold ch. 1860 | Ratan mare |
| Sire Bend Or (GB) ch. 1877 | Rouge Rose ch. 1865 | Thormanby ch. 1857 | Windhound |
| Sire Bend Or (GB) ch. 1877 | Rouge Rose ch. 1865 | Thormanby ch. 1857 | Alice Hawthorn |
| Sire Bend Or (GB) ch. 1877 | Rouge Rose ch. 1865 | Ellen Horne br. 1844 | Redshank |
| Sire Bend Or (GB) ch. 1877 | Rouge Rose ch. 1865 | Ellen Horne br. 1844 | Delhi |
| Dam Vista (GB) b. 1879 | Macaroni b. 1860 | Sweetmeat b./br. 1842 | Gladiator |
| Dam Vista (GB) b. 1879 | Macaroni b. 1860 | Sweetmeat b./br. 1842 | Lollypop |
| Dam Vista (GB) b. 1879 | Macaroni b. 1860 | Jocose b. 1843 | Pantaloon |
| Dam Vista (GB) b. 1879 | Macaroni b. 1860 | Jocose b. 1843 | Banter |
| Dam Vista (GB) b. 1879 | Verdure ch. 1867 | King Tom b. 1851 | Harkaway |
| Dam Vista (GB) b. 1879 | Verdure ch. 1867 | King Tom b. 1851 | Pocahontas* |
| Dam Vista (GB) b. 1879 | Verdure ch. 1867 | May Bloom b. 1861 | Newminster |
| Dam Vista (GB) b. 1879 | Verdure ch. 1867 | May Bloom b. 1861 | Lady Hawthorn (Family 4-f) |

Note: b. = Bay, br. = Brown, ch. = Chestnut

* Bona Vista was inbred 4x4 to Pocahontas. This means that the mare appears twice in the fourth generation of his pedigree.
