= Sir Hugo =

British-bred Thoroughbred racehorse

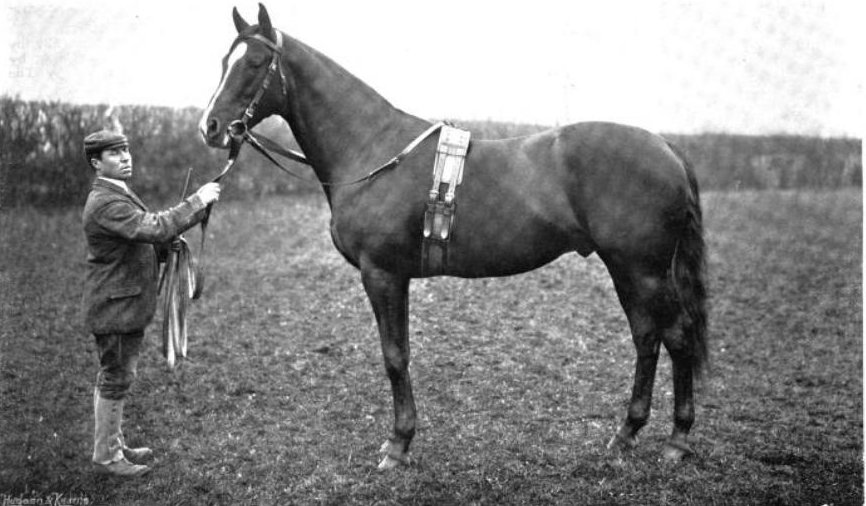
- Sir Hugo, circa 1891-1897.
- Sire: Wisdom
- Grandsire: Blinkhoolie
- Dam: Manoeuvre
- Damsire: Lord Clifden
- Sex: Stallion
- Foaled: 1889
- Country: United Kingdom of Great Britain and Ireland
- Colour: Chestnut
- Breeder: Orlando Bridgeman, 3rd Earl of Bradford
- Owner: Orlando Bridgeman, 3rd Earl of Bradford
- Trainer: Tom Wadlow
- Record: 13: 4-2-4
- Earnings: £

Major wins
- Epsom Derby (1892)

Sir Hugo (1889–1910) was a British Thoroughbred racehorse and sire. In a career that lasted from 1891 to 1894 he ran eight times and won three races. As a three-year-old in 1892 he won The Derby at odds of 40/1. He was a consistent performer in top class races, but certainly inferior to his contemporaries Orme and La Fleche.

== Background ==
Sir Hugo was a big, "very-finely made" chestnut horse with a white blaze, bred by his owner Orlando Bridgeman, 3rd Earl of Bradford. The colt was sent to the Earl’s private establishment at Weston Park in Shropshire where he was trained by Tom Wadlow.

Sir Hugo’s sire, Wisdom, died in 1893. His other progeny included Love Wisely, winner of the Ascot Gold Cup, La Sagesse and Surefoot, winner of the 2000 Guineas and Eclipse Stakes.[4] Sir Hugo’s dam, Manoeuvre, was placed in the St Leger. Her other progeny included the steeplechaser Flying Column.[5]

== Racing career ==
=== 1891: two-year-old season ===
Sir Hugo was a successful two-year-old, winning two of his five starts. He made his first appearance at Ascot where he finished third to Polyglot and St Damien in a Triennial Stakes. On 30 July Sir Hugo ran in a Rous Memorial Stakes at Goodwood in which he started the 2/1 favourite in a field of five and won “cleverly” by two lengths from Kyle

In September Sir Hugo was sent to Doncaster for the Champagne Stakes. He started at 9/1 and finished third of the five runners behind the outstanding filly La Fleche. In October he won the Boscawen Stakes at Newmarket, beating "nothing of note". Two weeks later Sir Hugo contested the year’s most important two-year-old race, the Middle Park Plate over six furlongs at the same course. He was not strongly fancied and finished fifth of the ten runners behind the odds-on favourite Orme.

Sir Hugo was not considered a serious contender for the following season's Classics

=== 1892: three-year-old season ===
Sir Hugo began his three-year-old season on 4 May by running in the 2000 Guineas, a race which was considered very open after the withdrawal of the favourite Orme. He raced prominently, showing in third place at one stage, before finishing sixth of the fourteen runners behind Bona Vista

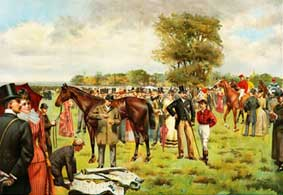
Horses in the paddock before the 1892 Derby

In the Derby on 1 June at Epsom Sir Hugo started at odds of 40/1 in a field of thirteen with La Fleche, who had won the 1000 Guineas being made the 11/10 favourite. He was ridden by the lightweight jockey Fred Allsopp, who had to carry more than 28 pounds of "dead weight" to make the stipulated 126 pounds. The weather was "gloriously fine" and the crowd was larger than usual. After several false starts which delayed the race by half an hour, the early running was made by Thessalian and Persistive with Sir Hugo just behind the leaders. The French-trained colt Bucentaur took the lead turning into the straight. Sir Hugo moved past Bucentaur a furlong from the finish and was strongly challenged by La Fleche. Cheered on by the bookmakers, Sir Hugo prevailed by three quarters of a length from the filly after a "desperate struggle", with Bucentaur a length further back in third Lord Bradford received £7,000 in prize money, but far more in winning bets, having backed Sir Hugo for the race at 100/1 before he ever ran. There were many observers who considered Sir Hugo's win to have been a "fluke". George Barrett, the rider of La Fleche, was criticised for giving the filly too much ground to make up while others drew attention to a collision between St. Angelo and Rueil at Tattenham corner which ended both colts' chances.

Sir Hugo was then sent to Royal Ascot where he started 4/6 favourite for the St. James's Palace Stakes over one mile. He led into the straight but was overtaken in the last quarter mile and finished third behind St Angelo, who won easily by three quarters of a length, and Watercress.

Sir Hugo returned on 7 September for the St Leger at Doncaster. He was third choice in the betting behind Orme, who had returned from training problems (he had allegedly been poisoned) to win the Eclipse Stakes and La Fleche, who had won the Oaks two days after her defeat in the Derby. On a wet day in front of a huge crowd, Sir Hugo broke quickly but was then held up as Orme made the early running. Orme was a beaten horse by the time the field turned into the straight when La Fleche went into the lead. Sir Hugo produced a strong finish and ran on in "dogged fashion" to prove the best of the colts but could never get on terms with the filly and finished second, beaten two lengths, with Orme well beaten in fifth.

On 27 September Sir Hugo again challenged La Fleche in the £10,000 Lancashire Plate over one mile at Manchester Racecourse, but was never a threat and finished fifth of the eleven runners At Newmarket on 11 October he produced an excellent performance in defeat in the ten furlong Lowther Stakes, losing by a neck in a "close set-to" with El Diablo, to whom he was conceding fifteen pounds. In the Limekiln Stakes over one mile at the Newmarket Houghton meeting, Sir Hugo was provided with a pacemaker named Flank March, but the tactic failed as he was well beaten, finishing third to Orme and El Diablo.

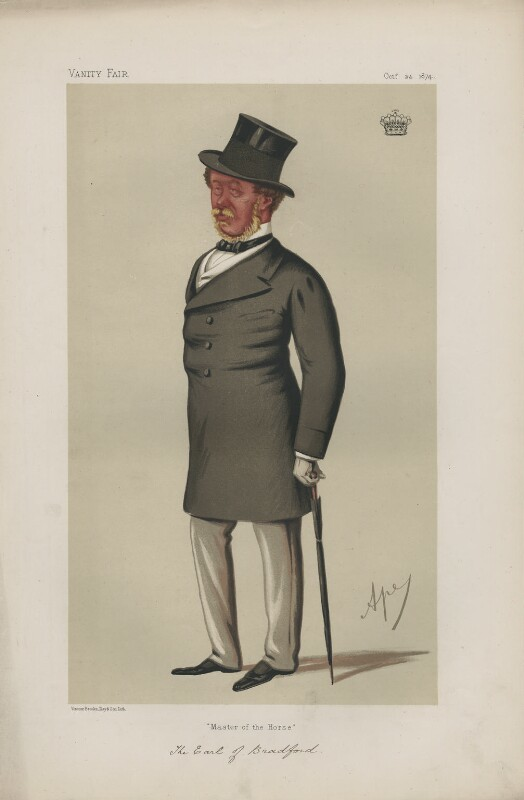
3rd Earl of Bradford, Sir Hugo's owner and breeder.

=== 1893: four-year-old season ===
Sir Hugo was kept in training as a four-year-old and made his debut in a Biennial Stakes over two miles at Newmarket on 20 April. He made the running and after a brief challenge from Barrow, won "in a canter" by three lengths. Although the opposition was not strong, he was described as having won "in the style of a good horse."

He did not stand up to further training and was retired in autumn. It was announced that he would go to stud with a fee of 150 guineas.

== Assessment and earnings ==
The general opinion of Sir Hugo during his career was that he had been a sub-standard, and rather fortunate Derby winner. At the end of his three-year-old season one commentator pointed out that although Sir Hugo lacked acceleration ("that dash of speed"), he had shown stamina, strength and an "equable temper", making him a good stallion prospect.

Sir Hugo's win prize money of £6,960 in 1892 placed him fourth on the list of highest earners behind La Fleche, Orme and the two-year-old Milford.

== Stud career ==
Sir Hugo was not a success at stud. His best achievement was to sire the mare Ravello, who produced the 2000 Guineas winner Sweeper. His last known foals were conceived in 1906. Sir Hugo died in February 1910 at the Jockey Hall Stud in Curragh.

== Pedigree ==
Pedigree of Sir Hugo (GB), chestnut stallion, 1889
Sire Wisdom (GB) 1873	Blinkhoolie; 1864	Rataplan*	The Baron*
Sire Wisdom (GB) 1873	Blinkhoolie; 1864	Rataplan*	Pocahontas*
Sire Wisdom (GB) 1873	Blinkhoolie; 1864	Queen Mary	Gladiator
Sire Wisdom (GB) 1873	Blinkhoolie; 1864	Queen Mary	Plenipotentiary mare
Sire Wisdom (GB) 1873	Aline; 1862	Stockwell	The Baron*
Sire Wisdom (GB) 1873	Aline; 1862	Stockwell	Pocahontas*
Sire Wisdom (GB) 1873	Aline; 1862	Jeu d’Esprit	Flatcatcher
Sire Wisdom (GB) 1873	Aline; 1862	Jeu d’Esprit	Extempore
Dam Manoeuvre (GB) 1874	Lord Clifden; 1860	Newminster	Touchstone
Dam Manoeuvre (GB) 1874	Lord Clifden; 1860	Newminster	Beeswing
Dam Manoeuvre (GB) 1874	Lord Clifden; 1860	The Slave	Melbourne
Dam Manoeuvre (GB) 1874	Lord Clifden; 1860	The Slave	Volley
Dam Manoeuvre (GB) 1874	Quick March; 1863	Rataplan*	The Baron*
Dam Manoeuvre (GB) 1874	Quick March; 1863	Rataplan*	Pocahontas*
Dam Manoeuvre (GB) 1874	Quick March; 1863	Qui Vive	Voltigeur
Dam Manoeuvre (GB) 1874	Quick March; 1863	Qui Vive	Mrs Ridgway (Family: 19)

- Sir Hugo's pedigree contains a notable amount of inbreeding. He was inbred 3 × 3 to Rataplan, meaning that this horse appears twice in the third generation of his pedigree. Also in the third generation was Rataplan's full brother Stockwell. Sir Hugo was therefore inbred 4 × 4 × 4 to both The Baron and Pocahontas.
