= 1901 Boston Marathon =

Footrace in Boston, Massachusetts, USA

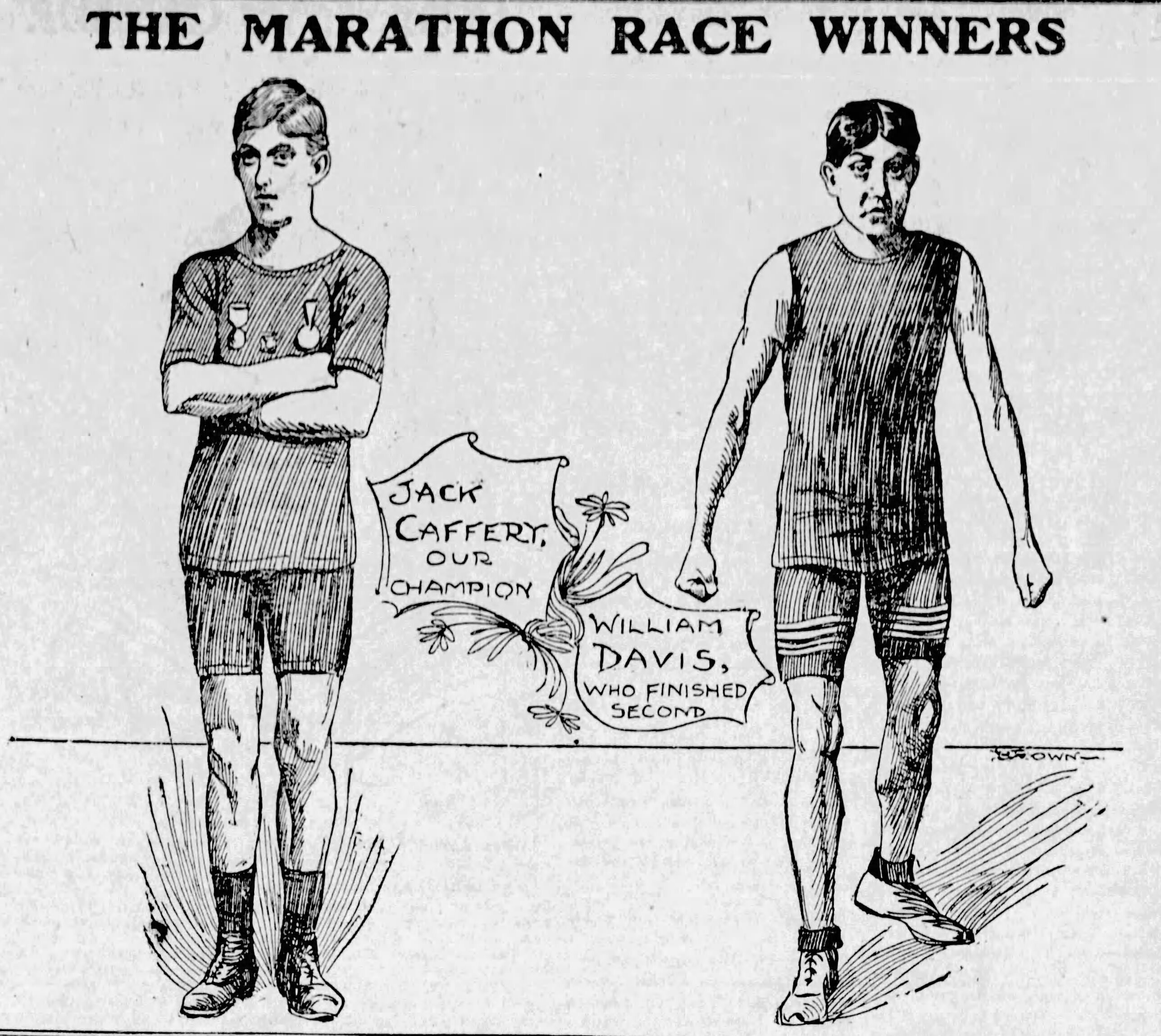
- Drawing of the top two finishers in The Hamilton Spectator
- Location: Ashland to Boston, Massachusetts, U.S.
- Date: April 19, 1901
- Competitors: 36

Champions
- Men: Jack Caffery (2:29:23)

The 1901 Boston Marathon was the fifth edition of the marathon race from Ashland to Boston, Massachusetts, United States on April 19, 1901. The event was organized by the Boston Athletic Association (B.A.A.). Rather than the modern marathon distance of 26.2 miles (42.2 km), the distance was officially 25 miles (40 km), though it has since been measured to be about 23.1–23.9 miles (37.2–38.5 km). About 25,000 spectators lined the course, many of them following and cheering on their preferred runners for significant stretches as they passed.

Jack Caffery of Canada repeated as champion, improving his course record from the previous year by a further 10 minutes to 2 hours, 29 minutes, 33 seconds and becoming the first person to win the Boston Marathon two years in a row. His compatriot William Davis, a Mohawk Canadian, finished runner-up and Sammy Mellor finished third.

== Background ==
1901 Boston Marathon route

The route will be as follows: Start at bridge, one mile behind Central House, on the main road at Ashland, down across the Boston & Albany railroad tracks to trolley track through to South Framingham, Natick, Wellesley, Newton Lower Falls, to great signboards; take Washington street on the left to Commonwealth avenue to Reservoir, which will be on your right; keep right to Beacon street, to junction of Beacon and Commonwealth avenue, bear right through the park to the right of Commonwealth avenue to Exteter street; turn right, up Exteter street to the B. A. A. clubhouse, where you will stop.

— Boston Evening Transcript, 15 April 1901

Following the first modern Olympic marathon at the 1896 Athens Olympics, the first American marathon race was held in fall 1896 from Stamford, Connecticut to New York City. According to the Hamilton Spectator, the Bostonians who competed claimed they were drugged, and John McDermott of New York won the race.

The first Boston Marathon was held one year later in 1897, and it was also won by McDermott. The race was credited with establishing interest in marathon running in America. That momentum continued through to the 1900 Boston Marathon, which broke the all-time participation record with the help of a new Canadian delegation led by winner Jack Caffrey.

For the 1901 race, it was expected that participation would exceed the 1900 edition, with race manager John Graham expecting several top entries. The Canadians were to be represented by Jack Caffery, Fred Hughson, William Davis, and 1900 Boston Marathon runner-up Billy Sherring from Hamilton, Ontario. On April 15, Sherring withdrew from the race with what was variously described as a sore knee or a sickness. The rest of the Canadians arrived a week before the race, and also on April 15 Caffrey raced Tom Kanaly in a cross-country tune-up in Boston, finishing fourth despite a seven-minute handicap. People in Cambridge favored Ronald MacDonald to win the 1901 Boston Marathon, as his recent 19-mile performance was 6 minutes better than that of Caffrey.

A total of 31 entries were received as of April 17, each runner to be accompanied by two bicycle riders to attend to their needs during the race. The top eight placers were to be awarded prizes, with a "souvenir" awarded to all finishers. A list of 33 entrants and a course description were published by the Boston Evening Transcript four days before the race, with that list being updated to 41 entrants as of the eve of the race.

== The race ==
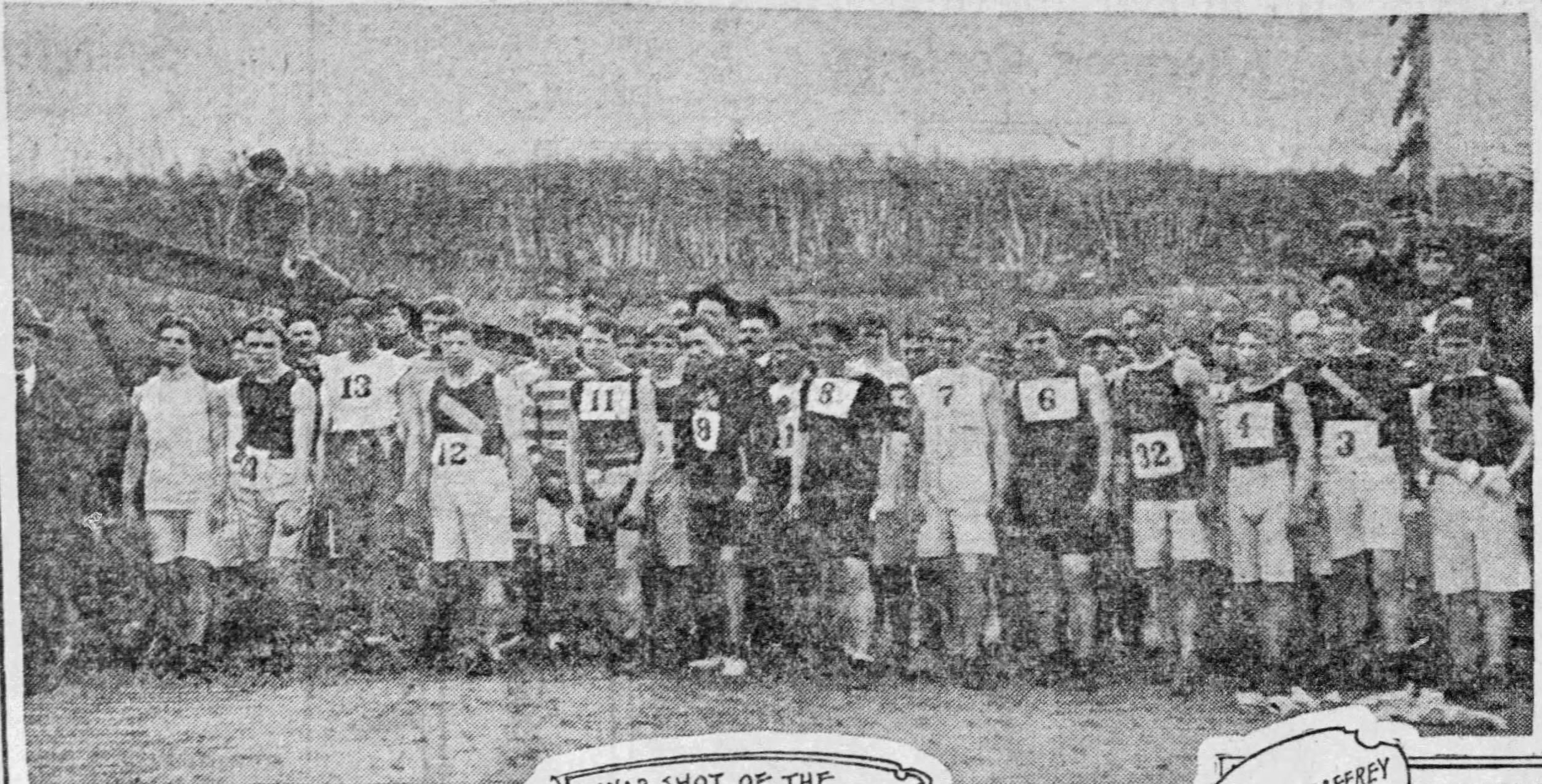
The starting line of the race, as captured by The Boston Globe

The race started at 12 pm local time, with conditions described as favorable with no wind. Fred Hughson of the Hamilton Y.M.C.A. and Jack Caffery (also of Hamilton, Ontario) took the early lead. The first mile was reportedly covered in 4 minutes and 40 seconds, a pace that only five runners in history have averaged across a full marathon as of 2024. By the railroad tracks in Ashland center, Hughson led with Caffery close behind and both leading C. Crimmins from Cambridgeport Gym by 50 yards (46 m).

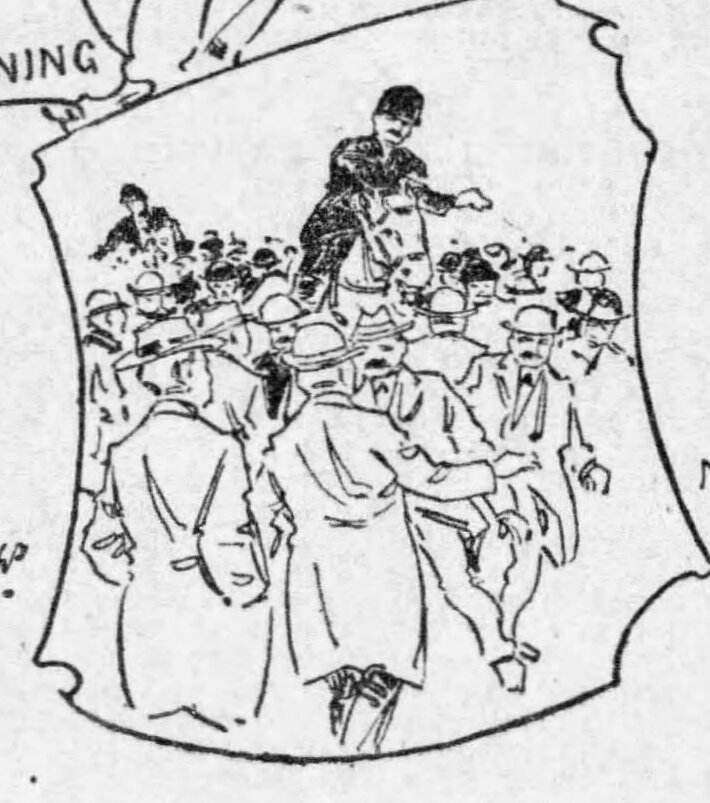
Mounted police clearing the way through the crowds during the race

This pace proved to be too fast for some of the anticipated favorites, including John Vrazanas of Greece who was not seen again after the first few miles. Crimmins trailed in third place, as William Davis led T. J. Hicks in fourth and fifth. There was little course control: according to the Globe "hundreds" of bicyclists tailed the leading runners encumbered by cars, horses, and children.

As the race advanced through Framingham and Natick, Hughson had built up a lead but was still closely tailed by Caffery. 45 minutes in, Hughson passed the Natick town hall about 100 yards (91 m) ahead of Caffery. Ronald MacDonald at this point was 75 yards (69 m) behind Caffery, and Sammy Mellor and Davis were running in fourth and fifth 1/3 mile (0.54 km) behind MacDonald.

The race dynamic began to shift as the runners approached Wellesley. Caffery overtook Hughson on the Wellsley Hills steep incline. At this point a horse became frightened and ran into the street ahead of the runners, but a bicyclist grabbed the bridles and was able to stop the horse before any runners were injured.

With Caffery now in the lead, the race progressed to Newton Lower Falls as Caffery extended his lead over Hughson to about 150 yards (140 m). By this point, MacDonald had passed Crimmins and was in 3rd place, leading Crimmins (who was described as an "unknown proposition") by about 1/2 mile (0.80 km).

Caffery passed 15 miles (24 km) in 1 hour and 21 minutes – 9 minutes faster than last year's split – with a significant lead. Hughson was still in runner-up position, but at this point he was visibly struggling and onlookers predicted he would not finish the race. MacDonald was 1/3 mile (0.54 km) behind, and Crimmins was 220 yards (200 m) behind MacDonald in fourth position.

At Waban, MacDonald passed an ailing Hughson and was gaining ground on the leader Caffery. With nine miles to the finish, MacDonald had advanced to just 1/3 mile (0.54 km) behind Caffery. Meanwhile eventual runner-up William Davis was still only in fifth place, behind Caffery, MacDonald, Hughson, and Crimmins. Davis began to speed up, taking advantage of an incline on Cedar Street in West Newton to pass Crimmins and eventually Hughson.

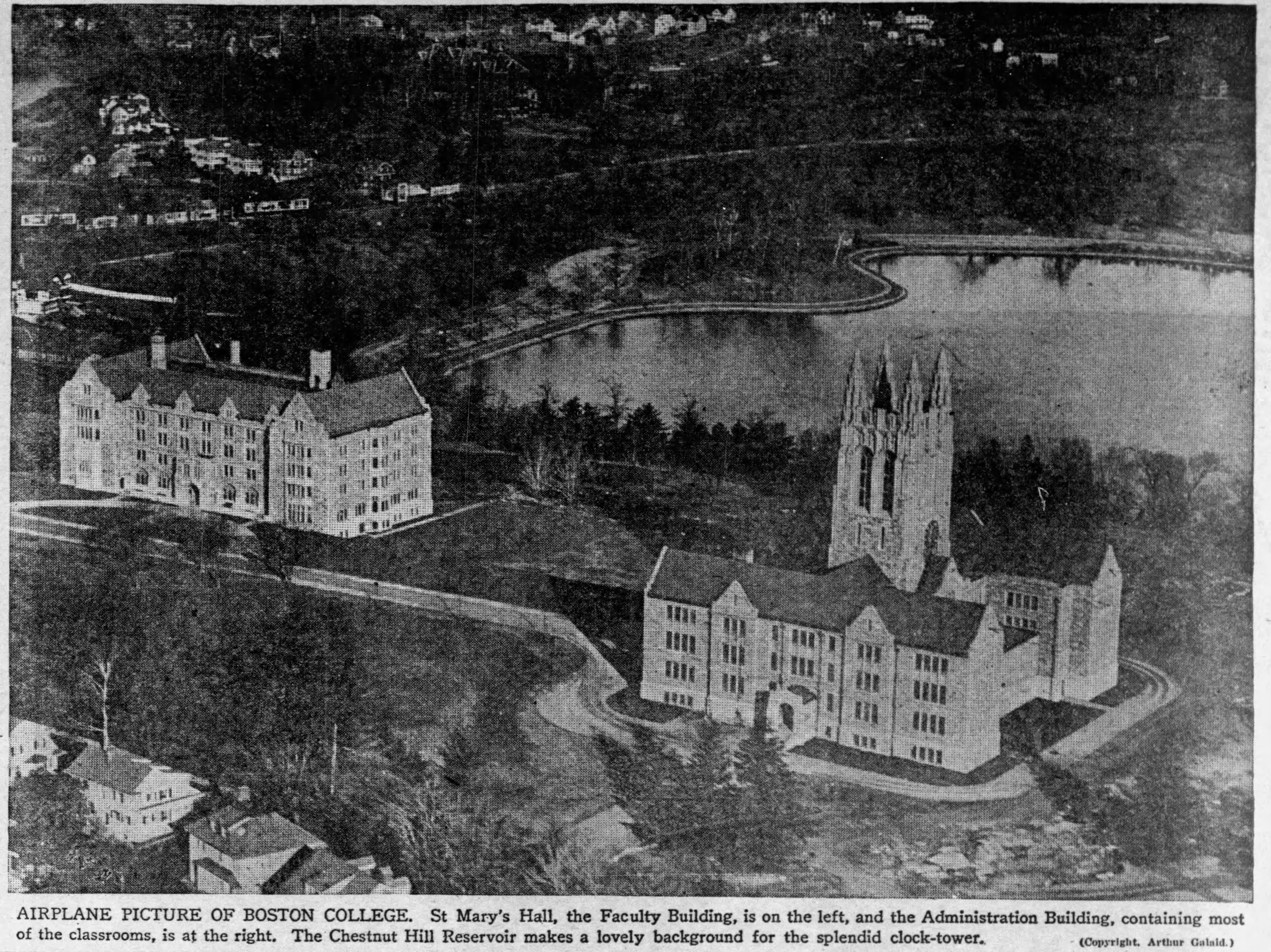
A view of the Chestnut Hill Reservoir in 1923, where a large crowd of spectators watched the runners

Davis, now in third, caught up to MacDonald over the next mile, and MacDonald was alerted to his presence by the "Indian warhoops and catcalls" being made by the crowd of cyclist fans following Davis. MacDonald's followers tried to encourage him to maintain position, but nonetheless Davis passed MacDonald on a downhill en route to the Chestnut Hill Reservoir. Behind them, Hughson struggled significantly, falling on the road several times, and he was eventually brought off in a carriage and did not finish the race.

When the reservoir was reached, a "vast crowd" of spectators cheered on Caffery and Davis, then about a mile back. There were so many onlookers on the reservoir that they blocked the runners, with some having to make a detour to pass by the pedestrians lined 20 or 30 deep. Confusion was heightened after a "young man clad in running togs" slid in from one of the side streets and joined the race behind Caffery. The young man fooled many of the spectators before he dropped out.

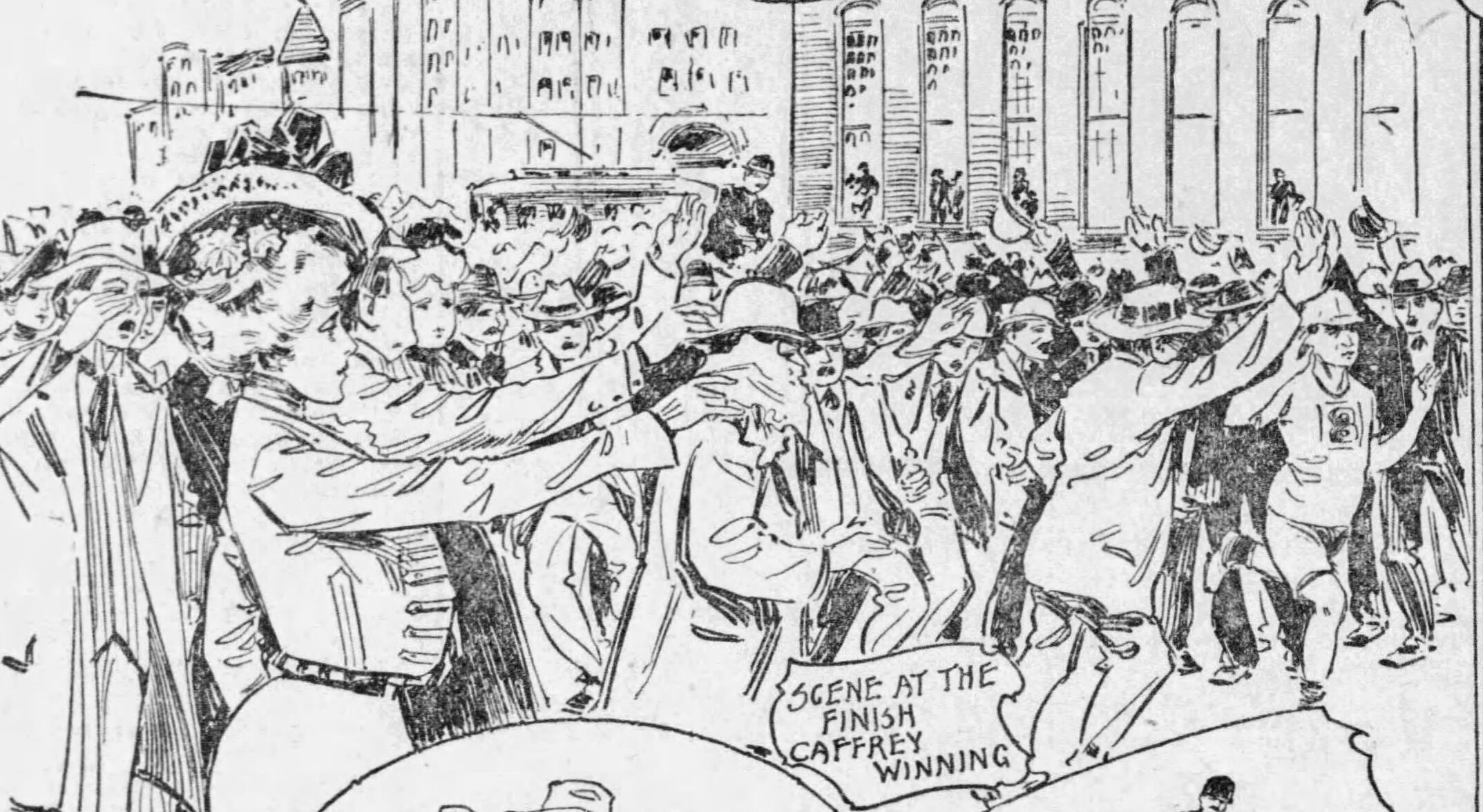
Illustration of the scene when Caffery won the race, showing spectators storming the course

Despite Davis' efforts, the gap was unsurmountable as Caffery finished first, breaking his own course record by about ten minutes in 2 hours, 29 minutes, and 33 seconds. Spectators stormed the course to embrace Caffery. Davis and Mellor followed, with Crimmins and Hicks taking the fourth and fifth positions. The race continued for about an hour after Davis finished, after which the final competitor completed the distance.

== Ronald MacDonald poisoning allegations ==
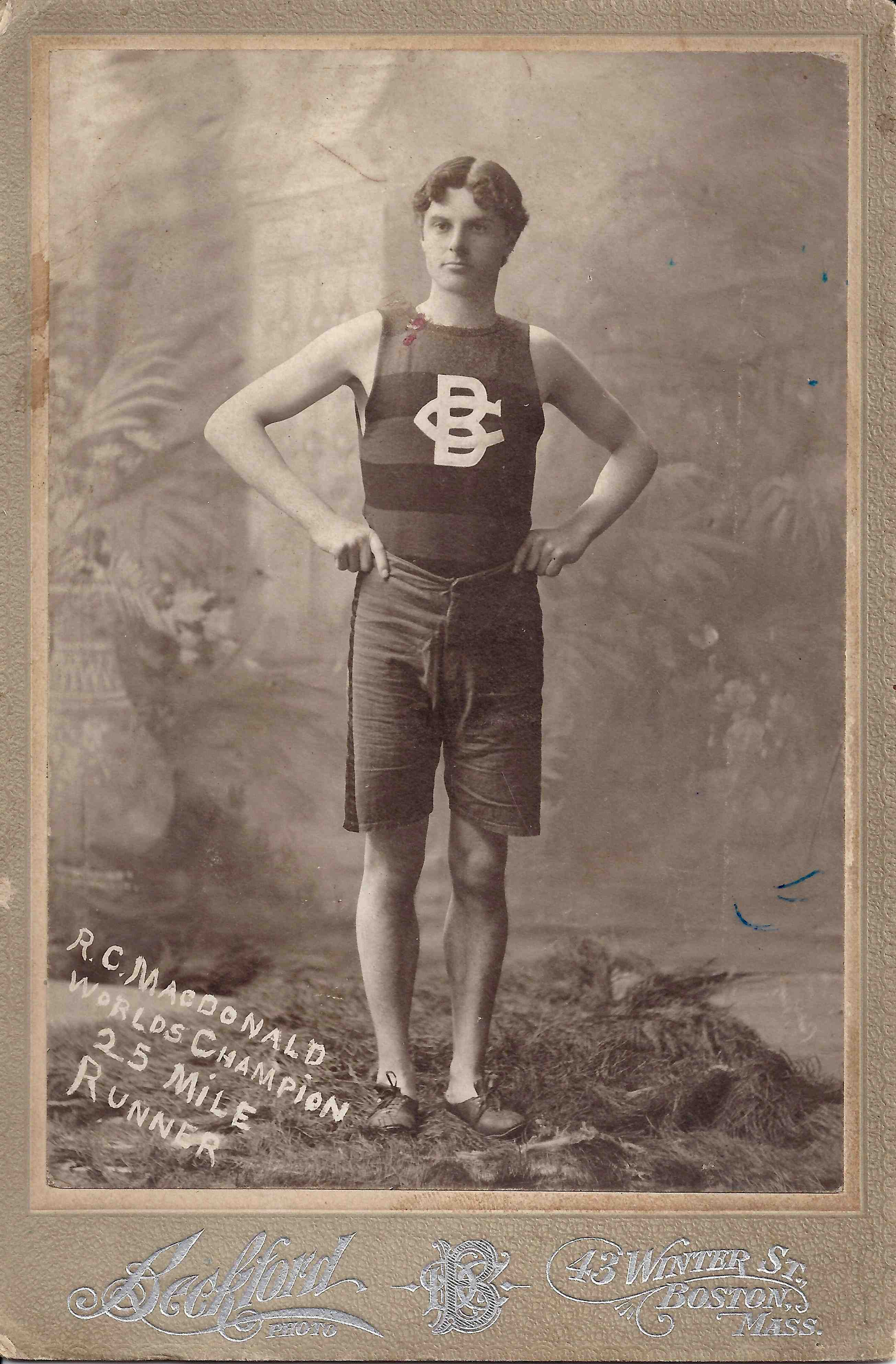
Ronald MacDonald in 1898

With about five miles remaining, 1898 Boston Marathon champion Ronald MacDonald was about 90 seconds behind leader Jack Caffery, a distance which MacDonald thought he could easily make up. However, MacDonald began to tire after dabbing himself with what he thought was a water sponge, which he received from his brother via a mobile canteen driven by a bicycle rider.

Showing visible signs of fatigue, MacDonald was approached by Dr. J. S. Thompson of East Cambridge, who offered him 1/30th of a grain of strychnine in pill form, intended to "strengthen his heart" (anti-doping rules did not yet exist). The pills appeared to have the opposite effect, and MacDonald soon collapsed and did not finish the race.

MacDonald was carried home, where he was bedridden for several days. At 10 p.m. the night of the race Dr. Thompson visited and said, "on examining the sponge used in wiping the face of the runner I found a very strong odor of chloroform. That was seven hours after he had used the sponge, showing that the dose must have been a powerful one". Dr. Thompson further stated, "The only reason I can see was that he was a dangerous man, and some one wanted to get him out of the race. I think the canteen of the soldier bicycle rider must have been tampered with at Ashland, and the drug inserted there."

The Canadian delegation was not receptive to the poisoning idea, believing it to have cheapened Caffery's win. They complained that "little, if any, attention was shown to" the Canadians and of the Boston Athletic Association's perceived exclusivity. They also noted that although MacDonald was widely celebrated in Boston, the actual bettors did not place much money on him. The Hamilton Spectator stated, "A better excuse than this will have to be found for MacDonald's defeat."

== Legacy ==
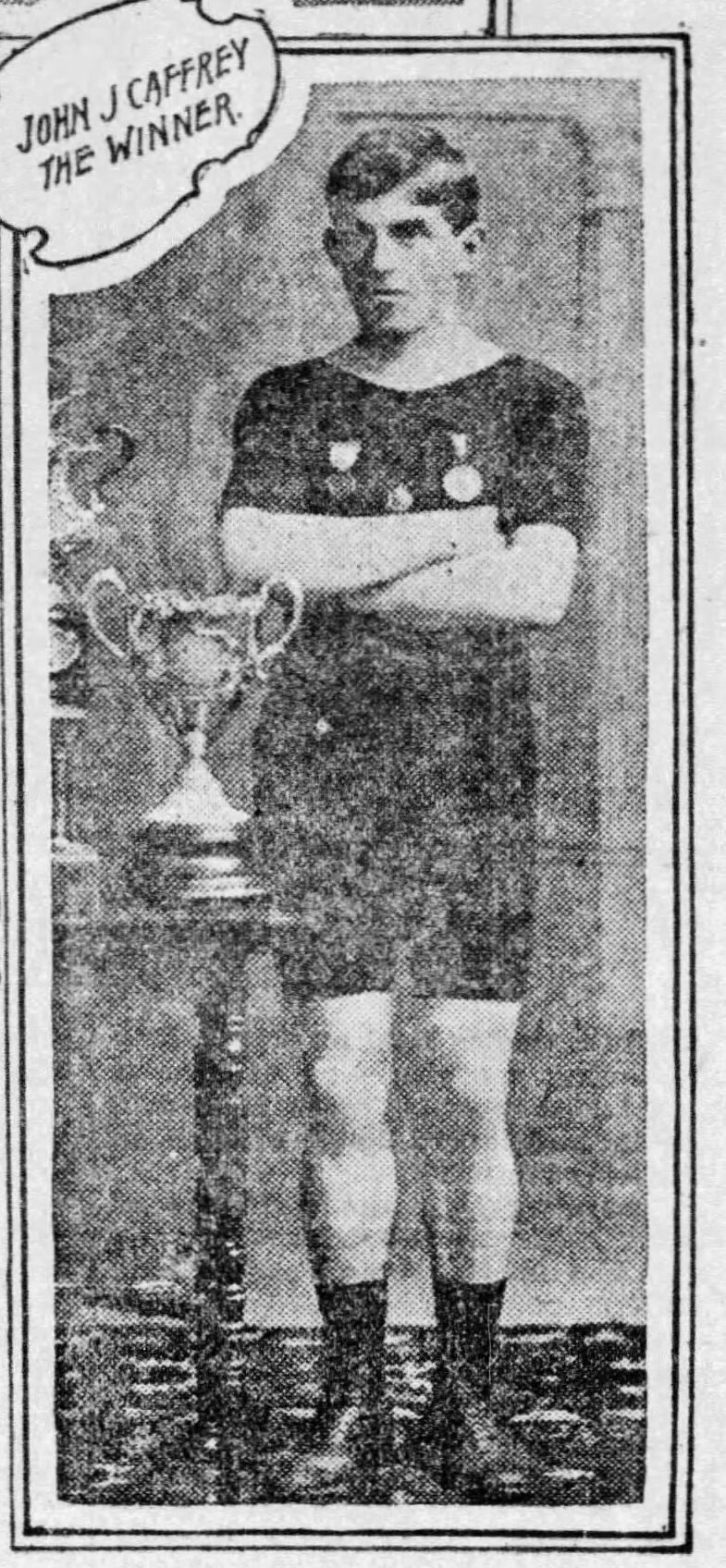
Photograph of Caffery, the repeat winner

Being a member of the Mohawk people, William Davis was the first indigenous American to medal at a Boston Marathon, finishing second behind his countryman Caffery. A native of Hagersville, Ontario, Davis' running form was described as not suitable to "please the experts". He went on to coach Tom Longboat, winner of the 1908 Boston Marathon. John Vrazanis of Greece was the first Boston Marathon runner from outside North America, although he did not finish the race.

Caffery's win and course record was a significant highlight in his athletic career. He was aided by Tom Kanaly, then a runner himself, who followed Caffery on a tandem bike. Walter C. Kelly wrote in the Buffalo Courier, "The Marathon race of 1901 is a thing of the past. Like many other athletic events, it will now take its place in the annals of the athletic almanac. It will be forgotten, as athletic events are, but the performance of J. J. Caffery [sic] will long be remembered by the racing enthusiasts who long to see the runners reel off mile after mile until they have covered the quarter of a century".

== Results ==
There were 36 reported participants, but not all names and times were recorded.

Results of the marathon
Pos.	Athlete	Residence	Time
1st place, gold medalist(s)	Jack Caffery	Canada	2:29:23 3/5
2nd place, silver medalist(s)	William Davis	Canada (Mohawk people)	2:34:45 2/5
3rd place, bronze medalist(s)	Samuel A. Mellor Jr.	New York	2:44:34 2/5
4	C. Crimmins	Massachusetts	2:47:15 3/5
5	Thomas J. Hicks	Massachusetts	2:52:32 3/5
6	John C. Lorden	Massachusetts	2:55:49 3/5
7	James McAuliffe	Massachusetts	2:56:44 3/5
8	E. Grusell Jr.	Massachusetts	3:02:02 4/5
AC	J. J. Kennedy	Massachusetts	Unknown
AC (Note: Listed as 7th place in 2:55:49 3/5 in The Hamilton Spectator and B.A.A.'s results archive, but not listed in the original Boston Globe report.)	Patrick Lorden	Massachusetts	Unknown
	John Vrazanis	Greece	DNF
	Ronald MacDonald	Massachusetts	DNF
	Fred W. Hughson	Canada	DNF
