= 1898 Boston Marathon =

Footrace in Boston, Massachusetts, USA

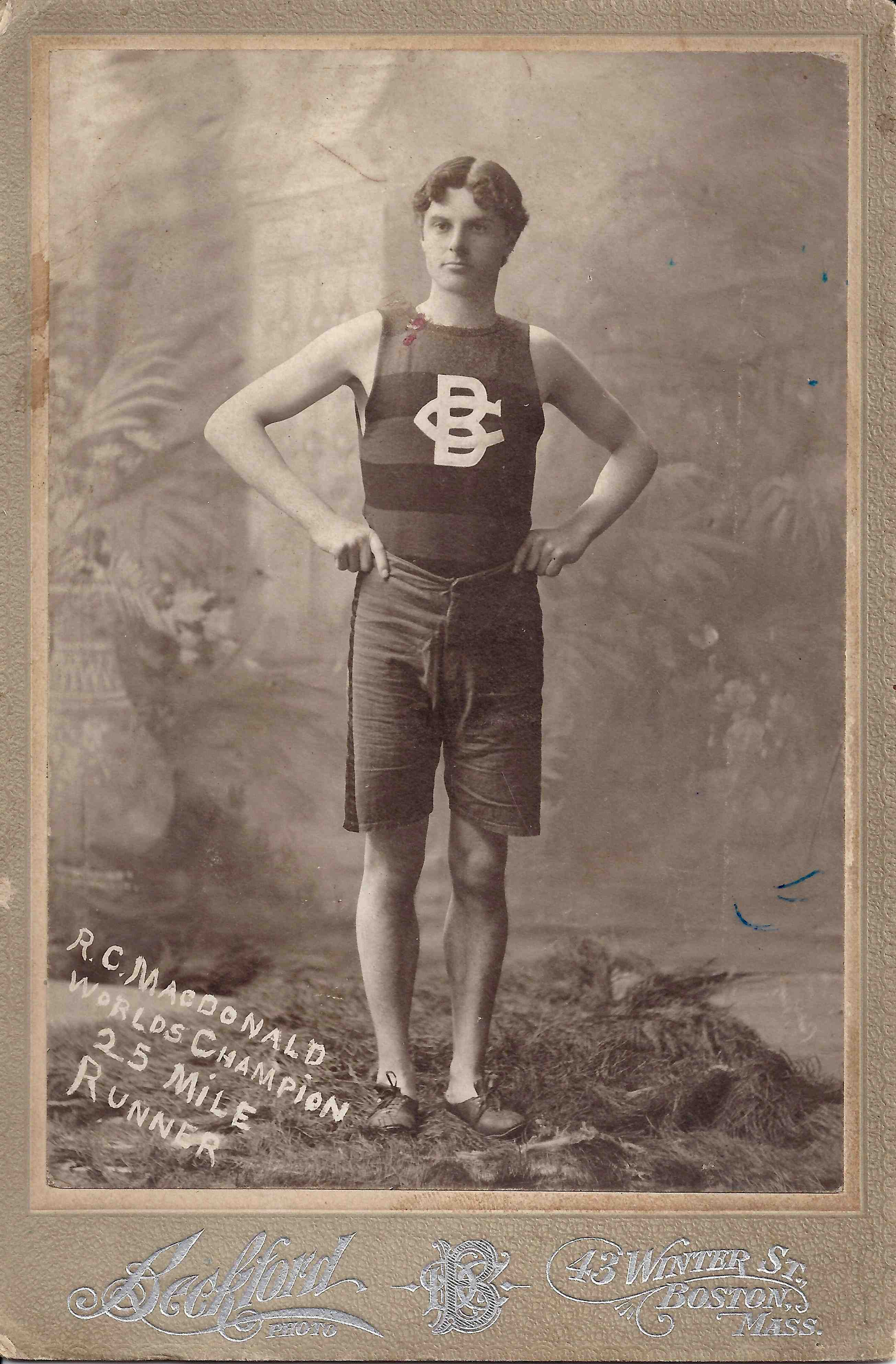
- Winner Ronald MacDonald
- Venue: Ashland to Boston, Massachusetts, U.S.
- Date: April 19, 1898 (Patriots' Day)
- Competitors: 24

Champions
- Men: Ronald MacDonald (2:42)

The 1898 Boston Marathon, contemporarily referred to as the Boston Athletic Association's annual marathon race, was the second edition of the marathon race that became known as the Boston Marathon. It took place on April 19, 1898, from Ashland to Boston, Massachusetts, over a distance of 24.5 miles (39.4 km).

A contemporary report in The Boston Globe stated 24 runners started the race, although 25 entrants were listed. The Boston Athletic Association states there were 24 runners.

== Results ==
The top five finishers were:

Position	Athlete	Representing	Time
1	Ronald MacDonald†	Cambridgeport Gymnasium Athletic Association	2:42
2	Hamilton Gray	St. George A.C., New York	2:45
3	R. A. McLean	East Boston Athletic Association	2:48:02
4	John McDermott‡	Pastime A.C., New York	2:54:17 2/5
5	Lawrence Brignolia	Bradford Boat Club, Cambridge, Massachusetts	2:55:49 2/5

† MacDonald, from Nova Scotia, became the first Canadian winner of the race.

‡ McDermott was the defending champion from 1897.

Dick Grant also competed and finished in seventh place.
