= Dick Grant =

Canadian long-distance runner

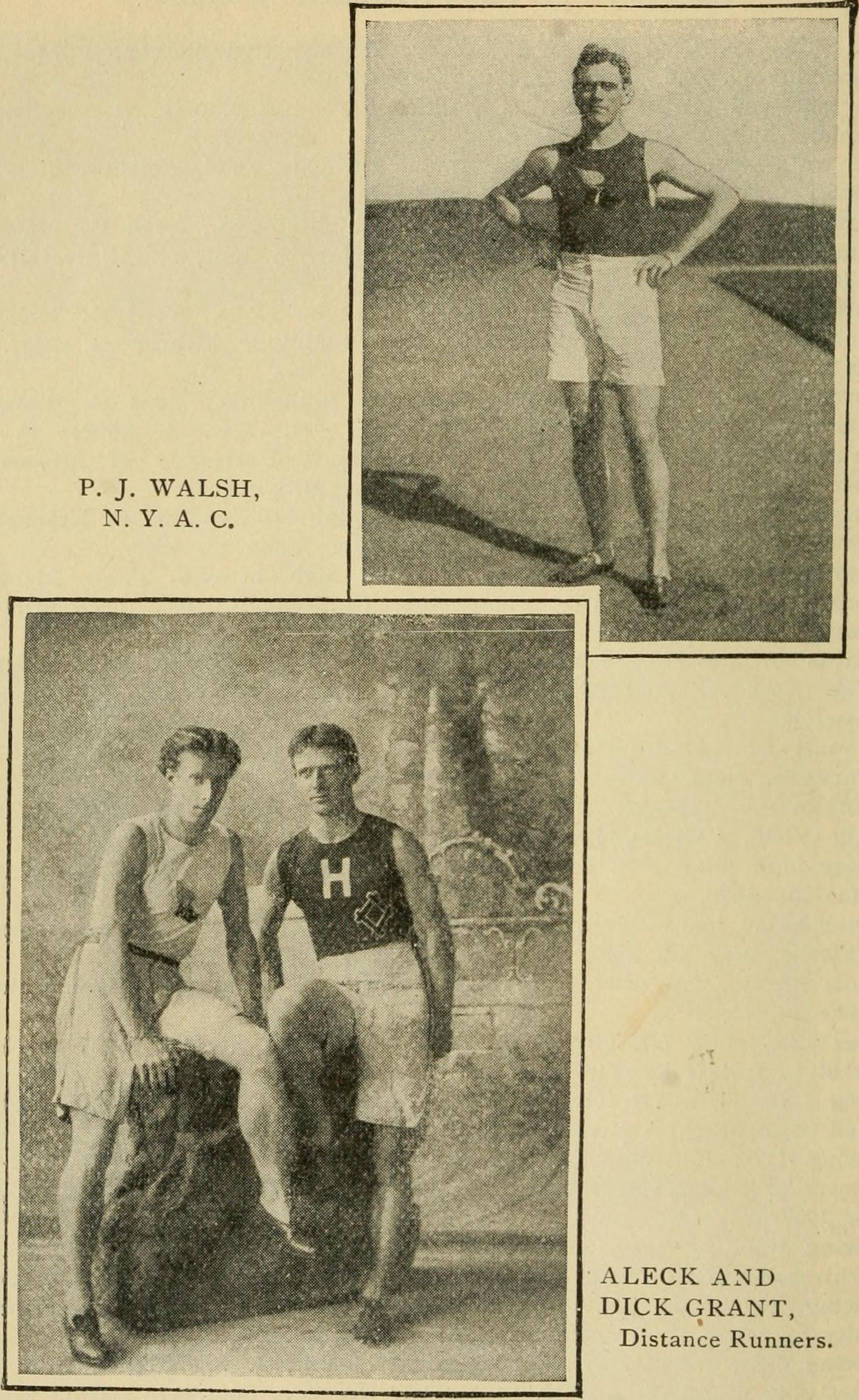
P. J. Walsh, Dick and Alexander Grant, as depicted in Spalding's official athletic almanac (1900)

Richard Grant (August 3, 1870 – January 9, 1958) was a Canadian track and field athlete who competed at the 1900 Summer Olympics in Paris, France for the United States. He also competed in the first four Boston Marathons, one of only two athletes (the other being Lawrence Bragnolia) to have done so. In later life he lived in Habana, Cuba and wrote the words and music (with the collaboration of others) to several Presbyterian hymns.

== Biography ==
=== Early life ===
Grant was the son of a Presbyterian minister, born in the small farming community of Dufferin, in Haldimand County, Ontario, about three miles east of the Six Nations reserve where Tom Longboat lived. The community no longer exists, although it continued to act as a New York Central Railway stop before that line was decommissioned. As a result, Grant's birthplace is sometimes incorrectly attributed to other locations in Canada with the same name. The family moved to St. Mary's, Perth County, Ontario in the 1880s. Grant attended the University of Toronto as an undergraduate, and was a member of the Toronto Lacrosse Club. He then attended Harvard University Medical School in Cambridge, Massachusetts, beginning about 1895, and enrolled in the track team there as a miler, running 4:25 for the distance. Grant's education at Harvard was self-funded, and he had to work in order to earn his tuition. His enrollment at the medical school had frequent interruptions as a result.

=== Athletics ===
Grant entered the inaugural Boston Marathon in 1897 with a solid background in track racing, but without having previously engaged in any long runs. His entry contravened orders he had received from his track team at Harvard, which wanted him to be fresh for a dual meet with the University of Pennsylvania. He was the only man in a field of eighteen runners without a handler accompanying him on a bicycle to provide him with water and to attend to his needs. Grant nonetheless took the lead immediately. He was joined by cross-country runner Hamilton Gray from New York City, and they shared the lead for about twelve miles until John J. McDermott caught the pair on the downhill into Newton Lower Falls. Gray stopped to walk, but Grant gave chase for a mile until the base of the next hill was reached. There, Grant walked to the top of the hill. Seeing a street-watering cart, used to keep the dust down on the dirt streets, he asked the driver to run water over him. Once his legs had cooled down, he tried to run again, but his feet were too blistered to continue, and he dropped out with about nine miles to go. McDermott continued on to win the race. He was effusive in his praise for Grant; "He is the hardest man I ever beat," he said. "He held me for a mile, although he was all pumped out. If he had trained for the race he would have given me a hard race. As it was it was hard enough to shake him. He ran the pluckiest race I ever saw." Grant had lost twelve pounds in weight over the race, and his feet were so blistered he was unable to walk for several days afterward.

Grant returned to the Marathon the following year, having taken leave of absence from Harvard and having joined the Cambridgeport Gymnasium Association. He finished in seventh place with a time of 3:08:55.

Grant's best result at the Boston Marathon came in 1899. Now running for the Knickerbocker Athletic Club of New York, Grant was once more in the early lead, which he held for about sixteen miles, but the runners had to cope with a significant headwind. Lawrence Bragnolia, a 161-pound blacksmith, was always close behind, and his stocky frame was better suited to coping with the headwind than was Grant's. The two entered into a spirited battle in the Newton Hills, with Bragnolia ultimately prevailing. Grant finished half a mile and three minutes behind Bragnolia, with a time of 2:57:46. Bragnolia's remarks after the race echoed McDermott's two years before; Grant was the pluckiest runner he had ever encountered, and knowing that he would be a bad man to beat, decided to "run him out" in the first fifteen miles, and was surprised when at the eighteenth mile he was not then sure of victory.

Grant's last appearance at the Boston Marathon was in 1900. The race was noted for the entry of a team of five runners from Hamilton, Ontario, including Jack Caffery and Billy Sherring, who led from the start. Grant followed the Hamilton runners closely, leading the local contingent. He worked his way through the Hamilton runners, taking second place and approaching within 100 yards of Jack Caffery, the leader. But turning onto Commonwealth Avenue at about the sixteen-mile mark, Caffery put in a burst of speed that Grant could not match. Grant had overextended himself in his attempt to catch Caffery, and was passed by several runners in the Newton Hills. He finished in eighth place with a time of 3:13:57. Caffery set a course record.

Canada did not form an Olympic Committee until 1904, and so when Canadian expatriates Dick Grant and Ronald McDonald entered the Marathon at the 1900 Olympic Games at Paris, along with Arthur Newton, they represented the United States. Only seven out of seventeen entrants finished the race, held on July 19; Newton was fifth, and Grant and McDonald, who ran together for most of the race, filled the last two positions, although reports disagree as to the order of their finishes. The last finisher, whoever that might be, had a time of about 4:24. The race was marred by suggestions of course cutting by the leaders, and McDonald later claimed that only he and Grant actually ran the whole course.

The Olympic race was Grant's last marathon, but he continued to race at shorter distances. He left the Harvard Medical School in 1903, and in 1908 accepted a position as track and field coach at the University of Minnesota at Minneapolis. When the First World War broke out in 1914, Grant attempted to enlist in the Canadian Expeditionary Force, but was rejected because of his age. In 1916 he accepted an appointment as director of athletics at the University of Havana in Cuba. He later became chief of the Department of Athletics in the Cuban Government.

=== Family ===
Grant married Edith Hutchings in 1909. She was born at St. Mary's, was eighteen years younger than Grant, and was working in Toronto as a stenographer. They had five children born in Minneapolis, Toronto, and Havana. Edith and the children returned to Canada in 1926.

Grant had four siblings. An older brother, Rev. William Harvey Grant, served as a missionary at Henan, China for over fifty years. A younger brother, Alexander Grant, was an Olympian runner and US champion in a range of middle-distance and distance events.

=== Later life ===
Grant returned to Canada from Cuba in 1947 after having lost his sight; he lived for a while with his sister Anna McIlwraith and her family at Aurora, Illinois, but US Immigration deemed him Liable to become a Public Charge (LPC) and denied him Permanent Residence status in that country. He died in 1958 at St. Catherine's, Ontario.

=== Hymns ===
Grant, a Presbyterian like his father, wrote the words and music for several hymns, the following of which have been found:

- God's Constant Love. Published 1941, Habana, Cuba. Words and music by Dr. Dick Grant and harmonized by Fritz (Federico) Kramer. Dedicated to "Mrs. Chiang Kai Shek."
- Braden's Victory Hymn Triumphant. Published 1942, Habana, Cuba. Words and music by Dr. Dick Grant and harmonized by Federico Kramer. Dedicated to Spruille Braden, Honorable Ambassador of the U.S.A. to Cuba. Written in Holy Trinity Cathedral, Habana during the Armistice service, November 11, 1941, "and caused by the patriotic address and the inspiring presence and personality of Mr. Braden".
- Christmas Gifts for a King. Published 1944, Habana, Cuba. Words and music by Miss Antoinette Bandré and Dr. Dick Grant and harmonized by Federico Kramer. Written in 1928 and first published in the Habana Evening Post that year. First sung by Grant at the Baptist Temple in Habana, with Miss Bandré at the piano. Dedicated to President Franklin D. Roosevelt and his wife Eleanor, May 19 1943.
