= Lawrence Brignolia =

American long-distance runner

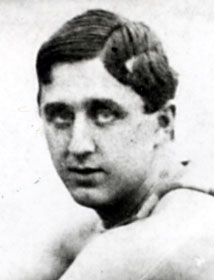
- Brignolia circa 1900
- Born: 15 April 1876; Boston, Massachusetts, U.S.
- Died: 13 February 1958 (aged 81); Boston, Massachusetts, U.S.
- Education: St. Mary's of the Annunciation, Cambridge, Massachusetts
- Occupation: Blacksmith
- Known for: Marathon running
- Spouses: Nellie Eagan; Annie Lynch (née Willard)
- Children: 2
- Honors: National Italian American Sports Hall of Fame (2000)

Lawrence Joseph Brignolia, sometimes Brignoli, (15 April 1876 – 13 February 1958) was an American long-distance runner and sculler of Italian descent. He won the third running of the Boston Marathon, in 1899. A 161-pound (73 kg) blacksmith, he remains the heaviest person ever to claim victory in the event. He was the only runner to finish each of the first three Boston Marathons, and one of two runners (the other being Dick Grant) who participated in each of the first four.

== Biography ==
Brignolia was born in April 1876 at Boston, Massachusetts, to Italian immigrants, the second of seven surviving children. His father worked as a street peddler, and the family lived at 35 Brookline Street, and later at 13 Rockwell Street, in Cambridge, Massachusetts. Brignolia attended school at St. Mary's of the Annunciation in Cambridgeport, and left school after the sixth grade. He was apprenticed to a horseshoer until he turned 15, at which point he took up the trade on his own.

In April 1897, he entered the inaugural Boston Marathon, which had a field of 15 runners. Ten runners finished, including Brignolia, who came eighth in a time of 4:06:12, 75 minutes behind the winner, John McDermott. He had trained for only a few days for the event, and had eaten a large breakfast before the race in preparation for the grind, and had gotten cramps while running.

In April 1898, he again entered the race, and even though he was unable to spare the time or money to train longer than one month for the marathon he finished in fifth place out of 24 entrants. His time, at 2:55:49, was a 75 minute improvement over the previous year, and was less than 14 minutes behind that of the winner, Ronald McDonald, who had run a time that was then considered a world best time for the marathon.

The next year, Brignolia entered the race under the coaching of John Bowles of the Cambridgeport Gymnasium Association, who had handled McDonald's winning run the year before. The runners in the race had to contend with a significant gale-like headwind, a circumstance that suited Brignolia’s stocky frame. He wore special shoes with light leather uppers that laced nearly to the toes, rubber heels, and leather soles. From the beginning, Brignolia fought for the lead with Dick Grant, also a veteran of the two previous marathons. Brignolia finally established a lead of 200 yards (180 m) at the top of the hill that would later be called Heartbreak Hill. By Coolidge Corner, the 22 1/2-mile (36.2 km) mark, Brignolia had an 11-minute lead on Grant and was five minutes ahead of McDonald’s year-old record. Here his handler, concerned about Brignolia’s lack of preparation, made him slow his pace in order to conserve his energy. At St. Mary’s Street, 1 1/2 miles (2.4 km) from the finish, he stepped on a loose stone, turning his ankle, and he collapsed to the ground. He was immediately rubbed down by his handlers for five minutes, after which he walked and ran to the finish line in a time of 2:54:38 to win the race. Grant finished three minutes later.

In 1900, Brignolia returned to defend his title, but the pace was furious from the beginning. Brignolia caught a side stitch after four miles. He was in 15th place after eight miles at West Natick, and dropped out after 11 miles (18 km). The race was won by Jack Caffery in a record time of 2:39:44.

Brignolia was also an oarsman who rowed front for the Bradford Boat Club; he also rowed singles sculls. On Labor Day in 1898, he entered the New England Amateur Rowing Association regatta on the Charles River, winning a novice singles race, and then 15 minutes later entering the intermediate race, finishing second by 1 1/2 boat lengths.

Brignolia married his first wife, Nellie Eagan of Cambridge, in 1899. The next year they had a child, Joseph, who died of gastro-enteritis at the age of two months. Another child, Lawrence Gerard, was born in 1905. He married his second wife, Annie Lynch (née Willard) in 1918; she brought two children by a previous marriage to the family. He continued living in Cambridge all his life, working as a master horseshoer until the 1930s when the need for that occupation fell into abeyance. He died at St. Elizabeth's Hospital in Boston in February 1958, following an automobile accident in the Brighton neighborhood of Boston. He weighed about 300 pounds (140 kg) at the time.

In 2000, Brignolia was elected to the National Italian American Sports Hall of Fame.
