= 1897 Boston Marathon =

Footrace in Boston, Massachusetts, USA

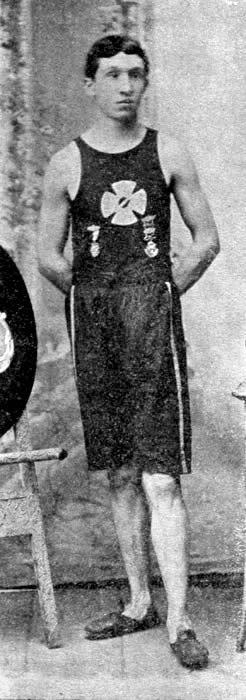
- Winner John McDermott
- Venue: Ashland to Boston, Massachusetts, U.S.
- Date: April 19, 1897 (Patriots' Day)
- Competitors: 15

Champions
- Men: John McDermott (2:55:10)

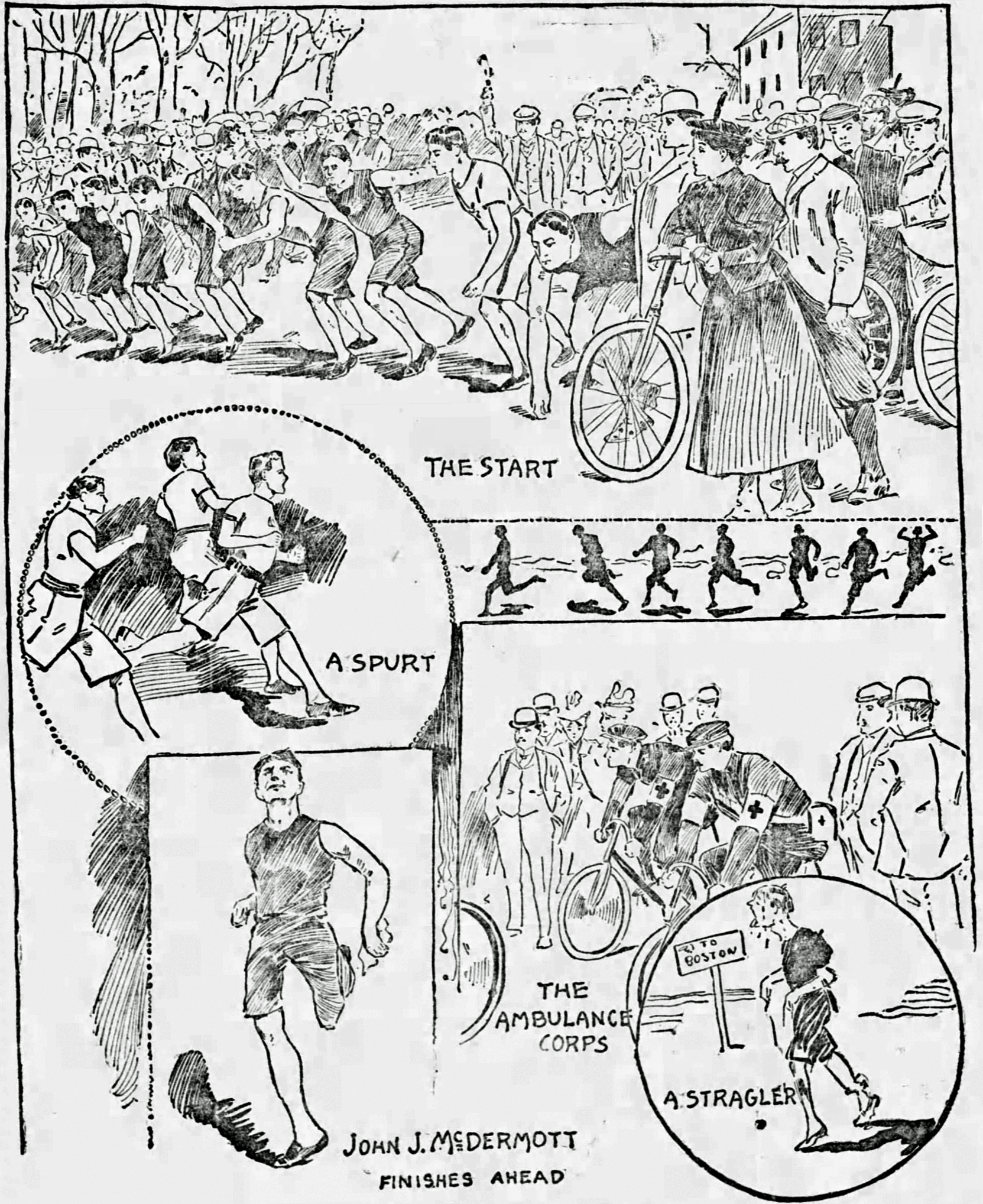
Boston Globe illustrations of the race

The 1897 Boston Marathon was the inaugural edition of the marathon race that became known as the Boston Marathon. At the time it was run, the race was not known by a proper name. It took place on April 19, 1897, and was run from Ashland to Boston, Massachusetts, over a distance of 24.5 miles (39.4 km).

A contemporary report in The Boston Globe stated 15 runners competed in the race, although 18 entrants were listed. The Boston Athletic Association states there were 15 runners.

== Results ==
Position	Athlete	Representing	Time
1	John McDermott	Pastime A.C., New York	2:55:10
2	J. J. Kiernan	St. Bartholomew A.C., New York	3:02:02
3	E. P. Rhell	Jamaica Plain, Boston	3:06:02
4	Hamilton Gray	St. George A.C., New York	3:11:37
5	H. T. Eggleston	Pastime A.C., New York	3:17:50
6	James Mason	Star A.C., New York	3:31:00
7	W. Ryan	South Boston A.A.	3:41:25
8	Lawrence Brignolia	Bradford Boat Club, Cambridge, Massachusetts	4:06:12
9	Harry Leonard†	Melrose, Massachusetts	4:08:00
10	A. T. Howe	Lowell, Massachusetts YMCA	4:10:00

† alias H. Franklin

Dick Grant of Harvard also ran in the race, but was one of multiple entrants who did not finish.
