= Ronald MacDonald (athlete) =

Canadian long-distance runner

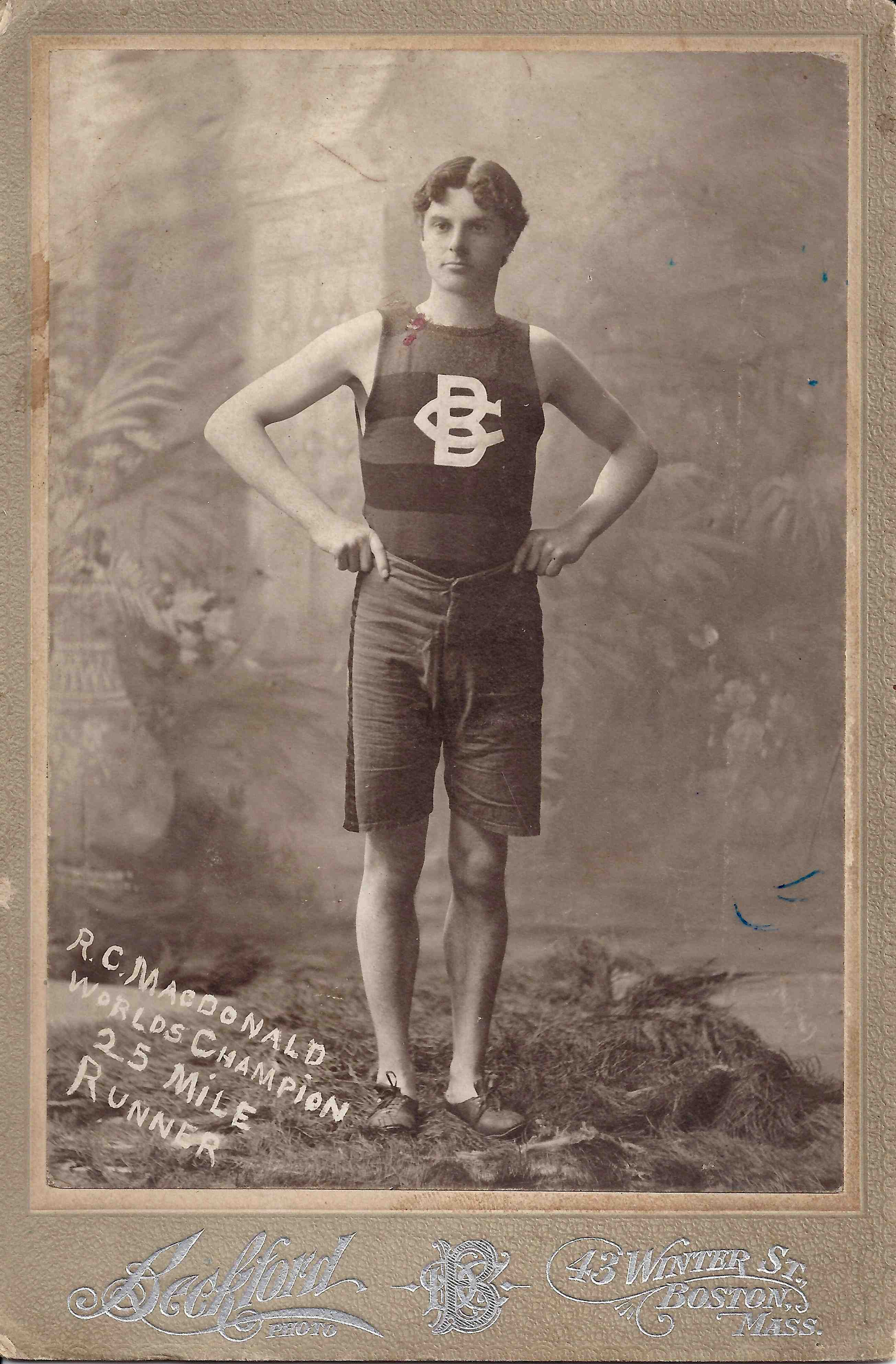
- Born: September 19, 1874; Fraser's Grant, Antigonish County, Nova Scotia, Canada
- Died: September 3, 1947 (aged 72); Antigonish, Nova Scotia, Canada
- Resting place: Heatherton, Nova Scotia
- Education: St. Francis Xavier University; Tufts Medical College
- Occupation: Physician
- Known for: Marathon running
- Spouse: Ada Pieroway
- Children: 5
- Honors: Nova Scotia Sports Hall of Fame (1979)

Ronald John MacDonald (September 19, 1874 (Note: The date of birth is obtained from the record of birth registrations compiled by the Government of Nova Scotia. Elsewhere -- specifically on his 1898 petition for US naturalization and also on his headstone -- the birth date is given as September 27, 1874. On his death certificate it is stated as September 27, 1875.) – September 3, 1947) was a Canadian runner, best known as the winner of the second Boston Marathon in 1898. He later became a successful physician in Nova Scotia.

== Early life ==
MacDonald was born in Fraser's Grant, Antigonish County, Nova Scotia on September 19, 1874. His father died at sea when MacDonald was twelve years old, after which his mother relocated the family to Cambridgeport, Massachusetts, where relatives were living. MacDonald worked as a telephone lineman for the New England Telephone and Telegraph Company, and later in the family lunch store on Cambridge Street. In 1895, he joined the Cambridgeport Gymnasium Association with his brother Alexander. In 1897, he enrolled at Boston College as a special student.

== Running ==
=== First marathon ===
On April 19, 1898, MacDonald was one of 24 runners who gathered in Ashland, Massachusetts, to start the second Boston Marathon. He was 5 feet 6 inches (1.68 m) tall and weighed 142 pounds (64 kg), and had curly light hair. It was his first marathon and he raced in bicycle shoes. MacDonald ran the race conservatively waiting for the leaders to fall off the pace. Till the half-way mark, he raced 2–3 miles (3.2–4.8 km) behind the leaders, then he started pushing the pace. He chased Hamilton Gray, the New York cross-country champion, through the downhills in the later part of the race and passed him in the last couple of miles. MacDonald ran the whole way without taking any fluids. He ended up finishing in 2:42, the fastest of 15 finishers, three minutes faster than Gray, 13 minutes faster than the previous year's time, and a time considered a world best at the time for a distance of about 25 miles (40 km). MacDonald and Gray shook hands after the race.

=== Olympic representation ===
MacDonald represented Canada at the 1900 Summer Olympics held in Paris. He ran the marathon, but finished the last of seven finishers. He complained that the top three runners, who were French, had cut the course, and that only he and an American actually completed the whole course.

=== Return to Boston ===
MacDonald returned to the 1901 Boston Marathon with confidence stating that he would win and break the record of Jack Caffery, another Canadian, who had run 2:39:44 the previous year. MacDonald was one of 42 runners that day, and ran as part of the top four for most of the race. Unfortunately, MacDonald was seized with cramps and had to retire from the race, reported to be due to a sponge soaked with chloroform he unknowingly accepted from a spectator.

MacDonald returned to the Boston Marathon in 1902. He and Sammy Mellor were favoured; MacDonald had finished 10 seconds faster than Mellor in the previous year's Thanksgiving Day 19-mile (31 km) Around-the-Bay Race in Hamilton, Ontario. MacDonald and Mellor ran side by side in Boston until the 12th mile. Unfortunately, after the half-way mark, in the Newton Hills, MacDonald had difficulties, walked for a while and retired from the race, which was won by Mellor in a time of 2:43:12.

In 1905, MacDonald was a handler for Boston Marathon runner Robert Fowler who ended up finishing third. Fowler blamed his handlers (presumably including MacDonald) for advising him to stay with Olympic gold medalist Tom Hicks, who ended up having a bad day.

== University ==
MacDonald returned to Nova Scotia in 1901 where he enrolled at St. Francis Xavier University in Antigonish as a pre-med student. He continued winning many races and setting Canadian and world records. In 1902, he organized the first indoor meet ever held in Eastern Canada. MacDonald also raced in the meet, winning the 3-mile (4.8 km) race in a time of 15:38, a new Canadian indoor record, and defeating John Lorden, a teammate from the Cambridgeport Gymnasium Association who won the Boston Marathon a year later. In 1903, he beat the winner of the 1899 Boston Marathon, Lawrence Brignolia, in a 5-mile (8.0 km) race. Later that year, he entered medical school at Tufts Medical College, graduating in 1907.

== Later life ==
After a year of postgraduate work at Harvard University, MacDonald accepted a position as a general practice physician in the Port au Port Peninsula of Newfoundland and he became a successful doctor practicing there and in Nova Scotia.

On August 18, 1909, MacDonald raced and won his last marathon in St. John's, Newfoundland, against his former teammate John Lorden on a six-lap-to-the-mile track at St. Bonaventure's College before 3,000 spectators. MacDonald was four laps behind at the 20-mile mark when Lorden "hit the wall." At the end, MacDonald finished 40 yards and 10 seconds ahead of Lorden, in a time of 3:07:50 over 25 miles (40 km). MacDonald wrote one of the first books on running, How to Train and Win a Marathon Race.

MacDonald lived and practiced on the Port au Port Peninsula for thirty years. When the limestone quarry at Aguathuna opened up, he accepted a position as doctor for the workers at the facility. In 1913, he married Ada Pieroway of St. Georges, Newfoundland, and they had five children. In 1938, he returned to Antigonish with his family to retire; he had gained a lot of weight due to diabetes, and his health had deteriorated. In 1942, he had a severe stroke; five years later he died at Antigonish on September 3, 1947. He is buried at Heatherton, Nova Scotia, a short distance from his birthplace.

MacDonald was part of the original inductees in the Nova Scotia Sports Hall of Fame for Track and Field in 1979.

== Records ==
- Winner of 135 prizes for running
- Winner of 1st Newton 1-mile (1.6 km) handicap run - 1896
- Winner of 7-Mile U.S. Cross-country Championship – 1897
- Second in the N. E. A. A. A. U. championship 3-mile (4.8 km) run – 1897
- Winner – Newton 1-mile (1.6 km) handicap race - 1898
- Winner – 3-mile (4.8 km) New England Championship - 1898
- World Record in 11-Mile Cross-country – 1898
- Winner B.A.A. 10-mile (16 km) Cross-country – 1898
- Winner 2nd Boston Marathon – 2:42 – 1898
- Canadian Record – 3-mile (4.8 km)
- Canadian Record – 5-mile (8.0 km)
- World Record – indoor 1-mile (1.6 km)
- Winner St. John's Marathon - 1909

== See also ==
- List of winners of the Boston Marathon
