= John McDermott (runner) =

American marathon runner

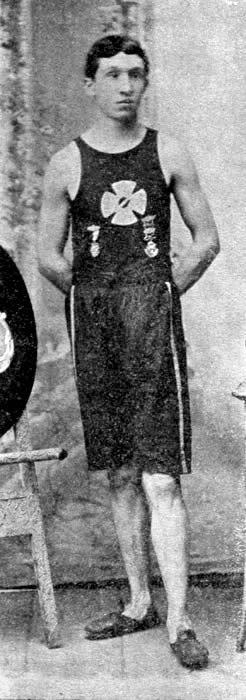
- McDermott circa 1898
- Born: October 16, 1874; Manhattan, New York, U.S.
- Died: Before 1906 (aged 31–32)
- Occupation: Lithographer
- Known for: Marathon running

John J. McDermott (October 16, 1874 – before 1906) was an Irish-American athlete. Nicknamed "J.J." or "little Mac", he won the first marathon run in the United States in 1896, as well as the inaugural Boston Marathon, then known as the B.A.A. Road Race, in 1897. He was a lithographer by trade.

== Biography ==
Little is known of McDermott's life outside of his running accomplishments. He was born in Manhattan, New York City, to James McDermott and Lizzie Grady. His mother died when he was 11 years old. McDermott was unusually frail and light as a youth. At the start of the first Boston Marathon, he weighed in at 124 pounds (56 kg) on a 5-foot-6-inch (168 cm) frame, slight even by marathoner standards. He reportedly died either from consumption (tuberculosis) or from an inherited pulmonary disease sometime before 1906. One source states that he had tuberculosis when he won the Boston Marathon in 1897. As of 2017, New England Historic Genealogical Society in Boston had an ongoing search to learn his burial location. His sister Julia died of tuberculosis in 1905.

=== First American marathon ===
The first marathon race to be held in the United States took place on September 19, 1896, five months after the first Olympic Marathon, as part of the fall meeting of the Knickerbocker Athletic Club of New York City. While regular track and field events were taking place at the Columbia Oval (located in an area that was then part of Williamsbridge but is now called Norwood, in the Bronx borough), 28 athletes, almost all from the New York City area, had earlier traveled by train to Stamford, Connecticut, for the marathon race. The course began at the Stamford Armory, and proceeded through Riverside, Cos Cob, Greenwich, Port Chester, Rye, Harrison, Mamaroneck, Larchmont, New Rochelle, East Chester, Woodlawn, and William's Bridge, finishing with two laps on the Columbia Oval. While the course was presented as 25 miles (40.2 km) long, a distance similar to that of the Olympic Marathon, statistician Hugh Farley has undertaken a best-guess reconstruction of the route which measures only 23.6 miles (38.0 km).

The roads for the first eight miles (13 km) were in terrible condition, covered in mud and slush from heavy precipitation that morning. McDermott, representing the Pastime Athletic Club of New York City, took the lead at New Rochelle, about seven miles (11 km) from the finish, and held that lead, completing the race in the time of 3:25:55.6, two and a half minutes ahead of the second-place athlete, cross-country runner Hamilton Gray. The winning time was 27 minutes slower than the Olympic Marathon time posted by Spiridon Louis five months previously, which was attributed to the difficult conditions under which the race was run. Nineteen athletes completed the race in total.

=== First Boston Marathon ===
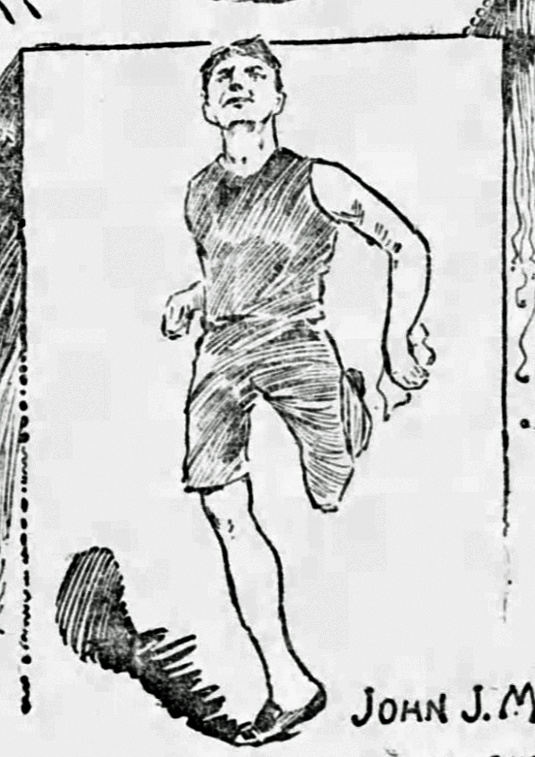
Illustration of McDermott winning the 1897 Boston Marathon

On April 19, 1897, McDermott ran the first Boston Marathon as one of 15 starters, six from New York. He lost 10 pounds (5 kg) over the course of the race.

The initial lead was taken by Hamilton Gray, second in the New York race, and Dick Grant, a Harvard track athlete from St. Mary's, Ontario, Canada. McDermott was running thirty yards (27 m) behind the leaders at South Framingham, about four miles (6 km) in, and 400 yards (370 m) behind by the eight-mile (13 km) mark at Natick. But he took the lead at the downhill into Newton Lower Falls, about twelve miles (19 km) in. Grant attempted to stay with him, but had to give up when the uphill out of Newton Lower Falls was reached. McDermott continued to extend his lead through the Newton Hills, beginning to combine walking and running at about the twenty-mile (32 km) mark at Evergreen Cemetery. After a rubdown from his handler, he proceeded down Beacon Street and Commonwealth Avenue. At Massachusetts Avenue, he ran into a funeral procession, stalling two electric cars. He finished with a lap of the Irvington Oval, part of a track and field meet conducted by the Boston Athletic Association.

McDermott's time was 2:55:10, three minutes and forty seconds faster than Spiridon Louis’ time at the Olympic Games, so it was immediately claimed as a world record. However, there was no standard marathon distance at the time, and no organization to ratify world records. Both the Olympic and Boston courses were claimed to be about 25 miles (40 km), shorter than the now standard marathon distance of 26 miles 385 yards (42.195 km), and neither mark is considered to have been a world record or world best by the International Association of Athletics Federations (IAAF), which is now responsible for ratifying world records in athletics.

McDermott had finished the marathon with bloody and blistered feet, his skin peeling off. He stated that this would likely be his last long race. But he returned the next year to defend his title. He was the race favorite. Hamilton Gray and Dick Grant were back as well. However, the race was won by Ronald McDonald, a 22-year-old from Antigonish, Nova Scotia, Canada, who was a student at Boston College, in a course record time of 2:42:00, over 13 minutes faster than McDermott's time from the previous year. McDermott also beat his previous time, finishing in 2:54:17, but finished only fourth.
