= Jack Caffery (runner) =

Canadian long-distance runner

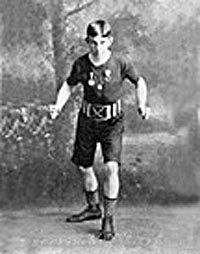
Jack Caffery.

John Peter Caffery (Note: Also known as Jack Caffrey, and sometimes as "J. J. Caffery". His last name was variously spelled "Caffrey" or "Caffery".) (May 21, 1879 – February 12, 1919) was a Canadian track and field athlete who competed in the marathon at the 1908 Summer Olympics where he finished in 11th place. Caffrey was also a two-time champion of the Boston Marathon. He won with a time of 2:39:44.4 in 1900 and with a time of 2:29:23.6 in 1901, both of which were course records for the then 25-mile course.

Caffrey was the son of Irish immigrants. He was a teamster by trade and represented St. Patrick's Athletic Association/St. Patrick's Athletic Club. He was born in Hamilton, Ontario and died there from complications after falling ill with Spanish flu.

== See also ==
- List of winners of the Boston Marathon
