= Perola (horse) =

British-bred Thoroughbred racehorse

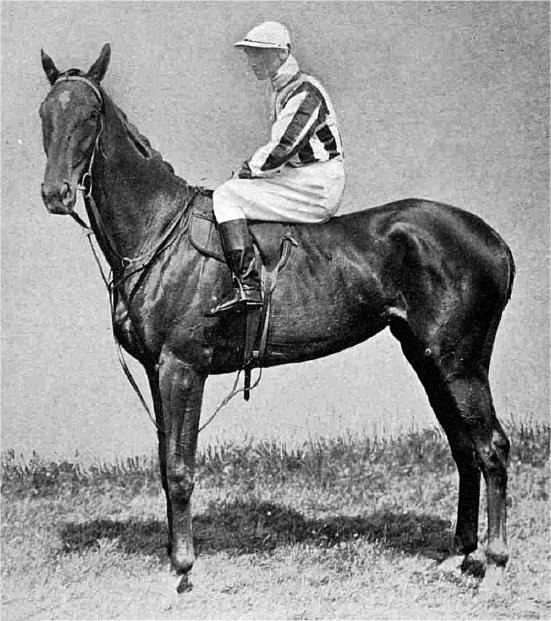
- Perola in 1908 with Maher.
- Sire: Persimmon
- Grandsire: St Simon
- Dam: Edmee
- Damsire: Juggler
- Sex: Mare
- Foaled: 1906
- Country: United Kingdom
- Colour: Chestnut
- Breeder: Daniel Cooper
- Owner: William Cooper
- Trainer: Saunders Davies
- Record: 10: 5-1-3
- Earnings: £8,213

Major wins
- Woodcote Stakes (1908); Oaks Stakes (1909)

Perola (1906 – after 1929) was a British Thoroughbred racehorse and broodmare. She was one of the best juvenile fillies in England in 1908 when she won four of her seven races, including the Woodcote Stakes, as well as being placed behind Bayardo in both the New Stakes and the Dewhurst Stakes. In the following year she finished third in the 1000 Guineas and then recorded her biggest win in the Oaks Stakes. In early 1910 she was sold and exported to France to become a broodmare.

== Background ==
Perola was a chestnut mare bred in England by the Australian baronet Sir Daniel Cooper and owned during her racing career by Cooper's younger brother William. She was trained by Saunders Davies-Scourfield at Myrtle Grove in Sussex.

She was sired by Persimmon, whose wins included the Derby, St Leger, Eclipse Stakes and Ascot Gold Cup and who went on to be British champion sire on four occasions. Perola's dam Edmee was a female-line descendant of the St Leger winner Caller Ou.

== Racing career ==
=== 1908: two-year-old season ===
Perola was ridden in most of her early races by the American jockey Danny Maher. She recorded her first success when she produced a "rare rush" of speed to win the Woodcote Stakes over five furlongs at Epsom Racecourse on Derby day 1908. Two weeks later at Royal Ascot she came home third behind the colts Bayardo and Perdiccas in the New Stakes. In the following month she took the Exeter Stakes at Newmarket from two "moderate" opponents and the Rous Memorial at Goodwood Racecourse, beating the Ludwig Neumann's filly Electra "with any amount in hand" in the latter race. She recorded a fourth success in August when she won the Hardwicke Stakes at Stockton Racecourse. In the Dewhurst Stakes over seven furlongs at Newmarket Racecourse on 30 October she finished second to Bayardo who by then had established himself as the year's leading juvenile colt. On her only other start of the year she started favourite for the Cheveley Park Stakes but finished unplaced behind the Sceptre filly (later named Maid of the Mist). Her earnings for the season totalled £3,253.

=== 1909: three-year-old season ===
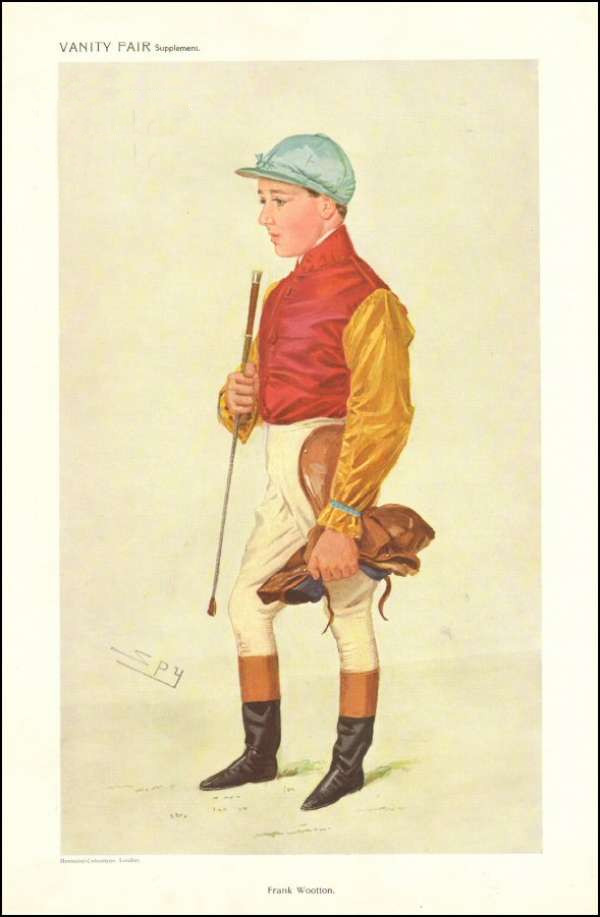
Frank Wootton, who rode Perola to victory in the Oaks

On 30 April 1909 Perola was one of ten fillies to contest the 1000 Guineas over the Rowley Mile course at Newmarket, despite being reported to be "somewhat amiss" before the race. Ridden by the Australian teenager Frank Wootton, she started the 3/1 second favourite and finished third behind Electra and King Edward VII's Princesse de Galles. Her temperament may have contributed to her defeat: she was described as being in a "fightable" mood on the way to the start and repeatedly veered off a straight course during the race.

Perola was then moved in distance for the 131st running of the Oaks Stakes over one and a half miles at Epsom on 28 May, with Wootton again in the saddle. The first three from the 1000 Guineas dominated the betting, with Electra starting the 5/4 favourite ahead of Perola (5/1) and Princesse de Galles (11/2). Electra lost her chance at the start as she whipped round and was facing in the wrong direction when the tapes went up. After taking the lead in the straight, Perola never looked in any danger of defeat in the last quarter mile and won "with a good deal in hand" by two lengths from Princesse de Galles with a further two lengths back to the outsider Verne in third place. Her winning time of 2:39.8 was 2.6 seconds faster than that recorded by Minoru in the Derby Stakes over the same course and distance two days previously.

At Hurst Park in August, Perola finished last of the three runners behind the colts Bayardo and Valens in the Duchess of York Plate.

Perola earned a total of £4,960 in 1909.

== Assessment and honours ==
In their book, A Century of Champions, based on the Timeform rating system, John Randall and Tony Morris rated Perola an "inferior" winner of the Oaks.

== Breeding record ==
In early 1910 Perola was sold privately to a French breeder. William Cooper explained that he did not have the space to create a breeding facility on his own property and did not want to put his mares to stud at a location where he could not see them regularly. The buyer was Edouard de Rothschild, who moved the mare to his Meautry stud near Deauville in Normandy. She produced at least five foals between 1912 and 1923:

- Le Paraclet, bay colt, foaled in 1912, sired by Sans Souci
- Plantagenet, chestnut colt, 1913, by Sans Souci
- Pindare, bay colt, 1914, by Sans Souci
- Passebreul, chestnut colt, 1915, by Predicateur. Won Prix Gladiateur, Grand Prix de Chantilly, La Coupe.
- Penthesilee, chestnut filly, 13 April 1923, by La Farina

== Pedigree ==
Pedigree of Perola (GB), chestnut mare, 1906
Sire Persimmon (GB) 1893	St. Simon (GB); 1881	Galopin	Vedette
Sire Persimmon (GB) 1893	St. Simon (GB); 1881	Galopin	Flying Duchess
Sire Persimmon (GB) 1893	St. Simon (GB); 1881	St. Angela	King Tom
Sire Persimmon (GB) 1893	St. Simon (GB); 1881	St. Angela	Adeline
Sire Persimmon (GB) 1893	Perdita II (GB); 1881	Hampton	Lord Clifden
Sire Persimmon (GB) 1893	Perdita II (GB); 1881	Hampton	Lady Langden
Sire Persimmon (GB) 1893	Perdita II (GB); 1881	Hermione	Young Melbourne
Sire Persimmon (GB) 1893	Perdita II (GB); 1881	Hermione	La Belle Helene
Dam Edmee (GB) 1896	Juggler (GB); 1885	Touchet	Lord Lyon
Dam Edmee (GB) 1896	Juggler (GB); 1885	Touchet	Lady Audley
Dam Edmee (GB) 1896	Juggler (GB); 1885	Enchantress	Scottish Chief
Dam Edmee (GB) 1896	Juggler (GB); 1885	Enchantress	Lady Love
Dam Edmee (GB) 1896	Pink Pearl (GB); 1887	Beau Brummel	George Frederick
Dam Edmee (GB) 1896	Pink Pearl (GB); 1887	Beau Brummel	Ma Belle
Dam Edmee (GB) 1896	Pink Pearl (GB); 1887	Irish Pearl	Master Kildare
Dam Edmee (GB) 1896	Pink Pearl (GB); 1887	Irish Pearl	Three Pearls (Family: 10-a)
