= Newminster (horse) =

British-bred Thoroughbred racehorse

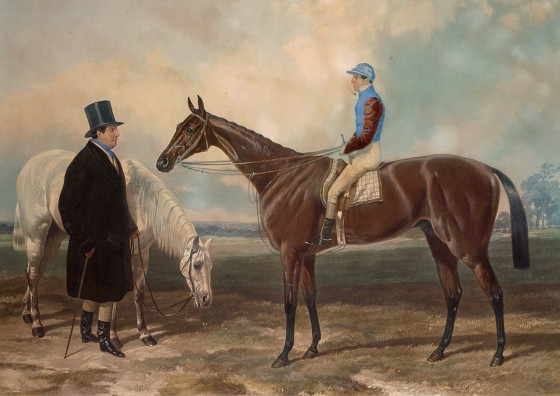
- Engraving of Newminster
- Sire: Touchstone
- Grandsire: Camel
- Dam: Beeswing
- Damsire: Doctor Syntax
- Sex: Stallion
- Foaled: 1848
- Country: Great Britain
- Colour: Bay
- Breeder: William Orde
- Owner: Anthony Nichol; Richard Lumley-Saville
- Trainer: John Scott
- Record: 10: 2-0-1

Major wins
- St. Leger Stakes (1851); Sweepstakes of £300 (1852)

Awards
- Leading sire in Great Britain and Ireland (1859, 1863)

Newminster (1848 – 2 October 1868) was a British Thoroughbred racehorse who won the St. Leger Stakes in 1851. He raced for four seasons, winning two of his ten races. He retired to stud in Yorkshire and became British champion sire in 1859 and 1863. Newminster sired the Derby winners Musjid and Hermit and the champion sires Adventurer and Lord Clifden. He was trained by John Scott and owned by Anthony Nichol throughout his racing career.

== Background ==
Newminster was a bay colt bred by William Orde and foaled in 1848. He was sired by Touchstone, who won the St. Leger Stakes as a three-year-old, before winning both the Doncaster Cup and Ascot Gold Cup twice as an older horse. He was also a successful stallion, becoming British champion sire four times. Touchstone sired many Classic winners including the Derby winners Cotherstone, Orlando and Surplice. Newminster's dam was Beeswing, a daughter of Doctor Syntax. Beeswing was a successful racemare who raced for many years. Her wins included six Newcastle Gold Cups, four Doncaster Cups and one Ascot Gold Cup. Beeswing also foaled the 2000 Guineas winner Nunnykirk, who was also sired by Touchstone. Newminster was purchased as a yearling by Anthony Nichol and put into training with John Scott.

== Racing career ==
=== 1851: Three-year-old season ===
A week before Newminster was scheduled to run in the Derby, there were reports that he had gone amiss. However, on 21 May 1851, along with 32 other horses, Newminster lined up at Epsom Downs for the start of the Derby Stakes. Teddington was the 3/1 favourite for the race and Marlborough Buck was next in the betting at 7/2, with Newminster being a big outsider at the odds of 1000/15. Newminster never challenged the leaders and did not finish in the top eight. Teddington won the race by two lengths from Marlborough Buck, with Neasham a further length back in third place.

Newminster's next race was the two-mile Ebor St. Leger at York in August. He started as the odds-on favourite, but could only finish third in the five-runner field. The Calculator won the race by a length from Cnaeus. The following month Newminster went to Doncaster for the St. Leger Stakes. Hernandez started at the price of 6/4 and was the pre-race favourite. Aphrodite was priced at 7/2, The Ban at 5/1, Ephesus at 12/1 and Newminster at 15/1, with the other thirteen runners 20/1 or bigger. The field got away to an even start, with Deceitful setting the pace at the front. Jockey Sim Templeman settled Newminster in the middle of the pack, where he stayed for the majority of the race. As the field turned into the finishing straight, Deceitful faded and Aphrodite took over the lead. Newminster closed up until he was challenging for the lead as they entered the final furlong. He then pulled away near the finish to win by two lengths from Aphrodite. Hookem Snivvy was a further two lengths back in third place, with the favourite eventually finishing in ninth. His win in the St. Leger meant he had to carry a twelve-pound weight penalty in the Cambridgeshire Stakes. Despite this he stated as second favourite, but was never able to challenge and finished well down the field, behind winner Truth.

=== 1852: Four-year-old season ===
Newminster did not reappear as a four-year-old until Goodwood in late July, where he ran in a sweepstakes of £300 each over the distance of about three miles and five furlongs. He started as the 1/3 favourite and was ridden by Sim Templeman. At the start of the race Phlegethon went into the lead and pulled clear, at one point being about one furlong clear to the other three runners. With three quarters of a mile left to run Newminster and Harpsichord began to close down the lead. Newminster overtook him as they entered the final furlong and won by two lengths from Harpsichord, with Phlegethon in third place. Two days later he started in the Goodwood Cup, but did not finish in the top five. The race was won by Kingston, with Little Harry second and Teddington third. In September he finished fourth, behind winner Teddington, in the two and a half mile Doncaster Cup.

=== 1853: Five-year-old season ===
Newminster's first start as a five-year-old was in the Tradesmen's Plate at Chester. He started the race at 15/1, but finished outside the first four, behind winner Goldfinder. His only other start of the season was in August in the Great Ebor Handicap at York. Pantomime won the race by a neck from The Nabob, with Newminster finishing outside the top eight.

=== 1854: Six-year-old season ===
Newminster only started once in 1854, in the Tradesmen's Plate at Chester. He started the race at 11/1 and was near the front before breaking down with a few furlongs left to run. The race was won by Epaminondas. Newminster was put out of training and sold to Richard Lumley-Saville for 1,300 guineas to stand at stud.

== Assessment ==
Despite winning only two races, Newminster was highly regarded, with people believing he was unable to show his true potential.

== Stud career ==
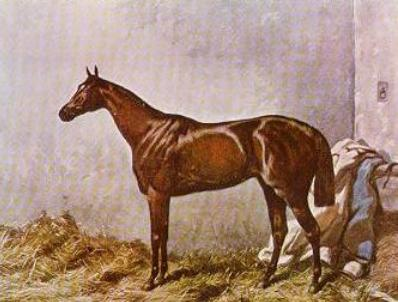
Newminster's son Hermit

Newminster retired to stud at Tickhill Castle near Doncaster, where he stood for two seasons at the fee of 10 guineas. He then moved to Rawcliffe Stud near York, where his fee rose to 15 guineas. After his son Musjid won the Derby in 1859 his fee rose to 50 guineas and later 100 guineas. Newminster was a successful stallion and was the British champion sire in 1859 and 1863. His most notable progeny were:

- Musjid (1856) – won the Derby in 1859. He sired several good winners, but died relatively young in 1865.
- Nemesis (1858) – won the 1000 Guineas.
- Adventurer (1859) – won the City and Suburban Handicap and Ascot Gold Vase as a four-year-old. He then became a champion sire, producing 2000 Guineas and Derby winner Pretender and the multiple Classic-winning fillies Apology and Wheel of Fortune.
- Lord Clifden (1860) – won the St. Leger in 1863 and later become a champion sire. He sired the St. Leger winners Hawthornden, Wenlock, Petrarch (also won 2000 Guineas) and Jannette (also won the Oaks).
- Cambuscan (1861) – won the July Stakes and sired the undefeated Kincsem.
- Hermit (1864) – won the Derby, the Biennial at Ascot and St. James's Palace Stakes. After retiring from racing he became a successful stallion and was champion sire seven times. His best daughter was Shotover, who won the 2000 Guineas and Derby. He also sired the fillies St Marguerite, Lonely and Thebais.

Newminster died on 2 October 1868 at Rawliffe.

== Sire line tree ==
Descendants of Newminster (click to show)
- Newminster
  - Daniel
  - Musjid
    - Leybourne
    - Wroughton
    - Islam
    - Vagabond
  - Newcastle
    - Charnwood
    - Sir Hugo
  - Joey Jones
  - Kildonan
  - Oldminster
  - Stanton
  - Adventurer
    - Argyle
      - Carsethorn
    - Border Knight
    - Pretender
    - Enterprise
    - Dunois
    - Speculation
      - Cork
    - Chivalrous
    - Pirate
    - Blantyre
    - Schwindler
    - Glen Arthur
    - Militant
    - Ruperra
      - Rajita Rajita
      - Achilles
        - Kranach
    - Sir Amyas Leigh
    - Bonnie Doon
    - Sportsman
    - Ishmael
    - Privateer
      - Buccaneer
    - Borneo
  - Yorkminster
  - Meuzzin
  - Onesander
  - Pratique
  - Cambuscan
    - Botheration
    - Onslow
    - Cambuslang
      - Baron Farney
      - Come Away
    - Billesdon
      - Caesar
    - Camballo
      - Peppermint
      - The Lambkin
      - Eurasian
      - Campanula
      - Claymore
      - Hospodar
      - Nunthorpe
      - Ralph Neville
    - Cavaliero
    - Isolani
    - Frangepan
    - Cambus
    - Paszlor
  - Cathedral
    - Dalham
    - Organist
    - Clocher
    - El Plata
  - Midnight Mass
  - The Beadle
  - Bedminster
  - Heir-At-Law
  - Hurrah
    - Hermit
  - Laseretto
  - Victorious
    - Rosebach
  - Crown Prince
  - Laneret
  - Strathconan
    - Midlothian
    - Bishop Burton
    - Strathern
    - Buchanan
  - Vespasian
    - Bersaglier
    - Eastern Emperor
    - Blairgowrie
    - Touchstone
    - Greywing
    - Grey Gown
  - Hermit
    - Ascetic
      - St Andrew
      - Anchorite
      - Cenobite
      - Roman Oak
      - Royal Meath
        - Tipperary Boy
        - Midas
        - Rory O'Moore
        - Royal Bow
      - Cloister
      - Ulysses
      - Abbot
      - Aconite
      - Hermit
      - Koodoo
      - Sir Patrick
        - Patlander
      - Riverstown
        - Lord Rivers
      - Athletic
      - Drumcree
      - Hidden Mystery
      - Leinster
      - Uncle Jack
      - Orange Pat
      - Ascetic's Silver
    - Trappist
    - Ambergris
    - Gunnersbury
      - Uram Batyam
      - Galifard
    - Peter
      - Sweetheart
        - Sweet Cecil
      - Zsupan
      - Peterhof
        - Repeater
    - Retreat
      - Father O'Flynn
      - Skedaddle
    - St Louis
      - St Germaine
      - Le Hardy
        - Retz
    - Tristan
      - Le Nord
      - Le Nicham
    - Whipper-In
      - Malakoff
      - Revancha
    - Cassock
    - St Blaise
      - St Carlo
      - Potomac
      - Silver Fox
        - Sly Fox
      - St Florian
      - Margrave
        - Margraviate
      - St Bartholomew
    - Candlemas
      - Irish Lad
        - Blarney
    - Gamin
      - Gospodar
    - Gay Hermit
      - Talma
      - Balcarce
      - Gonin
      - Valero
        - Mister Irving
      - Cordon Rouge
      - Celso
    - St Mirin
    - Timothy
    - Friar's Balsam
      - Balsamo
      - Voter
        - Ballot
        - Electioneer
        - Hilarious
        - Runnymede
        - The Manager
    - Hazelhatch
    - Melanion
      - Toscin
      - Esquileno
      - Guido Reni
    - Heaume
      - Le Roi Soleil
        - Sans Souci
    - Orbend
      - Karibo
  - Kidderminster
  - Bogue Homa
  - Cardinal York
    - Havok
  - Conjuror
    - Juggler
  - Lord Clifden
    - His Lordship
    - Falkenberg
    - Hawthornden
      - Sunset
    - Moorlands
    - Barefoot
      - Old Joe
    - Buckden
      - Alec Ament
      - Bend Or
      - Jim Guest
      - Babcock
      - Harry Gilmore
      - Mediator
      - Monogram
      - Ascender
      - Buchanan
        - Buck McCann
    - Hymenaeus
      - Blue Monkey
      - Battenberg
    - Wenlock
      - Limestone
      - Quicklime
      - Deceiver
        - Pureyear D
      - Cyrus
      - Panzerschiff
      - Abingdon
      - Martenhurst
    - Winslow
      - Roquefort
    - Hampton
      - Ladislas
      - Duke Of Richmond
      - Royal Hampton
        - Marcion
        - Styrax
        - Kirkconnel
        - Royal Emblem
        - Forfarshire
        - Royal Lancer
      - Eothen
        - Ethelbert
      - Grandison
      - Merry Hampton
        - Pride
      - Apollo
      - Ayrshire
        - Ayr Laddie
        - Symington
        - Kilkerrin
        - Heir Male
        - Bowling Brook
        - Solitaire
        - Cossack
        - Doctrine
        - Robert Le Diable
        - Airlie
        - Airship
        - Festino
        - Traquair
      - Sheen
        - Batt
      - Gay Hampton
      - Lord Lorne
      - Fitz Hampton
      - Balmoral
      - Bushey Park
      - Phocion
      - Cheery Tree
      - Ladas
        - Epsom Lad
        - Gorgos
        - Troutbeck
      - Speed
        - Velocity
      - Walmsgate
        - Jerry M
      - Star Ruby
        - Sombrero
        - Rubio
        - Africander
        - Cairngorm
      - Troon
      - Bay Ronald
        - Wild Oats
        - MacDonald
        - Dark Ronald
        - Bayardo
        - Fidia
        - Combourg
    - Bay Windham
    - Petrarch
      - The Bard
        - Berenger
        - The Minstrel
        - Madcap
        - St Michel
        - Gouvernail
        - Launay
        - Indian Chief
        - Longbow
        - Vidame
        - Maigstral
        - Thibet
        - Monsieur Amedee
        - Royal
        - Neflier
        - Saxon
        - Tibere
        - Monsieur Charvet
        - Tarquin
      - Laureate
        - Northern Farmer
      - Hackler
        - Uphantes
        - Covert Hack
        - The Hake
        - Prince Of Naples
        - Flying Hackle
        - Green Hackle
        - Organdale
        - St Brendan
        - Flaxman
        - Hack Watch
        - Royal Hackle
        - Hackenshmidt
        - Jenkinstown
        - Old Fairyhouse
        - Ballyhackle
        - Cackler
        - Covertcoat
        - Uncle George
      - Lactantius
        - Allegro
        - Gay Lothair
      - Peter Flower
      - The Lombard
      - Florist
        - Zarda
    - Kinsman
    - Cyprus
    - El Rey
    - King of Trumps
      - The Rejected
    - Lord Clive
      - Calabrais
      - La Moriniere
    - Reefer

== Pedigree ==
Pedigree of Newminster, bay stallion, 1848
Sire Touchstone (GB) br. 1831	Camel (GB) br. 1822	Whalebone br. 1807	Waxy
Sire Touchstone (GB) br. 1831	Camel (GB) br. 1822	Whalebone br. 1807	Penelope*
Sire Touchstone (GB) br. 1831	Camel (GB) br. 1822	Selim mare br. 1812	Selim
Sire Touchstone (GB) br. 1831	Camel (GB) br. 1822	Selim mare br. 1812	Maiden
Sire Touchstone (GB) br. 1831	Banter (GB) br. 1826	Master Henry b. 1815	Orville*
Sire Touchstone (GB) br. 1831	Banter (GB) br. 1826	Master Henry b. 1815	Miss Sophia
Sire Touchstone (GB) br. 1831	Banter (GB) br. 1826	Boadicea b. 1807	Alexander
Sire Touchstone (GB) br. 1831	Banter (GB) br. 1826	Boadicea b. 1807	Brunette
Dam Beeswing (GB) b. 1833	Doctor Syntax (GB) br. 1811	Paynator br. 1791	Trumpator*
Dam Beeswing (GB) b. 1833	Doctor Syntax (GB) br. 1811	Paynator br. 1791	Mark Anthony mare
Dam Beeswing (GB) b. 1833	Doctor Syntax (GB) br. 1811	Beningbrough mare	Beningborough*
Dam Beeswing (GB) b. 1833	Doctor Syntax (GB) br. 1811	Beningbrough mare	Jenny Mole
Dam Beeswing (GB) b. 1833	Ardrossan mare (GB) ch. 1817	Ardrossan b. 1809	John Bull
Dam Beeswing (GB) b. 1833	Ardrossan mare (GB) ch. 1817	Ardrossan b. 1809	Miss Whip
Dam Beeswing (GB) b. 1833	Ardrossan mare (GB) ch. 1817	Lady Eliza b. 1813	Whitworth
Dam Beeswing (GB) b. 1833	Ardrossan mare (GB) ch. 1817	Lady Eliza b. 1813	Spadille mare

Note: b. = Bay, br. = Brown, ch. = Chestnut

* Newminster is inbred 5S x 4D to the stallion Trumpator, meaning that he appears fifth generation (via Penelope) on the sire side of his pedigree, and fourth generation on the dam side of his pedigree.

* Newminster is inbred 5S x 4D to the stallion Beningbrough, meaning that he appears fifth generation (via Orville) on the sire side of his pedigree, and fourth generation on the dam side of his pedigree.
