= Lord Clifden =

British-bred Thoroughbred racehorse

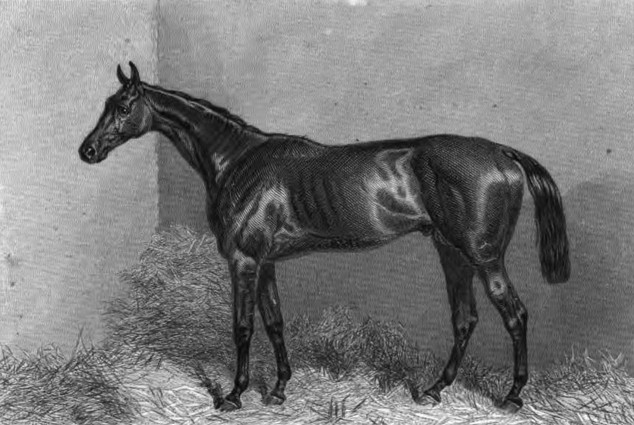
- Painting of Lord Clifden
- Sire: Newminster
- Grandsire: Touchstone
- Dam: The Slave
- Damsire: Melbourne
- Sex: Stallion
- Foaled: 1860
- Country: Great Britain
- Colour: Bay
- Breeder: J. A. Hind
- Owner: J. A. Hind; 3rd Viscount St Vincent; Thomas Gee
- Trainer: Edwin Parr
- Record: 12: 7–2–0

Major wins
- Woodcote Stakes (1862); Champagne Stakes (1862); St. Leger Stakes (1863); Doncaster Stakes (1863)

Awards
- Champion sire in Germany (1872); Champion sire in Great Britain and Ireland (1876)

Lord Clifden (1860 – 7 February 1875) was a British Thoroughbred racehorse. He was undefeated as a two-year-old, including wins in the Woodcote Stakes and Champagne Stakes. As a three-year-old, he was just beaten by a short-head in the Derby, before winning the St. Leger later in the season, despite being 100 yards behind the rest of the field at one point in the race. After an unsuccessful four-year-old campaign, he was retired to stud and became champion sire of Great Britain and Ireland in 1876. He sired the St. Leger winners Hawthornden and Wenlock, the dual-Classic winners Petrarch and Jannette, as well as the champion sire Hampton. Lord Clifden was purchased by Carnegie Robert John Jervis, 3rd Viscount St Vincent, after his first race and was sold to Thomas Gee as a stallion. As the two and three-year-old, he was trained by Edwin Parr, with William Bevill training him for his four-year-old season.

== Background ==
Lord Clifden was a bay colt bred by J. A. Hind and foaled in 1860. He was sired by Newminster, who had won the St. Leger in 1851. Newminster later became a successful stallion and was twice champion sire of Great Britain and Ireland. Among his other progeny was Hermit, who won the Derby and was champion sire seven times. Newminster also sired the Derby winner Musjid, the 1000 Guineas winner Nemesis, and Adventurer who also became a champion sire. Lord Clifden's dam was The Slave, a daughter of Melbourne. Hind had purchased The Slave as a yearling in 1853. She raced as a two-year-old, placing once, before being retired to stud. Two years before the birth of Lord Clifden, she foaled Lady Clifden, a filly by Surplice. Lady Clifden went on to win the Portland Handicap and Stewards' Cup. Hind placed Lord Clifden in training with Edwin Parr.

== Racing career ==
=== 1862: Two-year-old season ===
Lord Clifden's first race was on 4 June 1862 in the Woodcote Stakes over three-quarters of a mile at Epsom Downs. He was ridden by George Fordham and started as the 6/4 favourite. Despite getting a bad start, he took the lead as the field entered straight and won easily by a length and a half from The Orphan. After the Woodcote Stakes, Lord Clifden was purchased by Captain Christie for £4,000 and then a few weeks later by Carnegie Robert John Jervis, 3rd Viscount St Vincent, for 5,000 guineas.

He didn't run again until September, when he contested the Champagne Stakes at Doncaster and started as the odds-on favourite. Fordham held him up at the rear of the field, but had to start riding him before they had turned into the finishing straight. As the six-runner field entered the final furlong, Lord Clifden had almost caught leaders Armagnac and Early Purl. He then overtook them inside the last furlong and won by half a length from Armagnac, with Early Purl a further three lengths back in third place. Two days later, Lord Clifden raced in a sweepstakes of £10 each with £100 added. He got off to a bad start, losing several lengths to the rest of the field as Volturno went into the lead. Lord Clifden closed up on the field as they turned into the straight. At the one-furlong pole, Fordham asked him for an effort and stride by stride he caught Bohemia, who was then leading, and just overtook him at the line to win by a head. Queen Bertha finished third, three lengths behind the front two.

=== 1863: Three-year-old season ===
==== Epsom Downs ====
On 20 May 1863, Lord Clifden faced 30 rivals in the Derby Stakes at Epsom Downs. Ridden again by George Fordham, he started the race as the 4/1 favourite. Also near the front of the betting were Hospender and Gellie at 9/1 and Macaroni and Saccharometer at 10/1. There was a delay to the start by almost one hour after the horses were fifteen minutes late going to post and then there were over thirty false starts. When they finally got under way, Lord Clifden was positioned in about tenth place by Fordham, as Bright Cloud led the field. With one mile still to run, Bright Cloud faded and left Donnybrook and Lord Clifden in the lead. The Cloud was in third place until the six-furlong pole, where he swerved and brought down Saccharometer. The incident also caused King of the Vale to unseat his rider and almost brought down Fantastic. As the horses rounded Tattenham Corner, Lord Clifden had a slight lead over Donnybrook, with Tom Fool lying in third. As they entered the finishing straight, Donnybrook and Lord Clifden's nearest challengers were Tom Fool and Macaroni. Inside the final furlong, Macaroni closed down the leader and with Lord Clifden stumbling in the last stride, got the better and won by a short-head. Rapid Rhone finished in third place, half a length behind Macaroni and Lord Clifden. After the race, many people thought that the race was either a dead heat or that Lord Clifden had won. The following day, Lord Clifden turned out for the Great Surrey Foal Stakes, where his only rival was the French horse Jarnicoton. Lord Clifden led until the final furlong, where he was challenged. The pair raced side by side, but Jarnicoton's stirrup broke and Lord Clifden won by a head.

==== Grand Prix de Paris ====
About two weeks after the Epsom, Lord Clifden travelled to France for the Grand Prix de Paris at Longchamp, which was run over 3,000 metres and worth 100,000 francs. It was a cloudy day in Paris and there was a large crowd, including the Emperor and Empress, King Fernando of Portugal and the Prince of Orange. La Toucques, who had won the Oaks and Derby at Chantilly, was the 2/1 favourite, with Lord Clifden starting as the second favourite at 7/2. Unlike in the Derby, the horses got away to a good start on the first attempt. Lord Clifden was settled at the rear of the field by jockey Tom Chaloner. Both La Toucques and Lord Clifden made progress through the pack together and when the field turned into the finishing straight, the pair were vying for the lead along with The Ranger and Saccharometer. However, Lord Clifden was the first one to fade and the finish was fought out between La Toucques and The Ranger. The Ranger won the race by one length from La Toucques, who was two lengths in front of Saccharometer. Lord Clifden finished in fifth place, seven lengths behind the winner.

==== St. Leger meeting ====
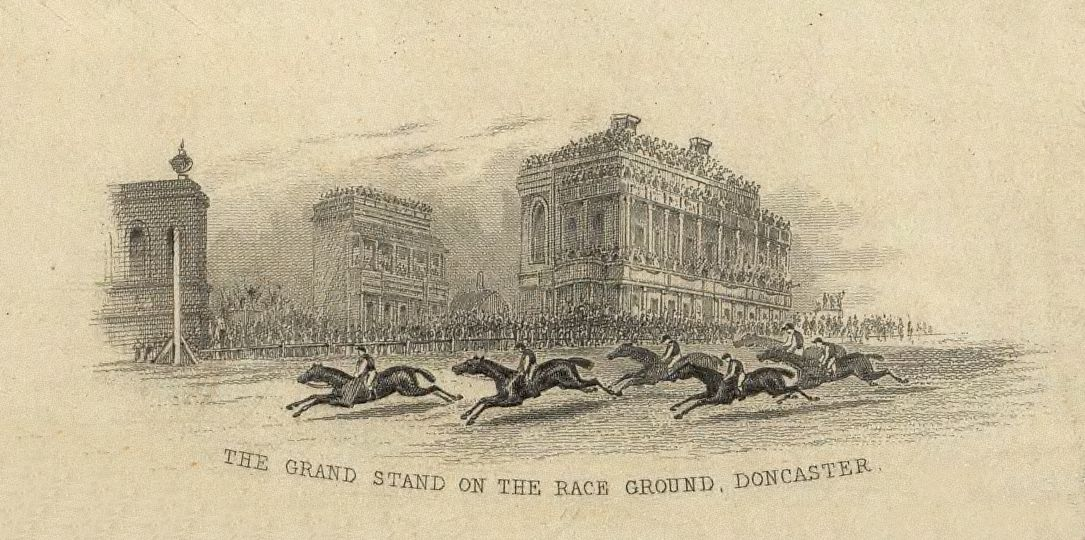
Doncaster racecourse, the scene of Lord Clifden's St. Leger victory

In the St. Leger Stakes, John Osborne took the ride on Lord Clifden, after regular jockey George Fordham expressed satisfaction over the colt getting beat in the Grand Prix de Paris (Viscount St Vincent did not ask him to ride in the Longchamp race). Lord Clifden was the pre-race favourite at 100/30. The field got away on the ninth attempt, with Dr. Syntax leading the field. Lord Clifden had another poor start and lost a lot of ground. However, after they had gone a short distance, Lord Clifden was even further behind, being 100 yards behind the rest of the field. It was said any price could be had on him winning with the price of 1200/1 being laid. Inside the last mile, Lord Clifden began to close rapidly on the other horses, who were still being led by Dr. Syntax. As they turned into the home straight, he was with the pack, and at the one-furlong pole, he and Queen Bertha look the lead. Lord Clifden got the better of the filly and won by half a length. Borealis finished in third, three lengths behind Queen Bertha, with Golden Pledge finishing fourth. Lord St Vincent, who reportedly won £20,000 in bets on the race, proclaimed that Lord Clifden was "the best horse in the world." The cheering of the crowd was said to be "deafening" as his number was raised as the winner. One reporter wrote after the race: "The opinion universally expressed was, that the race for the St. Leger was unsurpassed by any spectacle of the kind. For half a century to come the story of that contest will be told." Two days later, he faced four rivals in the Doncaster Stakes over one and a half miles. Lord Clifden again raced at the rear of the field until he made his challenge in the straight and winning easily by half a length from Borealis (who was carrying 14 pounds less weight). With winnings of £5805, Lord Clifden was second to Macaroni in the leading earners of 1863. This helped his sire, Newminster, become champion sire.

=== 1864: Four-year-old season ===
Lord Clifden started the 1864 season in the Claret Stakes in April, where he only faced two rivals. As Parr led him onto the course, a large crowd surrounded him. They got so close that they had to be ordered to get back by course officials. After the start, Rapid Rhone had a clear lead. Lord Clifden never got on terms and faded in the straight to finish second, ten lengths behind Rapid Rhone. On 9 June at Royal Ascot, he run in the Gold Cup in front of one of the largest crowds ever seen at Ascot. However, he spent the whole of the race at the rear of the field and could not challenge the leaders. In the end he finished unplaced, over 20 lengths behind winner Scottish Chief. Little Stag was second and Lord Zetland third. In late July, Lord Clifden was allotted top weight of 8 st 12 lb for the Chesterfield Cup run over one and a quarter miles at Goodwood. With half of a mile left to run, Lord Clifden was struck into by his half-sister Lady Clifden. This caused him to blunder and fall on his head, throwing John Osbourne to the ground, although the jockey did not sustain any serious injuries. The race was won by King of Utopia. Later the same day, Lord Clifden walked over for a sweepstakes of £100 each. He was then retired to stud. For part of his four-year-old season, Lord Clifden was trained by William Bevill.

== Stud career ==
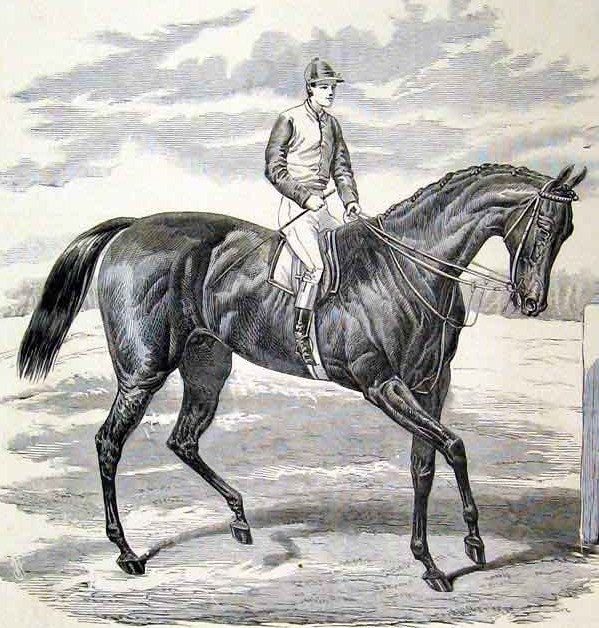
Lord Clifden's son Petrarch

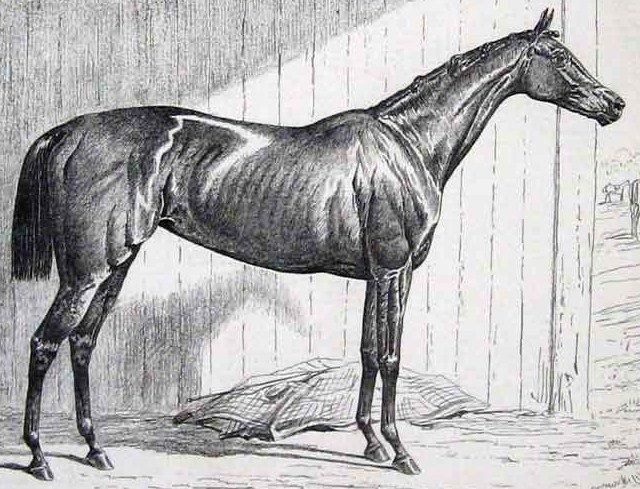
Lord Clifden's daughter Jannette

Lord Clifden was retired to Moorlands Stud in Skelton near York. In the summer of 1865, he was one of the horses who paraded at the Great Metropolitan Horse Show at the Agricultural Hall in Islington. Lord Clifden finished sixth in the list of leading sires in 1870, when Hawthornden won the St. Leger, and at the end of the year, Thomas Gee purchased him for 4,000 guineas, to stand at his Dewhurst Lodge Stud in Wadhurst, Sussex. In 1872, Lord Clifden was the leading sire in Germany. Lord Clifden became champion sire of Great Britain and Ireland in 1876, the year after his death. His most notable progeny were:

- Hawthornden (1867) – won the St. Leger, beating Derby winner Kingcraft.
- Buckden (1869) – was the sire of Kentucky Derby winner Buchanan and Kentucky Oaks winner Lucy May.
- Celibacy (1869) – was the dam of 2000 Guineas winner Scot Free.
- Hymenaeus (1869) – won the Deutsches Derby.
- Wenlock (1869) – finished fourth in the Derby before winning the St. Leger later in the 1872 season. He sired several good horses including top juvenile Panzerschiff and Sussex Stakes winner Limestone and his Prince of Wales's Stakes winning brother Quicklime. However, he was better known as a broodmare sire, producing the dams of Isinglass and Sainfoin.
- Winslow (1869) – won the Royal Hunt Cup.
- Hampton (1872) – as a five-year-old won the Northumberland Plate, Goodwood Cup and Doncaster Cup, before winning the Epsom Gold Cup the following year. After retiring from racing he became a successful stallion and was champion sire 1887. His progeny included the Classic winners Merry Hampton, Reve d'Or, Ayrshire and Ladas as well as Perdita and Bay Ronald who were influential at stud.
- Bay Windham (1873) – won the Woodcote Stakes at Epsom.
- Petrarch (1873) – won eight races including the Middle Park Plate, 2000 Guineas, Prince of Wales's Stakes, St. Leger, Ascot Gold Cup and Rous Memorial Stakes. At stud he got the fillies Busybody, Miss Jummy and Throstle along with the top juvenile colt The Bard.
- Manoeuvre (1874) – finished third in the St. Leger and foaled the Derby winner Sir Hugo and the steeplechaser Flying Column.
- Cyprus (1875) – won Ascot's Trial Stakes.
- El Rey (1875) – won the Grand Prix de Deauville in 1879.
- Jannette (1875) – was a leading juvenile and won The Oaks, Champion Stakes, Newmarket Oaks and St. Leger as a three-year-old. Her son Janissary won the St. James's Palace Stakes.
- Lord Clive (1875) – sired Prix du Jockey Club winner La Moriniere and top jumps horse Calabris.
- Reefer (1875) – won the Chester Cup.

Lord Clifden died on 7 February 1875 at Dewhurst Stud from "disease of the heart". He was aged 15 and left nine crops of foals. It is through Hampton's son Bay Ronald that his sire line survives.

== Sire line tree ==
Descendants of Lord Clifden (click to show)
- Lord Clifden
  - His Lordship
  - Falkenberg
  - Hawthornden
    - Sunset
  - Moorlands
  - Barefoot
    - Old Joe
  - Buckden
    - Alec Ament
    - Bend Or
    - Jim Guest
    - Babcock
    - Harry Gilmore
    - Mediator
    - Monogram
    - Ascender
    - Buchanan
      - Buck McCann
  - Hymenaeus
    - Blue Monkey
    - Battenberg
  - Wenlock
    - Limestone
    - Quicklime
    - Deceiver
      - Pureyear D
    - Cyrus
    - Panzerschiff
    - Abingdon
    - Martenhurst
  - Winslow
    - Roquefort
  - Hampton
    - Ladislas
    - Duke Of Richmond
    - Royal Hampton
      - Marcion
      - Styrax
      - Kirkconnel
        - Baron Kiki
      - Royal Emblem
        - Sacandaga
      - Forfarshire
        - Copper Ore
      - Royal Lancer
    - Eothen
      - Ethelbert
        - Colonel Holloway
    - Grandison
    - Merry Hampton
      - Pride
    - Apollo
    - Ayrshire
      - Ayr Laddie
      - Symington
        - Junior
      - Kilkerrin
        - Expectation
      - Heir Male
      - Bowling Brook
      - Solitaire
      - Cossack
      - Doctrine
      - Robert Le Diable
        - Wrack
      - Airlie
        - Martial
      - Airship
      - Festino
        - Festtarok
        - Orelio
        - Antinous
        - Amorino
        - Pergolese
      - Traquair
        - Woorak
    - Sheen
      - Batt
    - Gay Hampton
    - Lord Lorne
    - Fitz Hampton
    - Balmoral
    - Bushey Park
    - Phocion
    - Cheery Tree
    - Ladas
      - Epsom Lad
      - Gorgos
        - Gorgorito
        - Listman
        - Bridaine
        - Sourbier
      - Troutbeck
    - Speed
      - Velocity
    - Walmsgate
      - Jerry M
    - Star Ruby
      - Sombrero
      - Rubio
      - Africander
        - Dreadnought
      - Cairngorm
    - Troon
    - Bay Ronald
      - Wild Oats
      - MacDonald
        - As d'Atout
        - Oreg Lak
        - McKinley
      - Dark Ronald
        - Ambassador
        - Son-in-Law
        - Brown Prince
        - Dark Legend
        - Magpie
        - Prunus
        - Herold
        - Wallenstein
        - Axenstein
        - Traumer
        - Aditi
      - Bayardo
        - Gay Crusader
        - Gainsborough
        - Lord Basil
        - Manilardo
        - Allenby
        - Manton
        - The Ace
      - Fidia
      - Combourg
  - Bay Windham
  - Petrarch
    - The Bard
      - Berenger
      - The Minstrel
      - Madcap
        - Lieutel
        - Dor
      - St Michel
      - Gouvernail
      - Launay
        - Rab Joie
      - Indian Chief
      - Longbow
      - Vidame
      - Maigstral
      - Thibet
        - Titus
      - Monsieur Amedee
      - Royal
      - Neflier
      - Saxon
      - Tibere
      - Monsieur Charvet
      - Tarquin
        - Matchless
    - Laureate
      - Northern Farmer
    - Hackler
      - Uphantes
      - Covert Hack
      - The Hake
      - Prince Of Naples
      - Flying Hackle
        - Better Still
        - Wind Flower
        - Jim May
        - The Best
        - Dick Bell
        - Royal Hackle
        - Cheery Pat
        - Stephen
        - Royal Weaver
      - Green Hackle
      - Organdale
      - St Brendan
        - Mellifont
        - Our Stephen
      - Flaxman
      - Hack Watch
      - Royal Hackle
      - Hackenshmidt
      - Jenkinstown
      - Old Fairyhouse
      - Ballyhackle
      - Cackler
      - Covertcoat
      - Uncle George
        - Hotspur
    - Lactantius
      - Allegro
      - Gay Lothair
    - Peter Flower
    - The Lombard
    - Florist
      - Zarda
  - Kinsman
  - Cyprus
  - El Rey
  - King of Trumps
    - The Rejected
  - Lord Clive
    - Calabrais
    - La Moriniere
  - Reefer

== Pedigree ==
Pedigree of Lord Clifden, bay stallion, 1860
Sire Newminster (GB) b. 1848	Touchstone (GB) br. 1831	Camel (GB) br. 1822	Whalebone
Sire Newminster (GB) b. 1848	Touchstone (GB) br. 1831	Camel (GB) br. 1822	Selim mare
Sire Newminster (GB) b. 1848	Touchstone (GB) br. 1831	Banter (GB) br. 1826	Master Henry
Sire Newminster (GB) b. 1848	Touchstone (GB) br. 1831	Banter (GB) br. 1826	Boadicea
Sire Newminster (GB) b. 1848	Beeswing (GB) b. 1833	Doctor Syntax (GB) br. 1811	Paynator
Sire Newminster (GB) b. 1848	Beeswing (GB) b. 1833	Doctor Syntax (GB) br. 1811	Beningbrough mare
Sire Newminster (GB) b. 1848	Beeswing (GB) b. 1833	Ardrossan mare (GB) ch. 1817	Ardrossan
Sire Newminster (GB) b. 1848	Beeswing (GB) b. 1833	Ardrossan mare (GB) ch. 1817	Lady Eliza
Dam The Slave (GB) b. 1852	Melbourne (GB) br. 1834	Humphrey Clinker b. 1822	Comus
Dam The Slave (GB) b. 1852	Melbourne (GB) br. 1834	Humphrey Clinker b. 1822	Clinkerina
Dam The Slave (GB) b. 1852	Melbourne (GB) br. 1834	Cervantes mare 1825	Cervantes
Dam The Slave (GB) b. 1852	Melbourne (GB) br. 1834	Cervantes mare 1825	Golumpus mare
Dam The Slave (GB) b. 1852	Volley (GB) b. 1845	Voltaire br. 1826	Blacklock
Dam The Slave (GB) b. 1852	Volley (GB) b. 1845	Voltaire br. 1826	Phantom mare
Dam The Slave (GB) b. 1852	Volley (GB) b. 1845	Martha Lynn br. 1837	Mulatto
Dam The Slave (GB) b. 1852	Volley (GB) b. 1845	Martha Lynn br. 1837	Leda

Note: b. = Bay, br. = Brown, ch. = Chestnut
