= Ladas (horse) =

British Thoroughbred racehorse

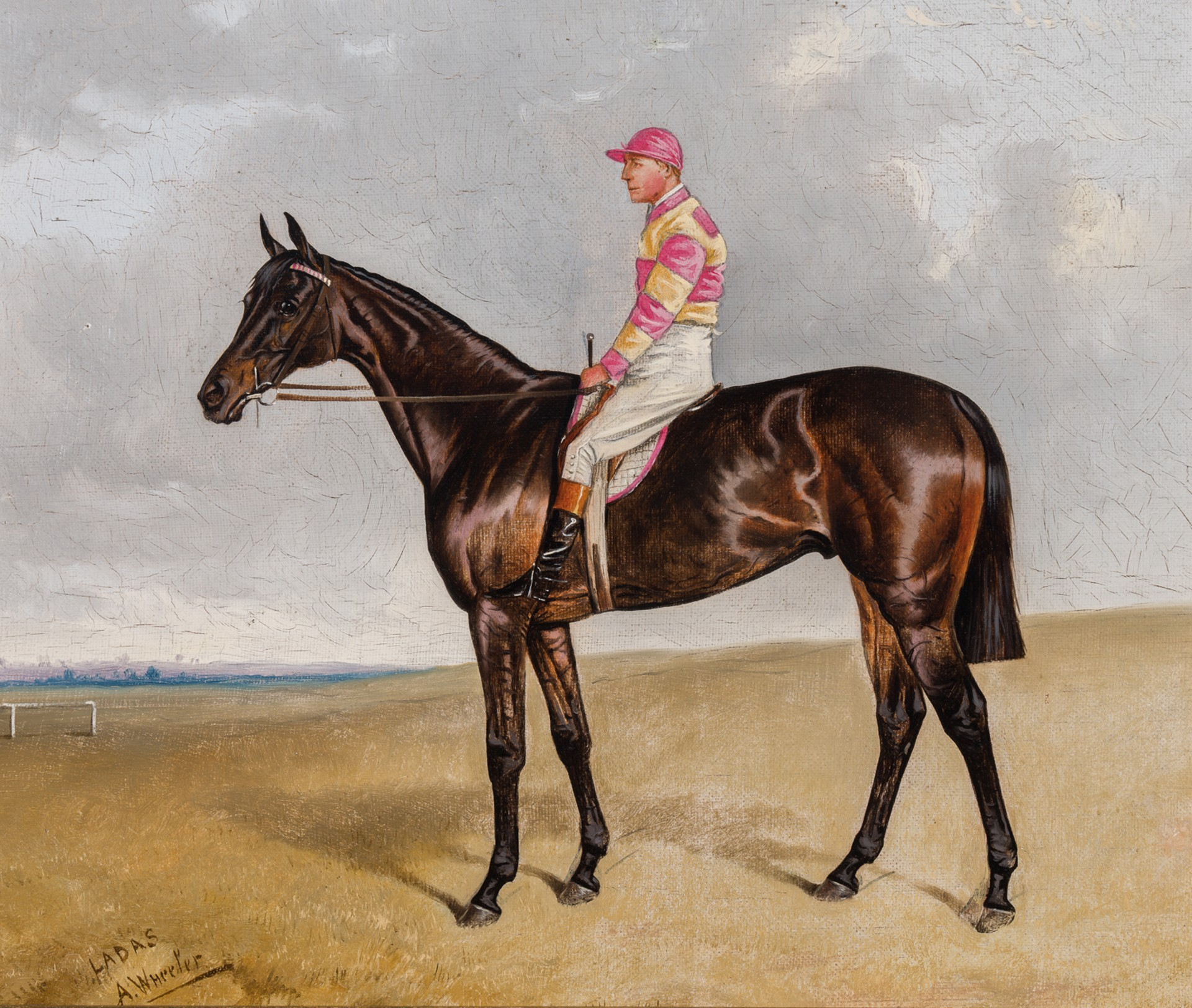
- "Ladas" painting by Alfred Wheeler
- Sire: Hampton
- Grandsire: Lord Clifden
- Dam: Illuminata
- Damsire: Rosicrucian
- Sex: Stallion
- Foaled: 1891
- Country: United Kingdom of Great Britain and Ireland
- Colour: Bay
- Breeder: Lord Rosebery
- Owner: Lord Rosebery
- Trainer: Mathew Dawson
- Record: 11: 7-2-1
- Earnings: £18,558

Major wins
- Woodcote Stakes (1893); Coventry Stakes (1893); Champagne Stakes (1893); Middle Park Plate (1893); 2000 Guineas (1894); Newmarket Stakes (1894); Epsom Derby (1894)

Ladas (1891–1914) was a British Thoroughbred racehorse and sire. His career attracted an unusual amount of attention as his owner, Lord Rosebery, became Prime Minister of the United Kingdom at the height of his success.

In a career that lasted from 1893 to 1894, Ladas ran eleven times and won seven races. He was the leading British two-year-old of 1893, being unbeaten in four starts including the Champagne Stakes and the Middle Park Stakes. In the following year, he won the 2000 Guineas at Newmarket and the Derby at Epsom to complete the first two legs of the English Triple Crown. He was beaten by the four-year-old colt Isinglass in his next two starts and failed in his bid for the Triple Crown when beaten in the St Leger at Doncaster.

Ladas was retired to stud at the end of the season, and sired the winners of several important races. He died in 1914.

== Background ==
Ladas was a bay horse of almost faultless conformation, standing just under 16 hands high. He was bred at the Crafton Stud in Buckinghamshire by his owner, Lord Rosebery, a prominent Liberal statesman who became Prime Minister in 1894. He was trained by Mathew Dawson at Newmarket, Suffolk. Dawson, who was over seventy at the time, had "retired" from large-scale training in 1885, but continued to handle a small number of horses at his Melton House Stable. Ladas was ridden in his Classic wins by Jack Watts.

Ladas's sire, named Hampton, was a successful racehorse, especially over long distances, who won both the Goodwood Cup and the Doncaster Cup. Hampton was the Champion sire in 1887 and sired, in addition to Ladas, the Derby winners Merry Hampton and Ayrshire, as well as Bay Ronald, the sire of Bayardo. Illuminata, the dam of Ladas, also produced a filly called Gas, the dam of the Derby winner Cicero, and Chelandry, who won the 1000 Guineas and herself produced the 2000 Guineas winner Neil Gow.

The name Ladas, derived from that of Alexander the Great's messenger, had previously been used by Lord Rosebery's father for a horse who ran unplaced in the 1869 Derby. Rosebery, then an under-graduate at Oxford University, had tipped the horse to his friends as a likely winner and was reportedly mortified by the result. By way of an apology, Rosebery told his friends that if he ever had a horse with a "prime chance" of winning the Derby, he would name him "Ladas" so that they could all "take the tip and back him." It was the memory of this incident which reportedly persuaded Rosebery to abandon his original plan to name the colt "Hampton Wick".

The pronunciation of the name was a point of disagreement between owner and trainer: Rosebery called the colt "Lar-dar" or "Lah-dah", while Dawson insisted on "Lay-das" or "Ley-das".

== Racing career ==
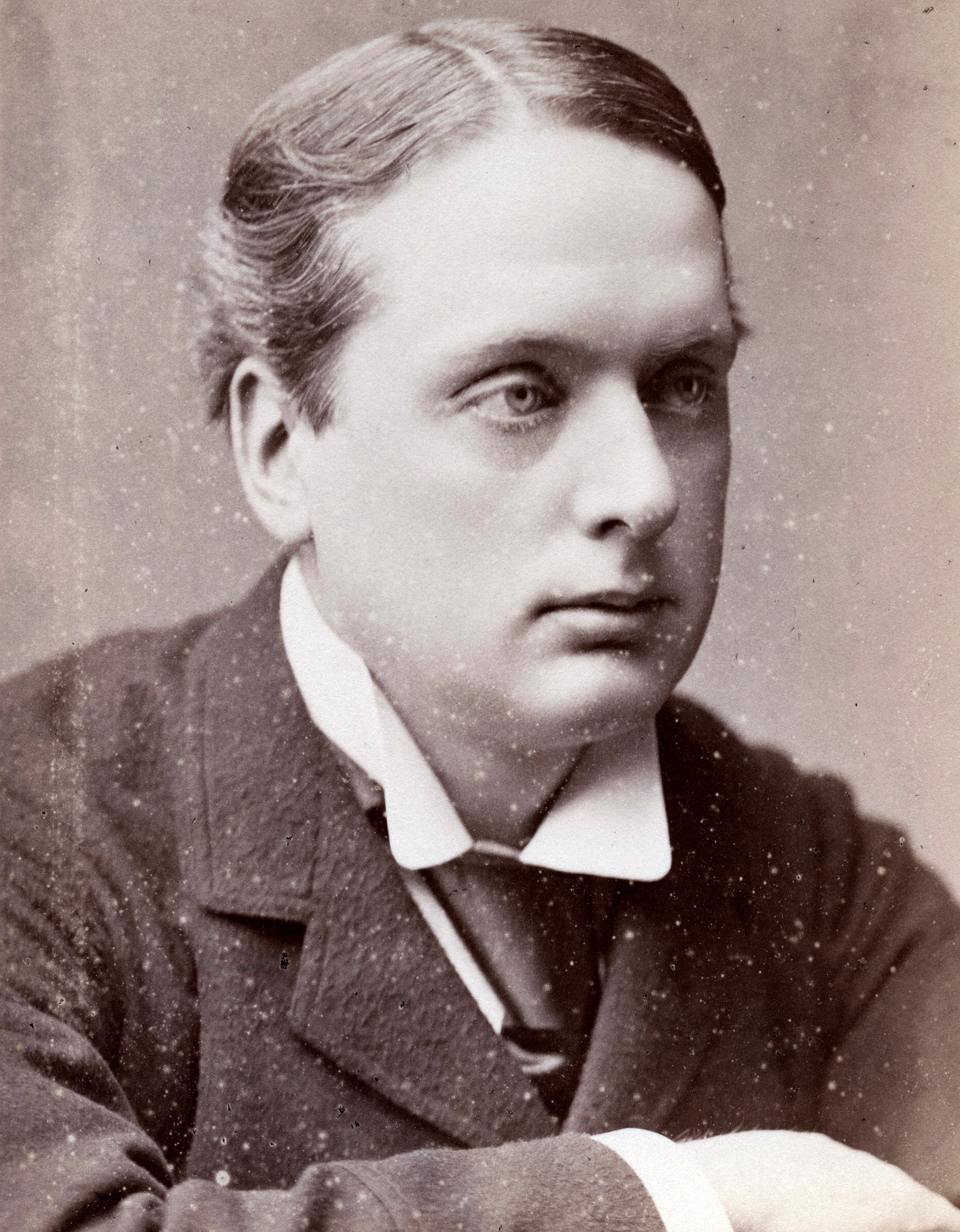
Lord Rosebery, Ladas's owner and breeder, who became Prime Minister in 1894

=== 1893: two-year-old season ===
Until 1946, racehorses in England were allowed to race without an official name and the colt who would become Ladas was still unnamed when he made a successful debut on 31 May in the Woodcote Stakes at the Epsom Derby meeting. He showed impressive acceleration to easily beat the filly Mecca and was identified as "a colt full of promise" by one correspondent. He was then sent to Royal Ascot where he started 6/4 (1.5/1) favourite for the Coventry Stakes on 13 June. He led from the start on this occasion and shook off the opposition in the closing stages to win by one and a half lengths from a colt named Bullingdon.

"The Illuminata colt", as he was still known, was then given a break of three months before returning in the Champagne Stakes at Doncaster in September, in which a horse named Sempronius was his only rival. "The Illuminata colt" led from the start, and when Sempronius moved up to challenge him, he quickened away to win easily. After his win at Doncaster, he was officially named Ladas and was then sent to Newmarket for the Middle Park Plate, the most important two-year-old race of the season. He started at odds of 1/5 (0.2/1) and was never in any danger, leading at half way and winning the race by two lengths from a filly named Jocasta, with Sempronius two lengths further back in third.

Ladas ended the season unbeaten in four races and was the winter favourite for the following year's Derby at 5/2 (2.5/1) with the Dewhurst Stakes winner Matchbox, from the stable of John Porter, being seen as his biggest potential rival.

=== 1894: three-year-old season ===
==== 2000 Guineas ====
Ladas progressed well over the winter, despite a reported bout of coughing in early March, and was sent straight for the 2000 Guineas for his first appearance of 1894. On 9 May he started at odds of 5/6 (0.83/1) in a field of eight with Matchbox the second choice on 9/2 (4.5/1). Ladas raced towards the rear in the early stages before moving into third place behind Matchbox and St Florian just after half way. Two furlongs from the finish, Watts (riding on his thirty-third birthday) moved him up to challenge for the lead and, as predicted, the race developed into a contest between Ladas and Matchbox. Matchbox "came again" after being overtaken and the colts raced together for a few strides before Ladas pulled away to win by one and a half lengths. Immediately after the race, bookmakers offered Ladas at odds of 8/13 (0.62/1) for the Derby, which was expected to be his next major target.

On 23 May Ladas started at odds of 1/12 (0.08/1) for the Newmarket Stakes against four opponents. He took the lead soon after half way and won easily ("unextended") by two lengths from St Florian. His price for the Derby was immediately shortened (reduced) to 4/9 (0.44/1). In the next two weeks, Ladas was the subject of intense interest, and was protected by a group of police detectives.

==== Epsom Derby ====
At the Epsom Derby on 6 June, Ladas was the shortest-priced favourite in the history of the Derby, starting at odds of 2/9 (0.22/1) in against six opponents. Matchbox was the second favourite on 9/1 ahead of his stable companion Bullingdon on 100/6 (16/1). Ladas started well, but was held up (restrained) by Watts and raced in fourth or fifth place in the early stages as Matchbox and Bullingdon made the running. Bullingdon weakened just after half way and Matchbox led the field into the straight, where Ladas emerged to challenge him, traveling in "grand style" and looking likely to win easily. Matchbox, however, responded well and, for the first time in his career, Ladas was placed under pressure. He "forged ahead" inside the final furlong and won the race by one and a half lengths from Matchbox, with Reminder six lengths further back in third.

The victory, which was received with "immense enthusiasm", completed a three-part prediction made by Rosebery as a student: that he would marry an heiress, become Prime Minister and win the Derby. He required the assistance of the police to extricate himself from the crush of well-wishers at the course, while at Westminster, Ladas's win was cheered in the House of Commons. By contrast, Rosebery was strongly criticised by some churchmen for involving himself in the "dishonesty and degradation" of the racing world. Rosebery, who responded to criticism by saying that he had "no vestige of shame" in owning a good horse, used the Derby win to his advantage; he presented one of Ladas's winning horseshoes as a gift to the United States ambassador Thomas F. Bayard.

==== Rivalry with Isinglass ====
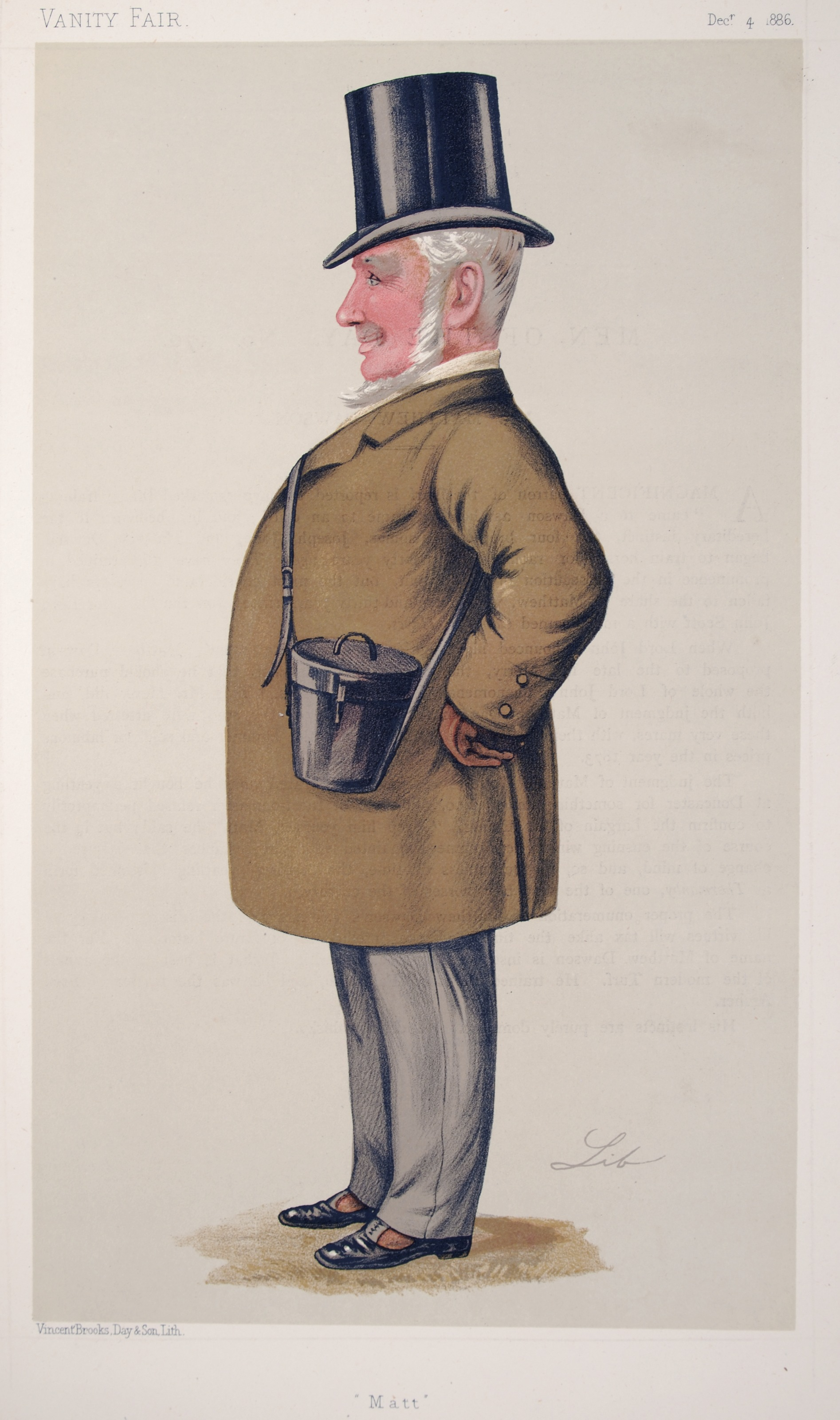
Mathew Dawson, who trained Ladas despite having officially "retired" in 1885

Ladas was then matched against Isinglass, the Triple Crown winner of 1893, in the £10,000 Princess of Wales's Stakes over one mile at Newmarket on 5 July. The race attracted a large crowd including the Prince of Wales (who supported Isinglass) and the Queen's cousin George, Duke of Cambridge (who favoured Ladas). The field also included Raeburn, the only horse to have beaten Isinglass, Ravensbury, who had won impressively at Royal Ascot, and Bullingdon, who had recovered from the bout of coughing that had reportedly affected him at Epsom. The early pace was slow, and Watts held Ladas up behind the leaders before moving into the lead just over a furlong out. He was immediately challenged, however, and overtaken inside the final furlong by both Isinglass and Bullingdon. Isinglass prevailed by a short head with Ladas, who was eased in the closing stages, finishing a well-beaten third. Ladas appeared to be perfectly sound after the race, and the only explanation offered (by The Sportsman) was that the slow pace (the winning time was 1:48.4) had produced a false result.

In the Eclipse Stakes at Sandown on 20 July, Ladas met Isinglass again, this time over ten furlongs on soft ground. Isinglass started favourite at 4/5 (0.8/1) with Ladas on 13/8 (1.6/1) and the other runners, who included Raeburn, Ravensbury and a filly named Throstle virtually ignored. The outsider Priestholme set off at an unsustainably fast pace, followed by Isinglass, with Watts restraining Ladas towards the rear. Priestholme dropped away in the straight, leaving Isinglass in the lead with Watts moving Ladas up to challenge. The two Derby winners dominated the race in the closing stages but in spite of a "game pursuit", Ladas was unable to overhaul Isinglass, who won by a length with the rest of the field, headed by Throstle, well beaten. There were no excuses for Ladas: Watts admitted that he had been beaten by a better horse.

==== St Leger ====
Ladas was sent to Doncaster for the St Leger on 12 September in an attempt to win the Triple Crown. Ridden by Tommy Loates, Ladas started at odds of 10/11 (0.9/1) in a field of eight, with Matchbox (ridden by Watts) the second choice on 2/1 and the filly Throstle ignored on 50/1. As usual, Ladas was held up at the back of the field as, at first Throstle, then a horse named Legal Tender, then Matchbox made the running. Ladas moved steadily closer and turned into the straight in second, before overtaking Matchbox and going into a clear lead. In the final furlong, however, he was challenged by Throstle, and in the closing stages the latter pulled ahead to win by three quarters of a length. According to The Sportsman, the cheers of the crowd were replaced by those of the bookmakers as the outsider overhauled the favourite.

=== 1895: four-year-old season ===
Ladas was kept in training as a four-year-old for the 1895 season. Rosebery issued a challenge to Isinglass's owner, Harry McCalmont, for a match race between Ladas and Isinglass to take place at Newmarket in May. McCalmont declined as he did not want to disrupt his horse's preparation for the Ascot Gold Cup.

Ladas had a series of training problems which kept him off the course for most of the season and he was also becoming "short-tempered and impetuous". He made his belated seasonal reappearance at Newmarket on 27 September, when he ran in the £10,000 Jockey Club Stakes. Although Ladas was reported to be running with only two sound legs, he was his owner's first choice ahead of his 1895 Derby winner, Sir Visto. Carrying top weight of 142 pounds, he raced in third place for most of the way but weakened in the closing stages. He finished fourth of the eleven runners behind horses named Laveno, None The Wiser and Venia. Despite Ladas's disappointing season, Rosebery turned down a reported offer of £20,000 for the colt, preferring instead to retire him to his own stud.

== Assessment and earnings ==
Before Ladas ran as a three-year-old, Mat Dawson, who had been training horses, including more than twenty classic winners since the 1850s, was reported to have called Ladas the best he had ever trained. Later that season he ranked him second, slightly behind St. Simon. Henry Chaplin, the owner of Hermit, called Ladas the finest horse he had seen. In June 1894 Ladas was rated fourteen pounds superior to the Derby winner Sir Visto by Dawson, who trained both horses.

Ladas earned £5,768 as a two-year-old, placing him sixth among British horses for 1894. He added £12,790 in 1895.

== Stud career ==
Ladas had some success at stud, siring the Classic winners Gorgos and Troutbeck. Another successful offspring was the gelding Epsom Lad, who won the Eclipse Stakes and the Princess of Wales's Stakes as a four-year-old in 1901. In total, he sired the winners of 196 races and £97,000 in winnings. By 1912 he had been retired from active stud duty and become extremely bad tempered: one writer said that the old stallion had "worn himself out with his restlessness and peevishness". He died on 31 March 1914 at his owner's stud at Mentmore.

== Sire line tree ==
- Ladas
  - Epsom Lad
  - Gorgos
    - Gorgorito
    - Listman
    - Bridaine
    - Sourbier
  - Troutbeck

== Pedigree ==
Pedigree of Ladas (GB), bay stallion, 1891
Sire Hampton (GB) 1872	Lord Clifden; 1860	Newminster	Touchstone*
Sire Hampton (GB) 1872	Lord Clifden; 1860	Newminster	Beewsing
Sire Hampton (GB) 1872	Lord Clifden; 1860	The Slave	Melbourne*
Sire Hampton (GB) 1872	Lord Clifden; 1860	The Slave	Volley
Sire Hampton (GB) 1872	Lady Langden; 1868	Kettledrum	Rataplan
Sire Hampton (GB) 1872	Lady Langden; 1868	Kettledrum	Hybla
Sire Hampton (GB) 1872	Lady Langden; 1868	Haricot	Lanercost
Sire Hampton (GB) 1872	Lady Langden; 1868	Haricot	Queen Mary*
Dam Iluminata (GB) 1877	Rosicrucian; 1865	Beadsman	Weatherbit
Dam Iluminata (GB) 1877	Rosicrucian; 1865	Beadsman	Mendicant
Dam Iluminata (GB) 1877	Rosicrucian; 1865	Madame Eglentine	Cowl
Dam Iluminata (GB) 1877	Rosicrucian; 1865	Madame Eglentine	Diversion
Dam Iluminata (GB) 1877	Paraffin; 1870	Blair Athol	Stockwell
Dam Iluminata (GB) 1877	Paraffin; 1870	Blair Athol	Blink Bonny*
Dam Iluminata (GB) 1877	Paraffin; 1870	Paradigm	Paragone*
Dam Iluminata (GB) 1877	Paraffin; 1870	Paradigm	Ellen Horne (Family: 1-l)

* Ladas is inbred 4S x 5D to the stallion Touchstone, meaning that he appears fourth generation on the sire side of his pedigree, and fifth generation (via Paragone) on the dam side of his pedigree.

* Ladas is inbred 4S x 5D to the stallion Melbourne, meaning that he appears fourth generation on the sire side of his pedigree, and fifth generation (via Blink Bonny) on the dam side of his pedigree.

* Ladas is inbred 4S x 5D to the mare Queen Mary, meaning that she appears fourth generation on the sire side of his pedigree, and fifth generation (via Blink Bonny) on the dam side of his pedigree.
