= Buchanan (horse) =

American-bred Thoroughbred racehorse

- Sire: Buckden
- Grandsire: Lord Clifden
- Dam: Mrs. Grigsby
- Damsire: Wagner
- Sex: Stallion
- Foaled: 1881
- Country: United States
- Colour: Chestnut
- Breeder: William Cottrill & J. W. Guest
- Owner: William Cottrill & Samuel S. Brown
- Trainer: William Bird
- Record: 35: 8-14-10
- Earnings: $13,110

Major wins
- Ripple Stakes (1884); Clark Handicap (1884) American Classic Race wins: Kentucky Derby (1884)

Buchanan (1881 – May 28, 1894) was an American thoroughbred racehorse and was the winner of the 1884 Kentucky Derby, Ripple Stakes and Clark Stakes. Buchanan had not achieved a race win before competing in the Kentucky Derby and by contemporary accounts was a difficult and unruly mount. He was ridden in the 1884 derby by the great African-American jockey Isaac Burns Murphy, who won three Kentucky Derbys in his lifetime (1884, 1890, and 1891).

Buchanan retired from racing at age three and lived the remainder of his days at the Senorita Stock Farm in Lexington, Kentucky, site of the present day Kentucky Horse Park. He had limited success as a stud, siring only three stakes winners. His most successful son was the Latonia Derby winner Buck McCann.

Buchanan does not appear in the stud books after 1897 and was reported to have died at the age of 17 by a 1910 Daily Racing Form article.

The Semi-weekly Interior Journal of Stanford, KY reported on June 1, 1894, that Buchanan died after a sudden illness of inflammation of the bowels.

== Pedigree ==
Pedigree of Buchanan
Sire Buckden 1869	Lord Clifden 1860	Newminster	Touchstone
Sire Buckden 1869	Lord Clifden 1860	Newminster	Beeswing
Sire Buckden 1869	Lord Clifden 1860	The Slave	Melbourne
Sire Buckden 1869	Lord Clifden 1860	The Slave	Volley
Sire Buckden 1869	Consequence 1857	Bay Middleton	Sultan
Sire Buckden 1869	Consequence 1857	Bay Middleton	Cobweb
Sire Buckden 1869	Consequence 1857	Result	Mulatto
Sire Buckden 1869	Consequence 1857	Result	Problem
Dam Mrs Grigsby 1861	Wagner 1834	Sir Charles	Sir Archy*
Dam Mrs Grigsby 1861	Wagner 1834	Sir Charles	Citizen Mare
Dam Mrs Grigsby 1861	Wagner 1834	Maria West	Marion*
Dam Mrs Grigsby 1861	Wagner 1834	Maria West	Ella Crump
Dam Mrs Grigsby 1861	Folly 1853	Yorkshire	St Nicholas
Dam Mrs Grigsby 1861	Folly 1853	Yorkshire	Miss Rose
Dam Mrs Grigsby 1861	Folly 1853	Fury	Priam
Dam Mrs Grigsby 1861	Folly 1853	Fury	Velocipede Mare

* Buchanan is inbred 4D x 5D to the stallion Sir Archy, meaning that he appears fourth generation and fifth generation (via Marion) on the dam side of his pedigree.
