= Colonel Holloway =

American-bred Thoroughbred racehorse

- Sire: Ethelbert
- Grandsire: Eothen
- Dam: Sweet Hawthorne
- Damsire: Lazzarone
- Sex: Stallion
- Foaled: 1909
- Country: United States
- Color: Brown
- Breeder: Raceland Farm (Catesby Woodford)
- Owner: Beverwyck Stable
- Trainer: Dave Woodford
- Record: 44: 7-7-6 (1912); 48: 2-9-3 (1915)
- Earnings: $8,777 (1912) $1,225 (1915)

Major wins
- American Classics wins: Preakness Stakes (1912)
- Last updated on June 7, 2021

Colonel Holloway (foaled in 1909) was an American Thoroughbred racehorse best known for winning the 1912 Preakness Stakes.

== Background ==
Colonel Holloway was bred by Catesby Woodford of Raceland Farm near Paris, Kentucky and raced by Frank J. Nolan's Beverwyck Stable. He was trained by Dave Woodford.

== Racing career ==
For his Preakness win, Colonel Holloway was ridden by jockey Clarence Turner. Colonel Holloway was not among the original entries for the race, but was added to the field after winning the Maryland Club purse earlier in the day. He started at odds of 8/5 and won from Bwana Tumbo and Tipsand. The race was run as a handicap, with Colonel Holloway carrying 107 pounds, thirteen pounds less than the runner-up. Records show the colt ran second to Sotemia in the four mile Kentucky Endurance Stakes in October of the same year.

As of 1915, Colonel Holloway was still racing in the United States and in Canada. His owner was listed as D.J. Scanlon. By 1920, Colonel Holloway was still racing at Timonium, Maryland but was considered to be no longer in good physical condition by the press.

== After racing ==
No records have been found of any progeny of Colonel Holloway or of his death.

== Pedigree ==
Pedigree of Colonel Holloway (USA), brown stallion, 1914
Sire Ethelbert (USA) 1896	Eothen (GB); 1883	Hampton	Lord Clifden*
Sire Ethelbert (USA) 1896	Eothen (GB); 1883	Hampton	Lady Langden
Sire Ethelbert (USA) 1896	Eothen (GB); 1883	Sultana	Oxford
Sire Ethelbert (USA) 1896	Eothen (GB); 1883	Sultana	Besika
Sire Ethelbert (USA) 1896	Maori (GB); 1885	Poulet (FR)	Peut Etre
Sire Ethelbert (USA) 1896	Maori (GB); 1885	Poulet (FR)	Printaniere
Sire Ethelbert (USA) 1896	Maori (GB); 1885	Queen of Cyprus	King Tom
Sire Ethelbert (USA) 1896	Maori (GB); 1885	Queen of Cyprus	Cypriana
Dam Sweet Hawthorne (USA) 1898	Lazzarone (USA); 1891	Spendthrift	Australian
Dam Sweet Hawthorne (USA) 1898	Lazzarone (USA); 1891	Spendthrift	Aerolite
Dam Sweet Hawthorne (USA) 1898	Lazzarone (USA); 1891	Spinaway	Leamington
Dam Sweet Hawthorne (USA) 1898	Lazzarone (USA); 1891	Spinaway	Megara
Dam Sweet Hawthorne (USA) 1898	Bridal (GB); 1885	Cadet (HUN)	Buccaneer (GB)
Dam Sweet Hawthorne (USA) 1898	Bridal (GB); 1885	Cadet (HUN)	Dahlia (GB)
Dam Sweet Hawthorne (USA) 1898	Bridal (GB); 1885	Fleur d'Oranger	Lord Clifden*
Dam Sweet Hawthorne (USA) 1898	Bridal (GB); 1885	Fleur d'Oranger	Sweet Hawthorn (Family 4-k)

* Colonel Holloway is inbred 4S x 4D to the stallion Lord Clifden, meaning that he appears fourth generation on the sire side of his pedigree, and fourth generation on the dam side of his pedigree.
