= Herbert Jones (jockey) =

British jockey

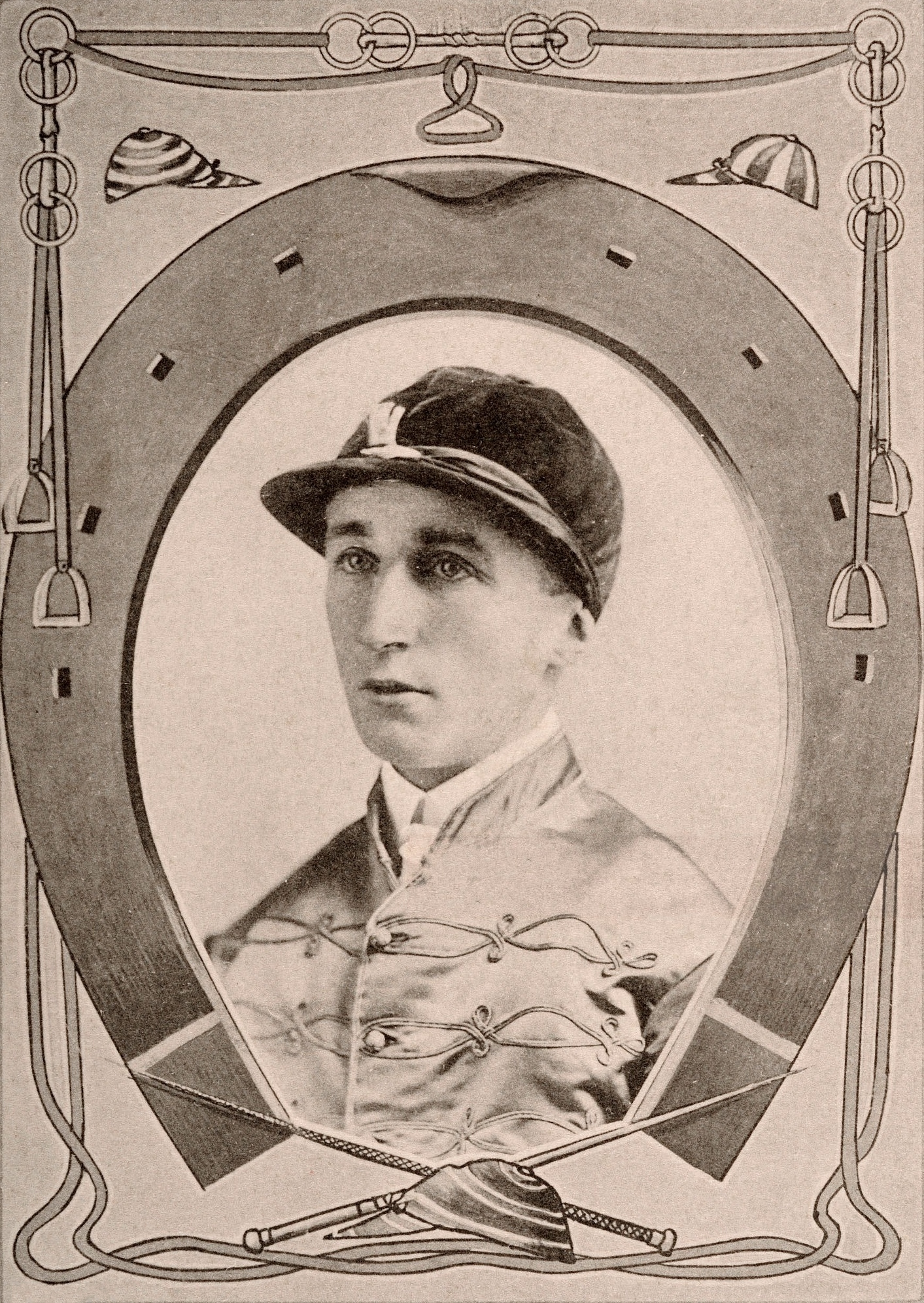
- Jones on a postcard, c. 1900.

Personal information
- Born: 30 November 1880 Epsom, Surrey, England
- Died: 18 July 1951 (aged 70)
- Occupation: Jockey

Horse racing career
- Sport: Horse racing
- Career wins: 540 in U.K. 1896–1923

Major racing wins
- British Classic Race wins: 2,000 Guineas (1900, 1905, 1906, 1909); Epsom Derby (1900, 1909); St. Leger Stakes (1900); Epsom Oaks (1905) Other Races Coronation Stakes (1910); Sussex Stakes (1910)

Significant horses
- Diamond Jubilee, Minoru, Oskar

Herbert Ebsworth Jones, often known as Bertie, (30 November 1880 – 18 July 1951) was an English Thoroughbred horse racing jockey.

He often rode for King Edward VII, and in 1909 he rode the first Derby winner owned by a British monarch. He remains one of only fifteen jockeys to win the British Triple Crown.

== The Triple Crown ==
Son of the jumping trainer Jack Jones, young Herbert was apprenticed to Richard Marsh at the age of ten and rode his first winner in 1896.

In 1909, he won the British Triple Crown when he rode Diamond Jubilee to victory in the 2,000 Guineas Stakes, Epsom Derby and St. Leger Stakes. He was the work rider for the temperamental Diamond Jubilee and it was observed that this wayward colt went better for him than for any more established jockey. Diamond Jubilee had rolled on his race rider Mornington Cannon after a gallop just before the 2,000 Guineas. Hence Jones gained his chance and won the Triple Crown on the Prince of Wales's horse.

== Later career ==
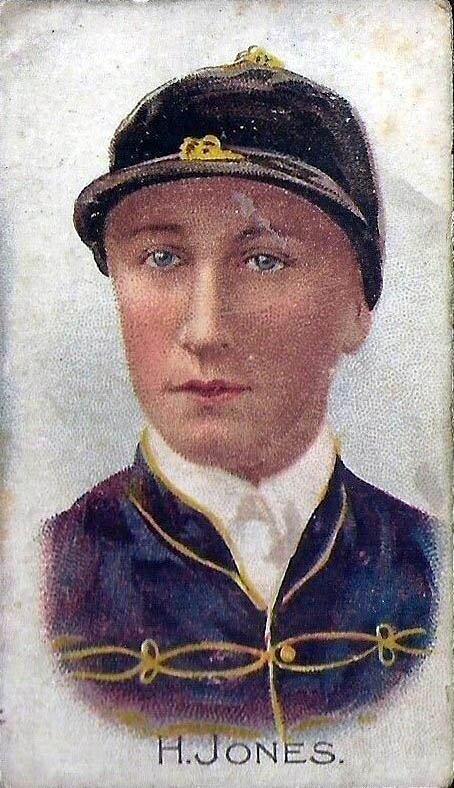
Jones, in the royal colours, from a 1906 cigarette card

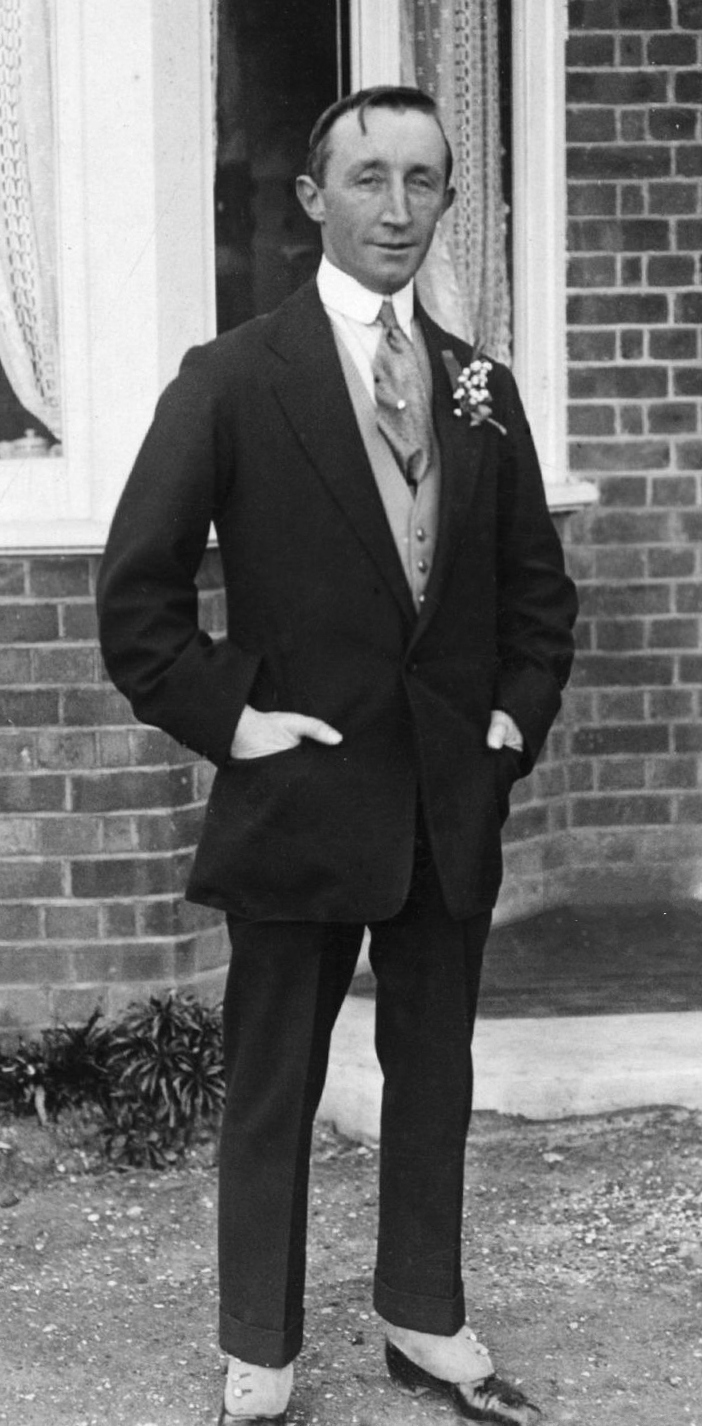
Jones in 1910.

Among his other Classic victories, he won the 1905 Epsom Oaks, a second Derby in 1909, and the 2,000 Guineas on three more occasions.

In the 1909 Derby on 26 May, Jones rode Minoru to victory at odds of 7/2 in a field of fifteen. This was the first time a horse owned by a British reigning monarch had won the race. The victory for the "royal" colt provoked "the wildest scenes of enthusiasm ever known in England", including a mass rendition of the National Anthem as the King led his horse to the winner's enclosure.

In 1913, Jones rode another of the King's horses, Anmer, in the Derby. He was involved in a collision with Emily Davison, the suffragette, who was fatally injured. The horse knocked Davison over, turned a somersault and landed on Jones. He suffered significant injuries, including a mild concussion and was unconscious for a short time. He also needed a sling on his arm for a short while afterwards. His injuries stopped him from attending Davison's funeral, to which he was invited. King George recorded in his diary that "poor Herbert Jones and Anmer had been sent flying" on a "most disappointing day" and Queen Alexandra sent him a get well telegram after the "sad accident caused through the abominable conduct of a brutal lunatic woman". Within two weeks, he was well enough to ride Anmer at Royal Ascot.

Fifteen years later, he laid a wreath at the funeral of Emmeline Pankhurst in honour of her and Emily Davison.

Jones retired from riding in 1923. His last major win had been the Nunthorpe Stakes in 1922 on Two Step.

== Death ==
Late in his life, Jones became deaf and suffered two strokes. In 1951, soon after his wife's death and his onset of depression, he was discovered to have committed suicide after his son found him in a gas-filled kitchen. The idea that he had been "haunted" by the death of Davison and that this was the reason for his suicide were "an utter load of rubbish" according to his son John. There was nothing in a 1934 ghost-written feature in the Sunday Express that suggested he was long-term affected by it, and it is more likely that grief over his wife and deafness caused him to take his own life. He had in fact, been "gregarious, happy and contented" with an interest in gardening and local sports until the loss of his hearing.

== Major wins ==
(United Kingdom) Great Britain

- 2000 Guineas Stakes - (4) - Diamond Jubilee (1900), Vedas (1905), Gorgos (1906), Minoru (1909)
- Derby Stakes - (2) - Diamond Jubilee (1900), Minoru (1909)
- Oaks Stakes - Cherry Lass (1905)
- St Leger Stakes - Diamond Jubilee (1900)
- Eclipse Stakes - Diamond Jubilee (1900)
- Middle Park Stakes - Friar Marcus (1914)
- Nunthorpe Stakes - Two Step (1922)
- St. James's Palace Stakes - (2) - Cherry Lass (1905), Minoru (1909)
- Sussex Stakes - (4) - Stephanas (1903), Troutbeck (1906), Minoru (1909), Winkipop (1910)

== See also ==
- List of jockeys
