= Gorgos =

British-bred Thoroughbred racehorse

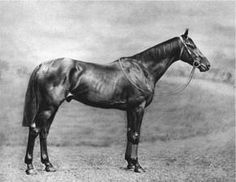
- Gorgos circa 1903
- Sire: Ladas
- Grandsire: Hampton
- Dam: The Gorgon
- Damsire: St Simon
- Sex: Stallion
- Foaled: 1903
- Country: United Kingdom
- Colour: Brown
- Breeder: Arthur James
- Owner: Arthur James
- Trainer: Richard Marsh
- Record: 9: 3-1-2

Major wins
- July Stakes (1905); Prince of Wales's Stakes (1905); 2000 Guineas (1906)

Gorgos (1903 – 1920) was a British Thoroughbred racehorse and sire. He showed considerable promise as a two-year-old in 1905 when he won two of his four races including the July Stakes. In the following spring he recorded an upset victory in the 2000 Guineas but was beaten in all of his subsequent races. He was retired from racing at the end of the year and became a successful breeding stallion in France.

== Background ==
Gorgos was a brown horse bred and owned by Arthur James. The colt was sent into training with Richard Marsh at his Egerton House stable in Newmarket, Suffolk.

Gorgos was one of the best horses sired by Ladas who won the 2000 Guineas and the Epsom Derby in 1894. His dam The Gorgon, was a high class racehorse who won the New Stakes for Arthur James in 1899 and later became a successful broodmare whose other descendants included Nebbiolo.

== Racing career ==
=== 1905: two-year-old season ===
Gorgos made little impact on his racecourse debut in June 1905 when he finished unplaced in the Triennial Stakes at Royal Ascot. In the following month, ridden by Herbert Jones he won July Stakes over five and a half furlongs at Newmarket Racecourse at odds of 7/4 from the favoured Alcanzor. A month later he led from start to finish to win the Prince of Wales's Stakes at Goodwood Racecourse. On his final start of the year he finished third in the Boscawen Stakes at Newmarket in autumn.

=== 1906: three-year-old season ===
On 2 May Gorgos, with Herbert Jones in the saddle, started a 20/1 outsider in field of twelve for the 98th running of the 2000 Guineas over the Rowley Mile course for which the leading contenders appeared to be Gingal (runner-up in the Dewhurst Stakes) Bill of Play, Admiral Crichton, Beppo and Frustrator. The Coventry Stakes winner Black Arrow delayed the start with his "obstreperous" behaviour but then started quickly and led the field to halfway with Gorgos settled behind the leaders. Approaching the last quarter mile Ramrod and Admiable Crichton disputed the lead but the pair then swerved towards the centre of the track allowing Gorgos and the unnamed "Dame Agneta colt" (later named Sancy) to join the issue. In a closely contested finish Gorgos prevailed by a head from the Dame Agneta colt, with Ramrod a neck away in third.

Two weeks later the colt was moved up in distance for the Newmarket Stakes over ten furlongs and finished third behind Lally and Malua. In the Derby over 1 1/2 miles at Epsom Racecourse on 30 May Gorgos started the 10/1 fifth favourite but was never in serious contention and finished seventh behind Spearmint. At Goodwood on 2 August Gorgos was stepped up in distance and matched against older horses to contest the Goodwood Cup over 2 1/2 miles and finished third behind Plum Tree. On 12 September the colt ran in the St Leger over 14 1/2 furlongs at Doncaster Racecourse but after being left behind in a "shockingly bad" start he finished unplaced behind Troutbeck. Gorgos was "badly knocked about" in the race and never ran competitively again.

== Assessment and honours ==
In their book, A Century of Champions, based on the Timeform rating system, John Randall and Tony Morris rated Gorgos a "poor" winner of the 2000 Guineas.

== Stud record ==
In 1907, Gorgos was sold to the 11th Duc de Gramont and exported to become a breeding stallion in France. The best of his offspring included Sourbier (Prix du Jockey Club), Gorgorito (Prix Royal Oak), Bridaine (Prix du Cadran) and Listman (Poule d'Essai des Poulains). Gorgos died in France in July 1920.

== Pedigree ==
Pedigree of Gorgos (GB), brown stallion, 1903
Sire Ladas (GB) 1891	Hampton (GB); 1872	Lord Clifden	Newminster
Sire Ladas (GB) 1891	Hampton (GB); 1872	Lord Clifden	The Slave
Sire Ladas (GB) 1891	Hampton (GB); 1872	Lady Langden	Kettledrum
Sire Ladas (GB) 1891	Hampton (GB); 1872	Lady Langden	Haricot
Sire Ladas (GB) 1891	Illuminata (GB); 1877	Rosicrucian	Beadsman
Sire Ladas (GB) 1891	Illuminata (GB); 1877	Rosicrucian	Madame Eglentine
Sire Ladas (GB) 1891	Illuminata (GB); 1877	Paraffin	Blair Athol
Sire Ladas (GB) 1891	Illuminata (GB); 1877	Paraffin	Paradigm*
Dam The Gorgon (GB) 1897	St Simon (GB); 1881	Galopin	Vedette
Dam The Gorgon (GB) 1897	St Simon (GB); 1881	Galopin	Flying Duchess
Dam The Gorgon (GB) 1897	St Simon (GB); 1881	St Angela	King Tom*
Dam The Gorgon (GB) 1897	St Simon (GB); 1881	St Angela	Adeline
Dam The Gorgon (GB) 1897	Andromeda (GB); 1890	Minting	Lord Lyon*
Dam The Gorgon (GB) 1897	Andromeda (GB); 1890	Minting	Mint Sauce
Dam The Gorgon (GB) 1897	Andromeda (GB); 1890	Stella	Mogador*
Dam The Gorgon (GB) 1897	Andromeda (GB); 1890	Stella	Rondoletta (Family 19-c)

* Gorgos is inbred 4S x 5D to the mare Paradigm, meaning that she appears fourth generation on the sire side of his pedigree, and fifth generation (via Lord Lyon) on the dam side of his pedigree.

* Gorgos is inbred 4D x 5D to the stallion King Tom, meaning that he appears fourth generation and fifth generation (via Mogador) on the dam side of his pedigree.
