= Minoru (horse) =

Irish-bred Thoroughbred racehorse

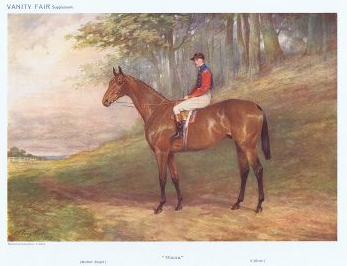
- Minoru as depicted in Vanity Fair, September 1909
- Sire: Cyllene
- Grandsire: Bona Vista
- Dam: Mother Siegel
- Damsire: Friar's Balsam
- Sex: Stallion
- Foaled: 1906
- Country: Ireland
- Colour: Bay
- Breeder: William Hall-Walker
- Owner: King Edward VII
- Trainer: Richard Marsh
- Record: 13: 7-2-2,
- Earnings: £16,180

Major wins
- Greenham Stakes (1909); 2,000 Guineas (1909); Epsom Derby (1909); St. James's Palace Stakes (1909); Sussex Stakes (1909)

Honours
- Minoru - British Rail Locomotive #60062

Minoru (1906 – circa 1917) was an Irish-bred, British-trained Thoroughbred racehorse who won two British Classic Races. In a career which lasted from June 1908 to April 1910 he ran thirteen times and won seven races. After showing moderate form as a two-year-old he improved to become one of the best colts in England in the early part of 1909. He won his first five races including the 2000 Guineas and the Derby. His win at Epsom Downs Racecourse made his owner King Edward VII the first reigning British monarch to win a Derby and was greeted with unprecedented celebration. Minoru's bid to win the British Triple Crown ended when he was beaten by Bayardo in the St Leger. He was retired to stud in 1910 and was soon afterwards exported to Russia, where he disappeared during the Revolution in 1917.

A then popular game of chance, which simulates a horse race in miniature, had been named after Minoru.

== Background ==
Minoru was a bay horse bred by Colonel William Hall-Walker (later Lord Wavertree) at his stud farm at Tully in County Kildare which today is the Irish National Stud. Minoru was a son of Cyllene, winner of the 1899 Ascot Gold Cup who sired three other Epsom Derby winners, but was exported to Argentina in January 1908, before his true quality as a stallion became evident. His dam was Mother Siegel, a daughter of the highly regarded multiple stakes winner, Friar's Balsam. The colt was leased by his breeder to King Edward VII along with five other yearlings. Minoru was trained by Richard Marsh at his Egerton House stable at Newmarket, Suffolk: Marsh was the established "Royal" trainer, having prepared both Persimmon and Diamond Jubilee to win the Derby for Edward when he was Prince of Wales.

== Racing career ==
=== 1908: two-year-old season ===
Minoru began his racing career impressively, by winning the five furlong Great Surrey Foal Stakes at Epsom, on 5 June, the day that Signorinetta won The Oaks. His subsequent performances in 1908 were disappointing. He finished second to Louviers when strongly fancied for the Coventry Stakes at Royal Ascot in June and was second again to Battleaxe in the July Stakes at Newmarket. After a break, Minoru returned to Newmarket in autumn for two further races. He finished third in the Hopeful Stakes, and third again in the New Nursery, a handicap race for two-year-olds. In the Free Handicap, an end-of-season ranking of the best two-year-olds Bayardo was ranked top with 126 pounds, while Minoru was unrated, meaning that he was at least twenty-two pounds behind the leader. At the end of the year he was considered "useful", but not top class. Marsh, however, thought highly of the colt: when asked to assess the six horses leased by the King from Colonel Hall-Walker, he commented, "I like Minoru best. He is a bit on the leg, but a fine and resolute goer."

=== 1909: three-year-old season ===
==== Spring ====
During the winter of 1908–1909, Minoru made exceptional progress, and although the King's racing manager, Marcus Beresford, was initially sceptical, Marsh decided to train the colt for the Classics. The cold weather early in the year delayed the preparation of many horses, including Bayardo, but the lightly-made Minoru took little work to reach peak fitness, giving him an advantage over most of his rivals. After performing impressively in a private trial race, Minoru made his debut in the Greenham Stakes at Newbury on 31 March and won from Valens under top weight of 136 pounds. In the 2000 Guineas at Newmarket on 28 April he started at odds of 4/1 against ten opponents and was regarded as the chief danger to the favourite Bayardo. Ridden by Herbert Jones he raced prominently before accelerating through a narrowing gap in the closing stages and won easily from Phaleron and Louviers, with Bayardo fourth, in a race record time of 1:37.8. According to press reports the victory was greeted with "intense enthusiasm". Minoru was given very little work by Marsh before his next run in the Derby.

==== Summer ====
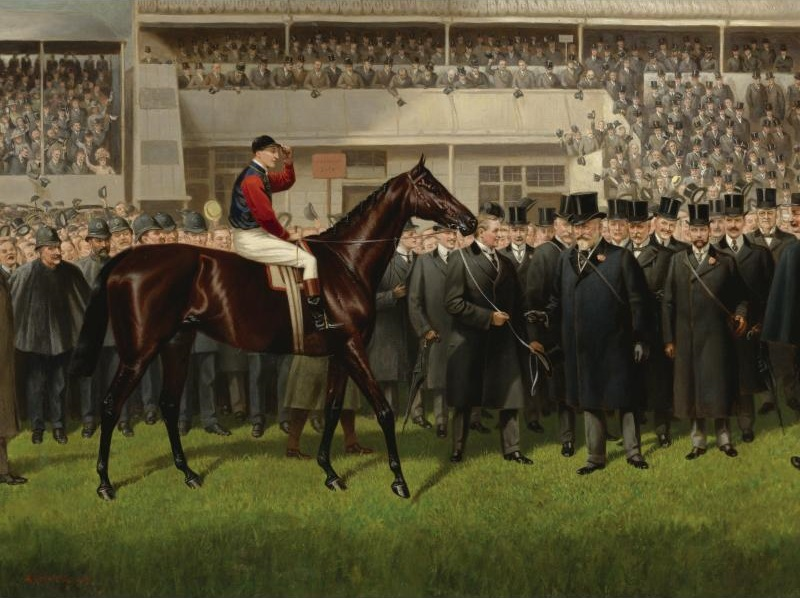
Minoru with Herbert Jones up in the Winner's Circle at Epsom. Painting by Alfred Charles Havell

At Epsom on 26 May, Minoru started at odds of 7/2 in a field of fifteen, with Bayardo and the American-bred Sir Martin, who started favourite, being seen as his main rivals. The crowd was smaller than usual on account of heavy rain on the morning of the race, but the King and Queen were in attendance. Minoru broke slowly on the inside but recovered quickly and by the beginning of the turn into the straight was in fourth place behind Louviers, Brooklands and Sir Martin, and just ahead of William the Fourth. At this point the race changed completely as Sir Martin, who had been traveling extremely well, stumbled in close quarters and lost his rider, badly interfering with William the Fourth. In the straight the race developed into a match between Minoru and Louviers who raced together throughout the last two furlongs, with first one and then the other appearing to have the advantage. The two colts crossed the line together, just ahead of William the Fourth who finished very strongly after recovering from the earlier incident, and looked an unlucky loser. After a long delay, the judge announced Minoru as the winner by a short head from Louviers, many of whose supporters were convinced that he had won. Valens finished fourth and Bayardo fifth. The victory for the "Royal" colt provoked "the wildest scenes of enthusiasm ever known in England", including a mass rendition of the National Anthem as the King led his horse to the winner's enclosure. Minoru himself was "swallowed up" by a crowd of supporters, several of whom attempted to obtain souvenirs by pulling hairs from his mane and tail, while his owner was informally congratulated with cries of "Good for you old sport!" and "Well done Teddy!". Minoru's victory was the first in the Derby for a reigning British monarch. The King received many congratulatory telegrams, his favourite reportedly being one which arrived from Argentina and read: "Minoru, England. Congratulations from your father– Cyllene."

Minoru followed up his win at Epsom by running in the St. James's Palace Stakes over one mile at Royal Ascot, in which he started at odds of 1/3 and won from The Story and Blankney II. Minoru was then sent to Goodwood on 29 July for the Sussex Stakes, another one mile race which at that time was restricted to three-year-olds. Minoru carried 134 pounds and won very easily from his two opponents, Prester Jack and Verney.

==== Autumn ====
On 8 September Minoru attempted to complete the British Triple Crown in the St Leger at Doncaster. Bayardo had meanwhile won four successive races including an easy win over Louviers at Sandown. Minoru started second favourite and finished fourth of the seven runners, six lengths behind Bayardo, who won from Valens and Mirador. Minoru had little luck in running, being unable to obtain a clear run along the rails, but appeared to have been well beaten on merit. Herbert Jones offered no excuses, and admitted that in view of Bayardo's superiority, Minoru had been "a lucky animal" to win the 2000 Guineas and Derby. On his final start of the season, he was sent to Newmarket in October for the Free Handicap, in which he defeated the filly Electra, the winner of the 1000 Guineas and Epsom Oaks, by a neck. As Jones had been injured the previous day, Minoru was ridden on this occasion by Danny Maher, who was presented by the King with a jewelled scarf-pin in recognition of his success.

Minoru's performances in 1909 was the key factor in his sire Cyllene being the 1909 Leading sire in Great Britain & Ireland. His prize money of £15,246 placed him second to Bayardo on the list of leading British money-winners.

=== 1910: four-year-old season ===
Minoru was kept in training as a four-year-old with the Ascot Gold Cup as his principal target, but began to develop problems with his eyes. He made his debut in the City and Suburban Handicap at Epsom on 26 April and started 3/1 favourite, but finished seventh of the fourteen runners behind Bachelor's Double. Shortly after Minoru's disappointing run at Epsom the King died and the ownership of the colt was returned to Colonel Hall-Walker. The King's death resulted in the cancellation of all sporting events, including a meeting at Kempton Park Racecourse, where Minoru had been entered in the Jubilee Stakes. The decision was made not to persevere with the horse and he was retired to stud.

== Assessment ==
When a new racecourse was opened on Lulu Island, Richmond, British Columbia in 1909 it was named "Minoru Park" in honour of the Derby winner. The track was later renamed Brighouse Park and closed in 1941, although the name lives on in playing fields and an ice rink on the site under the name of "Minoru Park".

In their book A Century of Champions, Tony Morris and John Randall rated Minoru an average winner of the 2000 Guineas and an inferior winner of the Derby.

== Stud record ==
Minoru stood as a stallion at Hall-Walker's Tully Stud in County Kildare, Ireland at an initial fee of 98 guineas., Minoru produced the excellent broodmare Serenissima before being sold in 1913 to a breeding operation in Russia. Serenissima's foals included:

- Selene (b. 1919) - outstanding broodmare, dam of Hyperion, Sickle and Pharamond II.
- Tranquil (b. 1920) - won the 1,000 Guineas Stakes and St. Leger Stakes
- Bosworth (b. 1926) - winner of the Ascot Gold Cup

Minoru disappeared during the turmoil of the 1917 Russian Revolution along with his racecourse rival Louviers and the 1913 Derby winner Aboyeur. Although there was speculation that he survived after being smuggled to Serbia, no trace of him was ever actually found.

== Pedigree ==
Pedigree of Minoru (GB), bay stallion, 1906
Sire Cyllene (GB) 1895	Bona Vista; 1889	Bend Or	Doncaster
Sire Cyllene (GB) 1895	Bona Vista; 1889	Bend Or	Rouge Rose
Sire Cyllene (GB) 1895	Bona Vista; 1889	Vista	Macaroni
Sire Cyllene (GB) 1895	Bona Vista; 1889	Vista	Verdure
Sire Cyllene (GB) 1895	Arcadia; 1887	Isonomy	Sterling
Sire Cyllene (GB) 1895	Arcadia; 1887	Isonomy	Isola Bella
Sire Cyllene (GB) 1895	Arcadia; 1887	Distant Shore	Hermit*
Sire Cyllene (GB) 1895	Arcadia; 1887	Distant Shore	Lands End
Dam Mother Siegel (GB) 1897	Friar's Balsam; 1885	Hermit*	Newminster
Dam Mother Siegel (GB) 1897	Friar's Balsam; 1885	Hermit*	Seclusion
Dam Mother Siegel (GB) 1897	Friar's Balsam; 1885	Flower of Dorset	Breadalbane
Dam Mother Siegel (GB) 1897	Friar's Balsam; 1885	Flower of Dorset	Imperatrice
Dam Mother Siegel (GB) 1897	Galopin mare 1887	Galopin	Vedette
Dam Mother Siegel (GB) 1897	Galopin mare 1887	Galopin	Flying Duchess
Dam Mother Siegel (GB) 1897	Galopin mare 1887	Mother Superior	Sterling
Dam Mother Siegel (GB) 1897	Galopin mare 1887	Mother Superior	Chanoinesse (Family: 5-c)

- Minoru was inbred 3x4 to Hermit, meaning that the stallion appears in both the third and fourth generations of his pedigree.
