= Troutbeck (horse) =

British-bred Thoroughbred racehorse

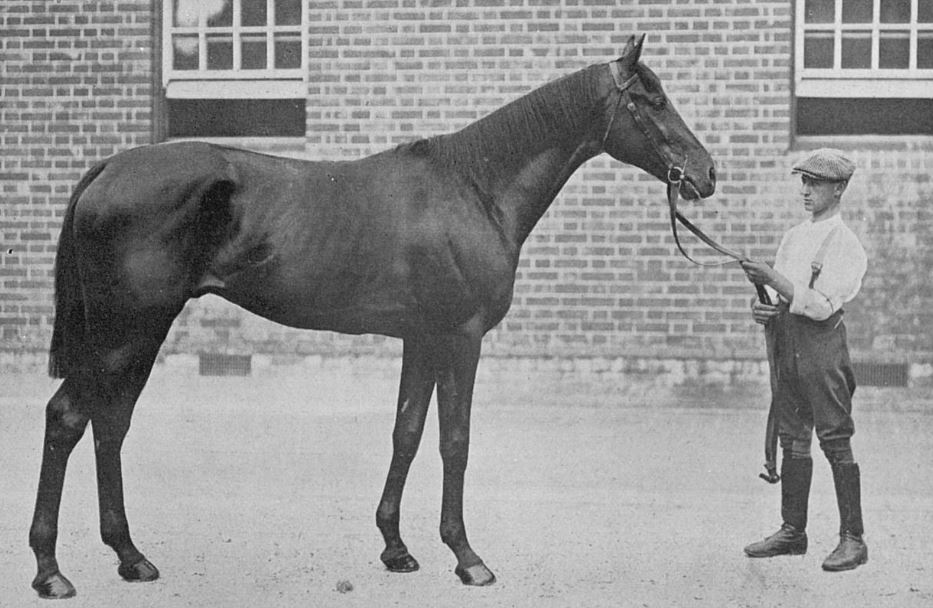
- Troutbeck in 1906.
- Sire: Ladas
- Grandsire: Hampton
- Dam: Rydal Mount
- Damsire: St Serf
- Sex: Stallion
- Foaled: 1903
- Country: United Kingdom of Great Britain and Ireland
- Colour: Bay
- Breeder: Hugh Grosvenor, 2nd Duke of Westminster
- Owner: 2nd Duke of Westminster
- Trainer: William Waugh
- Record: 16: 9-2-1
- Earnings: £11,000

Major wins
- Dee Stakes (1906); Jersey Stakes (1906); Sussex Stakes (1906); St Leger (1906)

Troutbeck (1903–1930) was a British Thoroughbred racehorse and sire. He was beaten in three starts as a juvenile in 1905 but improved to become an exceptional racehorse in the following year. He won his first three races in 1906 before sustaining his only defeat of the season when finishing third in the Epsom Derby. He won his next five races including the Jersey Stakes and the Sussex Stakes before ending the year with a win in the St Leger. He remained in training at four but failed to win any major races although he did finish second in the Coronation Cup. After his retirement from racing he stood as a breeding stallion in Britain and the United States but was not a success at stud.

== Background ==
Troutbeck was a bay horse bred and owned by Hugh Grosvenor, 2nd Duke of Westminster at Eaton Hall in Cheshire. The colt was sent into training with William Waugh at the Kingsclere stable in Berkshire.

Troutbeck was one of the best horses sired by Ladas who won the 2000 Guineas and the Epsom Derby in 1894. His dam Rydal Mount was a daughter of the influential broodmare Rydal whose other descendants have included Molvedo, Niniski, Belmez, Bellypha and Pearl Diver.

== Racing career ==
=== 1905: two-year-old season ===
Troutbeck ran three times as a two-year-old but failed to win or place although he showed somepromise when coming home fourth behind the filly Colonia in the Gimcrack Stakes at York Racecourse in August.

=== 1906: three-year-old season ===
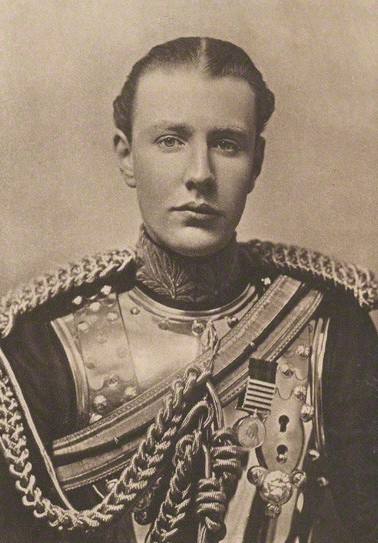
Troutbeck's owner Hugh Grosvenor, 2nd Duke of Westminster

Troutbeck began his second season on 18 April at Newmarket Racecourse and recorded his first success by taking the 47th Newmarket Biennial Stakes. At Chester Racecourse in May the colt maintained his progress, winning two races including the Dee Stakes. On 30 May Troutbeck was one of twenty-two runners to contest the Epsom Derby over 1 1/2 miles and started a 33/1 outsider. After disputing the lead from the start he went to the front in the straight but was outpaced in the closing stages and finished third behind Spearmint and Picton, beaten three and a half lengths by the winner. Shortly after winning the Duchess of York Plate at Hurst Park in June Troutbeck was dropped back in distance for the seven furlong Jersey Stakes Royal Ascot in which he was ridden by Herbert Jones and won at odds of 4/7. Less than a week later he won the Sandringham Plate at Sandown Park to record his third victory in the space of ten days. In August the colt won for the seventh time as he took the Sussex Stakes at Goodwood Racecourse at odds of 1/4, with Jones again in the saddle and then recorded yet another success in the City of London Breeders' Foal Plate at Kempton.

On 12 September at Doncaster Racecourse Troutbeck, ridden by the French jockey Georges Stern, started at 5/1 for the 131st running of the St Leger over 14 1/2 furlongs. The filly Keystone II started the 5/4 favourite while the other runners included Gorgos, Plum Tree (Goodwood Cup), Beppo and th French colt Storm (third in the Grand Prix de Paris). The start of the race was very untidy and saw several horses left behind but Troutbeck responded quickly, went to the front, and opened up a clear advantage over his rivals. Troubeck still held the lead entering the straight but Beppo and Keystone were now close behind and the unconsidered outsider Prince William began tomake rapid progress along the inside rail. The closing stages saw a "desperate struggle" with Troutbeck prevailing by a head from Prince William, with Beppo and Keystone a head and a neck away in third and fourth. The finish of the race was extremely rough, with much bumping and barging between the first four horses, leading one observer to remark that it resembled "a combination of skittles and polo". Stern became the first French jockey to win one of the British Classic Races, while the winning time of 3:04.2 was a new record for the race.

=== 1907: four-year-old season ===
Troutbeck remained in training as a four-year-old in 1907. In the Coronation Cup at Epsom in June he finished second to The White Knight with Polymelus in third. He faced The White Knight again in the Ascot Gold Cup over 2 1/2 miles but finished unplaced. In July at Lingfield he was beaten by the three-year-old Wool Winder in a two-horse race for the valuable Lingfield Park Plate, conceding 24 pounds to the winner. He was retired from racing shortly afterwards.

== Assessment and honours ==
In their book, A Century of Champions, based on the Timeform rating system, John Randall and Tony Morris rated Troutbeck an "inferior" winner of the St Leger.

== Stud record ==
Troutbeck began his stud career in England at an initial advertised fee of £49. After standing for several years in England he was sold for 460 guineas in 1917 and was exported to the United States in January 1920. He had little success as a sire of winner in either location. Troutbeck died in 1930.

== Pedigree ==
Pedigree of Troutbeck (GB), bay stallion, 1903
Sire Ladas (GB) 1891	Hampton (GB); 1872	Lord Clifden	Newminster
Sire Ladas (GB) 1891	Hampton (GB); 1872	Lord Clifden	The Slave
Sire Ladas (GB) 1891	Hampton (GB); 1872	Lady Langden	Kettledrum
Sire Ladas (GB) 1891	Hampton (GB); 1872	Lady Langden	Haricot
Sire Ladas (GB) 1891	Illuminata (GB); 1877	Rosicrucian	Beadsman
Sire Ladas (GB) 1891	Illuminata (GB); 1877	Rosicrucian	Madame Eglentine
Sire Ladas (GB) 1891	Illuminata (GB); 1877	Paraffin	Blair Athol
Sire Ladas (GB) 1891	Illuminata (GB); 1877	Paraffin	Paradigm
Dam Rydal Mount (GB) 1898	St Serf (GB); 1887	St Simon	Galopin
Dam Rydal Mount (GB) 1898	St Serf (GB); 1887	St Simon	St Angela
Dam Rydal Mount (GB) 1898	St Serf (GB); 1887	Feronia	Thormanby*
Dam Rydal Mount (GB) 1898	St Serf (GB); 1887	Feronia	Woodbine
Dam Rydal Mount (GB) 1898	Rydal (GB); 1886	Bend Or	Doncaster
Dam Rydal Mount (GB) 1898	Rydal (GB); 1886	Bend Or	Rouge Rose*
Dam Rydal Mount (GB) 1898	Rydal (GB); 1886	Windermere	Macaroni
Dam Rydal Mount (GB) 1898	Rydal (GB); 1886	Windermere	Miss Agnes (Family 16-b)

* Troutbeck is inbred 4D x 5D to the stallion Thormanby, meaning that he appears fourth generation and fifth generation (via Rouge Rose) on the dam side of his pedigree.
