= Hampton (horse) =

British-bred Thoroughbred racehorse

- Sire: Lord Clifden
- Grandsire: Newminster
- Dam: Lady Langden
- Damsire: Kettledrum
- Sex: Stallion
- Foaled: 1872
- Country: Great Britain
- Colour: Bay
- Breeder: Lord Norreys
- Owner: 1) Lord Norreys; 2) James Nightengall; 3) Francis Egerton
- Trainer: 1) not found 2) Mr. Harvey; 3) Robert Peck
- Record: 33: 19-?-?
- Earnings: £not found

Major wins
- South-Western Stakes (1874); Great Metropolitan Stakes (1875); Northumberland Plate (1877); Goodwood Cup (1877); Doncaster Cup (1877); Kelso Gold Cup (1877); Caledonian Centenary Cup (1877); Queen's Plate (1877); Epsom Gold Cup (1878)

Awards
- Leading sire in Great Britain and Ireland (1887); Leading broodmare sire in Great Britain & Ireland (1900)
- Last updated on June 5, 2010

Hampton (1872–1897) was a British Thoroughbred racehorse and Champion sire. Bred by Lord Norreys, he was sired by 1863 St. Leger Stakes winner, Lord Clifden. His dam was Lady Langden whose sire, Kettledrum, won the 1861 Epsom Derby.

Hampton won races from a sprint distance all the way to those at more than two and a half miles.

At stud, Hampton proved a highly successful sire, earning Champion sire honors in 1887 and Champion broodmare sire honors in 1900. Among his successful runners were four winners of British Classic Races:

- Merry Hampton - 1887 Epsom Derby
- Reve d'Or - 1887 1,000 Guineas Stakes
- Ayrshire - 1888 Epsom Derby
- Ladas - 1894 Epsom Derby and 2,000 Guineas Stakes

== Sire line tree ==
Descendants of Hampton (click to show)
- Hampton
  - Ladislas
  - Duke Of Richmond
  - Royal Hampton
    - Marcion
    - Styrax
    - Kirkconnel
      - Baron Kiki
    - Royal Emblem
      - Sacandaga
    - Forfarshire
      - Copper Ore
        - Red Splash
    - Royal Lancer
  - Eothen
    - Ethelbert
      - Colonel Holloway
  - Grandison
  - Merry Hampton
    - Pride
  - Apollo
  - Ayrshire
    - Ayr Laddie
    - Symington
      - Junior
        - Arminio
    - Kilkerrin
      - Expectation
    - Heir Male
    - Bowling Brook
    - Solitaire
    - Cossack
    - Doctrine
    - Robert Le Diable
      - Wrack
        - Blazes
        - Little Chief
        - Petee Wrack
    - Airlie
      - Martial
        - Cri de Guerre
    - Airship
    - Festino
      - Festtarok
      - Orelio
      - Antinous
      - Amorino
      - Pergolese
        - Augias
    - Traquair
      - Woorak
        - Accarak
        - Prince Woorak
        - Salrak
        - Soorak
        - Sir Andrew
        - Whittier
        - Yanda
        - Sandringham
        - Rakwool
  - Sheen
    - Batt
  - Gay Hampton
  - Lord Lorne
  - Fitz Hampton
  - Balmoral
  - Bushey Park
  - Phocion
  - Cheery Tree
  - Ladas
    - Epsom Lad
    - Gorgos
      - Gorgorito
      - Listman
      - Bridaine
      - Sourbier
    - Troutbeck
  - Speed
    - Velocity
  - Walmsgate
    - Jerry M
  - Star Ruby
    - Sombrero
    - Rubio
    - Africander
      - Dreadnought
    - Cairngorm
  - Troon
  - Bay Ronald
    - Wild Oats
    - MacDonald
      - As d'Atout
      - Oreg Lak
      - McKinley
    - Dark Ronald
      - Ambassador
        - St James
      - Son-in-Law
        - The Winter King
        - D'Orsay
        - Apron
        - Knight Of The Garter
        - Winalot
        - Foxlaw
        - Comedy King
        - Diadochos
        - Walinson
        - Ronsard
        - Son And Heir
        - Constant Son
        - Siegfried
        - Tourist
        - Empire Builder
        - Trimdon
        - Bosworth
        - Beau Pere
        - Parenthesis
        - Rustom Pasha
        - Within-The-Law
        - Young Lover
        - Epigram
        - Valerian
      - Brown Prince
        - Brown Bud
      - Dark Legend
        - Dark Japan
        - Dark Lantern
        - Duplex
        - Easton
        - Legend Of France
      - Magpie
        - Graculus
        - Boaster
        - Windbag
        - Amounis
        - Bacchus
        - Nawallah
        - Bicolor
        - Corinax
        - Inducement
        - Karuma
        - Goshawk
        - Jacko
        - Fakenham
        - Talking
      - Prunus
        - Mah Jong
        - Oleander
        - Palastpage
        - Orgelton
      - Herold
        - Lupus
        - Dionys
        - Alchimist
        - Arjaman
      - Wallenstein
        - Alba
        - Wehr Dich
      - Axenstein
      - Traumer
      - Aditi
    - Bayardo
      - Gay Crusader
        - Bright Knight
        - Hurstwood
        - Caissot
        - Gay Lothario
        - Hot Night
        - Kincardine
        - Inglesant
        - Medieval Knight
      - Gainsborough
        - Murillo
        - Solario
        - Tournesol
        - Artist Glow
        - Sir Nigel
        - Artist's Proof
        - Costaki Pasha
        - Le Voleur
        - Lansdowne
        - Ramses II
        - Singapore
        - Goyescas
        - Orwell
        - Hyperion
        - Bobsleigh
        - Emborough
        - Artist's Son
        - Winterhalter
      - Lord Basil
      - Manilardo
      - Allenby
      - Manton
        - Fagas
        - Harpagon
        - Wagram
      - The Ace
    - Fidia
    - Combourg
