= Clarence J. A. Turner =

American jockey (1893–1957)

Clarence Turner
- Clarence Turner, c. 1912

Personal information
- Born: November 25, 1893 Plowhandle Point, Indiana, U.S.
- Died: April 12, 1957 (aged 63)
- Occupation: Jockey

Horse racing career
- Sport: Horse racing

Major racing wins
- Coronation Futurity Stakes (1912); Toronto Cup Handicap (1912, 1913); King Edward Gold Cup (1913); Windsor Hotel Cup Handicap (1913, 1922); Woodstock Stakes (1913); Great American Stakes (1914, 1924); Jerome Handicap (1914); Manhattan Handicap (1914); Potomac Handicap (1915, 1920); Metropolitan Handicap (1915); Suburban Handicap (1915); Empire City Handicap (1920); Fleetwing Handicap (1920, 1923); Chesapeake Stakes (1921); Mount Vernon Handicap (1921); Connaught Cup Stakes (1922); Hamilton Derby (1922); Seagram Cup Handicap (1922); Carter Handicap (1923); Juvenile Stakes (1923); Laurel Futurity (1925); Sanford Stakes (1925); Pimlico Futurity Stakes (1925); Brooklyn Handicap (1926); Delaware Handicap (1926); American Classic Race wins: Preakness Stakes (1912)

Significant horses
- Colonel Holloway, Single Foot, Stromboli
- Updated on July 27, 2008

Clarence Jesse Arthur Turner (November 25, 1893 – April 12, 1957) was an American jockey in Thoroughbred horse racing.

== Biography ==
He was born in rural Indiana on November 25, 1893. Clarence Turner began his riding career in his teens. He competed at tracks on the American east coast but when racing shut down in New York State during 1911 and 1912 as a result of a legislated ban on parimutuel betting, he rode at Havana, Cuba's Oriental Park Racetrack and at Old Woodbine Race Course in Toronto, Canada. While competing in Canada he rode for major stable owners such as Harry Giddings Sr. and Commander J. K. L. Ross.

In the early 1920s, Clarence Turner was a contract rider for Joseph E. Widener and a few years later rode Stromboli to several of his important wins for owner August Belmont Jr. In the pre-Triple Crown era, Turner had three mounts in the Kentucky Derby with his best result a third-place finish in 1925 aboard Son of John. He had six rides in the Preakness Stakes, winning the 1912 edition with Frank J. Nolan's Colonel Holloway. The following year he almost won his second straight Preakness when he finished second by a neck to winner, Buskin.

During his career, Turner had six wins on a single racecard, a record for that era shared with racing greats, Earl Sande and Alfred Robertson.

Clarence Turner died on April 12, 1957, in Miami, Florida.
