= Bayardo (horse) =

British-bred Thoroughbred racehorse

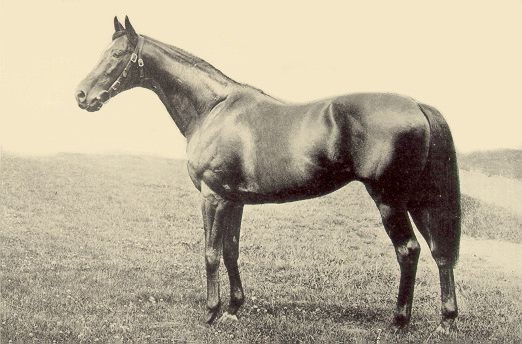
- Sire: Bay Ronald
- Grandsire: Hampton
- Dam: Galicia
- Damsire: Galopin
- Sex: Stallion
- Foaled: 1906
- Died: 1917 (aged 10–11)
- Country: Great Britain
- Colour: Bay
- Breeder: Alfred W Cox (Mr Fairie)
- Owner: Alfred W Cox (Mr Fairie)
- Trainer: Alec Taylor Jr.
- Record: 25: 22–1–0
- Earnings: £44,535

Major wins
- New Stakes (1908); Richmond Stakes (1908); Middle Park Plate (1908); Dewhurst Plate (1908); Prince of Wales's Stakes (1909); Eclipse Stakes (1909); St. Leger Stakes (1909); Champion Stakes (1909); Chester Vase (1910); Ascot Gold Cup (1910)

Awards
- Leading British money winner (1909); Leading sire in Great Britain and Ireland (1917 & 1918); Leading broodmare sire in Britain & Ireland (1925)

Bayardo (1906–1917) was a British bred Thoroughbred racehorse with an impressive record, both on the racecourse and at stud, where he was a leading sire.

== Background ==
He was sired by Bay Ronald who won the Hardwicke Stakes and the City and Suburban Handicap. Bay Ronald sired Rondeau, who won nine stakes races, and was the dam of the influential stallion Teddy. He also sired Macdonald II, winner of the Prix Royal-Oak in France, and Dark Ronald, sire of Son-in-Law and Vaucluse, winner of the 1,000 Guineas Stakes.

Bayardo's dam, Galicia, came from a good family which included having Blink Bonnie, as her fifth dam. Galicia was by Galopin—a Derby winner and sire St. Simon—and out of the Isonomy mare, Isoletta. She won the Biennial Stakes as a two-year-old, before injuring her pastern. Galicia raced as a three-year-old, but broke down in the Derby Cup and was retired for breeding. She produced four winners, of 42 races and £88,000, including Lemberg, who won the Dewhurst Stakes, Middle Park Stakes, The Derby, Eclipse Stakes, St. James's Palace Stakes, Jockey Club Stakes, and the Coronation Cup, finished second in the 2,000 Guineas, and third in the St. Leger Stakes. Bayardo was inbred to Galopin in the second and fourth generations (2×4) and to Sterling in the fourth generation (4×4).

== Racing career ==
=== Two-year-old ===
As a two-year-old, Cox sent Bayardo to trainer Alec Taylor's stud farm and training centre in Manton, Wiltshire. Run in a trial, Bayardo showed his talent early by defeating several other two-year-olds and a three-year-old. He was then sent to his first race, the New Stakes at the Royal Ascot, which he won easily under jockey Bernard Dillon. He continued his winning streak throughout his two-year-old season, usually ridden by Danny Maher, including the National Breeders' Produce Stakes, the Richmond Stakes, the Buckenham Stakes, the Rous Memorial Stakes, the Middle Park Plate, and the Dewhurst Plate (beating the filly Perola, who won The Oaks the following year).

=== Three-year-old ===
Bayardo faced setbacks the following season, due to a harsh winter that decreased training time and an accident on frosty ground which left him temporarily lame. Cox went against the wishes of his trainer and decided to run his colt in the 2,000 Guineas. Bayardo finished fourth, losing to the colt Minoru. Following this race, Bayardo steadily improved, and was entered in the Epsom Derby. But problems arose again, this time when the favourite, Sir Martin, stumbled badly in close quarters and lost his rider and hampered part of the field, causing enough of a setback that Bayardo finished fifth, again losing to Minoru.

Bayardo continued his three-year-old season in great style, winning every race in which he started, resulting in 11 consecutive victories. This included the Prince of Wales's Stakes, the Sandringham Foal Stakes, and the Eclipse Stakes. In the latter race, he easily won by two lengths, beating several talented animals including Royal Realm (winner of the Dullingham Plate), Santo Strato (winner of the Chester Cup), and Your Majesty (winner of the Eclipse Stakes and the St. Leger the year before). He then won the 1.25 mile York Plate, before entering in the St. Leger Stakes.

Going into the St. Leger, Bayardo was favoured over Minoru, the colt who had defeated him in both the Derby and the Two Thousand Guineas. Bayardo went on to win the third classic race without trouble, and then ran only two days later in the Doncaster Stakes, again for a win. The rest of his three-year-old season continued with victories, including the Champion Stakes, the Lowther Stakes, and the Limekiln Stakes, then the Sandown Park Foal Stakes the Liverpool St. Leger.

=== Four-year-old ===
Bayardo's four-year-old season was aimed at the Ascot Gold Cup. His two preparatory races, the Biennial Stakes at Newmarket and the Chester Vase at Chester, were both victories (although just barely in latter, as he won by a head). In the Gold Cup, Bayardo faced the Prix du Jockey Club winner Sea Sick II. Sea Sick II was in the lead for some time, while Bayardo was held back in the field according to the race tactic of jockey Maher. With six furlongs to go, Bayardo decided he would rather take the lead and ran off with his jockey, past his French opponent, to win by four lengths. This race is often regarded as the greatest of his career.

Bayardo continued his four-year-old season with a win in the Dullingham Plate, his fifteenth in succession since losing the Derby the year before. In his final race of the season, the Goodwood Cup Bayardo was still thought to be the favourite despite the fact that he carried 36 pounds more than the three-year-old colt Magic. Maher allowed Magic to set the pace, holding Bayardo back. But he allowed too much distance to grow between his horse and the other colt, so that when he finally gave Bayardo his head, he was unable to make it up before the finish, losing his sixteenth straight victory by only a neck. Magic never went on to win any other major race.

=== Racing record ===
- 1908 (age 2): 7 wins out of 7 starts, £13,040 won
- 1909 (age 3): 11 wins out of 13 starts, unplaced in two races, won £24,797
- 1910 (age 4): 4 wins out of 5 starts, second in one race, won £6,698

During his career, Bayardo started in 25 races, winning 22, finishing second in another and was only unplaced twice. His career earnings amounted to £44,535. Bayardo's race distances ranged from five furlongs to two and a half miles, showing not only his great speed, but also his versatility.

== Stud record ==
With his very impressive record on the turf, Bayardo was instantly popular as a sire. Standing at his trainer's Manton Stud, his stud fee soon rose to 300 guineas. Bayardo was Champion Sire in 1917 and 1918, and leading broodmare sire in 1925. He produced three classic winners, two of which went on to win the English Triple Crown. However, his excellent breeding career was cut short after he contracted thrombosis at the age of eleven, paralysed his hind legs and resulting in his death on 4 June 1917.

His progeny included:

- Allenby: second in the 2,000 Guineas
- Bayuda: Bayardo filly, winner of the Oaks
- Gainsborough: winner of the 1918 English Triple Crown, sire of four classic winners. His progeny included Hyperion, winner of the Epsom Derby and the St. Leger and champion sire six years in succession, and Solario, winner of the St. Leger and Ascot Gold Cup.
- Gay Crusader: winner of the 1917 English Triple Crown and £11,246.
- Good and Gay: dam of stakes winning Saucy Sue (stakes winner of £25,284).
- Manilardo: winner of the Coronation Cup;
- Manton: third in the St. Leger, later one of the top three leading sires in Poland during the 1920s and champion sire in 1930.
- Mapledurham: third (both to Bayuda) in the Cheveley Park Stakes and in the Oaks
- Pompadour: third in the 1,000 Guineas.

Other descendants include:

- Saucy Sue: granddaughter of Bayardo, and put him on the top of the "sire of broodmares" list. She won the 1,000 Guineas, the Oaks, and the Coronation Stakes; third in the Park Hill Stakes.
- Hyperion provided the main branch of Bayardo descendants. Hyperion's progeny included Alibhai, Aristophanes, Aureole, Gulf Stream, Heliopolis, Helios, Hornbeam, Khaled, Owen Tudor, Ruthless and Aldis Lamp.

== Sire line tree ==
Descendants of Bayardo (click to show)
- Bayardo
  - Gay Crusader
    - Bright Knight
      - Gallant Knight
    - Hurstwood
    - Caissot
      - Intermezzo
        - Imi
    - Gay Lothario
    - Hot Night
    - Kincardine
      - Kindergarten
    - Inglesant
    - Medieval Knight
  - Lord Basil
  - Manilardo
  - Allenby
  - Manton
    - Fagas
    - Harpagon
    - Wagram
  - The Ace
  - Gainsborough
    - Murillo
    - Solario
      - Dastur
        - Dhoti
        - Gold Nib
        - Umiddad
        - Darbhanga
        - Princes Game
      - Tai-Yang
      - Raeburn
      - Sind
        - Pierot
      - Mid-day Sun
        - Alonzo
        - Sterope
      - Foroughi
      - Sadri
      - King's Approach
        - Royal Approach
      - Nicolaus
        - Nicolaus Silver
      - Shapoor
        - Battle Burn
      - Straight Deal
        - Aldborough
        - Royal Highway
        - Honour Bound
    - Tournesol
      - Isao
      - Wakataka
      - Osis
      - Tsukitoki
      - Tsukiyasu
      - Dynamo
      - Iwa Kabuto
      - Tokumasa
      - Adzuma Dake
      - Kyokujitsu
      - Kumohata
        - Katsufuji
        - New Ford
        - Hatakaze
        - Mitsuhata
        - Kiyo Strong
        - Koran
        - Yoshi Minori
        - Hiya Kiogan
        - Meiji Honore
        - Meiji Hikari
        - Kanehata
        - Toshiwaka
        - Hataryu
      - Tokino Chikara
        - Clack Soul
        - Captain O
        - Tokidenko
        - Ken Chikara
      - Ieryu
      - Kuretake
        - Sachifusa
      - Kuri Yamato
    - Artist Glow
    - Sir Nigel
      - Sirlan
        - Bouzoulou
        - Vulgan
      - Sir Fellah
        - Sidere
    - Artist's Proof
      - Fine Art
        - Fine Top
    - Costaki Pasha
    - Le Voleur
    - Lansdowne
      - Land's Corner
    - Ramses II
      - Red Rower
    - Singapore
      - Chulmleigh
        - Whiteway
      - Skoiter
        - Sunsalve
      - Arco
        - Scanno
        - Scai
    - Goyescas
    - Orwell
      - Rosewell
        - Distel
        - Linwell
    - Bobsleigh
      - Oxo
    - Emborough
      - Bernborough
        - Bernwood
        - Brush Burn
        - High Scud
        - Berseem
        - First Aid
        - Hook Money
        - Larrikin
        - Resolved
        - Piano Jim
        - Catapult
    - Artist's Son
      - Durlas Eile
    - Winterhalter
    - Hyperion
      - Half Crown
        - Haffaday
      - Admiral's Walk
      - Casanova
        - Golden Surprise
      - Heliopolis
        - Marine Victory
        - Ace Admiral
        - Olympia
        - Greek Ship
        - Greek Song
        - Charlie McAdam
        - Helioscope
        - High Gun
        - Summer Tan
        - Rose Trellis
        - Grey Eagle
        - Globemaster
      - His Highness
        - Perhapsburg
      - Hypnotist
      - Quick Ray
      - Helios
        - Wodalla
      - Hippius
      - Stardust
        - Stalino
        - Bright News
        - Star Kingdom
        - Gala Performance
      - Alibhai
        - Cover Up
        - On Trust
        - Solidarity
        - Your Host
        - My Host
        - Chevation
        - Determine
        - Bardstown
        - Honeys Alibi
        - Traffic Judge
        - Sharpsburg
        - Oligarchy
        - Mr Consistency
      - Devonian
        - Herring Gull
      - Orthodox
      - Owen Tudor
        - Tudor Minstrel
        - Abernant
        - Eplenor
        - Tudor Era
        - Right Royal
      - Selim Hassan
        - Cid
        - Chispeado
        - Yatasto
      - Sol Oriens
      - Sun Castle
      - Hyacinthus
      - Hyperides
      - Sun King
        - Sundew
      - Deimos
      - Coastal Traffic
        - Buisson d'Or
      - Pensive
        - Ponder
        - Theory
        - Cyclotron
      - Red Mars
      - Rockafella
        - Rockavon
      - Ruthless
      - Greek Star
        - Anglo
      - High Peak
      - Aldis Lamp
      - Gulf Stream
        - Manganga
        - Gulf Weed
        - Pipote
        - Anisado
        - Manantial
        - Mamboreta
        - Montparnasse
        - Riesgo
      - Khaled
        - Dulac
        - Big Noise
        - Correspondent
        - El Drag
        - Hillary
        - Swaps
        - Terrang
        - California Kid
        - Khalex
        - Linmold
        - New Policy
        - Physician
        - Going Abroad
        - Corn Off The Cob
      - Radiotherapy
      - Sky High
        - Pas de Quatre
      - Empyrean
      - Hyperbole
      - Babu's Pet
      - Rolled Gold
      - Aristophanes
        - Atlas
        - Booz
        - Forli
        - Dorileo
        - Frari
      - Hylander
      - Judicate
      - Aureole
        - St Crespin
        - St Paddy
        - Vienna
        - Aurelius
        - Miralgo
        - Silver Cloud
        - Provoke
        - Hermes
      - Gun Shot
        - Gun Bow
      - High Veldt
      - Hornbeam
        - Claude
        - Intermezzo
      - Ommeyad
      - High Hat
        - High Line
      - Zenith

== Pedigree ==
Pedigree of Bayardo (10) B. h. 1906
Sire Bay Ronald B. 1893	Hampton; B. 1872	Lord Clifden; B. 1860	Newminster
Sire Bay Ronald B. 1893	Hampton; B. 1872	Lord Clifden; B. 1860	The Slave
Sire Bay Ronald B. 1893	Hampton; B. 1872	Lady Langden; Br. 1868	Kettledrum
Sire Bay Ronald B. 1893	Hampton; B. 1872	Lady Langden; Br. 1868	Haricot
Sire Bay Ronald B. 1893	Black Duchess; Br. 1886	Galliard; Br. 1880	Galopin*
Sire Bay Ronald B. 1893	Black Duchess; Br. 1886	Galliard; Br. 1880	Mavis
Sire Bay Ronald B. 1893	Black Duchess; Br. 1886	Black Corrie; Blk. 1879	Sterling*
Sire Bay Ronald B. 1893	Black Duchess; Br. 1886	Black Corrie; Blk. 1879	Mare by Wild Dayrell
Dam Galicia Br. 1898	Galopin*; Br. 1872	Vedette*; Br. 1854	Voltigeur*
Dam Galicia Br. 1898	Galopin*; Br. 1872	Vedette*; Br. 1854	Mrs Ridgway*
Dam Galicia Br. 1898	Galopin*; Br. 1872	Flying Duchess*; Br. 1853	The Flying Dutchman*
Dam Galicia Br. 1898	Galopin*; Br. 1872	Flying Duchess*; Br. 1853	Merope*
Dam Galicia Br. 1898	Isoletta; B. 1891	Isonomy; Br. 1875	Sterling*
Dam Galicia Br. 1898	Isoletta; B. 1891	Isonomy; Br. 1875	Isola Bella
Dam Galicia Br. 1898	Isoletta; B. 1891	Lady Muncaster; Ch. 1884	Muncaster
Dam Galicia Br. 1898	Isoletta; B. 1891	Lady Muncaster; Ch. 1884	Blue Light

* Bayardo is inbred 4S x 2D to the stallion Galopin, meaning that he appears fourth generation on the sire side of his pedigree, and second generation on the dam side of his pedigree.

* Bayardo is inbred 4S x 4D to the stallion Sterling, meaning that he appears fourth generation on the sire side of his pedigree, and fourth generation on the dam side of his pedigree.

== See also ==
- List of leading Thoroughbred racehorses
