= Rubio (horse) =

American-bred Thoroughbred racehorse

- Sire: Star Ruby
- Grandsire: Hampton
- Dam: La Touera
- Damsire: Sir Modred
- Sex: Gelding
- Foaled: 1898
- Country: United States
- Colour: Chestnut
- Breeder: Rancho del Paso Stud
- Owner: Frank Douglas-Pennant
- Trainer: William Costello

Major wins
- Grand National (1908)

Rubio was an American thoroughbred racehorse best remembered as the winner of the 1908 Grand National steeplechase run at Aintree, England.

The horse was bred in Rancho del Paso stud in California in 1898 by La Toquera and Star Ruby from the damsire Sir Modred by breeder James Ben Ali Haggin. Rubio was sent to the United Kingdom as a yearling, having been purchased for 15 guineas.

As a five-year-old, the horse had broken down so severely that he was put to pulling a trolley bus in Towcester to regain the strength in his legs. The regime worked, and after two years he was put back into training.

At the 1908 Grand National, Rubio was relatively unconsidered and was sent off at 66/1, ridden by Henry Bletsoe, the son of the horse's former trainer Bernard Bletsoe. Rubio defeated his better-fancied stable companion, Mattie McGregor, by 10 lengths for trainer William Costello.

== Defence ==
Rubio returned in 1909, falling at the water jump. When he returned to the stables, he was found to have again broken down and was promptly retired from racing.
