= 1910 Grand National =

English steeplechase horse race

- Grand National
- Location: Aintree
- Date: 18 March 1910
- Winning horse: Jenkinstown
- Starting price: 100/8
- Jockey: Bob Chadwick
- Trainer: Tom Coulthwaite
- Owner: Stanley Howard
- Conditions: Good to soft

The 1910 Grand National was the 72nd official annual running of the Grand National horse race that took place at Aintree Racecourse near Liverpool, England, on 18 March 1910.

It is the earliest Grand National of which there are moving images.

== Finishing Order ==
Position	Name	Jockey	Age	Handicap (st-lb)	SP	Distance
01	Jenkinstown	Bob Chadwick	9	10-5	100/8	3 lengths
02	Jerry M	Edmund Driscoll	7	12-7	6/1	3 Lengths
03	Odor	Mr R Hall	?	9-7	100/1	
04	Carsey	G R Morgan	?	10-7	100/8	
05	Fetlar's Pride	John Walsh jnr	?	10-11	100/7	Last to complete

== Non-finishers ==
Fence	Name	Jockey	Age	Handicap (st-lb)	SP	Fate
?	Caubeen	Frank Mason	?	11-8	8/1	Fell
?	Bloodstone	Spink Walkington	?	11-8	100/7	Fell
?	Springbok	William Payne	?	11-5	25/1	Pulled UP
?	Judas	Algernon Anthony	?	11-5	13/2	Fell
?	Rathvale	Richard Morgan	?	11-1	66/1	Fell
?	Lord Chatham	Joe Dillon	?	10-12	100/1	Fell
?	Albuera	Frank Lyall	?	10-12	100/7	Fell
?	Wickham	Walter Bulteel	?	10-11	66/1	Fell
?	Paddy Maher	Mr R H Walker	?	10-9	33/1	Fell
?	Shady Girl	G Clancy	?	10-8	33/1	Fell
?	Precentor II	W Rollason	?	10-7	100/1	Pulled Up
?	Glenside	R Goswell	?	10-4	25/1	Fell
?	Brineoge	Mr F A Brown	?	10-4	100/1	Refused
?	General Fox	T Wilmot	6	10-12	66/1	Fell
?	Phaeton	F Morgan	?	10-0	100/1	Knocked Over
?	Hercules II	Charles Hawkins	?	9-9	100/1	Fell
?	The Lurcher	F Dainly	?	9-9	100/6	Fell
?	Captain Farrell	G Brown	6	9-7	100/1	Refused
?	Logan Rock	H Jackson	?	9-7	20/1	Knocked Over
?	Bushido	J Hetherington	5	9-7	66/1	Knocked Over
