= 1912 Grand National =

Horse race held in 1912

- Grand National
- Location: Aintree
- Date: 29 March 1912
- Winning horse: Jerry M
- Starting price: 4/1 JF
- Jockey: Ernie Piggott
- Trainer: Robert Gore
- Owner: Sir Charles Assheton-Smith
- Conditions: Soft

The 1912 Grand National was the 74th renewal of the Grand National horse race that took place at Aintree Racecourse near Liverpool, England, on 27 March 1912.

Owner Sir Charles Assheton-Smith would provide the winner again in 1913. He also owned the 1893 winner, when he was known simply as Charles Duff.

== Finishing Order ==
| Position | Name | Jockey | Age | Handicap (st-lb) | SP | Distance |
|---|---|---|---|---|---|---|
| 01 | Jerry M | Ernest Piggott | 9 | 12-7 | 4/1 | 6 Lengths |
| 02 | Bloodstone | Frank Lyall | 10 | 11-6 | 40/1 | ? |
| 03 | Axle Pin | Ivor Anthony | 8 | 10-2 | 20/1 | ? |
| 04 | Carsey | Jack Tyrrwhitt-Drake | 9 | 10-13 | 100/8 | ? |
| 05 | Mount Prospect's Fortune | John Kelly | 10 | 11-4 | ? | ? |
| 06 | Sir Halbert | Arthur Smith | 9 | 10-6 | ? | ? |
| 07 | Whiteleg's II | J Farrell | 8 | 10-12 | ? | Last to complete |

== Non-finishers ==
| Fence | Name | Jockey | Age | Handicap (st-lb) | SP | Fate |
|---|---|---|---|---|---|---|
| ? | Rathnally | Robert Chadwick | 7 | 11-11 | 4/1 | Fell |
| ? | Rory O'Moore | Frank Mason | 11 | 11-7 | 9/1 | ? |
| ? | Jenkinstown | William Payne | 11 | 11-7 | 100/7 | ? |
| ? | Caubeen | Alfred Newey | 11 | 11-5 | 100/9 | ? |
| ? | Glenside | Harry Ussher | 10 | 11-0 | 40/1 | Fell |
| ? | Ballyhackle | L Morgan | 9 | 10-7 | 20/1 | ? |
| ? | Kilkeel | Robert Trudgill | 7 | 10-7 | ? | ? |
| ? | Fetlar's Pride | George Lyall | 11 | 10-7 | ? | ? |
| ? | Regent | Frank Morgan | 7 | 10-6 | ? | ? |
| ? | Bridge IV | Mr G Poole | 8 | 10-6 | 25/1 | ? |
| ? | Covertcoat | John Walsh jnr | 6 | 10-5 | 33/1 | ? |
| ? | Great Cross | E Lawn | 7 | 10-1 | 40/1 | ? |
| ? | Precentor II | A Aylin | 13 | 10-0 | ? | ? |
| ? | Gold Seal II | J Finn | 12 | 10-0 | ? | ? |
| ? | Sans Peur | J Kay | 13 | 10-0 | ? | ? |
| ? | Foolhardy | William MacNeill | 11 | 10-0 | ? | ? |
| ? | Glenfinder | J Foran | 11 | 10-0 | ? | ? |
