= Short Story (horse) =

British-bred Thoroughbred racehorse

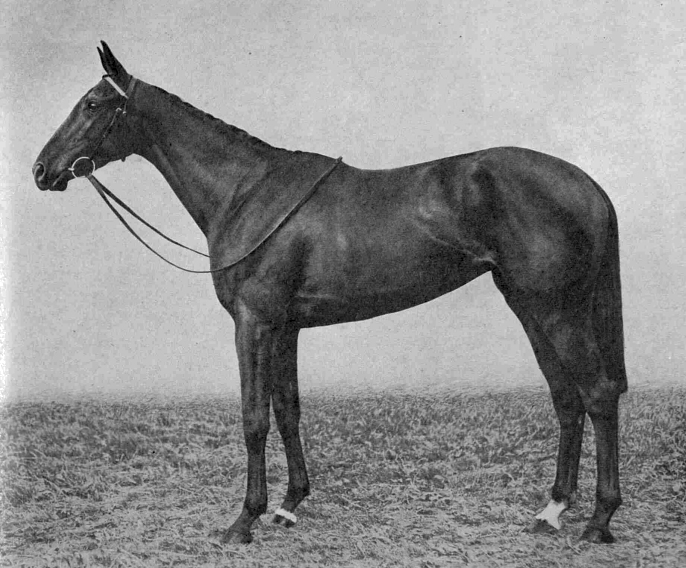
- Short Story in 1926.
- Sire: Buchan
- Grandsire: Sunstar
- Dam: Long Suit
- Damsire: Lemberg
- Sex: Mare
- Foaled: 1923
- Country: United Kingdom
- Colour: Bay
- Breeder: Waldorf Astor, 2nd Viscount Astor
- Owner: Lord Astor
- Trainer: Alec Taylor, Jr.
- Record: 7: 2-2-3

Major wins
- Epsom Oaks (1926)

Short Story (1923 – 1939) was a British Thoroughbred racehorse and broodmare. After showing considerable promise as a two-year-old, Short Story finished third in the 1000 Guineas in the following spring and then won the Epsom Oaks by four lengths. She never won again but was placed in the Nassau Stakes, Yorkshire Oaks and Park Hill Stakes. As a broodmare she produced one good racehorse, but otherwise made little impact as a dam of winners.

The stable lad that took care of Short Story and rode her on work mornings was Ernest Sparrowhawk.

Sir Alfred Munnings painted Short Story together with Alec Taylor and Ernest Sparrowhawk. The painting is in the National gallery.

== Background ==
Short Story was a bay mare bred in the United Kingdom by her owner Waldorf Astor, 2nd Viscount Astor. She was sent into training with Alec Taylor, Jr. at his stable at Manton, Wiltshire.

She was sired by Buchan, who won the Eclipse Stakes, Champion Stakes and Doncaster Cup as well as finishing second in the 2000 Guineas and the Epsom Derby. As a breeding stallion he made his mark as a sire of fillies including Book Law and the dams of Airborne and Sun Castle. Her dam, Long Suit, finished third in the Oaks in 1921 and was a half sister to the influential broodmare Pinprick.

== Racing career ==
=== 1925: two-year-old season ===
Short Story ran twice as a two-year-old in 1925, winning the British Dominion Plate over five furlongs at Sandown Park on her debut in July. On her only other start she finished second to Legionnaire in the Buckenham Stakes at Newmarket Racecourse in October.

=== 1926: three-year-old season ===
On 30 April 1926 Short Story contested the 1000 Guineas over the Rowley Mile course at Newmarket and finished third of the twenty-nine runners behind Pillion and Trilogy, beaten one and a half lengths by the winner. The Sporting Life reported that she finished very strongly and looked capable of reversing the form over a longer distance. On 4 of June, Short Story, ridden by Bobby Jones, started the 5/1 favourite for the 148th running of the Oaks Stakes over one and a half miles at Epsom Racecourse. She won the race by four lengths from Resplendent with two lengths back to Gay Bird in third place.

In July Short Story finished third to Foliation and Part Worn in the Nassau Stakes over ten furlongs at Goodwood. In the following month she contested the Yorkshire Oaks and ran second to Doushka. On her final appearance of the season she came home third behind Glasheen and Part Worn in the Park Hill Stakes over fourteen furlongs at Doncaster Racecourse in September.

== Assessment and honours ==
In their book, A Century of Champions, based on the Timeform rating system, John Randall and Tony Morris rated Short Story a "poor" winner of the Oaks.

== Breeding record ==
Short Story was retired from racing to become a broodmare for Lord Astor's Cliveden Stud. Short Story was euthanised in 1939. She produced at least four foals and one winner between 1928 and 1939:

- Birthday Book, a colt, foaled in 1928, sired by Son-in-Law. Won six races and over £6,000.
- Oxtail, colt, 1929, by Phalaris.
- Concordat, colt, 1933, by Coronach
- Pigtail, chestnut filly, 1939, by Tai-Yang

== Pedigree ==
Pedigree of Short Story (GB), bay mare, 1923
Sire Buchan (GB) 1916	Sunstar (GB); 1908	Sundridge	Amphion
Sire Buchan (GB) 1916	Sunstar (GB); 1908	Sundridge	Sierra
Sire Buchan (GB) 1916	Sunstar (GB); 1908	Doris	Loved One
Sire Buchan (GB) 1916	Sunstar (GB); 1908	Doris	Lauretta
Sire Buchan (GB) 1916	Hamoaze (GB); 1911	Torpoint	Trenton (NZ)
Sire Buchan (GB) 1916	Hamoaze (GB); 1911	Torpoint	Doncaster Beauty
Sire Buchan (GB) 1916	Hamoaze (GB); 1911	Maid of the Mist	Cyllene
Sire Buchan (GB) 1916	Hamoaze (GB); 1911	Maid of the Mist	Sceptre
Dam Long Suit (GB) 1918	Lemberg (GB); 1907	Cyllene	Bona Vista
Dam Long Suit (GB) 1918	Lemberg (GB); 1907	Cyllene	Arcadia
Dam Long Suit (GB) 1918	Lemberg (GB); 1907	Galicia	Galopin
Dam Long Suit (GB) 1918	Lemberg (GB); 1907	Galicia	Isoletta
Dam Long Suit (GB) 1918	Third Trick (GB); 1906	William the Third	St Simon
Dam Long Suit (GB) 1918	Third Trick (GB); 1906	William the Third	Gravity
Dam Long Suit (GB) 1918	Third Trick (GB); 1906	Conjure	Juggler
Dam Long Suit (GB) 1918	Third Trick (GB); 1906	Conjure	Connie (Family 1-p)

- Short Story was inbred 3 × 4 to Cyllene, meaning that this stallion appear in both the third and fourth generation of her pedigree.
