= Saucy Sue =

British Thoroughbred racehorse

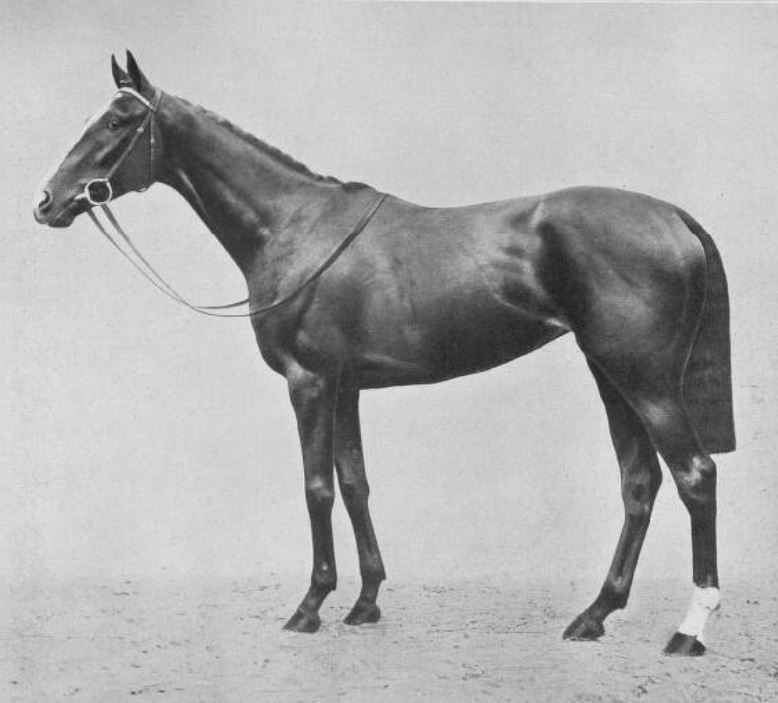
- Saucy Sue in 1925.
- Sire: Swynford
- Grandsire: John O' Gaunt
- Dam: Good and Gay
- Damsire: Bayardo
- Sex: Mare
- Foaled: 1922
- Country: United Kingdom
- Colour: Bay
- Breeder: Waldorf Astor, 2nd Viscount Astor
- Owner: Waldorf Astor, 2nd Viscount Astor
- Trainer: Alec Taylor Jr.
- Record: 10: 8–0–2
- Earnings: £26,000

Major wins
- Criterion Stakes (1924); 1000 Guineas (1925); Epsom Oaks (1925); Coronation Stakes (1925); Nassau Stakes (1925); Atalanta Stakes (1925)

Honours
- Top-rated British two-year-old (1924)

Saucy Sue (1922– July 1937) was a British Thoroughbred racehorse and broodmare, best known for winning two Classics in 1925. The filly won eight times from ten races in a racing career which lasted from July 1924 until October 1925. She was the top-rated British two-year-old of either sex in 1924, when she was unbeaten in three races. In her first two races the following year she won the 1000 Guineas over one mile at Newmarket and The Oaks over 1 1/2 miles at Epsom Downs Racecourse a month later. Saucy Sue took her unbeaten run to seven by winning the Coronation Stakes at Royal Ascot and the Nassau Stakes at Goodwood. She was defeated in her next two races and was retired from racing at the end of the season after a final win in the Atalanta Stakes at Sandown Park.

== Background ==
Saucy Sue was a bay mare with a white blaze and one white sock on her left hind foot. She was bred by her owner Waldorf Astor, 2nd Viscount Astor, an American-born politician and newspaper proprietor. Saucy Sue's sire, Swynford, was a successful racehorse and stallion, winning the St Leger Stakes in 1910 and becoming British Champion sire in 1923. Her dam, Good and Gay, was a daughter of Lord Astor's broodmare Popinjay, and therefore a half-sister of the Caulfield Cup winner Magpie. Popinjay's other descendants have included the 2000 Guineas winners Pay Up and Shadeed, the St Leger winners Book Law and Provoke, and the Kentucky Derby and Belmont Stakes winner Swale.

Astor sent the filly into training with Alec Taylor Jr. at his stables at Manton in Wiltshire. The Bloodstock Breeders'Review described her as "somewhat plain-looking" at rest but also said that she possessed "a wonderful action and a great, sweeping stride". Before her win in the Oaks, one correspondent called her "greyhoundish" in appearance, but with "immense power".

== Racing career ==
=== 1924: two-year-old season ===
In 1924 Saucy Sue was unbeaten, winning all three of her races by wide margins. She began by winning the five furlong Lavant Stakes at Goodwood in July. In October she won the Bretby Stakes at Newmarket and the Criterion Stakes at the same course two weeks later. She reportedly won the latter race very easily at odds of 1/4 and was described as "one of the smartest two-year-olds in England".

At the end of the season, at the instructions of the Jockey Club, the inaugural Free Handicap, a rating of the year's best juveniles was published. Saucy Sue was assigned top weight of 127 pounds, one pound ahead of the leading colt Picaroon, who had won the Middle Park Stakes and was also trained by Alec Taylor. The Manton stables housed another leading two-year-old filly in the form of the Cheveley Park Stakes winner Miss Gadabout: like Saucy Sue she was owned and bred by Lord Astor and was a granddaughter of Popinjay.

=== 1925: three-year-old season ===
Saucy Sue began her three-year-old season in the 1000 Guineas over Newmarket's Rowley Mile course on 3 May. Ridden by the Australian jockey Frank Bullock, she started at odds of 1/4 against ten opponents, making her the shortest priced favourite since 1904. She was never in any danger of defeat and won by six lengths from Miss Gadabout, with Firouze Mahal two lengths further back in third. According to descriptions of the race she won with her ears pricked and her mouth hanging open as her jockey struggled to restrain her. The win gave the forty-year-old Bullock a first classic win in what was to be his final season as a jockey. After the race he described Saucy Sue was the most remarkable horse he had ever ridden and said that she had won without ever traveling at more than half-speed.

Twenty-six days later, Saucy Sue was made 30/100 favourite for the Oaks in a field of twelve fillies. Ridden again by Bullock she pulled hard in the early stages as her jockey tried to restrain her and ran wide at the turn into the straight as her bit slipped through her mouth. Once Bullock allowed her to gallop freely however, she quickly went clear of the field and won by very easily by eight lengths from Miss Gadabout, who was in turn eight lengths clear of the rest. Her winning time of 2:38.2 was more than two seconds faster than that recorded by the Derby winner Manna over the same course and distance two days earlier. Following the win, she was described in the press as the best filly seen in Britain since Pretty Polly.

At Royal Ascot in June, Saucy Sue was brought back in distance to one mile for the Coronation Stakes and started at odds of 1/10. Carrying a weight of 136 pounds, she won the race by ten lengths "in a canter" from Inca and two others. A heel injury forced Saucy Sue to miss a run against colts and older horses in the Eclipse Stakes at Sandown in July, but she returned later in the month to win the Nassau Stakes over ten furlongs at Goodwood.

On 12 September, Saucy Sue was stepped up in distance for the Park Hill Stakes over 14 1/2 furlongs at Doncaster Racecourse. Taylor's original intention had been to run the filly in the St Leger at the same meeting, but plans were revised after she was beaten by Picaroon in a trial race at Manton. She was beaten for the first time as she finished third of the four runners, beaten twelve lengths by the Aga Khan's filly Juldi. In her next race she finished third to the colts Conquistador and Warden of the Marches in the Royal Stakes at Newmarket on 17 October, leading some commentators to offer the opinion that she had been over-rated as a result of wins against an unusually weak crop of three-year-old fillies. Saucy Sue ended her career with a win in late October as she defeated five opponents in the ten furlong Atalanta Stakes at Sandown. Saucy Sue's earnings of £22,155 for the year enabled Lord Astor to claim the title of British flat racing Champion Owner for the 1925 season.

== Assessment and honours ==
In their book, A Century of Champions, based on the Timeform rating system, John Randall and Tony Morris rated Saucy Sue a "superior" winner of the 1000 Guineas and Oaks and the twentieth best filly trained in Britain or Ireland in the 20th century.

== Stud record ==
As a broodmare, Saucy Sue produced a good colt in Truculent, sired by Teddy, who won the Royal Standard Stakes at Manchester Racecourse and made a promising start as a breeding stallion before dying in 1937 at the age of ten.

== Pedigree ==
Pedigree of Saucy Sue (GB), bay mare, 1922
Sire Swynford (GB) 1907	John O'Gaunt; 1901	Isinglass	Isonomy
Sire Swynford (GB) 1907	John O'Gaunt; 1901	Isinglass	Dead Lock
Sire Swynford (GB) 1907	John O'Gaunt; 1901	La Fleche	St. Simon
Sire Swynford (GB) 1907	John O'Gaunt; 1901	La Fleche	Quiver
Sire Swynford (GB) 1907	Canterbury Pilgrim; 1893	Tristan	Hermit
Sire Swynford (GB) 1907	Canterbury Pilgrim; 1893	Tristan	Thrift
Sire Swynford (GB) 1907	Canterbury Pilgrim; 1893	Pilgrimage	The Palmer
Sire Swynford (GB) 1907	Canterbury Pilgrim; 1893	Pilgrimage	Lady Audley
Dam Good and Gay (GB) 1912	Bayardo; 1906	Bay Ronald	Hampton
Dam Good and Gay (GB) 1912	Bayardo; 1906	Bay Ronald	Black Duchess
Dam Good and Gay (GB) 1912	Bayardo; 1906	Galicia	Galopin
Dam Good and Gay (GB) 1912	Bayardo; 1906	Galicia	Isoletta
Dam Good and Gay (GB) 1912	Popinjay; 1905	St. Frusquin	St. Simon
Dam Good and Gay (GB) 1912	Popinjay; 1905	St. Frusquin	Isabel
Dam Good and Gay (GB) 1912	Popinjay; 1905	Chelandry	Goldfinch
Dam Good and Gay (GB) 1912	Popinjay; 1905	Chelandry	Illuminata (Family: 1-n)
