= Taj Mah =

Irish-bred Thoroughbred racehorse

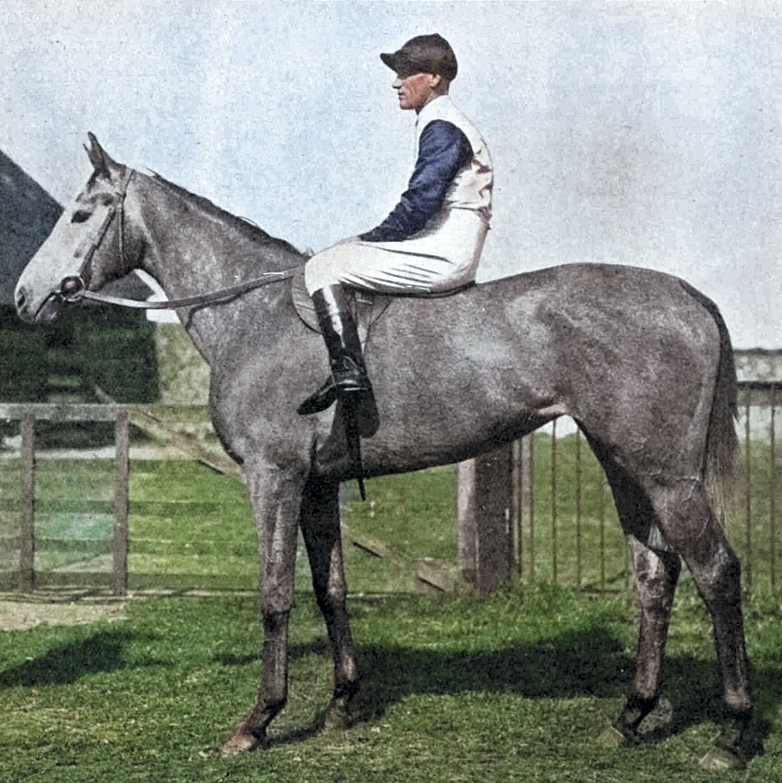
- Taj Mah in 1929.
- Sire: Lemberg
- Grandsire: Cyllene
- Dam: Taj Mahal
- Damsire: The Tetrarch
- Sex: Mare
- Foaled: 1926
- Country: Ireland
- Colour: Grey
- Breeder: Aga Khan III
- Owner: Simon Guthmann
- Trainer: Juan Torterolo
- Record: 6: 4-0-0

Major wins
- 1000 Guineas (1929)

Taj Mah (1926 – after 1935) was an Irish-bred, French-trained Thoroughbred racehorse and broodmare. She showed ability as a two-year-old in France when she won three of her five races but was not expected to make further progress. In the spring of 1929 she was sent to England and recorded a 33/1 upset victory in the 1000 Guineas but never raced again. As a broodmare she produced at least two high-class winners.

== Background ==
Taj Mah was a "tiny" grey mare, standing barely 15 hands high bred in Ireland by Aga Khan III. As a yearling she was considered surplus to her owner's requirements and put up for sale. She was bought for 250,000 francs by Simon Guthmann who sent her into training in France with the Argentinian Juan Torterolo.

She was from one of the last crops of foals sired by Lemberg, whose wins included the Epsom Derby, Eclipse Stakes and Champion Stakes. Lemberg also sired the Ellangowan and Pogrom and had been Champion sire in 1922. Her dam Taj Mahal also produced Taj Kasra (Windsor Castle Stakes) and Taj Shirin, the dam of the Derby runner-up Taj Akbar and the Irish Derby winner Nathoo.

== Racing career ==
=== 1928: two-year-old season ===
Taj Mah won three minor races from five starts in France in 1928 and was rated the ninth best juvenile of the season in the French Handicap Libre. The filly was however thought to have stamina limitations and unlikely to stay further than 1200 metres (six furlongs).

=== 1929: three-year-old season ===
Juan Torterolo felt that there was little point in sending the filly to race in England in the spring of 1929 but was overruled by the owner and Taj Mah temporarily joined the stable of Victor Gilpin at Newmarket. Her chances of success in Britain were not improved when she became highly agitated and distressed on the boat journey across the English Channel. On 3 May, with the Australian Wally Sibbritt in the saddle, she started a 33/1 outsider in a 19 runner field for the 116th running of the 1000 Guineas over the Rowley Mile course. Before the race she looked unimpressive being described as "deficient in size" and a mere "pony" in comparison to her rivals. The joint-favourites for the ace were Sister Anne and Almondale while the other fancied runners included Necklace (Prix Morny) and Arabella (Queen Mary Stakes, Champagne Stakes). In a major upset Taj Mah took the lead from Arabella a furlong from the finish and won by a length from Sister Anne, with Ellanvale a short head away in third place.

Taj Mah did not race again and was retired at the end of the year.

== Assessment and honours ==
In their book, A Century of Champions, based on the Timeform rating system, John Randall and Tony Morris rated Taj Mah a "poor" winner of the 1000 Guineas.

== Breeding record ==
After her retirement from racing Taj Mah became a broodmare for Simon Guthmann's stud. She produced at least three foals between 1931 and 1935:

- Birmah, a grey colt, foaled in 1931, sired by Biribi. Won Prix de Courcelles.
- Birmania, filly, 1933, by Biribi. Won Prix de Pomone
- Rajah, grey colt, 1935, by Blandford

== Pedigree ==
Pedigree of Taj Mah (IRE), grey mare, 1926
Sire Lemberg (GB) 1907	Cyllene (GB); 1895	Bona Vista	Bend Or
Sire Lemberg (GB) 1907	Cyllene (GB); 1895	Bona Vista	Vista
Sire Lemberg (GB) 1907	Cyllene (GB); 1895	Arcadia	Isonomy
Sire Lemberg (GB) 1907	Cyllene (GB); 1895	Arcadia	Distant Shore
Sire Lemberg (GB) 1907	Galicia (GB); 1898	Galopin	Vedette
Sire Lemberg (GB) 1907	Galicia (GB); 1898	Galopin	Flying Duchess
Sire Lemberg (GB) 1907	Galicia (GB); 1898	Isoletta	Isonomy
Sire Lemberg (GB) 1907	Galicia (GB); 1898	Isoletta	Lady Muncaster
Dam Taj Mahal (IRE) 1921	The Tetrarch (IRE); 1911	Roi Herode (FR)	Le Samaritain
Dam Taj Mahal (IRE) 1921	The Tetrarch (IRE); 1911	Roi Herode (FR)	Roxelane
Dam Taj Mahal (IRE) 1921	The Tetrarch (IRE); 1911	Vahren (GB)	Bona Vista
Dam Taj Mahal (IRE) 1921	The Tetrarch (IRE); 1911	Vahren (GB)	Castania
Dam Taj Mahal (IRE) 1921	Mariota (GB); 1912	St Victrix	St Maclou
Dam Taj Mahal (IRE) 1921	Mariota (GB); 1912	St Victrix	Winged Victory
Dam Taj Mahal (IRE) 1921	Mariota (GB); 1912	Craigmaddie	Minting
Dam Taj Mahal (IRE) 1921	Mariota (GB); 1912	Craigmaddie	Kate Craig (Family 4-p)

- Taj Mah was inbred 3 × 4 to Bona Vista, meaning that this stallion appears in both the third and fourth generation of her pedigree. She was also inbred 4 × 4 to Isonomy.
