= Book Law =

British thoroughbred racehorse

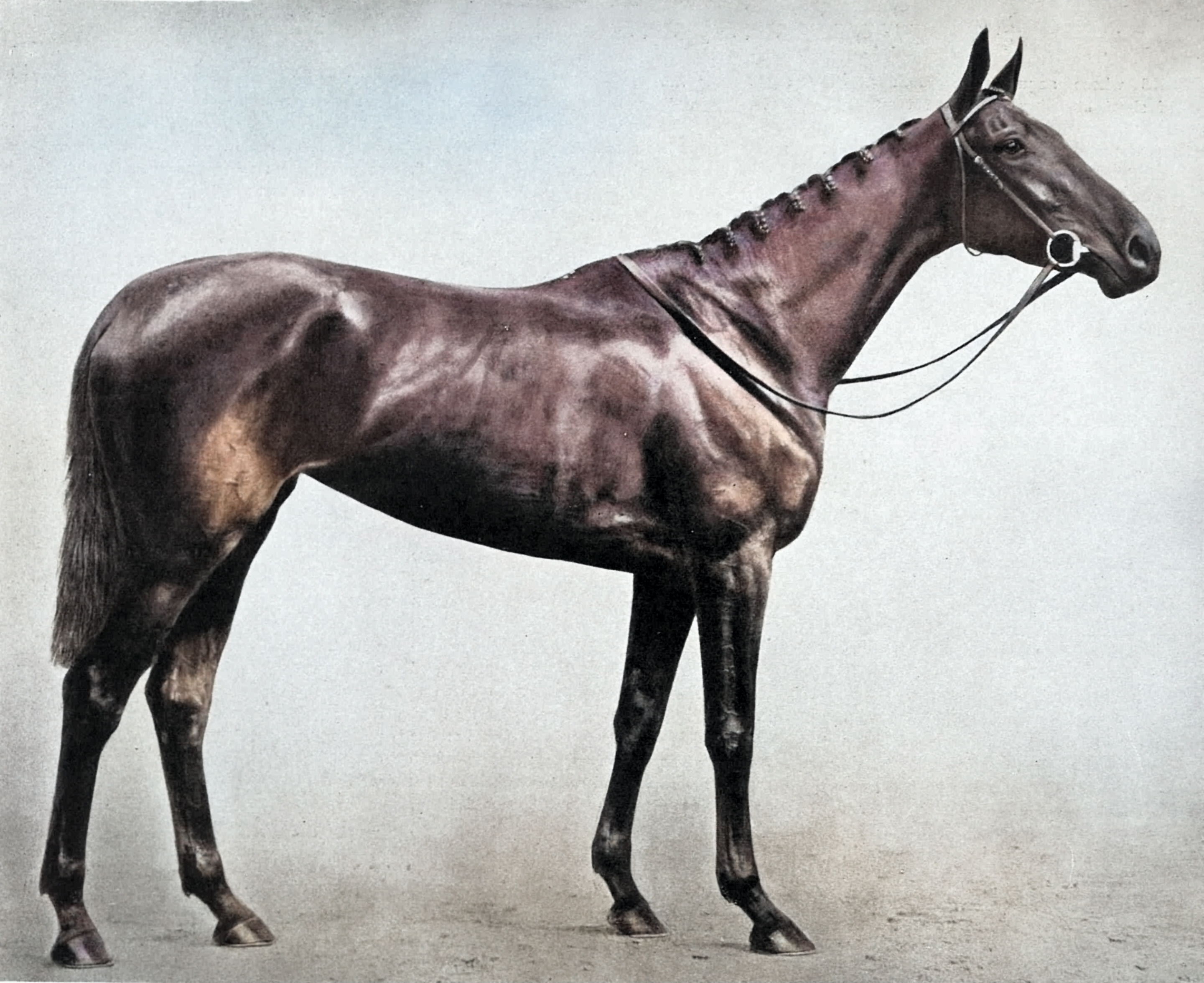
- Book Law in 1927.
- Sire: Buchan
- Grandsire: Sunstar
- Dam: Popingaol
- Damsire: Dark Ronald
- Sex: Mare
- Foaled: 1924
- Country: United Kingdom
- Colour: Bay
- Breeder: Waldorf Astor, 2nd Viscount Astor
- Owner: Lord Astor
- Trainer: Alec Taylor, Jr. Joseph Lawson
- Record: 14: 8-2-3
- Earnings: £31,875

Major wins
- Queen Mary Stakes (1926); Coronation Stakes (1927); Welsh Oaks (1927); Gratwicke Stakes (1927); Nassau Stakes (1927); St Leger (1927); Jockey Club Stakes (1927); Burwell Stakes (1928)

Awards
- Biggest prize-money winner in Britain (1927)

Book Law (1924 – 1944) was a British Thoroughbred racehorse and broodmare. The best female racehorse of her generation in Britain, she was noted for her courage and consistency and in her prime she was described as a "fighting machine".

She showed great promise as a two-year-old in 1926 when she won the Queen Mary Stakes at Royal Ascot. In the following year she finished second in both the 1000 Guineas and the Oaks Stakes, before embarking on a six-race winning streak which included the Coronation Stakes, Nassau Stakes, St Leger and Jockey Club Stakes. As a four-year-old in 1928 she won the Burwell Stakes on her seasonal debut but then finished third in both the Coronation Cup and the Eclipse Stakes, after which she was retired from racing to become a broodmare.

Her foals included the top class colts Rhodes Scholar and Canon Law, the influential broodmare Highway Code and Archive, a racehorse of no account who sired Arkle.

== Background ==
Book Law was a bay mare bred in the United Kingdom by her owner Waldorf Astor, 2nd Viscount Astor. She was sent into training with Alec Taylor, Jr. at his stable at Manton, Wiltshire.

She was sired by Buchan, who won the Eclipse Stakes, Champion Stakes and Doncaster Cup as well as finishing second in the 2000 Guineas and the Epsom Derby. As a breeding stallion he made his mark as a sire of fillies including Short Story and the dams of Airborne and Sun Castle. Her dam Popingaol won two minor races but became a very successful broodmare whose other foals included Pogrom, Splendid Jay (Yorkshire Oaks), Book Debt (dam of Pay Up) and Fair Cop (female-line ancestor of Provoke).

== Racing career ==
=== 1926: two-year-old season ===
Book Law made her first impact in June 1926 when she contested the Queen Mary Stakes at Royal Ascot in which she was ridden by Robert A "Bobby" Jones and won at odds of 7/2. At Sandown Park in July she ran unplaced behind Priscilla in the National Breeders' Produce Stakes. In autumn she finished third to Applecross in the Moulton Stakes at Newmarket.

Towards the end of the year she was described as the best horse of her age and sex in England.

=== 1927: three-year-old season ===
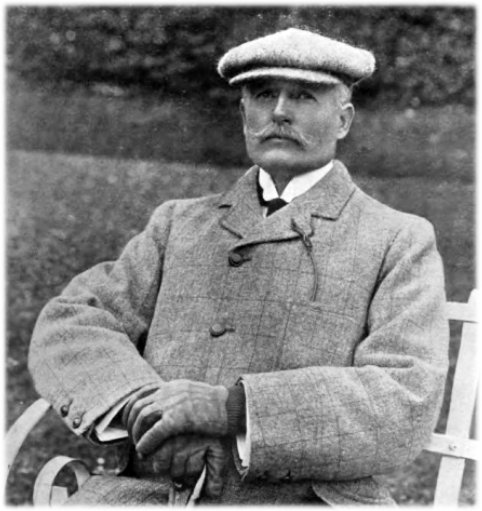
Alec Taylor, Jr, who trained Book Law until the end of 1927

In a twenty-eight runner field for the 1000 Guineas over the Rowley mile at Newmarket Racecourse on 29 April, Book Law dead-heated for second place with Endowment, two lengths behind the winner Cresta Run. On 3 of June Book Law started the 5/2 favourite Oaks Stakes over 1 1/2 miles at Epsom Racecourse. She took the lead approaching the final turn but was overtaken in the closing stages and beaten a head by Beam in a "terrific race". Book Law was then dropped back in distance for the Coronation Stakes over one mile, which, with a first prize of £4,750, was the most valuable run that year at Royal Ascot. Ridden by Henri Jellis she started the 4/9 favourite and won from Lord Furness's Gay Baby. The filly maintained her good form through the summer of 1927, taking the Welsh Oaks at Chepstow and the Gratwicke Stakes at Goodwood before winning the Nassau Stakes (again at Goodwood) at odds of 2/5.

On 7 September, with Jellis in the saddle, Book Law started the 7/4 favourite in a field of sixteen colts and fillies for the 152nd running of the St Leger over 14 1/2 furlongs at Doncaster Racecourse. The race had been deprived of some interest by the absence of the Derby winner Call Boy, whose entry had been rendered void by the death of his owner. Racing on heavy ground Book Law was always in close contention before going to the front early in the straight. She repelled a challenge from the Derby runner-up Hot Night and drew away to win by three lengths with five lengths back to Son and Heir in third place.

Three weeks after her Leger success, Book Law ended her second season with a run in the jockey Club Stakes over fourteen furlongs at Newmaarket in which she was matched against older horses. Starting at odds of 4/6, she won by three quarters of a length from the four-year-old Foliation. By the end of 1927 she was being described as the best three-year-old in England of either sex. He earnings of £22,316 made her easily the most financially successful horse of the year.

When Alec Taylor retired the Manton stable was taken over by his assistant Joseph Lawson

=== 1928: four-year-old season ===
Book Law began her second season by winning the Burwell Stakes over 1 1/2 miles at Newmarket in May. At Epsom in June she started favourite for the Coronation Cup but began to struggle soon after half way and finished third behind the Italian-bred five-year-old Apelle. Both Lord Astor and Henri Jellis were bitterly disappointed by her performance, but it was subsequently found that she had been suffering from a "kidney infection". The filly missed an intended run in the Ascot Gold Cup but returned on 20 July for the Eclipse Stakes at Sandown and finished third to Fairway and Royal Minstrel.

Book Law's retirement was announced shortly after her defeat at Sandown. She ended her career with earnings of £31,875, making her the fourth most successful female racehorse in British turf history up to that time behind Sceptre (£38,283), Pretty Polly (£36,638) and La Fleche (£34,703).

== Assessment and honours ==
In their book, A Century of Champions, based on the Timeform rating system, John Randall and Tony Morris rated Book Law an "average" winner of the St Leger.

== Stud record ==
Book Law was retired from racing to become a broodmare for Lord Astor's stud. Book Law died in November 1944 in a paddock accident at the Cliveden Stud. She produced at least ten foals between 1930 and 1944:

- Canon Law, a bay colt, foaled in 1930, sired by Colorado. Won St James's Palace Stakes.
- Law Maker, brown colt, 1931, by Phalaris
- Rhodes Scholar, bay colt, 1933, by Pharos. Won Eclipse Stakes.
- Light Sentence, chestnut filly, 1934 by Pharos.
- Legal Fare, bay colt, 1935, by Manna
- Sun Lore, bay colt, 1938, by Hyperion. Winner.
- Highway Code, bay filly, 1939, by Hyperion. Winner. Female-line ancestor of Swale, Shadeed and Forty Niner.
- Hampton Hall, bay or brown colt, 1940, Dastur
- Archive, bay colt, 1941, by Nearco. Sire of Arkle.
- Handley Cross, colt (later gelded), 1944, by Foxhunter

== Pedigree ==
Pedigree of Book Law (GB), bay mare, 1924
Sire Buchan (GB) 1916	Sunstar (GB); 1908	Sundridge	Amphion
Sire Buchan (GB) 1916	Sunstar (GB); 1908	Sundridge	Sierra
Sire Buchan (GB) 1916	Sunstar (GB); 1908	Doris	Loved One
Sire Buchan (GB) 1916	Sunstar (GB); 1908	Doris	Lauretta
Sire Buchan (GB) 1916	Hamoaze (GB); 1911	Torpoint	Trenton (NZ)
Sire Buchan (GB) 1916	Hamoaze (GB); 1911	Torpoint	Doncaster Beauty
Sire Buchan (GB) 1916	Hamoaze (GB); 1911	Maid of the Mist	Cyllene
Sire Buchan (GB) 1916	Hamoaze (GB); 1911	Maid of the Mist	Sceptre
Dam Popingaol (GB) 1913	Dark Ronald (IRE); 1905	Bay Ronald (GB)	Hampton
Dam Popingaol (GB) 1913	Dark Ronald (IRE); 1905	Bay Ronald (GB)	Black Duchess
Dam Popingaol (GB) 1913	Dark Ronald (IRE); 1905	Darkie (GB)	Thurio
Dam Popingaol (GB) 1913	Dark Ronald (IRE); 1905	Darkie (GB)	Insignia
Dam Popingaol (GB) 1913	Popinjay (GB); 1905	St Frusquin	St Simon
Dam Popingaol (GB) 1913	Popinjay (GB); 1905	St Frusquin	Isabel
Dam Popingaol (GB) 1913	Popinjay (GB); 1905	Chelandry	Goldfinch
Dam Popingaol (GB) 1913	Popinjay (GB); 1905	Chelandry	Illuminata (Family 1-n)
