= Sunny Jane (horse) =

British-bred Thoroughbred racehorse

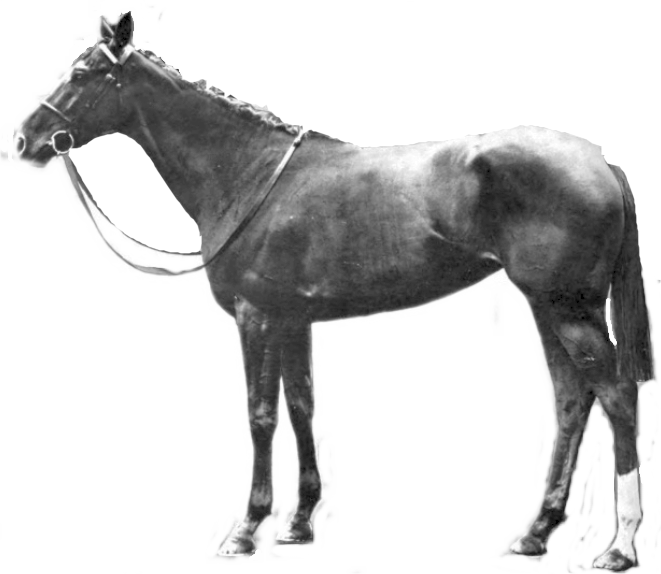
- Sire: Sunstar
- Grandsire: Sundridge
- Dam: Maid of the Mist
- Damsire: Cyllene
- Sex: Mare
- Foaled: 1914
- Country: United Kingdom of Great Britain and Ireland
- Colour: Chestnut
- Breeder: Waldorf Astor, 2nd Viscount Astor
- Owner: Lord Astor
- Trainer: Alec Taylor, Jr.
- Record: 6: 2-1-0

Major wins
- Oaks Stakes (1917)

Sunny Jane (1914 – after 1925) was a British Thoroughbred racehorse and broodmare. She was slow to mature and finished unplaced on her only start as a two-year-old in 1916. Her second season was dominated by her rivalry with the brilliantly fast filly Diadem. Sunny Jane was narrowly beaten by her rival in the 1000 Guineas but reversed the form over a longer distance to win the New Oaks. She won one other race but lost her form in the autumn and was retired from racing. As a broodmare she produced few winners but exerted an enduring influence through her daughter Miss Cavendish.

== Background ==
Sunny Jane was a chestnut mare bred in the United Kingdom by her owner Waldorf Astor, 2nd Viscount Astor. She was sent into training with Alec Taylor, Jr. at his stable at Manton, Wiltshire.

She was from the second crop of foals sired by Sunstar who won the 2000 Guineas and the Epsom Derby in 1911 before his career was ended by injury. Sunny Jane's dam Maid of the Mist was a daughter of Sceptre and an influential broodmare in her own right, who also produced the 2000 Guineas winner Craig an Eran. Her other descendants have included Buchan, Commanche Run, Full Dress, Swiftfoot and One in a Million.

Sunny Jane's racing career took place during World War I. Many racecourses were closed for the duration of the conflict and all five of traditional British Classic Races were run at Newmarket.

== Racing career ==
=== 1916: two-year-old season ===
On her only run as a two-year-old, Sunny Jane finished last of the five runners in the Bretby Post Stakes at Newmarket.

=== 1917: three-year-old season ===
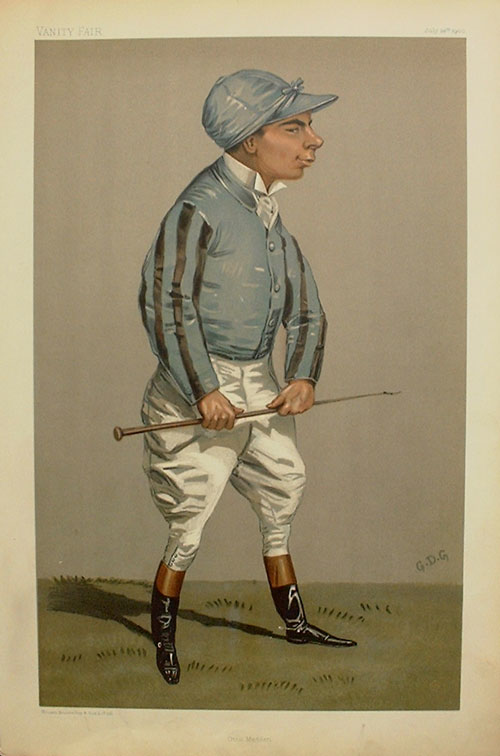
Otto Madden, who rode Sunny Jane to win the Oaks

On 4 May Sunny Jane was one of fourteen fillies to contest the 1000 Guineas at Newmarket and before the race Alec Taylor said "that big, green filly of mine will run well". Diadem started 6/4 favourite and won as expected but Sunny Jane finished very strongly and was only half a length away in second place. Two months later she reportedly won a race at the Newmarket July meeting.

The New Oaks was run in "wretched" weather on 2 August at Newmarket and attracted a field of eleven runners with Diadem starting the 7/4 favourite. Sunny Jane, ridden by Otto Madden, was second choice in the betting on 4/1 while the best of the other runners appeared to be Molly Desmond (Cheveley Park Stakes) and Hampshire Lily. Appearing to be well-suited by the heavy ground conditions, Sunny Jane took the lead just after the start and quickly opened up a lead of five lengths from Hampshire Lily and Diadem. Although the favourite closed the margin in the straight, Madden appeared to have left something in reserve and won by half a length from Diadem, with four lengths back to Moravia in third.

Sunny Jane returned in autumn but ran poorly behind Quarryman in the Select Stakes. For her final appearance she was assigned a weight of 111 pounds in the Cambridgeshire Handicap and started at odds of 100/6 (approximately 16/1). With Madden in the saddle she tracked the leaders for most of the way but faded in the final stages and finished eleventh of the fourteen runners.

== Assessment and honours ==
In their book, A Century of Champions, based on the Timeform rating system, John Randall and Tony Morris rated Sunny Jane an "average" winner of the Oaks.

== Breeding record ==
After being retired from racing at the end of her second season, Sunny Jane became a broodmare for Lord Astor's stud. Her foals included:

- Miss Cavendish, a chestnut filly, foaled in 1919, sired by Chaucer. Her female-line descendants have included Red Bullet, Noalcoholic and Tin Horse (Poule d'Essai des Poulains).
- Bright Knight, bay colt, 1921, by Gay Crusader. Won five races. Second in the 2000 Guineas

== Pedigree ==
Pedigree of Sunny Jane (GB), chestnut mare, 1914
Sire Sunstar (GB) 1908	Sundridge; 1898	Amphion	Rosebery
Sire Sunstar (GB) 1908	Sundridge; 1898	Amphion	Suicide
Sire Sunstar (GB) 1908	Sundridge; 1898	Sierra	Springfield
Sire Sunstar (GB) 1908	Sundridge; 1898	Sierra	Sanda
Sire Sunstar (GB) 1908	Doris; 1898	Loved One	See Saw
Sire Sunstar (GB) 1908	Doris; 1898	Loved One	Pilgrimage
Sire Sunstar (GB) 1908	Doris; 1898	Lauretta	Petrarch
Sire Sunstar (GB) 1908	Doris; 1898	Lauretta	Ambuscade
Dam Maid of the Mist (GB) 1906	Cyllene; 1895	Bona Vista	Bend Or
Dam Maid of the Mist (GB) 1906	Cyllene; 1895	Bona Vista	Vista
Dam Maid of the Mist (GB) 1906	Cyllene; 1895	Arcadia	Isonomy
Dam Maid of the Mist (GB) 1906	Cyllene; 1895	Arcadia	Distant Shore
Dam Maid of the Mist (GB) 1906	Sceptre; 1899	Persimmon	St Simon
Dam Maid of the Mist (GB) 1906	Sceptre; 1899	Persimmon	Perdita
Dam Maid of the Mist (GB) 1906	Sceptre; 1899	Ornament	Bend Or
Dam Maid of the Mist (GB) 1906	Sceptre; 1899	Ornament	Lily Agnes (Family: 16-h)

- Though her dam Maid of the Mist, Sunny Jane was inbred 4 × 4 to Bend Or, meaning that this stallion appears twice in the fourth generation of her pedigree.
