= Otto Madden =

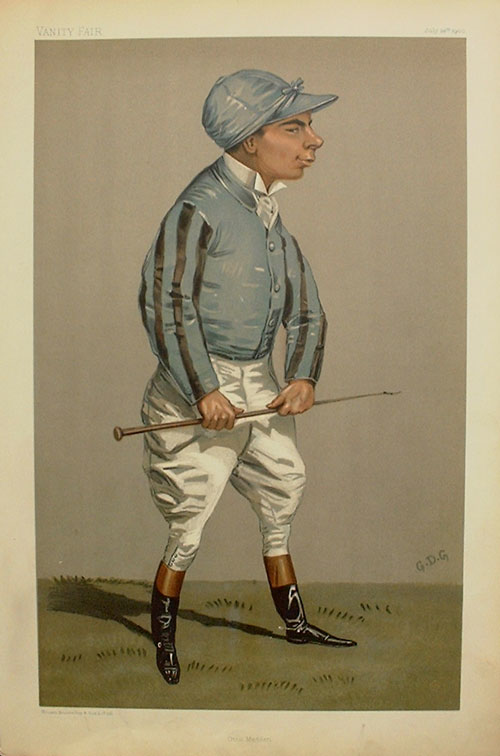
- Caricature of Otto Madden from Vanity Fair magazine, 26 July 1900

Personal information
- Born: 1872
- Died: 1942 (aged 69)
- Occupation: Jockey

Horse racing career
- Sport: Horse racing

Major racing wins
- British Classic Race wins as jockey: 2000 Guineas (1908); Epsom Derby (1898); Epsom Oaks (1899, 1917); St. Leger (1905)

Racing awards
- British flat racing Champion Jockey 4 times (1898, 1901, 1903, 1904)

Significant horses
- Jeddah, Sunny Jane

Herbert Otto Madden (2 January 1873 in Hoppegarten – 21 May 1942 in Newmarket, Suffolk) was a four time British flat racing Champion Jockey

He was born to a jockey father, who had ridden Kincsem an unbeaten horse that won 54 races from 54 starts. Otto Madden was first apprenticed to James Waugh and then to Richard Marsh. For Marsh he won the Derby on the 100/1 longest-priced winner of all time, Jeddah in 1898. That same year he also won the Cesarewitch and Manchester November Handicap and ended the season as Champion Jockey. He went on to win every British Classic except the 1,000 Guineas.

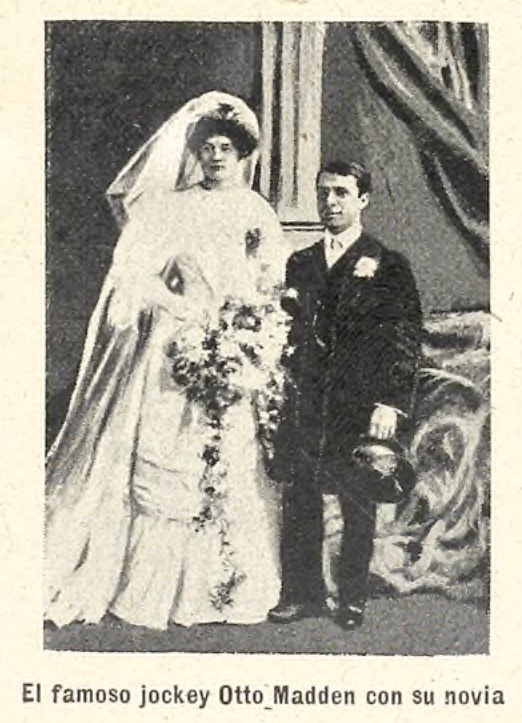
Otto Madden with his girlfriend in Argentine magazine PBT, January 14th 1905

It has been suggested by some that he pulled Wool Winder when on course for a second Derby win in 1907. His last big race win came in the 1917 Oaks on Sunny Jane. Officially, he had retired, but he had returned to race riding due to the limited number of jockeys available during World War I. He later bred, owned and trained Chapeau to win the 1925 Ebor Handicap.

In 1999, the Racing Post ranked him 30th in their list of the Top 50 jockeys of the 20th century. He still holds the record for most wins (as a jockey) of the Wokingham Handicap at Royal Ascot, a race he won three times in the 1890s.

== Major Wins ==
(United Kingdom) Great Britain

=== Classic Races ===
- 2,000 Guineas – Norman III (1908)
- Derby – Jeddah (1898)
- Oaks – Musa (1899), Sunny Jane (1917)
- St. Leger – Challacombe (1905)

=== Selected other races ===
- Cesarewitch Handicap – Chaleureux (1898)
- Coronation Cup – Pretty Polly (1905)
- Eclipse Stakes – Ard Patrick (1903)
- July Cup – Delaunay (1905)
- King's Stand Stakes – Delaunay (1905)
- Manchester November Handicap – Chaleureux (1898)
- Wokingham Handicap – Oatlands (1894), Kilcock (1896), Minstrel (1898)
