= Nassau Stakes =

Flat horse race in Britain

- Class: Group 1
- Location: Goodwood Racecourse; W. Sussex, England
- Inaugurated: 1840
- Race type: Flat / Thoroughbred
- Sponsor: Qatar
- Website: Goodwood

Race information
- Distance: 1m 1f 197y (1,991 m)
- Surface: Turf
- Track: Right-handed
- Qualification: Three-years-old and up fillies & mares
- Weight: 9 st 0 lb (3yo); 9 st 9 lb (4yo+)
- Purse: £600,000 (2025); 1st: £340,260

Nassau Stakes
2026
Diamond Necklace	Friendly Soul	See The Fire

Previous years
2025
Whirl	Cercene	See The Fire
2024
Opera Singer	See The Fire	Sparkling Plenty
2023
Al Husn	Above The Curve	Nashwa
2022
Nashwa	Aristia	Lilac Road
2021
Lady Bowthorpe	Zeyaadah	Joan Of Arc

2020-2011
2020
Fancy Blue	One Voice	Nazeef
2019
Deirdre	Mehdaayih	Rawdaa
2018
Wild Illusion	Urban Fox	Veracious
2017
Winter	Blond Me	Sobetsu
2016
Minding	Queen's Trust	Jemayel
2015
Legatissimo	Wedding Vow	Arabian Queen
2014
Sultanina	Narniyn	Venus de Milo
2013
Winsili	Thistle Bird	Hot Snap
2012
The Fugue	Timepiece	Was
2011
Midday	Snow Fairy	Principal Role

2010-2001
2010
Midday	Stacelita	Antara
2009
Midday	Rainbow View	Moneycantbuymelove
2008
Halfway To Heaven	Lush Lashes	Passage of Time
2007
Peeping Fawn	Mandesha	Light Shift
2006
Ouija Board	Alexander Goldrun	Nannina
2005
Alexander Goldrun	Cassydora	Red Bloom
2004
Favourable Terms	Silence Is Golden	Chorist
2003
Russian Rhythm	Ana Marie	Zee Zee Top
2002
Islington	Sulk	Quarter Moon
2001
Lailani	Snowflake	Time Away

2000-1991
2000
Crimplene	Ela Athena	Princess Ellen
1999
Zahrat Dubai	Lady In Waiting	Diamond White
1998
Alborada	Digitalize	Midnight Line
1997
Ryafan	Entice	Papering
1996
Last Second	Papering	Annaba
1995
Caramba	Warning Shadows	Erin Bird
1994
Hawajiss	Del Deya	Relatively Special
1993
Lyphard's Delta	Only Royale	Sueboog
1992
Ruby Tiger	All At Sea	Mohican Girl
1991
Ruby Tiger	Shamshir	North Wind

1990-1981
1990
Kartajana	Starlet	Moon Cactus
1989
Mamaluna	Lady Shipley	Tessla
1988
Ela Romara	Sudden Love	Ashayer
1987
Nom de Plume	Three Tails	Mamouna
1986
Park Express	Maysoon	Asteroid Field
1985
Free Guest	I Want To Be	Domino's Nurse
1984
Optimistic Lass	Desirable	Miss Beaulieu
1983
Acclimatise	Elysian	La Grigia
1982
Dancing Rocks	Time Charter	Triple Tipple
1981
Go Leasing	Vielle	Strigida

1980-1970
1980
Vielle	Bonnie Isle	Dancing Shadow
1979
Connaught Bridge	Odeon	Tempus Fugit
1978
Cistus	Seraphima	Double Lock
1977
Triple First	Western Star	Ranimer
1976
Roussalka	Sauceboat	Silken Way
1975
Roussalka	Sauceboat	Foiled Again
1974
Mil's Bomb	Himawari	Silk Buds
1973
Cheveley Princess	Fisherman's Bridge	Miss Petard
1972
Crespinall	Sarkless Kitty	Spirit in the Sky
1971
Catherine Wheel	Maina	Seaswan
1970
Pulchra	Francoise	Royal Pancake

The Nassau Stakes is a Group 1 flat horse race in Great Britain open to fillies and mares aged three years or older. It is run at Goodwood over a distance of 1 mile, 1 furlong and 197 yards (1,991 metres), and it is scheduled to take place each year in late July or early August.

== History ==
The title of the event acknowledges the friendship between the 5th Duke of Richmond, a former owner of Goodwood Racecourse, and the House of Orange-Nassau. The race was established in 1840, and it was originally restricted to three-year-old fillies. During the early part of its history it was contested over a distance of 1 mile. It was extended to 1½ miles in 1900, and shortened to its present length in 1911.

The Nassau Stakes was opened to fillies and mares aged four or older in 1975. For a period it was classed at Group 2 level, and it was promoted to Group 1 status in 1999.

The race is currently held on the third day of the five-day Glorious Goodwood meeting.

== Records ==
Most successful horse (3 wins):

- Midday – 2009, 2010, 2011

Leading jockey (6 wins):

- Nat Flatman – Dil-bar (1842), Mania (1843), Clementina (1847), Clarissa (1849), Hirsuta (1852), Cantine (1859)
- Sir Gordon Richards – Solfatara (1933), Coppelia (1935), Barrowby Gem (1936), Goblet (1948), Jet Plane (1949), Sea Parrot (1951)

Leading trainer (8 wins):

- Sir Henry Cecil – Roussalka (1975, 1976), Connaught Bridge (1979), Nom de Plume (1987), Lyphard's Delta (1993), Midday (2009, 2010, 2011)

Leading owner (9 wins):

- Sue Magnier – Peeping Fawn (2007), Halfway to Heaven (2008), Legatissimo (2015), Minding (2016), Winter (2017), Fancy Blue (2020), Opera Singer (2024), Whirl (2025), Diamond Necklace (2026)

== Winners since 1900 ==
Year	Winner	Age	Jockey	Trainer	Owner	Time
1900	Merry Gal	3	Lester Reiff	Jack Robinson
1901	Royal Summons	3	Mornington Cannon	Willie Waugh
1902	Sceptre	3	Frank Hardy	Bob Sievier	Bob Sievier	2:40.00
1903	Red Lily	3
1904	Pretty Polly	3	William Lane	Peter Gilpin	Eustace Loder
1905	Cherry Lass	3	Herbert Jones	Jack Robinson	William Hall Walker
1906	Glasconbury	3	Danny Maher	George Lambton
1907	Altitude	3	Danny Maher	George Lambton
1908	Siberia	3	Bernard Dillon	Peter Gilpin
1909	Maid Of The Mist	3	Danny Maher	Alec Taylor Jr.
1910	Winkipop	3	Herbert Jones	Willie Waugh	Waldorf Astor
1911	Hair Trigger II	3	Frank Wootton	George Lambton
1912	Belleisle	3	Danny Maher	Willie Waugh
1913	Arda	3	Danny Maher	Basil Jarvis
1914	First Spear	3	James Clark	Alec Taylor Jr.
1915-18	No race
1919	Keysoe	3	Bernard Carslake	George Lambton	Lord Derby
1920	Most Beautiful	3	Izaak Strydom	Pat Hartigan
1921	Pompadour	3	Jack Brennan	Alec Taylor Jr.		2:14.40
1922	Selene	3	Ted Gardner	George Lambton		2:10.60
1923	Concertina	3	Frank Bullock	Alec Taylor Jr.		2:13.00
1924	Straitlace	3	Charlie Elliott	Dawson Waugh	Edward Hulton	2:22.00
1925	Saucy Sue	3	Frank Bullock	Alec Taylor Jr.	Waldorf Astor, 2nd Viscount Astor
1926	Foliation	3	Jack Brennan	Alec Taylor Jr.		2:11.60
1927	Book Law	3	Henri Jelliss	Alec Taylor Jr.	Waldorf Astor, 2nd Viscount Astor	2:20.80
1928	La Sologne	3	Jack Sirett	Joseph Lawson		2:10.40
1929	Nuwara Eliya	3	Bobby Jones	Joseph Lawson		2:10.60
1930	Quinine	3	Freddie Fox	Fred Darling		2:12.40
1931	Suze	3	Bobby Jones	Fred Molony		2:18.40
1932	Ada Dear	3	Richard Perryman	Tommy Hogg		2:23.20
1933	Solfatara	3	Gordon Richards	Basil Jarvis	Miss J B Courtauld	2:11.20
1934	Zelina	3	Steve Donoghue	Hugh Powney	Z G Michalinos	2:11.00
1935	Coppelia	3	Gordon Richards	Fred Templeman	Lord Hirst	2:10.20
1936	Barrowby Glen	3	Gordon Richards	Fred Templeman	Sir Frederick Eley	2:19.20
1937	First Flight	3	Harry Wragg	Ossie Bell	Lord Londonderry	2:11.60
1938	Valedeh	3	Doug Smith	Frank Butters	Aga Khan III	2:12.00
1939	Olein	3	Tommy Lowrey	Basil Jarvis	Lord Glanely	2:13.80
1940-45	No race
1946	Wayward Belle	3	Eph Smith	Jack Jarvis	Lord Milford	2:13.80
1947	Wild Child	3	Tommy Lowrey	Richard Perryman	Mrs S Joel	2:12.20
1948	Goblet	3	Gordon Richards	Noel Murless	Fred Darling	2:10.60
1949	Jet Plane	3	Gordon Richards	Jack Colling	Lord Astor	2:12.80
1950	Flying Slipper	3	Harry Carr	Cecil Boyd-Rochfort	Mrs W P Wyatt	2:12.00
1951	Sea Parrot	3	Gordon Richards	Noel Murless	Lieutenant-Colonel Giles Loder	2:11.80
1952	Hortentia	3	Doug Smith	George Colling	Lord Derby	2:12.20
1953	Happy Laughter	3	Bill Rickaby	Jack Jarvis	David Wills	2:19.20
1954	Key	3	Willie Snaith	Noel Murless	Mrs D M Fitzpatrick	2:16.80
1955	Reel In	3	Scobie Breasley	Noel Cannon	Lieutenant-Colonel Gerard Fairlie	2:10.00
1956	Dilettante	3	Doug Smith	Jack Watts	Lord Derby	2:13.20
1957	Swallowswift	3	Manny Mercer	George Colling	F G Robinson	2:12.00
1958	Darlene	3	Scobie Breasley	Sir Gordon Richards	Dorothy Paget	2:15.00
1959	Crystal Palace	3	Eph Smith	Ted Leader	Jim Joel	2:16.80
1960	Desert Beauty	3	Scobie Breasley	Sir Gordon Richards	Captain R V J Evans	2:17.60
1961	Rachel	3	Jimmy Lindley	Towser Gosden	E H Covell	2:18.40
1962	Nortia	3	Joe Mercer	Dick Hern	Major L B Holliday	2:09.80
1963	Spree	3	Jimmy Lindley	Jeremy Tree	J G Morrison	2:08.60
1964	Cracker	3	Joe Mercer	Walter Wharton	Major L B Holliday	2:15.60
1965	Aunt Edith	3	Lester Piggott	Noel Murless	Lieutenant-Colonel John Hornung	2:18.00
1966	Haymaking	3	Lester Piggott	Fulke Johnson Houghton	Clifford Nicholson	2:14.40
1967	Fair Winter	3	Joe Mercer	Derrick Candy	W Barnett	2:09.00
1968	Hill Shade	3	Sandy Barclay	Noel Murless	George A Pope jnr	2:09.60
1969	Lucyrowe	3	Frankie Durr	Peter Walwyn	Louis Freedman	2:07.20
1970	Pulchra	3	Geoff Lewis	Jack Sirett	B Hager	2:09.00
1971	Catherine Wheel	3	Geoff Lewis	Bruce Hobbs	T F Blackwell	2:09.49
1972	Crespinall	3	Ron Hutchinson	Richard Hannon Sr.	Mrs B Davis	2:10.74
1973	Cheveley Princess	3	Lester Piggott	Harry Wragg	Ralph Moller	2:07.91
1974	Mil's Bomb	3	Geoff Lewis	Noel Murless	Louis Freedman	2:07.44
1975	Roussalka	3	Lester Piggott	Henry Cecil	Nicky Phillips	2:09.13
1976	Roussalka	4	Lester Piggott	Henry Cecil	Nicky Phillips	2:12.07
1977	Triple First	3	Greville Starkey	Michael Stoute	R Clifford-Turner	2:07.88
1978	Cistus	3	Willie Carson	Dick Hern	Michael Sobell	2:08.67
1979	Connaught Bridge	3	Joe Mercer	Henry Cecil	H Barker	2:11.99
1980	Vielle	3	Geoff Baxter	Bruce Hobbs	Tom Blackwell	2:08.37
1981	Go Leasing	3	Greville Starkey	Guy Harwood	W. Norton	2:09.77
1982	Dancing Rocks	3	Pat Eddery	Harry Wragg	Philip Oppenheimer	2:07.07
1983	Acclimatise	3	Geoff Baxter	Bruce Hobbs	Jocelyn Hambro	2:08.76
1984	Optimistic Lass	3	Walter Swinburn	Michael Stoute	Sheikh Mohammed	2:11.94
1985	Free Guest	4	Pat Eddery	Luca Cumani	Fittocks Stud	2:14.11
1986	Park Express	3	John Reid	Jim Bolger	Paddy Burns	2:08.44
1987	Nom de Plume	3	Steve Cauthen	Henry Cecil	Sheikh Mohammed	2:07.08
1988	Ela Romara	3	Pat Eddery	Geoff Wragg	Exors of Eric Moller	2:10.36
1989	Mamaluna	3	Greville Starkey	Guy Harwood	Athos Christodoulou	2:06.88
1990	Kartajana	3	Walter Swinburn	Michael Stoute	HH Aga Khan IV	2:04.96
1991	Ruby Tiger	4	Richard Quinn	Paul Cole	Mrs Philip Blacker	2:08.71
1992	Ruby Tiger	5	Richard Quinn	Paul Cole	Mrs Philip Blacker	2:07.78
1993	Lyphard's Delta	3	Willie Ryan	Henry Cecil	Saud bin Khaled	2:11.93
1994	Hawajiss	3	Walter Swinburn	Michael Stoute	Maktoum Al Maktoum	2:06.17
1995	Caramba	3	Michael Roberts	Richard Hannon Sr.	7th Earl of Carnarvon	2:08.65
1996	Last Second	3	George Duffield	Mark Prescott	Faisal bin Salman	2:07.45
1997	Ryafan	3	Michael Hills	John Gosden	Khalid Abdullah	2:05.56
1998	Alborada	3	George Duffield	Sir Mark Prescott Bt	Kirsten Rausing	2:08.01
1999	Zahrat Dubai	3	Gary Stevens	Saeed bin Suroor	Godolphin	2:05.56
2000	Crimplene	3	Philip Robinson	Clive Brittain	Marwan Al Maktoum	2:05.30
2001	Lailani	3	Frankie Dettori	Ed Dunlop	Maktoum Al Maktoum	2:07.12
2002	Islington	3	Kieren Fallon	Sir Michael Stoute	Exors of Lord Weinstock	2:04.69
2003	Russian Rhythm	3	Kieren Fallon	Sir Michael Stoute	Cheveley Park Stud	2:04.80
2004	Favourable Terms	4	Kieren Fallon	Sir Michael Stoute	Maktoum Al Maktoum	2:05.70
2005	Alexander Goldrun	4	Kevin Manning	Jim Bolger	Miriam O'Callaghan	2:08.02
2006	Ouija Board	5	Frankie Dettori	Ed Dunlop	19th Earl of Derby	2:04.47
2007	Peeping Fawn	3	Johnny Murtagh	Aidan O'Brien	Tabor / Magnier	2:04.53
2008	Halfway to Heaven	3	Johnny Murtagh	Aidan O'Brien	Tabor / Smith / Magnier	2:09.73
2009	Midday	3	Tom Queally	Henry Cecil	Khalid Abdullah	2:09.42
2010	Midday	4	Tom Queally	Henry Cecil	Khalid Abdullah	2:07.25
2011	Midday	5	Tom Queally	Sir Henry Cecil	Khalid Abdullah	2:07.72
2012	The Fugue	4	Richard Hughes	John Gosden	Lord Lloyd-Webber	2:09.61
2013	Winsili	3	William Buick	John Gosden	Khalid Abdullah	2:06.19
2014	Sultanina	4	William Buick	John Gosden	Normandie Stud	2:06.58
2015	Legatissimo	3	Wayne Lordan	David Wachman	Magnier / Tabor / Smith	2:06.04
2016	Minding	3	Ryan Moore	Aidan O'Brien	Smith / Magnier / Tabor	2:05.05
2017	Winter	3	Ryan Moore	Aidan O'Brien	Magnier / Tabor / Smith	2:11.79
2018	Wild Illusion	3	William Buick	Charlie Appleby	Godolphin	2:06.22
2019	Deirdre	5	Oisin Murphy	Mitsuru Hashida	Toji Morita	2:02.93
2020	Fancy Blue	3	Ryan Moore	Donnacha O'Brien	Magnier / Tabor / Smith	2:04.99
2021	Lady Bowthorpe	5	Kieran Shoemark	William Jarvis	Emma Banks	2:08.94
2022	Nashwa	3	Hollie Doyle	John & Thady Gosden	Imad Alsagar	2:05.77
2023	Al Husn	4	Jim Crowley	Roger Varian	Shadwell Racing	2:13.37
2024	Opera Singer	3	Ryan Moore	Aidan O'Brien	Tabor / Smith / Magnier / Westerberg	2:04.96
2025 (Note: Flag start in the 2025 race due to lightning in the start area)	Whirl	3	Ryan Moore	Aidan O'Brien	Tabor / Smith / Magnier	2:08.43
2026	Diamond Necklace	3	Ryan Moore	Aidan O'Brien	Tabor / Smith / Magnier / Westerberg	2:04.40

== Earlier winners ==
- 1840: Rosa Bianca
- 1841: Scarf
- 1842: Dil-bar
- 1843: Mania
- 1844: All Round My Hat
- 1845: Refraction
- 1846: Princess Alice
- 1847: Clementina
- 1848: Canezou
- 1849: Clarissa
- 1850: Nutmeg
- 1851: Anspach
- 1852: Hirsuta
- 1853: Mayfair
- 1854: Virago
- 1855: Instructress
- 1856: Mincepie
- 1857: Beechnut
- 1858: Go-ahead
- 1859: Cantine
- 1860: Provision
- 1861: Pardalote
- 1862: Bertha
- 1863: Fantail
- 1864: Bradamante
- 1865: Peeress
- 1866: Hebe
- 1867: The Duchess
- 1868: Leonie
- 1869: Morna
- 1870: Agility
- 1871: Lady Atholstone
- 1872: Maid of Perth
- 1873: Albani
- 1874: Aventuriere
- 1875: Spinaway
- 1876: Zee
- 1877: Lady Golightly
- 1878: Eau de Vie
- 1879: Reconciliation
- 1880: Muriel
- 1881: Thebais
- 1882: St Marguerite
- 1883: Spectre
- 1884: Sandiway
- 1885: Armida
- 1886: Miss Jummy
- 1887: Maize
- 1888: Zanzibar
- 1889: Wrinkle
- 1890: Memoir
- 1891: Haute Saône
- 1892: La Fleche
- 1893: Harfleur II
- 1894: Throstle
- 1895: Butterfly
- 1896: Miss Fraser
- 1897: Perce Neige
- 1898: Chinook
- 1899: Saint Lundi

== See also ==
- Horse racing in Great Britain
- List of British flat horse races
