= Ellangowan (horse) =

British-bred Thoroughbred racehorse

- Sire: Lemberg
- Grandsire: Cyllene
- Dam: Lammermuir
- Damsire: Sunstar
- Sex: Stallion
- Foaled: 1920
- Country: United Kingdom
- Colour: Bay
- Breeder: Archibald Primrose, 5th Earl of Rosebery
- Owner: 5th Earl of Rosebery
- Trainer: Jack Jarvis
- Record: 9: 3-1-2
- Earnings: £14,885

Major wins
- 2000 Guineas (1923); St James's Palace Stakes (1923); Champion Stakes (1923)

Ellangowan (1920 – 1943) was a British Thoroughbred racehorse and sire. He raced only once as a two-year-old but showed considerable promise when finishing third in a top-class event at Kempton. In the following spring he came in third in the Craven Stakes before recording his biggest win in the 2000 Guineas. Although be made no impact in the Epsom Derby or the St Leger, he had further major victories in the St James's Palace Stakes and the Champion Stakes. He failed to win in 1924 and was retired to stud, but had little success as a breeding stallion.

== Background ==
Ellangowan was a bay horse bred and owned by Archibald Primrose, 5th Earl of Rosebery. During his racing career he was trained by Jack Jarvis at the Park Lodge at Newmarket, Suffolk. The colt was named after a location in Walter Scott's novel Guy Mannering.

He was one of the best horses sired by Lemberg, whose wins included the Epsom Derby, Eclipse Stakes and Champion Stakes. Lemberg also sired the Epsom Oaks winner Pogrom and was Champion sire in 1922. Ellangowan's dam Lammermuir also produced Lady Nairne, the dam of Colombo: she was a daughter of Montem, a broodmare whose other descendants included Sweet Solera, Aunt Edith and Blind Luck.

== Racing career ==
=== 1922: two-year-old season ===
On his only start as a juvenile in 1922 Ellangowan finished third behind Twelve Pointer and Brownhylda in the International Two-year-old Stakes at Kempton Park Racecourse.

=== 1923: three-year-old season ===
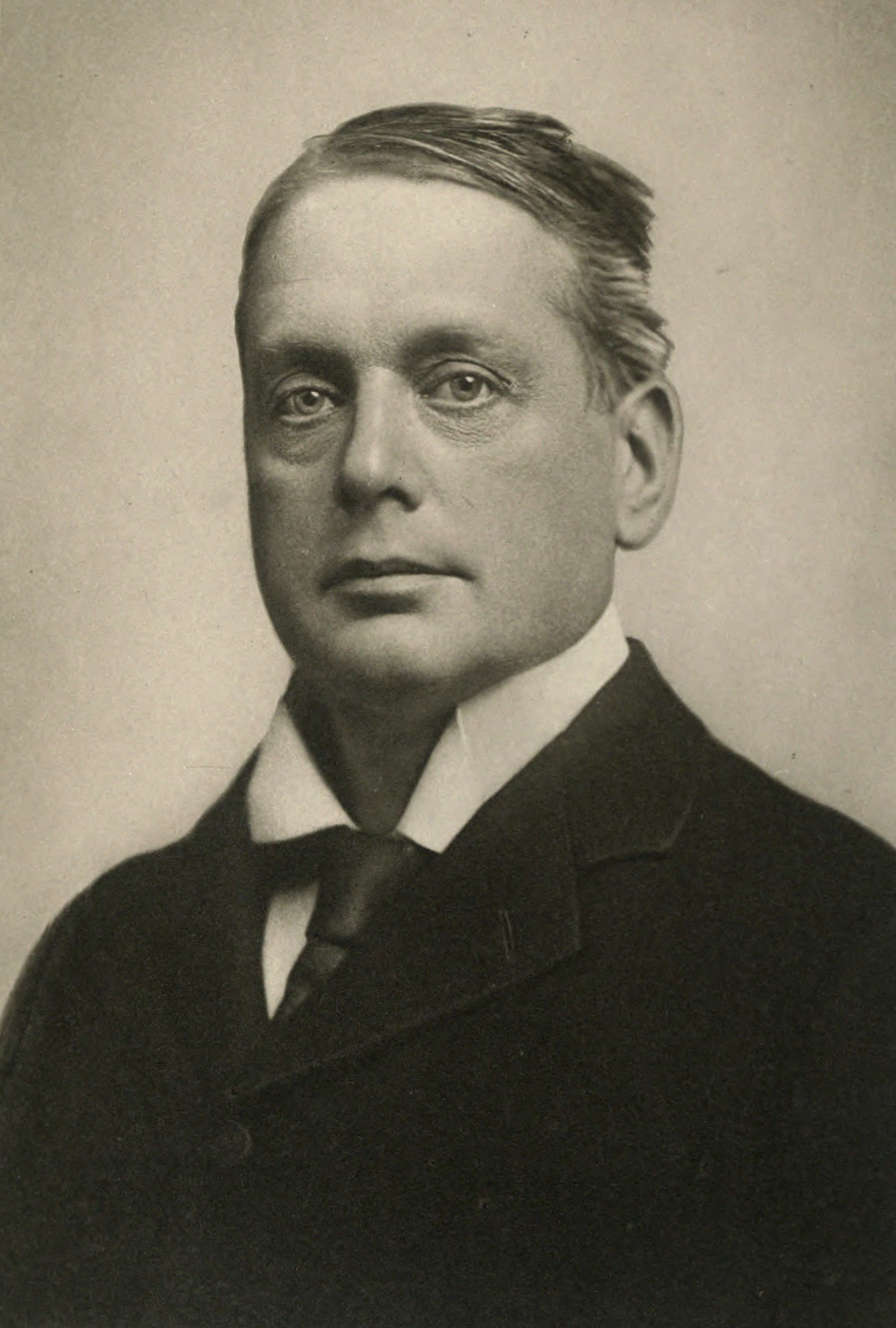
Ellangowan's owner Lord Rosebery

Ellangowan began his second season by running third behind Light Hand and Twelve Pointer in the Craven Stakes at Newmarket Racecourse in April. On 2 May 1923 Ellangowan, ridden by Charlie Elliott, started at odds of 7/1 in an eighteen-runner field for the 115th running of the 2000 Guineas over the Rowley Mile. Twelve Pointer started favourite, while the other fancied runners included Papyrus and Pharos. In a closely contested finish Ellangowan prevailed by a head from Knockando, with the 50/1 outsider D'Orsay half a length away in third place and Papyrus fourth. The colt's victory was reportedly greeted with "a great outburst of enthusiasm" by the crowd, possibly prompted by the popularity of his owner, who had been in very poor health. An unusual feature of the result was that the racecourse judge initially announced that Legality (carrying very similar colours to Knockando) had finished second and the mistake was not corrected until many bookmakers had paid out.

Ellangowan was well-fancied for the Epsom Derby but after tracking the leaders he dropped out of contention in the straight and finished eighth behind Papyrus. At Royal Ascot in June the colt was dropped back in distance for the St James's Palace Stakes and, with Elliott again in the saddle, won at odds of 3/1 from the favourite Chosroes. Ellangowan was entered in the St Leger at Doncaster Racecourse on 12 September but was not among the placed horses in a race won by the filly Tranquil In the Kingsclere Plate at Newbury seventeen days later the colt was beaten a length by Twelve Pointer, to whom he was conceding five pounds in weight. In October Ellangowan attempted to record his third major success of the year in the Champion Stakes over ten furlongs at Newmarket in which he started at odds of 11/4 in a four-runner field. After looking beaten in the last quarter mile he rallied strongly in the final furlong to win by a neck from Legality with Twelve Pointer a neck away in third.

Ellangowan ended the season with winnings of £14,885, making him the second most financially successful horse of 1923 in England.

=== 1924: four-year-old season ===
Ellangowan remained in training as a four-year-old but failed to win on his only start.

== Assessment and honours ==
In their book, A Century of Champions, based on the Timeform rating system, John Randall and Tony Morris rated Ellangowan an "inferior" winner of the 2000 Guineas.

== Stud record ==
At the end of his racing career Ellangowan was acquired by the partnership of Jack Javis, John Fox and Rowland Rank and was retired to become a breeding stallion. His most successful offspring included Tartan, who won the Britannia Stakes in 1933. Ellangowan was euthanised in September 1943.

== Pedigree ==
Pedigree of Ellangowan (GB), bay stallion, 1920
| Sire Lemberg (GB) 1907 | Cyllene (GB); 1895 | Bona Vista | Bend Or |
| Sire Lemberg (GB) 1907 | Cyllene (GB); 1895 | Bona Vista | Vista |
| Sire Lemberg (GB) 1907 | Cyllene (GB); 1895 | Arcadia | Isonomy |
| Sire Lemberg (GB) 1907 | Cyllene (GB); 1895 | Arcadia | Distant Shore |
| Sire Lemberg (GB) 1907 | Galicia (GB); 1898 | Galopin | Vedette |
| Sire Lemberg (GB) 1907 | Galicia (GB); 1898 | Galopin | Flying Duchess |
| Sire Lemberg (GB) 1907 | Galicia (GB); 1898 | Isoletta | Isonomy |
| Sire Lemberg (GB) 1907 | Galicia (GB); 1898 | Isoletta | Lady Muncaster |
| Dam Lammermuir (GB) 1914 | Sunstar (GB); 1908 | Sundridge | Amphion |
| Dam Lammermuir (GB) 1914 | Sunstar (GB); 1908 | Sundridge | Sierra |
| Dam Lammermuir (GB) 1914 | Sunstar (GB); 1908 | Doris | Loved One |
| Dam Lammermuir (GB) 1914 | Sunstar (GB); 1908 | Doris | Lauretta |
| Dam Lammermuir (GB) 1914 | Montem (GB); 1901 | Ladas | Hampton |
| Dam Lammermuir (GB) 1914 | Montem (GB); 1901 | Ladas | Illuminata |
| Dam Lammermuir (GB) 1914 | Montem (GB); 1901 | Kermesse | Cremorne |
| Dam Lammermuir (GB) 1914 | Montem (GB); 1901 | Kermesse | Hazledean (Family 11-f) |

- Ellangowan was inbred 4 × 4 to Isonomy, meaning that this stallion appears twice in the fourth generation of his pedigree.
