= Park Hill Stakes =

Flat horse race in Britain

- Class: Group 2
- Location: Doncaster Racecourse; Doncaster, England
- Inaugurated: 1839
- Race type: Flat / Thoroughbred
- Sponsor: Betfred
- Website: Doncaster

Race information
- Distance: 1m 6f 115y (2,922 m)
- Surface: Turf
- Track: Left-handed
- Qualification: Three-years-old and up fillies and mares
- Weight: 8 st 12 lb (3yo); 9 st 7 lb (4yo+); Penalties; 5 lb for Group 1 winners * 3 lb for Group 2 winners * * after 31 March
- Purse: £165,000 (2026); 1st: £93,572

Park Hill Stakes
2026
Waardah	Danielle	Consent

Previous years
2025
Santorini Star	Consent	Crepe Suzette
2024
Nakheel	Night Sparkle	Grateful
2023
Sumo Sam	One Evening	Lmay
2022
Mimikyu	Eshaada	Believe In Love
2021
Free Wind	Golden Pass	Yesyes

2020-2011
2020
Pista	Vivionn	Believe In Love
2019
Enbihaar	Delphinia	Vivid Diamond
2018
God Given	Horseplay	Pilaster
2017
Alyssa	Aljezeera	Melodic Motion
2016
Simple Verse	Pretty Perfect	California
2015
Gretchen	Melodious	Asyad
2014
Silk Sari	Groovejet	Criteria
2013
The Lark	Phiz	Alta Lilea
2012
Wild Coco	Hazel Lavery	Estimate
2011
Meeznah	Set To Music	Polly's Mark

2010-2001
2010
Eastern Aria	Rumoush	Meeznah
2009
The Miniver Rose	Starfala	Tanoura
2008
Allegretto	Perihelion	Hold Me Love Me
2007
Hi Calypso	All My Loving	Brisk Breeze
2006
Rising Cross	Anna Pavlova	Allegretto
2005
Sweet Stream	Kastoria	Songerie
2004
Echoes In Eternity	Mazuna	Bowstring
2003
Discreet Brief	Floreeda	Singleton
2002
Alexander Three	Treble Heights	Bright And Clear
2001
Ranin	Masilia	Jalousie

2000-1991
2000
Miletrian	Rada's Daughter	Ski Run
1999
Mistle Song	Credit-A-Plenty	Valentine Girl
1998
Delilah	Kadaka	On Call
1997
Book At Bedtime	The Faraway Tree	Puce
1996
Eva Luna	Time Allowed	Beauchamp Jade
1995
Noble Rose	Misbelief	Saxon Maid
1994
Coigach	Kithanga	Misbelief
1993
Anna Of Saxony	Lille Hammer	Spring
1992
Niodini	Guilty Secret	Anna Of Saxony
1991
Patricia	Nibbs Point	Sesame

1990-1988
1990
Madame Dubois	Applecross	Whitehaven
1989
Lucky Song	Princess Sobieska	Rubelite
1988
Casey	Banket	Bahamian

The Park Hill Stakes is a Group 2 flat horse race in Great Britain open to fillies and mares aged three years or older. It is run at Doncaster over a distance of 1 mile, 6 furlongs and 115 yards (2,922 metres), and it is scheduled to take place each year in September.

== History ==
The event is named after Park Hill, an estate formerly owned by Anthony St. Leger, the founder of Doncaster's most famous race, the St. Leger Stakes. The Park Hill Stakes was established in 1839, and it was originally restricted to three-year-old fillies.

The victory of Blink Bonny in 1857 provoked a riot among spectators who believed she had been dishonestly prevented from winning the previous day's St. Leger by her jockey John "Jack" Charlton. The incident came to be known as the "Blink Bonny riot".

The present system of race grading was introduced in 1971, and the Park Hill Stakes was initially given Group 2 status. It was opened to fillies and mares aged four years or older and relegated to Group 3 level in 1991. It was promoted back to Group 2 in 2004.

The Park Hill Stakes is currently held on the first day of Doncaster's four-day St. Leger Festival. It is sometimes referred to as the Fillies' St. Leger.

== Records ==
Most successful horse:

- no horse has won this race more than once

Leading jockey (7 wins):

- Frankie Dettori - Anna of Saxony (1993), Noble Rose (1995), Echoes in Eternity (2004), Eastern Aria (2010), Meeznah (2011), Free Wind (2021), Mimikyu (2022)

Leading trainer (7 wins):

- John Scott – Mickleton Maid (1839), Sally (1842), Peggy (1843), Canezou (1848), Honeysuckle (1854), Hepatica (1858), Toison d'Or (1869)
- Noel Murless – Bara Bibi (1954), Collyria (1959), Bracey Bridge (1965), Pink Gem (1967, dead-heat), Parmelia (1970), Attica Meli (1972), Mil's Bomb (1974)

== Winners since 1900 ==
Year	Winner	Age	Jockey	Trainer	Time
1900	Goosander	3	Lester Reiff	Samuel Pickering
1901	St Aldegonde	3	Mornington Cannon	John Porter	3:09.00
1902	Elba	3	Danny Maher	George Blackwell	3:12.40
1903	Quintessence	3		James Chandler
1904	Pretty Polly	3	William Lane	Peter Gilpin
1905	Adula	3	Bernard Dillon	Peter Gilpin
1906	Demure	3	Otto Madden	Jack Brewer
1907	Jubilee	3	Billy Higgs	Alec Taylor Jr.
1908	Siberia	3	Bernard Dillon	Peter Gilpin
1909	Electra	3	Bernard Dillon	Peter Gilpin
1910	Yellow Slave	3	Danny Maher	Samuel Pickering
1911	Hair Trigger II	3	Frank Wootton	George Lambton
1912	Eufrosina	3	Elijah Wheatley	Sam Darling	3:12.40
1913	Arda	3	Danny Maher	Basil Jarvis
1914	First Spear	3	Jim Clark	Alec Taylor Jr.
1915–18	no race
1919	Flying Spear	3	Joe Childs	Alec Taylor Jr.
1920	Redhead	3	George Colling	George Lambton
1921	Love In Idleness	3	Joe Childs	Alec Taylor Jr.	3:12.80
1922	Selene	3	Ted Gardner	George Lambton	3:22.40
1923	Brownhylda	3	Victor Smyth	Richard Dawson	3:11.20
1924	Charley's Mount	3	Victor Smyth	Richard Dawson	3:14.60
1925	Juldi	3	Bernard Carslake	Richard Dawson	3:06.80
1926	Glasheen	3	Joe Childs	Cecil Boyd-Rochfort	3:05.80
1927	Cinq A Sept	3	Joe Childs	Cecil Boyd-Rochfort	3:15.20
1928	Girandola	3	Joe Childs	Cecil Boyd-Rochfort	3:06.20
1929	Nuwara Eliya	3	Bobby Jones	Joseph Lawson	3:06.20
1930	Glorious Devon	3	Sir Gordon Richards	Tommy Hogg	3:15.00
1931	Volume	3	Freddy Lane	Joseph Lawson
1932	Fury	3	Billy Nevett	Matthew Peacock
1933	Typhonic	3	Sir Gordon Richards	Basil Jarvis	3:05.20
1934	Poker	3	George Bezant Jr.	Fred Pratt	3:06.60
1935	Fox Lair	3	Steve Donoghue	Len Cundell	3:23.80
1936	Traffic Light	3	Jack Sirett	Joseph Lawson	3:08.60
1937	Nadushka	3	Harry Wragg	Victor Gilpin	3:08.00
1938	Gainly	3	Michael Beary	Cecil Boyd-Rochfort	3:08.20
1939–40	no race
1941 ^{[a]}	Bright Lady	3	Hine	Vernell Hobbs	3:13.80
1942–45	no race
1946	Procne	3	Edgar Britt	Charles Elsey	3:16.40
1947	Mitrailleuse	3	Sir Gordon Richards	Jack Colling	3:07.60
1948	Vertencia	3	Michael Beary	Alfred Smyth	3:09.20
1949	Sea Idol	3	Eph Smith	Joseph Lawson	3:10.60
1950	La Baille	3	Charlie Smirke	Marcus Marsh	3:14.40
1951	Verse	3	Scobie Breasley	Noel Cannon	3:12.00
1952	Moon Star	3	Harry Carr	Cecil Boyd-Rochfort	3:09.80
1953	Kerkeb	3	Charlie Smirke	Marcus Marsh	3:07.80
1954	Bara Bibi	3	Charlie Smirke	Noel Murless	3:16.00
1955	Ark Royal	3	Manny Mercer	George Colling	3:11.60
1956	Kyak	3	Manny Mercer	George Colling	3:14.40
1957	Almeria	3	Harry Carr	Cecil Boyd-Rochfort	3:14.60
1958	Cutter	3	Manny Mercer	George Colling	3:08.00
1959	Collyria	3	Eph Smith	Noel Murless	3:13.40
1960	Sunny Cove	3	Scobie Breasley	Sir Gordon Richards	3:11.60
1961	Never Say	3	Joe Mercer	Jack Colling	3:15.60
1962	Almiranta	3	Harry Carr	John Waugh	3:17.60
1963	Outcrop	3	Eph Smith	Geoffrey Barling	3:10.40
1964	Cursorial	3	Joe Mercer	Walter Wharton	3:10.80
1965	Bracey Bridge	3	Lester Piggott	Noel Murless	3:27.80
1966	Parthian Glance	3	Lester Piggott	George Todd	3:16.80
1967 (dh)	Pia; Pink Gin	3; 3	Eddie Hide; George Moore	Bill Elsey; Noel Murless	3:17.80
1968	Bringley	3	Brian Taylor	Harvey Leader	3:29.60
1969	Aggravate	3	Ernie Johnson	Arthur Budgett	3:21.20
1970	Parmelia	3	Sandy Barclay	Noel Murless	3:13.80
1971	Example	3	Lester Piggott	Ian Balding	3:08.70
1972	Attica Meli	3	Geoff Lewis	Noel Murless	3:15.17
1973	Reload	3	Tony Murray	Harry Wragg	3:13.45
1974	Mil's Bomb	3	Geoff Lewis	Noel Murless	3:17.10
1975	May Hill	3	Pat Eddery	Peter Walwyn	3:08.72
1976	African Dancer	3	Tony Murray	Harry Wragg	3:11.43
1977	Royal Hive	3	Joe Mercer	Henry Cecil	3:15.67
1978	Idle Waters	3	John Reid	Fulke Johnson Houghton	3:09.91
1979	Quay Line	3	Philip Waldron	Henry Candy	3:08.52
1980	Shoot A Line	3	Willie Carson	Dick Hern	3:12.59
1981	Alma Ata	3	Tony Ives	Luca Cumani	3:11.43
1982	Swiftfoot	3	Willie Carson	Dick Hern	3:13.48
1983	High Hawk	3	Willie Carson	John Dunlop	3:08.91
1984	Borushka	3	Kevin Darley	Fulke Johnson Houghton	3:10.73
1985	I Want to Be	3	Lester Piggott	John Dunlop	3:04.61
1986	Rejuvenate	3	Brent Thomson	Barry Hills	3:06.64
1987	Trampship	3	Pat Eddery	Barry Hills	3:08.40
1988	Casey	3	Ray Cochrane	Luca Cumani	3:04.89
1989	Lucky Song	3	Steve Cauthen	Luca Cumani	3:09.72
1990	Madame Dubois	3	Steve Cauthen	Henry Cecil	3:10.61
1991	Patricia	3	Steve Cauthen	Henry Cecil	3:05.37
1992	Niodini	3	Paul Eddery	Michael Stoute	3:07.11
1993	Anna of Saxony	4	Frankie Dettori	John Gosden	3:11.63
1994	Coigach	3	Willie Ryan	Henry Cecil	3:03.89
1995	Noble Rose	4	Frankie Dettori	Luca Cumani	3:11.40
1996	Eva Luna	4	Pat Eddery	Henry Cecil	3:03.93
1997	Book at Bedtime	3	Michael Roberts	Charles Cyzer	3:02.44
1998	Delilah	4	Richard Quinn	Sir Michael Stoute	3:07.42
1999	Mistle Song	3	Richard Quinn	Clive Brittain	3:07.22
2000	Miletrian	3	Craig Williams	Mick Channon	3:04.87
2001	Ranin	3	Willie Supple	Ed Dunlop	3:10.17
2002	Alexander Three D	3	Michael Hills	Barry Hills	3:05.26
2003	Discreet Brief	3	Pat Eddery	John Dunlop	3:07.36
2004	Echoes in Eternity	4	Frankie Dettori	Saeed bin Suroor	3:05.82
2005	Sweet Stream	5	Thierry Gillet	John Hammond	3:03.89
2006 ^{[b]}	Rising Cross	3	Martin Dwyer	John Best	2:58.46
2007	Hi Calypso	3	Ryan Moore	Sir Michael Stoute	3:01.07
2008	Allegretto	5	Ryan Moore	Sir Michael Stoute	3:13.31
2009	The Miniver Rose	3	Pat Dobbs	Richard Hannon Sr.	3:02.81
2010	Eastern Aria	4	Frankie Dettori	Mark Johnston	3:02.00
2011	Meeznah	4	Frankie Dettori	David Lanigan	3:05.53
2012	Wild Coco	4	Tom Queally	Sir Henry Cecil	3:05.94
2013	The Lark	3	Jamie Spencer	Michael Bell	3:08.95
2014	Silk Sari	4	Andrea Atzeni	Luca Cumani	3:05.11
2015	Gretchen	3	Robert Havlin	John Gosden	3:06.46
2016	Simple Verse	4	Oisin Murphy	Ralph Beckett	3:06.08
2017	Alyssa	4	Pat Dobbs	Ralph Beckett	3:11.59
2018	God Given	4	Jamie Spencer	Luca Cumani	3:09.77
2019	Enbihaar	4	Jim Crowley	John Gosden	3:02.79
2020	Pista	3	William Buick	Joseph O'Brien	3:05.91
2021	Free Wind	3	Frankie Dettori	John and Thady Gosden	3:03.75
2022	Mimikyu	3	Frankie Dettori	John and Thady Gosden	3:05.71
2023	Sumo Sam	3	Rossa Ryan	Paul and Oliver Cole	3:09.90
2024	Nakheel	3	Jim Crowley	Owen Burrows	3:07.09
2025	Santorini Star	4	Tom Marquand	William Haggas	3:07.19
2026	Waardah	4	Callum Rodriguez	Owen Burrows	3:05.52

^{a} The 1941 running took place at Newmarket over 1 mile, 6 furlongs and 150 yards. ^{b} The 2006 running took place at York over 1 mile, 5 furlongs and 197 yards.

== Earlier winners ==
- 1839: Mickleton Maid
- 1840: Calypso
- 1841: Disclosure
- 1842: Sally
- 1843: Peggy
- 1844: Sorella
- 1845: Miss Sarah
- 1846: Ennui
- 1847: Ellerdale
- 1848: Canezou
- 1849: Lady Evelyn
- 1850: Tiff
- 1851: Aphrodite
- 1852: Bird on the Wing
- 1853: Mayfair
- 1854: Honeysuckle
- 1855: Clotilde
- 1856: Melissa
- 1857: Blink Bonny
- 1858: Hepatica
- 1859: Qui Vive
- 1860: Lady Trespass
- 1861: Brown Duchess
- 1862: Imperatrice
- 1863: Fantail
- 1864: Battaglia
- 1865: White Duck
- 1866: Lass o'Gowrie
- 1867: filly by Wild Dayrell
- 1868: Athena
- 1869: Toison d'Or
- 1870: Agility
- 1871: Hopbine
- 1872: Maid of Perth
- 1873: Marie Stuart
- 1874: Aventuriere
- 1875: Skotzka
- 1876: Twine the Plaiden
- 1877: Lady Golightly
- 1878: Jannette
- 1879: Peace
- 1880: Experiment
- 1881: Bal Gal
- 1882: Shotover
- 1883: Britomartis
- 1884: Belinda
- 1885: Hurry
- 1886: Miss Jummy
- 1887: Porcelain
- 1888: Belle Mahone
- 1889: Minthe
- 1890: Ponza
- 1891: Cereza
- 1892: Gantlet
- 1893: Self Sacrifice
- 1894: Amiable
- 1895: Bass
- 1896: Canterbury Pilgrim
- 1897: Galatia
- 1898: Lowood
- 1899: Irish Ivy

== See also ==
- Horse racing in Great Britain
- List of British flat horse races
