= Lemberg (horse) =

British Thoroughbred racehorse

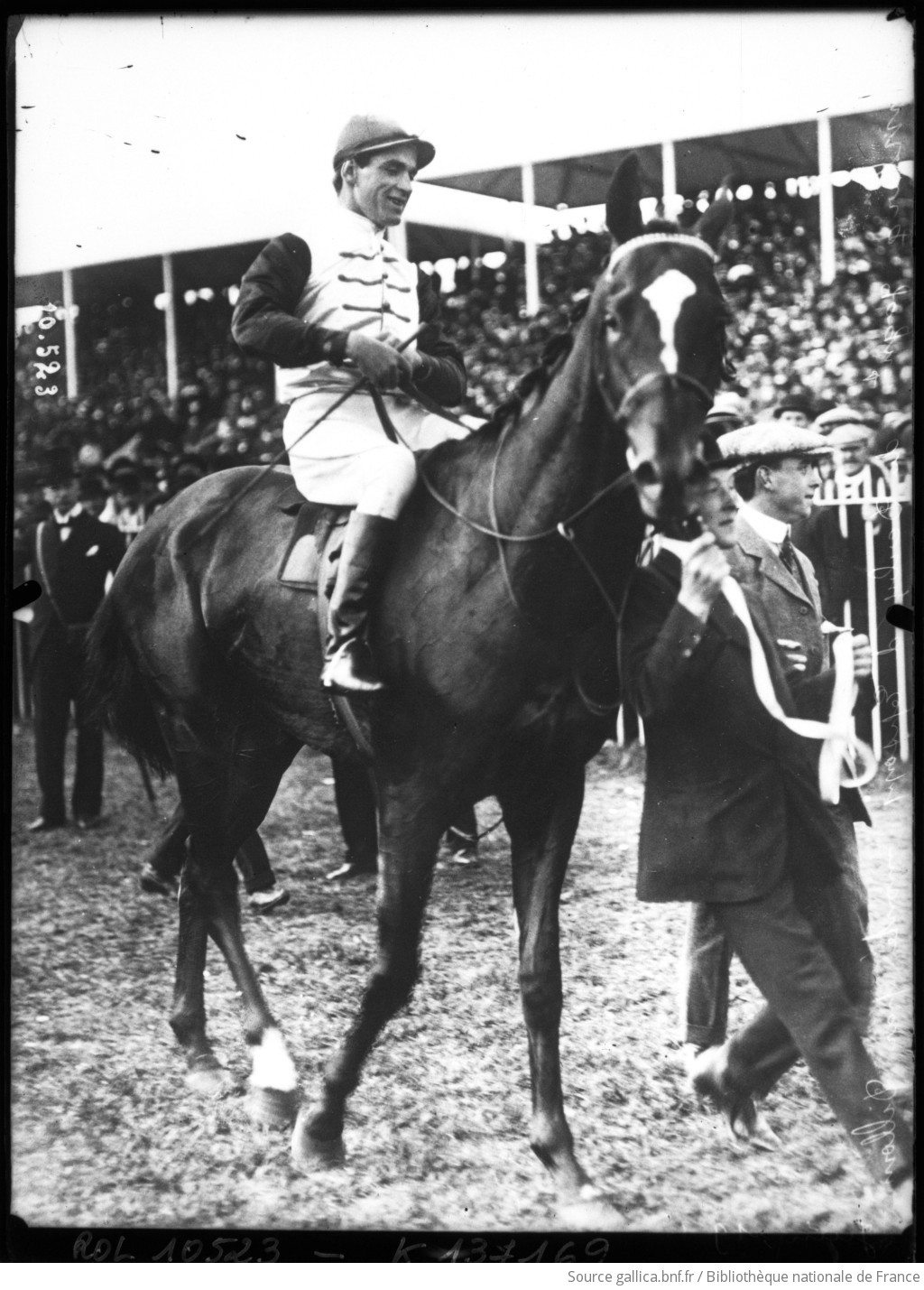
- June 1, 1910, at Epsom
- Sire: Cyllene
- Grandsire: Bona Vista
- Dam: Galicia
- Damsire: Galopin
- Sex: Stallion
- Foaled: 1907
- Country: United Kingdom of Great Britain and Ireland
- Colour: Bay
- Breeder: Alfred W. Cox ("Mr. Fairie")
- Owner: Alfred W. Cox
- Trainer: Alec Taylor, Jr.
- Record: 24: 17-4-2

Major wins
- Norfolk Stakes (1909); Middle Park Stakes (1909); Dewhurst Stakes (1909); Epsom Derby (1910); St. James's Palace Stakes (1910); Eclipse Stakes (1910); Jockey Club Stakes (1910); Champion Stakes (1910, 1911); Coronation Cup (1911); Doncaster Cup (1911)

Lemberg (1907–1928) was a British Thoroughbred racehorse and sire. He won seventeen times in a career that lasted from 1909 until 1911, taking major races at two, three and four years of age. Lemberg won his most important victory as a three-year-old in 1910 when he won The Derby. His career was marked by his rivalries, first with the fast and precocious Neil Gow and later with the outstanding middle-distance runner Swynford. Lemberg went on to have a successful career at stud.

== Background ==
Lemberg was bred by his owner Alfred W. Cox who raced his horses under the name of "Mr. Fairie". He was sired by Cyllene, an Ascot Gold Cup winner, who went on to become a highly successful stallion. In addition to Lemberg, he sired three other winners of The Derby and through his grandson, Phalaris, he is the direct male-line ancestor of most modern thoroughbreds. Lemberg's dam, Galicia was an outstanding broodmare. In the year before Lemberg's birth she produced Bayardo, the best British horse of his era, and later produced Kwang-Su, who finished second in the Derby.

Lemberg was one of sixteen Classic winners trained by Alec Taylor, Jr. at Manton in Wiltshire.

== Racing career ==
=== 1909: two-year-old season ===
Lemberg was one of the two best British two-year-old of his generation. After running impressively in a private trial he was sent to Royal Ascot where he started favourite for the New Stakes and won by one and a half lengths. Lemberg followed with odds-on victories the Chesterfield Stakes at Newmarket and the Rous memorial Stakes at Goodwood before being sent to Doncaster for the Champagne Stakes in September. He again started odds-on but finished third of the four runners behind Neil Gow.

He returned to his best form in autumn at Newmarket, winning another Rous Memorial Stakes over five furlongs by a neck from the filly Yellow Slave, to whom he was giving seven pounds. At the same course he then took the Middle Park Stakes giving three pounds to the future American champion Whisk Broom and winning by a neck. At the same course two weeks later he again defeated Whisk Broom, this time by five lengths, in the Dewhurst Stakes, and went into the winter break as favourite for the following season's classics.

=== 1910: three-year-old season ===
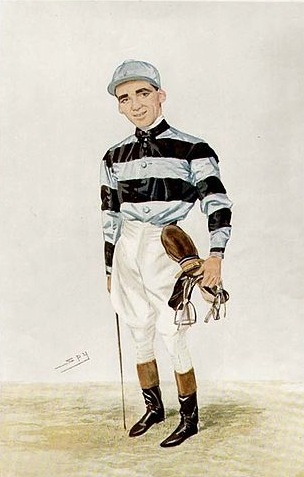
Bernard Dillon who rode Lemberg to his Derby win

Before the season began, there was much speculation concerning the riding plans of the jockey Danny Maher. According to reports in the Telegraph he was offered £3,000 to partner Lemberg, with a rival offer of £5,000 if he was successful in the Derby on Neil Gow. He eventually decided to ride Neil Gow, although he rode Lemberg in later races.

Lemberg began his three-year-old season by running in the 2000 Guineas. He started 7/2 second favourite and was beaten a short-head by Neil Gow in a "superlative" driving finish. Although he been beaten by Neil Gow on both their meetings, Lemberg looked to be the better potential stayer, and was the more fancied for the Derby. At Epsom he started 7/4 favourite in front of a crowd estimated at 250,000, many dressed in black as a mark of respect to the recently deceased King Edward VII. Ridden by Bernard Dillon he tracked the leader, Greenback, throughout the race before taking the lead in the closing stages and winning by a neck in a race record time of 2:35.2. Neil Gow became agitated and gave trouble at the start before finishing fourth. Among the unplaced horses was Lord Derby's Swynford, making his first start of the year.

Lemberg beat a supposedly "moderate lot" by three lengths to win the St James's Palace Stakes at Royal Ascot, with Swynford, among the beaten horses. Lemberg then started favourite for the Grand Prix de Paris at Longchamp. He led the field into the straight before tiring on the heavy ground and finishing fourth to Nuage. At Sandown in July he faced Neil Gow in a much anticipated race for the Eclipse Stakes, then the most valuable race in England with a prize of £10,000. The two colts dominated the race and contested the finish "tooth and nail" before finishing in a dead-heat.

Lemberg was reported to be working poorly before the St Leger and finished third, beaten a head and one and a half lengths by Swynford and Bronzino. Danny Maher, who rode Lemberg on this occasion, was felt by some to have ridden a poor race.

In autumn he added the Jockey Club Stakes scoring an easy win from Dibs and seven others, and then beat the prolific handicap winner Dean Swift in the Champion Stakes. Lemberg started twice more before the end of the season, winning the Lowther Stakes over one and three quarter miles at Newmarket and the Sandown Foal Stakes: on each occasion he started odds-on and won easily, giving weight to inferior opposition.

=== 1911: four-year-old season ===
As a four-year-old Lemberg produced his best form on his debut, when he reversed the St Leger form with Swynford by winning the Coronation Cup at Epsom. He then started odds-on favourite, but was beaten by Swynford in the Princess of Wales's Stakes at Newmarket, when attempting to give five pounds to his rival. Before the Newmarket race "Mr Fairie" had estimated Lemberg's value at least £40,000, saying that the colt could win at least that figure on the racecourse. He was later reported to have turned down an offer of £55,000. In the Eclipse Stakes, however, Swynford proved his superiority over Lemberg at level weights, winning by five lengths.

Lemberg returned in the autumn and successfully moved up in distance to win the Doncaster Cup over two and a quarter miles. He was then asked to give two stones in weight to the top-class three-year-old Stedfast in the Jockey Club Stakes at Newmarket and finished second, beaten four lengths. Late in the year he won the Champion Stakes for the second time in anticlimactic fashion; he was allowed a walkover when no other horses opposed him. On his final start Lemberg won the Lowther Stakes again, easily beating his one moderate rival.

== Assessment ==
In their book A Century of Champions, John Randall and Tony Morris rated Lemberg a "superior" Derby winner and the seventy-sixth best British racehorse of the 20th Century .

== Stud career ==
Retired to the Hamilton Stud at Newmarket, Lemberg became a successful stallion and was Britain's Champion sire in 1922. Among his best progeny were the Classic winners Pogrom, Ellangowan and Taj Mah. Lemberg died at the age of twenty-one in 1928.

== Pedigree ==
Pedigree of Lemberg (GB), bay stallion, 1907
Sire Cyllene (GB) 1895	Bona Vista; 1889	Bend Or	Doncaster
Sire Cyllene (GB) 1895	Bona Vista; 1889	Bend Or	Rouge Rose
Sire Cyllene (GB) 1895	Bona Vista; 1889	Vista	Macaroni
Sire Cyllene (GB) 1895	Bona Vista; 1889	Vista	Verdure
Sire Cyllene (GB) 1895	Arcadia; 1887	Isonomy*	Sterling
Sire Cyllene (GB) 1895	Arcadia; 1887	Isonomy*	Isola Bella
Sire Cyllene (GB) 1895	Arcadia; 1887	Distant Shore	Hermit
Sire Cyllene (GB) 1895	Arcadia; 1887	Distant Shore	Lands End
Dam Galicia (GB) 1898	Galopin; 1872	Vedette	Voltigeur
Dam Galicia (GB) 1898	Galopin; 1872	Vedette	Mrs Ridgway
Dam Galicia (GB) 1898	Galopin; 1872	Flying Duchess	The Flying Dutchman
Dam Galicia (GB) 1898	Galopin; 1872	Flying Duchess	Merope
Dam Galicia (GB) 1898	Isoletta; 1891	Isonomy*	Sterling
Dam Galicia (GB) 1898	Isoletta; 1891	Isonomy*	Isola Bella
Dam Galicia (GB) 1898	Isoletta; 1891	Lady Muncaster	Muncaster
Dam Galicia (GB) 1898	Isoletta; 1891	Lady Muncaster	Blue Light (Family: 10-a)

- Lemberg was inbred 3 × 3 to Isonomy. This means that the stallion appears twice in the third generation of his pedigree.
