= Pogrom (horse) =

British Thoroughbred racehorse

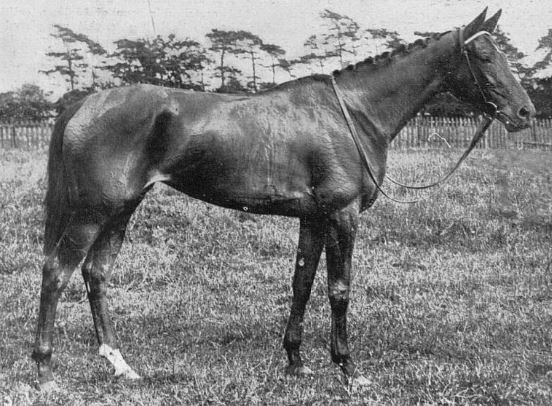
- Pogrom in 1922.
- Sire: Lemberg
- Grandsire: Cyllene
- Dam: Popingaol
- Damsire: Dark Ronald
- Sex: Mare
- Foaled: 1919
- Country: United Kingdom
- Colour: Bay
- Breeder: Waldorf Astor, 2nd Viscount Astor
- Owner: Lord Astor
- Trainer: Alec Taylor, Jr.
- Record: 12: 7-4-0

Major wins
- Epsom Oaks (1922); Coronation Stakes (1922); Newmarket Oaks (1922)

Pogrom (1919 – 1933) was a British Thoroughbred racehorse and broodmare. As a two-year-old in 1921 she showed considerable promise by winning four of her six starts. In the following year she was one of the best fillies of her generation as she won the Epsom Oaks, Coronation Stakes and Newmarket Oaks and finished second on three other occasions. She made very little impact as a broodmare and died in 1933.

== Background ==
Pogrom was a bay mare bred in the United Kingdom by her owner Waldorf Astor, 2nd Viscount Astor. She was sent into training with Alec Taylor, Jr. at his stable at Manton, Wiltshire.

She was one of the best horses sired by Lemberg, whose wins included the Epsom Derby, Eclipse Stakes and Champion Stakes. Pogrom's performances helped Lemberg to become Britain’s Champion sire in 1922. Her dam Popingaol won two minor races but became a very successful broodmare whose other foals included Book Law (St Leger), Splendid Jay (Yorkshire Oaks), Book Debt (dam of Pay Up) and Fair Cop (female-line ancestor of Provoke).

== Racing career ==
=== 1921: two-year-old season ===
As a two-year-old in 1921, Pogrom won four times from six races. Her victories came in the Astley Stakes at Lewes, the Michaelmas Plate at Manchester, the Buckenham Stakes at Newmarket and the Great Sapling Stakes at Sandown Park. She also finished second to the colt Sicyon in the Prendergast Stakes at Newmarket in mid-October.

=== 1922: three-year-old season ===
Pogrom began her second season by finishing second in the Lingfield Oaks in May. On 2 June at Epsom Racecourse, Pogrom was one of eleven fillies to contest the 144th running Oaks Stakes over one and a half miles the 5/4 favourite ahead of Soubriquet and Silver Urn, respectively second and first in the 1000 Guineas. Ridden by Ted Gardner, he raced in third place before taking the lead in the straight and winning "very comfortably" by three quarters of a length from Soubriquet with three lengths back to Mysia in third.

Pogrom was dropped back in distance for the Coronation Stakes at Royal Ascot on 14 June in which she was ridden by the Australian jockey Bernard "Brownie" Carslake and won at odds of 2/1. In early July she ran well in defeat when assigned a weight of 133 pounds for the Sandringahm Stakes at Sandown Park, coming home two lengths second to a colt named Prestongrange, who was carrying 18 pounds less. She was then scheduled to run in the Nassau Stakes at Goodwood Racecourse but was withdrawn on the day of the race after being found to be "slightly amiss".

After a two-month break, Pogrom was stepped up in trip for the fourteen furlong Newmarket Oaks and finished in a dead heat with Abe Bailey's filly Bessema, to whom she was conceding 17 pounds in weight. Shortly afterwards she reappeared at Lingfield Park but was beaten by her stablemate Leighton Tor. By the end of the season, Pogrom had earned £11,747, making her the fourth biggest prize money winner in Britain that year behind Royal Lancer, Golden Myth and Captain Cuttle.

== Assessment and honours ==
In their book, A Century of Champions, based on the Timeform rating system, John Randall and Tony Morris rated Pogrom an "average" winner of the Oaks.

Press reports stated the British three-year-old fillies of 1922 were regarded as an exceptionally strong crop, and that Pogrom was probably the best of them.

== Breeding record ==
At the end of her racing career Pogrom was retired to become a broodmare. She proved difficult to breed from and produced very few foals before being euthanised in 1933. One foal, a chestnut colt named Scatter (foaled 1925, by Hurry On) became a successful breeding stallion in Jamaica.

== Pedigree ==
Pedigree of Pogrom (GB), bay mare, 1919
Sire Lemberg (GB) 1907	Cyllene (GB); 1895	Bona Vista	Bend Or
Sire Lemberg (GB) 1907	Cyllene (GB); 1895	Bona Vista	Vista
Sire Lemberg (GB) 1907	Cyllene (GB); 1895	Arcadia	Isonomy
Sire Lemberg (GB) 1907	Cyllene (GB); 1895	Arcadia	Distant Shore
Sire Lemberg (GB) 1907	Galicia (GB); 1898	Galopin	Vedette
Sire Lemberg (GB) 1907	Galicia (GB); 1898	Galopin	Flying Duchess
Sire Lemberg (GB) 1907	Galicia (GB); 1898	Isoletta	Isonomy
Sire Lemberg (GB) 1907	Galicia (GB); 1898	Isoletta	Lady Muncaster
Dam Popingaol (GB) 1913	Dark Ronald (IRE); 1905	Bay Ronald (GB)	Hampton
Dam Popingaol (GB) 1913	Dark Ronald (IRE); 1905	Bay Ronald (GB)	Black Duchess
Dam Popingaol (GB) 1913	Dark Ronald (IRE); 1905	Darkie (GB)	Thurio
Dam Popingaol (GB) 1913	Dark Ronald (IRE); 1905	Darkie (GB)	Insignia
Dam Popingaol (GB) 1913	Popinjay (GB); 1905	St Frusquin	St Simon
Dam Popingaol (GB) 1913	Popinjay (GB); 1905	St Frusquin	Isabel
Dam Popingaol (GB) 1913	Popinjay (GB); 1905	Chelandry	Goldfinch
Dam Popingaol (GB) 1913	Popinjay (GB); 1905	Chelandry	Illuminata (Family 1-n)

- Pogrom was inbred 4 × 4 to Isonomy, meaning that this stallion appears twice in the fourth generation of her pedigree.
