= Waldorf Astor, 2nd Viscount Astor =

American-born English politician

The Right Honourable The Viscount Astor DL
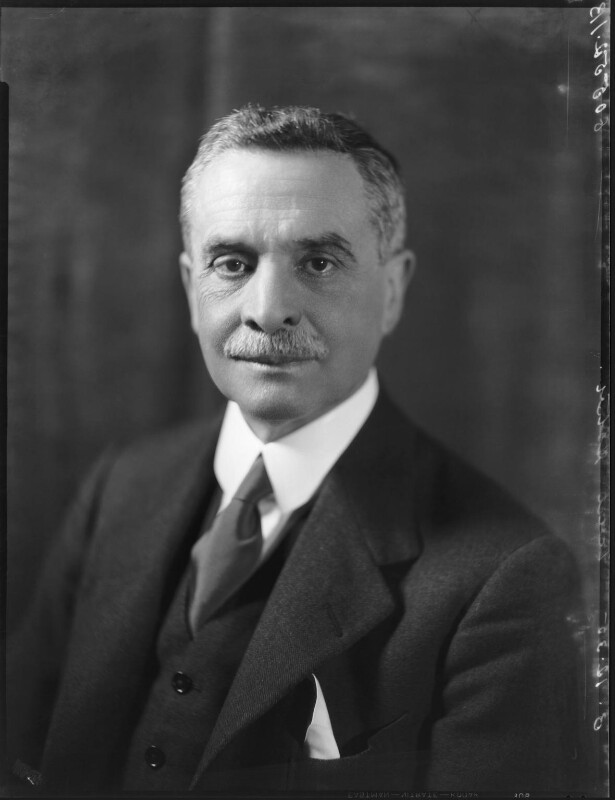

Parliamentary Secretary to the Ministry of Health
- In office 24 June 1919 – 7 April 1921
- Monarch: George V
- Prime Minister: David Lloyd George
- Preceded by: office established
- Succeeded by: Richard Onslow, 5th Earl of Onslow

Parliamentary Secretary to the Local Government Board
- In office 27 January 1919 – 24 June 1919
- Monarch: George V
- Prime Minister: David Lloyd George
- Preceded by: Stephen Walsh
- Succeeded by: office abolished

Parliamentary Secretary to the Ministry of Food Control
- In office 18 July 1918 – 27 January 1919
- Monarch: George V
- Prime Minister: David Lloyd George
- Preceded by: J. R. Clynes
- Succeeded by: Charles McCurdy

Member of the House of Lords Lord Temporal
- In office 18 October 1919 – 30 September 1952; Hereditary Peerage
- Preceded by: William Waldorf Astor
- Succeeded by: William Waldorf Astor II

Member of Parliament for Plymouth Sutton
- In office 14 December 1918 – 18 October 1919
- Preceded by: Constituency Created
- Succeeded by: Nancy Astor

Member of Parliament for Plymouth
- In office 19 December 1910 – 25 November 1918 Serving with Arthur Benn
- Preceded by: Charles Edward Mallet and Aneurin Williams
- Succeeded by: Constituency Abolished

Personal details
- Born: Waldorf Astor; 19 May 1879 New York City, U.S.
- Died: 30 September 1952 (aged 73) Taplow, Buckinghamshire, England
- Party: Conservative
- Spouse: Nancy Witcher Langhorne (m. 1906)
- Children: William Waldorf Astor II; Nancy Phyllis Louise Astor; Francis David Langhorne Astor; Michael Langhorne Astor; John Jacob Astor VII
- Parents: William Waldorf Astor; Mary Dahlgren Paul
- Relatives: Astor family
- Education: Eton College; New College, Oxford

Waldorf Astor, 2nd Viscount Astor, DL (19 May 1879 – 30 September 1952) was an American-born English politician and newspaper proprietor. He was a member of the Astor family. He was active in minor political roles. He was devoted to charitable projects, and with his wife Nancy Astor became a prominent fixture in upper class English society.

== Early life ==
Astor was born in New York City. He was the eldest son of William Waldorf Astor, 1st Viscount Astor, and Mary Dahlgren Paul. His younger brothers were John Rudolph Astor (who died young) and John Jacob Astor V, Baron Astor of Hever. He spent much of his life travelling and living in Europe before his family settled in England in 1889. There Waldorf attended Eton College and New College, Oxford, where he excelled as a sportsman, earning accolades for both fencing and polo. For the Oxford University Polo Club he played side on side with Devereux Milburn in successive Varsity Matches, winning by a margin of 14 goals on both occasions.

== Marriage and children ==
In 1905, while a passenger on an Atlantic voyage returning to Britain, Astor met Nancy Langhorne Shaw, a divorced woman with a young son (Robert Gould Shaw III). Coincidentally, both he and Mrs Shaw shared the same birthdate, 19 May 1879, and both were American. After a rapid courtship, the two married in May 1906. As a wedding gift, Waldorf's father gave him and his bride the Sancy diamond and the family estate at Cliveden, which Nancy redecorated and modernised with the installation of electricity.

- William Waldorf Astor II, 3rd Viscount Astor (13 August 1907 — 7 March 1966)
- Nancy Phyllis Louise Astor, Countess of Ancaster (22 March 1909 — 2 March 1975)
- Francis David Langhorne Astor (5 March 1912 — 6 December 2001)
- Michael Langhorne Astor (10 April 1916 — 26 February 1980)
- Major Sir John Jacob "Jakie" Astor VII (29 August 1918 — 10 September 2000)

Through his wife Astor developed an interest in social reform.

== Public career ==
Nancy also encouraged her husband to launch a career in politics. Though defeated in an initial attempt to win election to the House of Commons in the January 1910 general election, Astor won election as a Unionist for the borough of Plymouth in the December 1910 general election. He held the seat until the constituency was abolished in 1918, after which he moved to the borough of Plymouth Sutton. Despite his political affiliation, Astor quickly demonstrated his independence by his support for the so-called "People's Budget" and the National Insurance Act 1911.

In 1911, Astor was approached by James Louis Garvin, the editor of The Observer, about purchasing the newspaper from its owner, the press baron Lord Northcliffe. Northcliffe and Garvin had a disagreement over the issue of Imperial Preference, and Northcliffe had given Garvin the option of finding a buyer for the paper. Astor convinced his father to purchase the paper, which William did on the condition that Garvin also agree to edit the Pall Mall Gazette, which was also a property of the Astor family. Though his father provided the funds, it was Waldorf who was in charge of the paper, and he developed a harmonious working relationship with Garvin. William formally turned over ownership of both papers to his son in 1915, who promptly sold the Pall Mall Gazette but retained ownership of The Observer.

Following the outbreak of the First World War, Astor joined the Army. Having been diagnosed with a bad heart, Astor was unable to serve in combat and instead fought waste and inefficiency in munitions production. He was appointed an Inspector of Administrative Services, with the temporary rank of major, on 20 October 1914, serving until January 1917, when he resigned his commission and was granted the honorary rank of major. When his friend David Lloyd George became prime minister and formed a new coalition government, Astor became his parliamentary private secretary. In 1918 he served as Parliamentary Secretary to the Ministry of Food and from 1919 until 1921 he served as Parliamentary Secretary to the Ministry of Health while also playing a prominent role as a member of Lloyd George's "garden suburb" of advisers.

In 1916, father William Waldorf Astor was elevated to the peerage as Viscount Astor. Upon the death of his father in October 1919, Waldorf Astor succeeded to the viscountcy and became the 2nd Viscount Astor despite Waldorf's attempts to disclaim the title. Now a member of the House of Lords, Astor was forced to forfeit his seat in the House of Commons, though he remained active in the government. The seat was won subsequently in a by-election by Astor's wife Nancy, who became the second woman elected to the House of Commons and the first woman to take her seat in the House, after the first woman elected, Constance Markievicz, had declined in accordance with her (Sinn Féin) party's policy. Nancy retained the seat until she stepped down in the 1945 general election.

== Later years ==
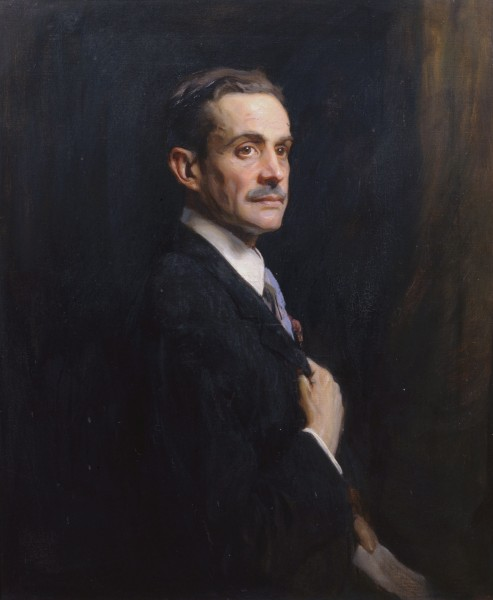
Portrait of Lord Astor, by Philip de László, 1924

With his political career eclipsed by that of his wife, Waldorf turned to greater involvement in charitable causes. He became governor of the Peabody Trust and Guy's Hospital, while his interest in international relations fuelled his involvement with the Royal Institute of International Affairs, and he served as its chairman from 1935 to 1949. He was also a considerable benefactor to the city of Plymouth, and served as its Lord Mayor from 1939 to 1944. He was appointed Honorary Colonel of the Devonport, Plymouth-based Devonshire Heavy Brigade, Royal Artillery of the Territorial Army on 5 April 1929.

Astor first got involved in horseracing, whilst an undergraduate, when he purchased a filly called Conjure for 100 guineas. He later bought two other fillies/mares called Maid of the Mist and Popinjay and these three became the foundation mares of Astor's Cliveden Stud that he established near to his home. He became a successful owner-breeder and in all won 11 Classic races. These were; Two Thousand Guineas Stakes:- Craig an Eran (1921), Pay Up (1936) and Court Martial (1945); One Thousand Guineas Stakes:- Winkipop (1910) and Saucy Sue (1925); Oaks Stakes:- Sunny Jane (1917), Pogrom (1922), Saucy Sue (1925), Short Story (1926) and Pennycomequick (1929); and St Leger Stakes:- Book Law (1927). He famously never won the Derby but had the second placed horse 5 times. In addition to these successes he had 4 winners of the Eclipse Stakes, 3 winners of the St. James's Palace Stakes and 2 winners of the Champion Stakes. To this day he still holds the record for the number of winners (7) of Royal Ascot's important Coronation Stakes. He bred all of these horses and they all emanated from his three foundation mares.

In 1950, in poor health, he decided to withdraw from racing. He handed over his stud to his eldest son William and divided his bloodstock between William and his youngest son Jakie (John Jacob). The two brothers tossed a coin and then took alternate choices of the thoroughbred stock. The eldest son continued using his racing colours of pale blue and pink and Jakie's colours were a variation on this.

During the military buildup in Germany in the 1930s, the Astors promoted entente with Germany, seen by critics as appeasement of Hitler. Many of their associates felt sympathy for the state of Germany after World War I, feared Communism, and supported the position of the British government. Astor had antisemitic views and in the 1930s he told Thomas Jones that Germany was criticised because, "Newspapers are influenced by those firms which advertise so largely in the press and are frequently under Jewish control."

In 1940, they urged Neville Chamberlain to resign and supported Churchill as replacement. He also supported war against Germany when it came although both remained uncomfortable with Joseph Stalin as an ally (from 1941). His son David Astor, who became owner and editor of The Observer in 1948, never forgave Claud Cockburn and his newssheet The Week for attacks on the "Cliveden Set".

The Astor family donated Cliveden Estate in Buckinghamshire to the National Trust in 1942.

Viscount Astor died on 30 September 1952 at Cliveden near Taplow, England, and was buried in the Octagon Temple at Cliveden. His eldest son Bill succeeded him as Viscount.

== Arms ==
Coat of arms of Waldorf Astor, 2nd Viscount Astor
Coronet A Coronet of a Viscount Crest From a Mount Vert a Falcon rising proper ensigned by three Mullets Gold Escutcheon Or, a falcon resting on a dexter hand couped at the wrist proper and gauntleted gules in chief two fleurs-de-lys of the last Supporters Dexter: a North American Indian; Sinister: a North American fur trapper; each habited accoutred and holding in the exterior hand a Rifle all proper Motto Ad Astra (To the stars)

Parliament of the United Kingdom
Preceded by Charles Mallet and Aneurin Williams	Member of Parliament for Plymouth; 1910–1918; With: Arthur Benn	Constituency divided
New constituency	Member of Parliament for Plymouth Sutton; 1918–1919	Succeeded by Viscountess Astor
Peerage of the United Kingdom
Preceded by William Waldorf Astor	Viscount Astor; 1919–1952	Succeeded by William Astor
