= Alec Taylor Jr. =

British horse trainer

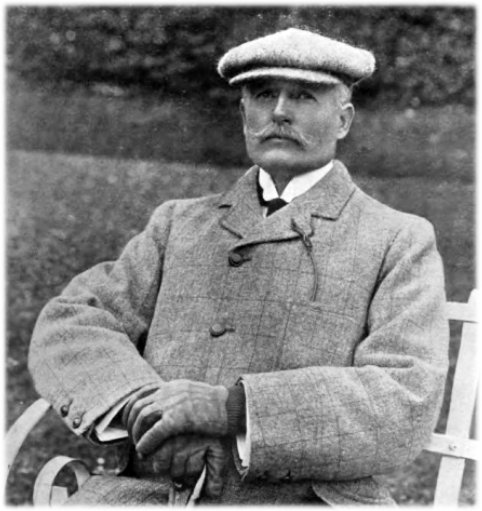

Personal information
- Born: 1862 United Kingdom
- Died: 1943 (aged 80–81)
- Occupation: Trainer

Horse racing career
- Sport: Horse racing

Major racing wins
- British Classic Race wins as trainer: 2000 Guineas (4); 1000 Guineas (1); Epsom Derby (3); Epsom Oaks (8); St Leger (5)

Racing awards
- British flat racing Champion Trainer (1907, 1909, 1910, 1914, 1917, 1918, 1919, 1920, 1921, 1922, 1923, 1925)

Significant horses
- Bayardo, Lemberg, Gainsborough, Gay Crusader, Saucy Sue

Alec Taylor Jr. (1862–1943), known as the Wizard of Manton, was a British Thoroughbred racehorse trainer who followed in the footsteps of his highly successful father, Alec Taylor Sr.

== Family ==
His father, Alec Taylor Sr., was a successful horse trainer, running Manton stables, "one of the finest training centres", which he built at Manton, Wiltshire, on the downs west of Marlborough. He began winning in 1851 with the Aphrodite in the One Thousand Guineas and Teddington in the Derby. He won 12 classics, ending in 1887 with Reve d'Or at the Oaks and One Thousand Guineas. Thomas Taylor, his grandfather, had also been a trainer to Lord Chesterfield.

== Career ==
After Taylor's father died in 1894, he shared responsibility for running Manton stables with Tom, his half-brother, from 1895; (Note: The "History of Manton" web page stated that his brother Tom ran the stables until 1902, not indicating that they shared responsibility until 1902. Nicholson, in his book, stated that the brothers co-inherited the stables in 1895.) Tom managed the business and Alec trained the horses.

During their shared management of the stables, a 15-year-old boy who worked at the stables was hospitalised and died of tubercular meningitis. Severe bruises found on his legs led to an investigation, supported by the National Society for the Prevention of Cruelty to Children, which resulted in the discovery of more individuals who were reportedly beaten by two foremen and Tom Taylor. The foremen was found guilty of assault and Tom Taylor was acquitted due to the Master and Servant Act that allowed for corporal discipline and insufficient evidence. The judge admonished the men for unreasonable excuses for punishment and treatment of the boys as if they were slaves. Tom's reputation was ruined; Alec was "not implicated in the beatings".

In 1902, Alec took full control of the stables. Under his control, there were no reports of inappropriate punishment. The stables' reputation began to improve when Taylor trained Sceptre, "one of the greatest fillies in the history of racing." Sceptre's performance had faltered under poor management by the previous owner, and bounced back under Taylor's leadership. Manton Stables were considered one of Britain's "most famous and prestigious training facilities" and were described as:

The buildings possess a singularly attractive and quiet beauty. [There are] spacious paddocks, splendid stables, and boxes [stalls] unsurpassed for size and abundance of light and air.

At Manton, Alec Taylor trained a large number of successful horses. In 1902, the horses that he trained won 12 races, there were 31 wins in 1907, and 47 in 1910. Over that period his winnings increased from £2,305 to £52,364. Bayardo, a horse he trained, won 22 of 25 races and Taylor earned the reputation of "developing stayers".

In 1904, horses began to appear at Manton from the stud of Alfred Cox (Mr Fairie). Somewhat fortuitously, Alfie Cox became one of the founder shareholders of the Australian Mining Co Broken Hill Proprietary as a jackeroo. On his return to England he set up a thoroughbred stud which produced Bayardo, Lemberg, Kennymore, Gay Crusadwe, and Gainsborough, all Classic Winners from Manton.

From the proceeds of success, Alec Taylor purchased adjoining farms as they became available, one being named 'Bayardo' after 1909 St Leger winner. He claimed victory in twenty-one of the Classic Races, and won two British Triple Crown titles, in 1917 and 1918.

His training approach was described as follows:

He was renowned for his patience with his charges, at least the equine ones. Few juvenile victories figure in the stable's roll of honour as Taylor treated his two-year-olds as little more than infants and generally preferred them to mature before being raced or even trained hard.

In 1918 Taylor sold the Manton Estate of 5,500 acres to Joseph Watson, later made Baron Manton. In 1921 Taylor won for him The Oaks with Love in Idleness and the Grand Prix de Paris with Lemonora, both ridden by Joe Childs. In the same year of 1921 with Lemonora he obtained third place in the Derby for Watson.

Twelve times Taylor earned British flat racing Champion Trainer honours as the year's leader in earnings, including seven in a row between 1917 and 1923. Beyond his Classic winners, Taylor also trained Buchan and Picaroon, amongst others.

Taylor worked as trainer until his retirement in 1927. Joseph Lawson, who had been Taylor's assistant, became the stables' trainer. The stables were sold to the Tattersalls that year.

== Classic Race wins ==
2,000 Guineas

- Kennymore (1914), Gay Crusader (1917), Gainsborough (1918), Craig an Eran (1921)

1,000 Guineas

- Saucy Sue (1925)

Epsom Derby

- Lemberg (1910), Gay Crusader (1917), Gainsborough (1918)

Epsom Oaks

- Rosedrop (1910), Sunny Jane (1917), My Dear (1918), Bayuda (1919), Love in Idleness (1921), Pogrom (1922), Saucy Sue (1925), Short Story (1926)

St. Leger Stakes

- Challacombe (1905), Bayardo (1909), Gay Crusader (1917), Gainsborough (1918), Book Law (1927)
