= Sceptre (horse) =

British-bred Thoroughbred racehorse

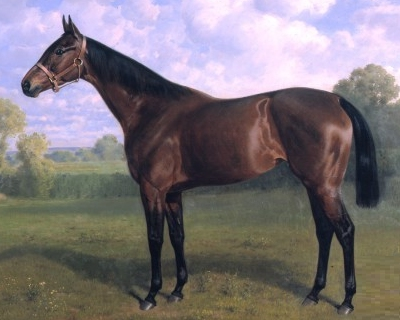
- Sceptre by Emil Adam.
- Sire: Persimmon
- Grandsire: St Simon
- Dam: Ornament
- Damsire: Bend Or
- Sex: Mare
- Foaled: 1899
- Country: Great Britain
- Colour: Bay
- Breeder: Hugh Grosvenor, 1st Duke of Westminster
- Owner: Robert Sievier; Sir William Bass; Edmund Somerville Tattersall; John Musker; Lord Glanely
- Trainer: Charles Morton; Robert Sievier; Alec Taylor, Jr.
- Record: 25: 13-5-3
- Earnings: £38,225

Major wins
- Woodcote Stakes (1901); July Stakes (1901); 2,000 Guineas (1902); 1,000 Guineas (1902); Epsom Oaks (1902); St. James's Palace Stakes (1902); Nassau Stakes (1902); St. Leger (1902); Hardwicke Stakes (1903); Jockey Club Stakes (1903); Duke of York Stakes (1903); Champion Stakes (1903)

Sceptre (1899–1926) was a British-bred and British-trained Thoroughbred racemare whose career ran from 1901 to 1904. In 1902, she became the only racehorse to win four British Classic Races outright.

== Breeding ==
Sceptre was bred by Hugh Grosvenor, 1st Duke of Westminster at his Eaton Stud in Cheshire and was foaled on 9 April 1899. Her sire, Persimmon, had won The Derby and St. Leger in 1896 and the Eclipse Stakes and Ascot Gold Cup in 1897. Sceptre's dam, Ornament, was sired by the Duke of Westminster's Bend Or and was herself a full sister to Triple Crown winner Ormonde.

== Racing career ==
The 1st Duke of Westminster died in 1899, and his bloodstock was auctioned. The Duke's trainer, John Porter, wanted the 2nd Duke to buy Sceptre, but was outbid by Robert Sievier, who bought her for 10,000 guineas. Sceptre proved to be a hardy filly. Sievier, who trained her himself for most of her three-year-old season, was in almost constant need for funds, and betting on the filly was one way to keep himself afloat. He ran Sceptre in a number of major races, particularly as a three-year-old, before selling her at the age of four.

=== 1901 ===
Sievier sent Sceptre to be trained by Charles Morton at Wantage. She ran three times at two, winning the Woodcote Stakes at Epsom and the July Stakes at Newmarket before being beaten in the Champagne Stakes at Doncaster Racecourse. At the end of the season, Morton became private trainer to Jack Joel, and Sievier decided to train his own horses at a yard at Shrewton in Wiltshire which he leased from John Porter.

=== 1902 ===
Staggeringly by modern standards, Sceptre began her season in the Lincolnshire Handicap with Sievier backing her to win £30,000. She carried 6 stone 7 pounds (41.5 kilograms) but was beaten by a head. She then went to Newmarket and won both the 2,000 Guineas in a then record time of 1 minute 39 seconds and two days later the 1,000 Guineas. Her next target was the Derby but she bruised a foot ten days before the race and finished fourth behind Ard Patrick after being left at the start. Two days later, she won The Oaks. Sievier then ran her in the Grand Prix de Paris, where she was unplaced, and then twice at Royal Ascot, where she was fourth in the Coronation Stakes and won the St. James's Palace Stakes. Sceptre also ran twice at Glorious Goodwood, where she was beaten in the Sussex Stakes on the opening day but won the Nassau Stakes three days later after being galloped on the intervening two days. At the autumn meeting at Doncaster she won her fourth classic, the St. Leger. Sievier ran her again two days later over the same course and distance in the Park Hill Stakes, in which she was beaten. At the end of the season, Sievier sent Sceptre to auction to raise money but she failed to reach her reserve price.

=== 1903 and 1904 ===
Sceptre's four-year-old season began with Sievier making another attempt to win the Lincoln to raise money. She carried 9 stone 1 pound this time and was beaten into fifth place. Sievier then sold her for £25,000 to Sir William Bass, who sent her to Manton to be trained by Alec Taylor, Jr. She won the Hardwicke Stakes at Royal Ascot before losing by a neck to Ard Patrick in the Eclipse Stakes at Sandown Park with the 1903 Derby winner Rock Sand behind her in third. Sceptre won her four remaining races in 1903, taking the Jockey Club Stakes, Duke of York Stakes, Champion Stakes and Limekiln Stakes. In her final season, 1904, she raced only three times but was placed in all three, finishing second in the Coronation Cup, and third in the Hardwicke Stakes and Ascot Gold Cup. She retired with 13 victories to her name, worth over £38,000.

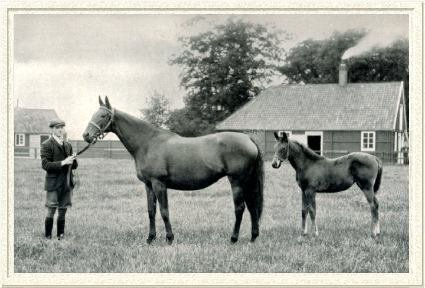
Sceptre and her second foal, Maid of Corinth (1907)

== Later life ==
Sceptre changed hands several more times, being owned by Edmund Somerville Tattersall of the Tattersalls family, John Musker and finally Lord Glanely. She produced eight foals (one colt and seven fillies), and although none of her offspring were of her quality, four of her daughters won races. One of them, Maid of the Mist, established a bloodline which could be found in classic winners Relko, April the Fifth and Craig an Eran. She remains the only horse to have won four British Classics outright – Formosa won the same four classics as Sceptre in 1868 but dead heated for the 2,000 Guineas.

In 1923 after failed attempts to get Sceptre in foal, Lord Glanely sold her to a Brazilian breeder despite the promise when he purchased her that she would remain in his care for the remainder of her life. However, public outcry led Glanely to cancel the sale. Sceptre lived in England until her death in February 1926.

== Pedigree ==
Pedigree of Sceptre (GB), bay mare, 1899
Sire Persimmon b. 1893	St Simon b. 1881	Galopin b. 1872	Vedette
Sire Persimmon b. 1893	St Simon b. 1881	Galopin b. 1872	Flying Duchess
Sire Persimmon b. 1893	St Simon b. 1881	St. Angela b. 1865	King Tom
Sire Persimmon b. 1893	St Simon b. 1881	St. Angela b. 1865	Adeline
Sire Persimmon b. 1893	Perdita II b. 1881	Hampton b. 1872	Lord Clifden
Sire Persimmon b. 1893	Perdita II b. 1881	Hampton b. 1872	Lady Langden
Sire Persimmon b. 1893	Perdita II b. 1881	Hermione br. 1875	Young Melbourne
Sire Persimmon b. 1893	Perdita II b. 1881	Hermione br. 1875	La Belle Helene
Dam Ornament b. 1887	Bend Or ch. 1877	Doncaster ch. 1870	Stockwell
Dam Ornament b. 1887	Bend Or ch. 1877	Doncaster ch. 1870	Marigold
Dam Ornament b. 1887	Bend Or ch. 1877	Rouge Rose ch. 1865	Thormanby
Dam Ornament b. 1887	Bend Or ch. 1877	Rouge Rose ch. 1865	Ellen Horne
Dam Ornament b. 1887	Lily Agnes b. 1871	Macaroni b. 1860	Sweetmeat
Dam Ornament b. 1887	Lily Agnes b. 1871	Macaroni b. 1860	Jocose
Dam Ornament b. 1887	Lily Agnes b. 1871	Polly Agnes b./br. 1865	The Cure
Dam Ornament b. 1887	Lily Agnes b. 1871	Polly Agnes b./br. 1865	Miss Agnes (Family: 16-h)

Note: b. = Bay, br. = Brown, ch. = Chestnut

== See also ==
- List of leading Thoroughbred racehorses
- Triple Crown of Thoroughbred Racing
