= Pretty Polly (horse) =

Irish-bred Thoroughbred racehorse (1901–1931)

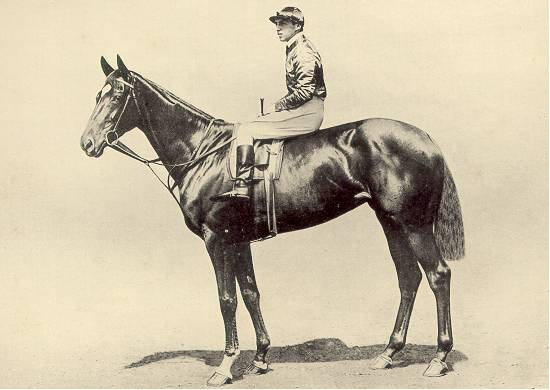
- Sire: Gallinule
- Grandsire: Isonomy
- Dam: Admiration
- Damsire: Saraband
- Sex: Filly
- Foaled: March 1901
- Country: Ireland
- Colour: Chestnut
- Breeder: Eustace Loder, Eyrefield Lodge Stud
- Owner: Eustace Loder
- Trainer: Peter Gilpin
- Record: 24: 22-2-0
- Earnings: £38,597

Major wins
- Champagne Stakes (1903); Cheveley Park Stakes (1903); Middle Park Plate (1903); 1,000 Guineas (1904); Oaks Stakes (1904); Coronation Stakes (1904); Nassau Stakes (1904); Park Hill Stakes (1904); St. Leger Stakes (1904); Coronation Cup (1905, 1906); Jockey Club Cup (1905); Champion Stakes (1905)

Honours
- Pretty Polly Stakes (Ireland); Pretty Polly Stakes (Great Britain)
- Last updated on 11 July 2024

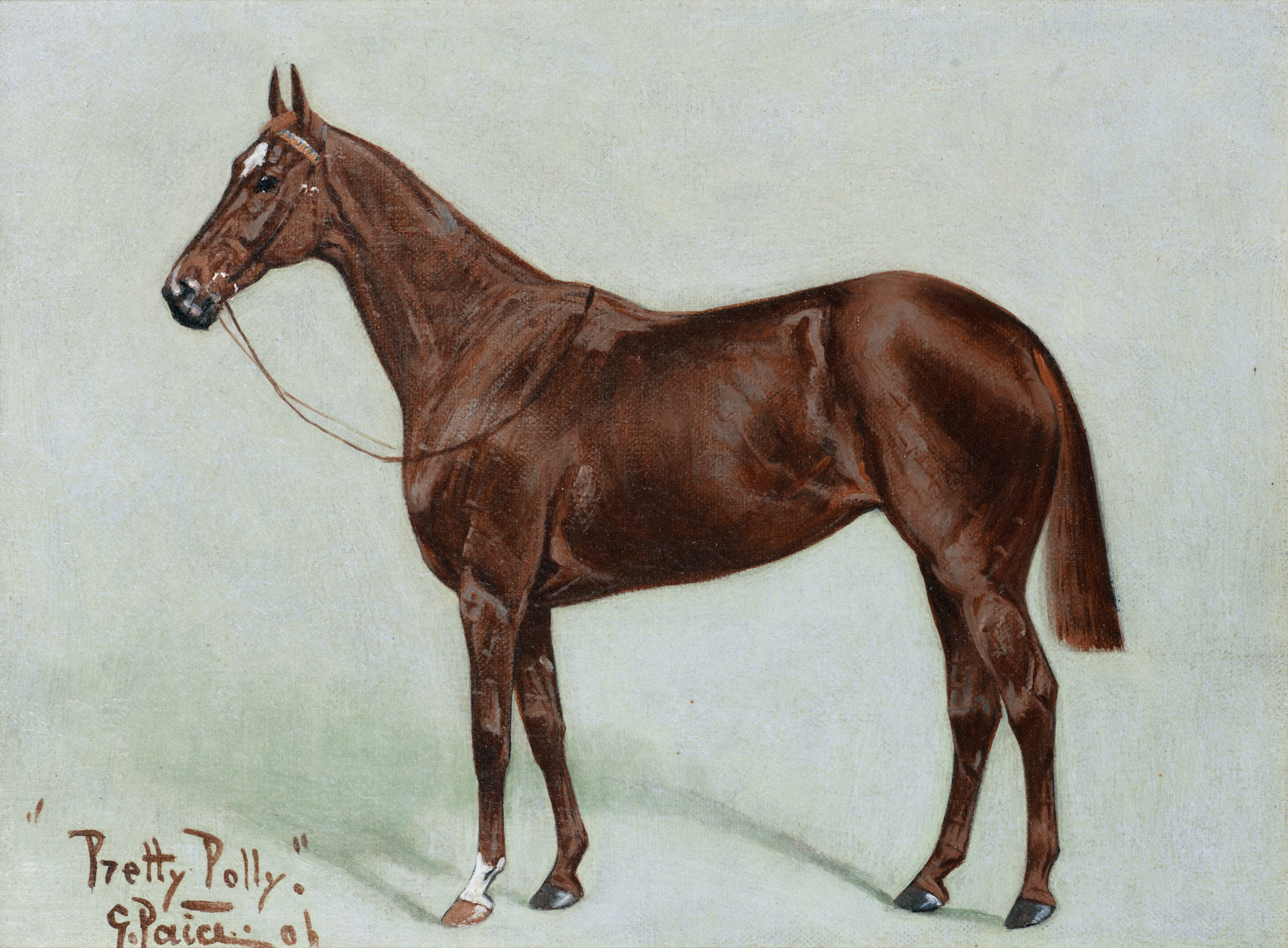
Pretty Polly (George Paice, 1906)

Pretty Polly (March 1901 – 17 August 1931) was an Irish-bred, British-trained Thoroughbred racehorse and broodmare. One of the greatest fillies ever to race in Britain, she won fifteen consecutive races and was only the fifth horse to win the British Fillies Triple Crown since its inception in 1814. Pretty Polly also became one of the greatest broodmares of the century.

== Breeding ==
Her sire was the good stallion, Gallinule who was also a roarer and bleeder. Pretty Polly's dam was the cluster mare, Admiration by Saraband, who won two small races in Ireland, before being tried as a steeplechaser. Admiration foaled nine winners, which won 42 races worth £52,484, and founded a successful female family, which included top class gallopers Craganour, Cresta Run, King John and Tehran.

== Racing record ==
Pretty Polly was bred and owned by Major Eustace Loder and trained by Peter Gilpin, she won nine races from nine starts as a two-year-old in 1903.

The following year, Pretty Polly won the 1,000 Guineas as 1-4 favourite, winning easily by three lengths in record time. Other wins as a three-year-old were The Oaks, the Coronation Stakes at Royal Ascot, the Nassau Stakes at Goodwood, the St. Leger Stakes (completing the Fillies' Triple Crown) and the Park Hill Stakes with jockey William Lane.

Pretty Polly stayed in training as a four and five-year-old, winning six more races, including the Coronation Cup in 1905 and 1906.

In total, Pretty Polly won 22 of her 24 races, placing second twice, in Paris in 1904 and in the 1906 Ascot Gold Cup.

== Stud record ==
Pretty Polly was returned to the place of her birth, Eyrefield Lodge Stud, to begin her new career as a broodmare. Here Pretty Polly produced ten foals and four of these were flat race winners who between them won eleven races for £6,107. Another son, Tudor King (1920) won a small hurdle race. Her four daughters (each by a different sire) were successful as broodmares, founding the classic winning Pretty Polly family which remains important in the stud book. Pretty Polly was the fourth dam of the good sire, Donatello II, the fifth dam of Brigadier Gerard and the sixth dam of The Derby winner St. Paddy.

== Honours ==
Pretty Polly was recorded as Cluster mare, number CM/73 by Denis Craig in his book, Breeding Racehorses from Cluster Mares. In A Century of Champions by John Randall and Tony Morris she was named Broodmare of the Century as the Matriarch of Family 14-C, the most successful female family in Thoroughbred racing history.

The London and North Eastern Railway named one of its class A3 Pacific express steam locomotives (no. 2560, later 60061; in service from 1925 to 1963) Pretty Polly after the racehorse.

== Pedigree ==
Pedigree of Pretty Polly (IRE), chestnut mare, 1901
Sire Gallinule 1884	Isonomy; 1875	Sterling	Oxford
Sire Gallinule 1884	Isonomy; 1875	Sterling	Whisper
Sire Gallinule 1884	Isonomy; 1875	Isola Bella	Stockwell
Sire Gallinule 1884	Isonomy; 1875	Isola Bella	Isoline
Sire Gallinule 1884	Moorhen; 1873	Hermit	Newminster
Sire Gallinule 1884	Moorhen; 1873	Hermit	Seclusion
Sire Gallinule 1884	Moorhen; 1873	sister to Ryshworth	Skirmisher
Sire Gallinule 1884	Moorhen; 1873	sister to Ryshworth	Vertumna
Dam Admiration 1892	Saraband; 1883	Muncaster	Doncaster
Dam Admiration 1892	Saraband; 1883	Muncaster	Windermere
Dam Admiration 1892	Saraband; 1883	Highland Fling	Scottish Chief
Dam Admiration 1892	Saraband; 1883	Highland Fling	Masquerade
Dam Admiration 1892	Gaze; 1886	Thuringian Prince	Thormanby
Dam Admiration 1892	Gaze; 1886	Thuringian Prince	Eastern Princess
Dam Admiration 1892	Gaze; 1886	Eye-Pleaser	Brown Bread
Dam Admiration 1892	Gaze; 1886	Eye-Pleaser	Wallflower (Family: 14-b)

== See also ==
- List of racehorses
- List of leading Thoroughbred racehorses
- Triple Crown of Thoroughbred Racing
