= Rose of England (horse) =

British-bred Thoroughbred racehorse

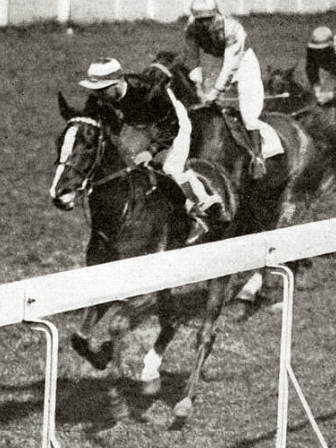
- Rose of England winning the 1930 Oaks.
- Sire: Teddy
- Grandsire: Ajax
- Dam: Perce Neige
- Damsire: Neil Gow
- Sex: Mare
- Foaled: 1927
- Country: United Kingdom
- Colour: Brown
- Breeder: Lady James Douglas
- Owner: Lord Glanely
- Trainer: Thomas Hogg
- Record: 6: 1-0-0
- Earnings: £8,153

Major wins
- Epsom Oaks (1930)

Rose of England (1927 – April 1947) was a British Thoroughbred racehorse and broodmare. She was unraced as a two-year-old and finished fifth in the 1000 Guineas on her debut before recording her first and only win in the Epsom Oaks. She failed to win in four subsequent races and was retired from racing at the end of the year. She had considerable success as a dam of winners.

== Background ==
Rose of England was a brown mare with a white blaze and a white sock on her right hind leg bred in the United Kingdom by Lady James Douglas. As a yearling in 1928 the filly was put up for auction and bought for 3,100 guineas by Lord Glanely. She was sent into training with Lord Glanely's private trainer Thomas Hogg at Newmarket, Suffolk.

She was sired by the French stallion Teddy who stood with great success in both France and the United States. His other offspring included Sir Gallahad, Bull Dog and La Troienne. Rose of England's dam Perce-Neige produced several over winners including the winner Winterhalter (Coronation Cup) and Star of England (Yorkshire Oaks).

== Racing career ==
=== 1930: three-year-old season ===
On 9 May 1930 Rose of England made her racecourse debut in the 1000 Guineas over the Rowley Mile course at Newmarket Racecourse and ran well to finish fifth behind Lord Derby's filly Fair Isle who won from Torchere and Sister Clover. On 6 of June the filly was stepped up in distance for the Oaks over one and a half miles at Epsom Racecourse in which she was partnered by Gordon Richards and started at odds of 7/1 in a fifteen-runner field. Fair Isle was made the 5/4 favourite. Rose of England won the race by three lengths from Wedding Favour with Micmac taking third place ahead of Fair Isle.

Rose of England failed to win in four subsequent races. She finished unplaced behind The Pen in the Cambridgeshire Handicap at Newmarket in October.

== Assessment and honours ==
In their book, A Century of Champions, based on the Timeform rating system, John Randall and Tony Morris rated Rose of England a "poor" winner of the Oaks.

== Breeding record ==
At the end of her racing career Rose of England was retired to become a broodmare for her owner's stud. After Lord Glanely's death in 1942 the mare was bought by Florence Nagle. She produced at least ten foals and five winners between 1932 and 1943:

- Rosegain, a brown filly, foaled in 1932, sired by Gainsborough. Winner.
- Eastern Rose, brown filly, 1933, by Singapore
- Chulmleigh, bay colt, 1934, by Singapore. Won St Leger
- Faerie Queene, brown filly, 1935, by Solario. Won Scottish Derby and Newmarket Oaks.
- Rose of Kandy, brown filly, 1936, by Colombo
- British Empire, bay colt, 1937, by Colombo. Won July Stakes. Leading sire in Argentina.
- Rangoon, colt, 1939, by Singapore
- Merchant Navy, bay colt, 1940, by Hyperion
- Coastal Traffic, bay colt, 1941, by Hyperion. Winner.
- Westerlands Rose, bay filly, 1943, by Colombo

Rose of England produced no living foals after 1943 and died in April 1947.

== Pedigree ==
Pedigree of Rose of England (GB), brown mare, 1927
Sire Teddy (FR) 1913	Ajax (FR); 1901	Flying Fox (GB)	Orme
Sire Teddy (FR) 1913	Ajax (FR); 1901	Flying Fox (GB)	Vampire
Sire Teddy (FR) 1913	Ajax (FR); 1901	Amie	Clamart
Sire Teddy (FR) 1913	Ajax (FR); 1901	Amie	Alice
Sire Teddy (FR) 1913	Rondeau (GB); 1900	Bay Ronald	Hampton
Sire Teddy (FR) 1913	Rondeau (GB); 1900	Bay Ronald	Black Duchess
Sire Teddy (FR) 1913	Rondeau (GB); 1900	Doremi	Bend Or
Sire Teddy (FR) 1913	Rondeau (GB); 1900	Doremi	Lady Emily
Dam Perce-Neige (GB) 1916	Neil Gow (GB); 1907	Marco	Barcaldine (IRE)
Dam Perce-Neige (GB) 1916	Neil Gow (GB); 1907	Marco	Novitiate
Dam Perce-Neige (GB) 1916	Neil Gow (GB); 1907	Chelandry	Goldfinch
Dam Perce-Neige (GB) 1916	Neil Gow (GB); 1907	Chelandry	Illuminata
Dam Perce-Neige (GB) 1916	Gallenza (IRE); 1905	Galllinule (GB)	Isonomy
Dam Perce-Neige (GB) 1916	Gallenza (IRE); 1905	Galllinule (GB)	Moorhen
Dam Perce-Neige (GB) 1916	Gallenza (IRE); 1905	Excellenza (GB)	Haut Brion
Dam Perce-Neige (GB) 1916	Gallenza (IRE); 1905	Excellenza (GB)	Gulbeyaz (Family 3-i)
