= Chulmleigh (horse) =

British-bred Thoroughbred racehorse

- Sire: Singapore
- Grandsire: Gainsborough
- Dam: Rose of England
- Damsire: Teddy
- Sex: Stallion
- Foaled: 1934
- Country: United Kingdom
- Colour: Bay
- Breeder: William Tatem, 1st Baron Glanely
- Owner: Lord Glanely
- Trainer: Thomas Hogg
- Record: 7: 2-1-1
- Earnings: £10,565

Major wins
- St Leger (1937)

Chulmleigh (1934 – after 1957) was a British Thoroughbred racehorse and sire. He showed little ability in his early career and finished no better than third in his first four races before winning a minor race at Chepstow Racecourse in the summer of his three-year-old season. After a promising second at York in August he recorded a major upset by winning the St Leger Stakes. He was retired soon afterwards and stood as a breeding stallion in Britain and Argentina. He had little success as a sire of winners.

== Background ==
Chulmleigh was a "massive" bay horse standing 16.3 hands high bred in England by William Tatem, 1st Baron Glanely who also owned him during his racing career. The horse had an unusual facial marking in the form of an abbreviated white blaze which began half-way down his face and ran down to his nose. He was sent into training with Lord Glanely's private trainer Thomas Hogg at Newmarket, Suffolk.

Both of Chulmleigh's parents were Classic winners who had been owned by Lord Glanely and trained by Hogg. He was from the first crop of foals sired by Singapore, who won the St Leger in 1930, while his dam, Rose of England took the Oaks Stakes in the same year. Singapore was not a great success as a breeding stallion and was eventually exported to Brazil. Rose of England produced several other good horses including the July Stakes winner British Empire.

== Racing career ==
=== 1936: two-year-old season ===
Chulmleigh ran three times as two-year-old in 1936, producing his only placed effort on his debut when running third in the Whitsuntide Plate at Manchester Racecourse in June. Later that month he was sent to Royal Ascot for the Chesham Stakes but came home unplaced behind Lord Derby's colt Fair Copy, who won the Middle Park Stakes later that year. He returned after a break for the Imperial Produce Stakes at Kempton Park Racecourse in autumn but finished unplaced.

=== 1937: three-year-old season ===
Chulmleigh did not compete as a three-year-old until July and then made no impact in a seven furlong maiden race at Newmarket Racecourse as he finished unplaced at odds of 20/1. The colt eventually won a race at the fifth attempt when he defeated moderate opposition to take the Summer Stakes at Chepstow. At York Racecourse in August, Chulmleigh showed high-class form for the first time as he produced a strong late run and finished a close second to the gelding Mange Tout in the Great Yorkshire Stakes.

On 8 September Chulmleigh was moved into the highest class to contest the 162nd running of the St Leger Stakes over 14 1/2 furlongs at Doncaster Racecourse. Before the race he was described as having "nothing to his credit" as a contender. Ridden by Gordon Richards, who only took the ride when his intended mount was withdrawn, he started an 18/1 outsider in a fifteen-runner field headed by the Epsom Derby winner Mid-day Sun. After taking an early lead, he settled behind the leaders as Maranta set the pace from a closely bunched field. Many horse were still in close contention a furlong out at which point Fair Copy went to the front and looked the likely winner. Chulmleigh, however, produced a strong late run to overtake Fair Copy inside the last 50 yards and won by half a length in what was described as a "sensational finish". Mid-Day Sun, who had been repeatedly hampered, was three-quarters of a length away in third.

Chulmleigh was expected to reappear in the Jockey Club Stakes but never ran again and was retired to stud at the end of the 1938 season.

== Assessment and honours ==
In their book, A Century of Champions, based on the Timeform rating system, John Randall and Tony Morris rated Chulmleigh a "poor" winner of the St Leger.

== Stud record ==
Chulmleigh stood as a stallion in England but attracted little interest from breeders. The best of his offspring was probably Whiteway, who won the Yorkshire Cup and the Cesarewitch. He also sired the mare Sweet and Rough who produced the Goodwood Cup winner Tenterhooks. In 1945 he was sold and exported to Argentina where his last reported foals were born in 1958.

== Pedigree ==
Pedigree of Chulmleigh (GB), bay stallion, 1934
Sire Singapore (GB) 1927	Gainsborough (GB); 1915	Bayardo	Bay Ronald*
Sire Singapore (GB) 1927	Gainsborough (GB); 1915	Bayardo	Galicia
Sire Singapore (GB) 1927	Gainsborough (GB); 1915	Rosedrop	St Frusquin
Sire Singapore (GB) 1927	Gainsborough (GB); 1915	Rosedrop	Rosaline
Sire Singapore (GB) 1927	Tetrabbazia (IRE); 1918	The Tetrarch	Roi Herode
Sire Singapore (GB) 1927	Tetrabbazia (IRE); 1918	The Tetrarch	Vahren
Sire Singapore (GB) 1927	Tetrabbazia (IRE); 1918	Abbazia (GB)	Isinglass
Sire Singapore (GB) 1927	Tetrabbazia (IRE); 1918	Abbazia (GB)	Mrs Butterwick
Dam Rose of England (GB) 1927	Teddy (FR); 1913	Ajax	Flying Fox
Dam Rose of England (GB) 1927	Teddy (FR); 1913	Ajax	Amie
Dam Rose of England (GB) 1927	Teddy (FR); 1913	Rondeau (GB)	Bay Ronald*
Dam Rose of England (GB) 1927	Teddy (FR); 1913	Rondeau (GB)	Doremi
Dam Rose of England (GB) 1927	Perce-Neige (GB); 1916	Neil Gow	Marco
Dam Rose of England (GB) 1927	Perce-Neige (GB); 1916	Neil Gow	Chelandry
Dam Rose of England (GB) 1927	Perce-Neige (GB); 1916	Gallenza (IRE)	Gallinule
Dam Rose of England (GB) 1927	Perce-Neige (GB); 1916	Gallenza (IRE)	Excellenza (Family: 3-i)

* Chulmleigh is inbred 4S x 4D to the stallion Bay Ronald, meaning that he appears fourth generation on the sire side of his pedigree, and fourth generation on the dam side of his pedigree.
