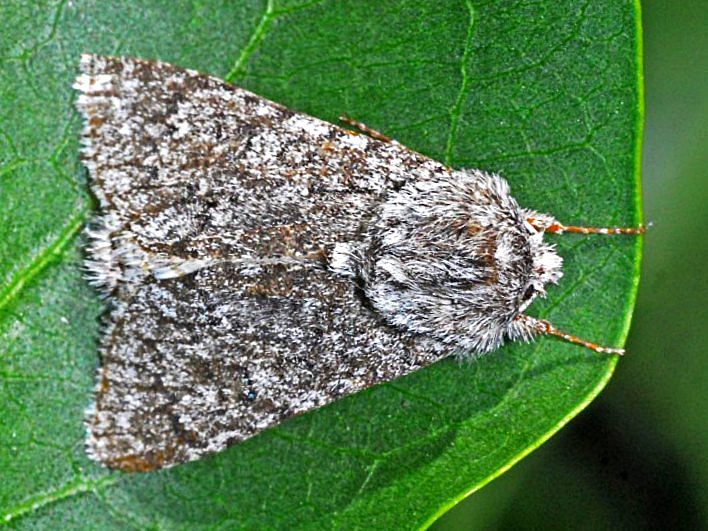
- Acronicta euphorbiae. Dorsal view
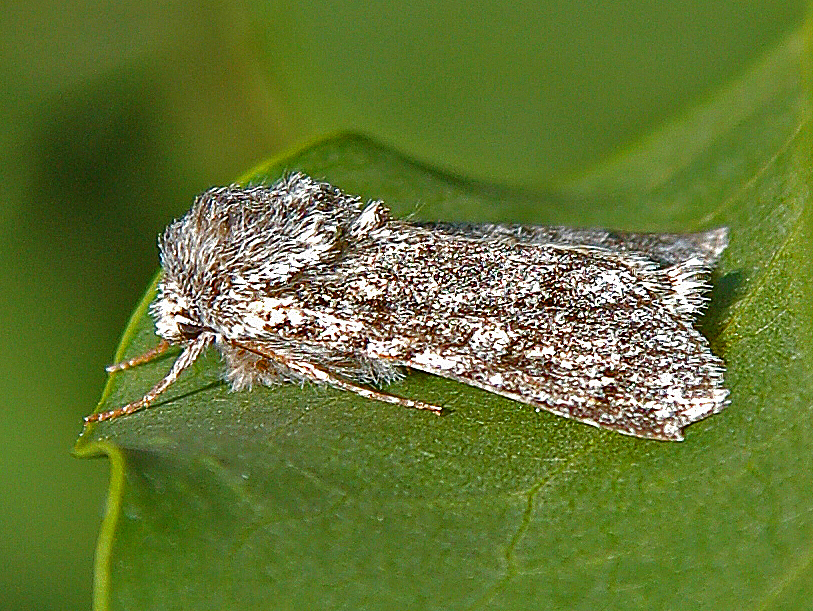
- Side view

Scientific classification
- Kingdom: Animalia
- Phylum: Arthropoda
- Clade: Pancrustacea
- Class: Insecta
- Order: Lepidoptera
- Superfamily: Noctuoidea
- Family: Noctuidae
- Genus: Acronicta
- Species: A. euphorbiae

Binomial name
- Acronicta euphorbiae (Denis & Schiffermüller, 1775)

Synonyms
- Acronycta euphrasiae; Apatele euphorbiae

= Acronicta euphorbiae =

Species of moth

Acronicta euphorbiae, the sweet gale moth, is a moth of the family Noctuidae. The species was first described by Michael Denis and Ignaz Schiffermüller in 1775.

== Similar species ==
- Acronicta auricoma
- Acronicta megacephala
- Acronicta aceris
- Acronicta menyanthidis

== Distribution ==
This species is distributed through parts of the Palearctic south of a line that is across southern Poland, from northern Scotland, northeastern Netherlands/border with north-western Germany, southeastward through the northern Czech Republic, Ukraine and southern Russia to the Ural mountains.

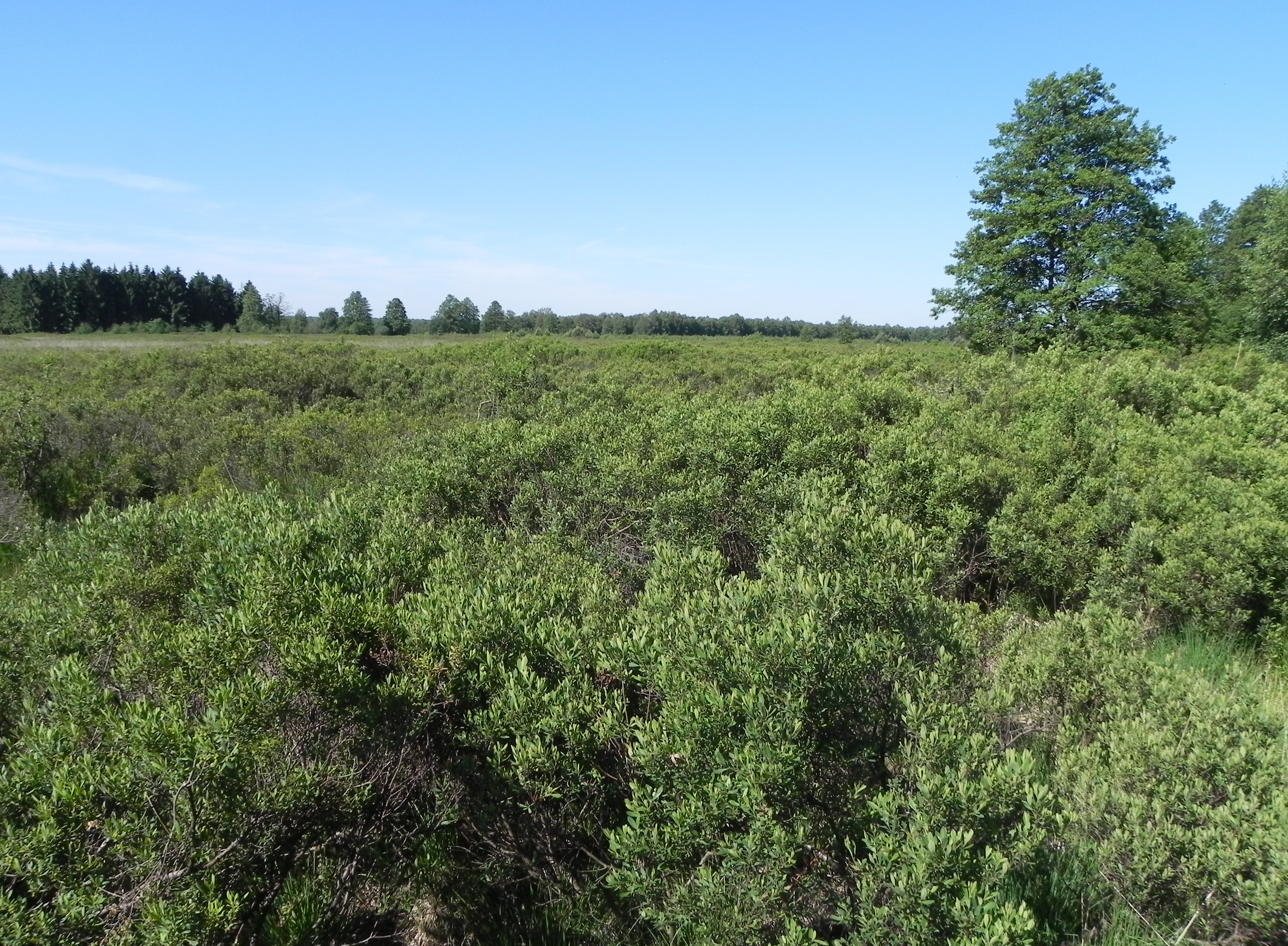
Habitat, Germany

== Habitat ==
These moths prefer warm, sunny slopes, grassy heaths, moorland and forests. In the Alps, they rise up to over 2500 metres above sea level.

== Description ==
The wingspan of Acronicta euphorbiae can reach 32–40 mm. The females are slightly larger than the males and have darker hindwings. Forewings are grey dusted with darker; orbicular stigma is close beyond inner line; hindwings are white in male, fuscous in female with pale cilia. The ab. montivaga Guen. is a mountain form, with darker, bluer grey forewings, occurring in the Alps and in Norway. The ab. myricae Guen., occurring in the Scottish and Irish mountains, is still darker, with narrower, more pointed forewings, but not smaller as Staudinger states. The ab. euphrasiae Brahm, which appears to be the commoner form in France and south-western Europe, is paler than the type and more luteous; Lastly, the ab. esulae. Hbn. is a quite, small form, with the markings obscured.

Unlike adults the caterpillars are brightly coloured, with hairy spikes. They gets more colourful as they grow.

== Biology ==
The adults fly at night from May to June. The larvae feed on a wide range of plants, mainly on heather (Calluna vulgaris), bog-myrtle (Myrica gale), Euphorbia, Achillea, Rumex and Plantago.

== Gallery ==
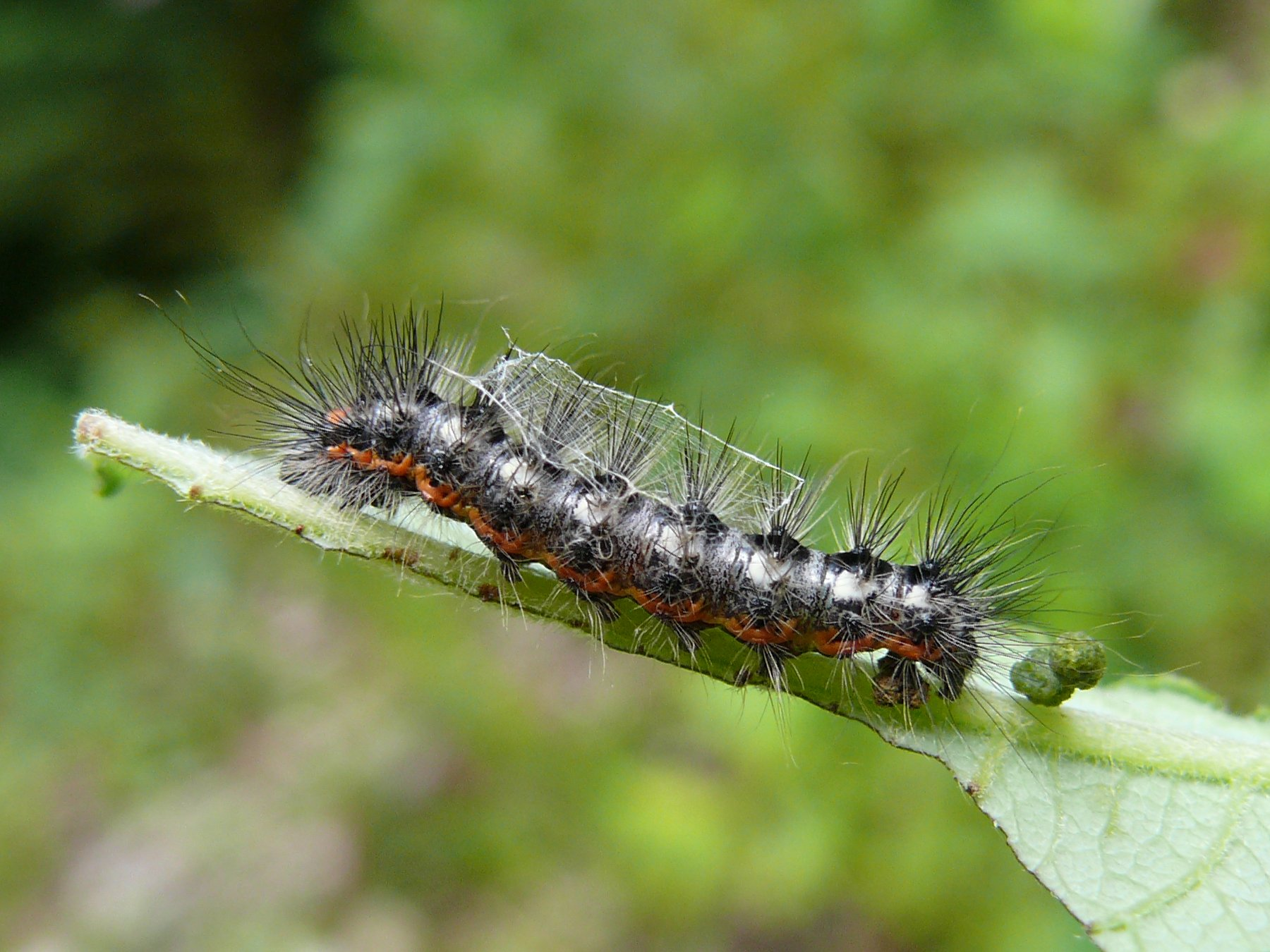
Sweet gale moth larva, first instar

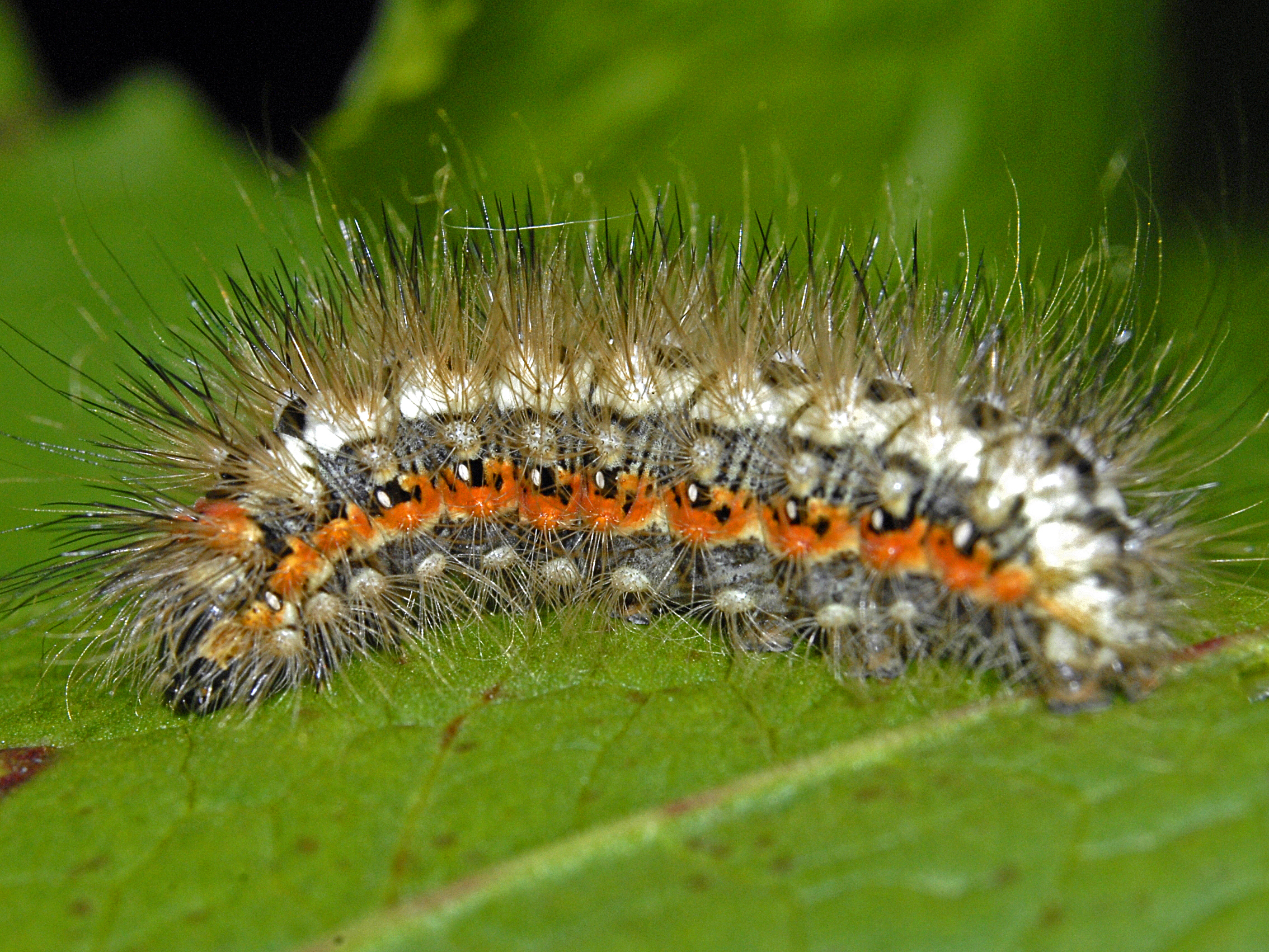
Caterpillar of Acronicta euphorbiae, last instar

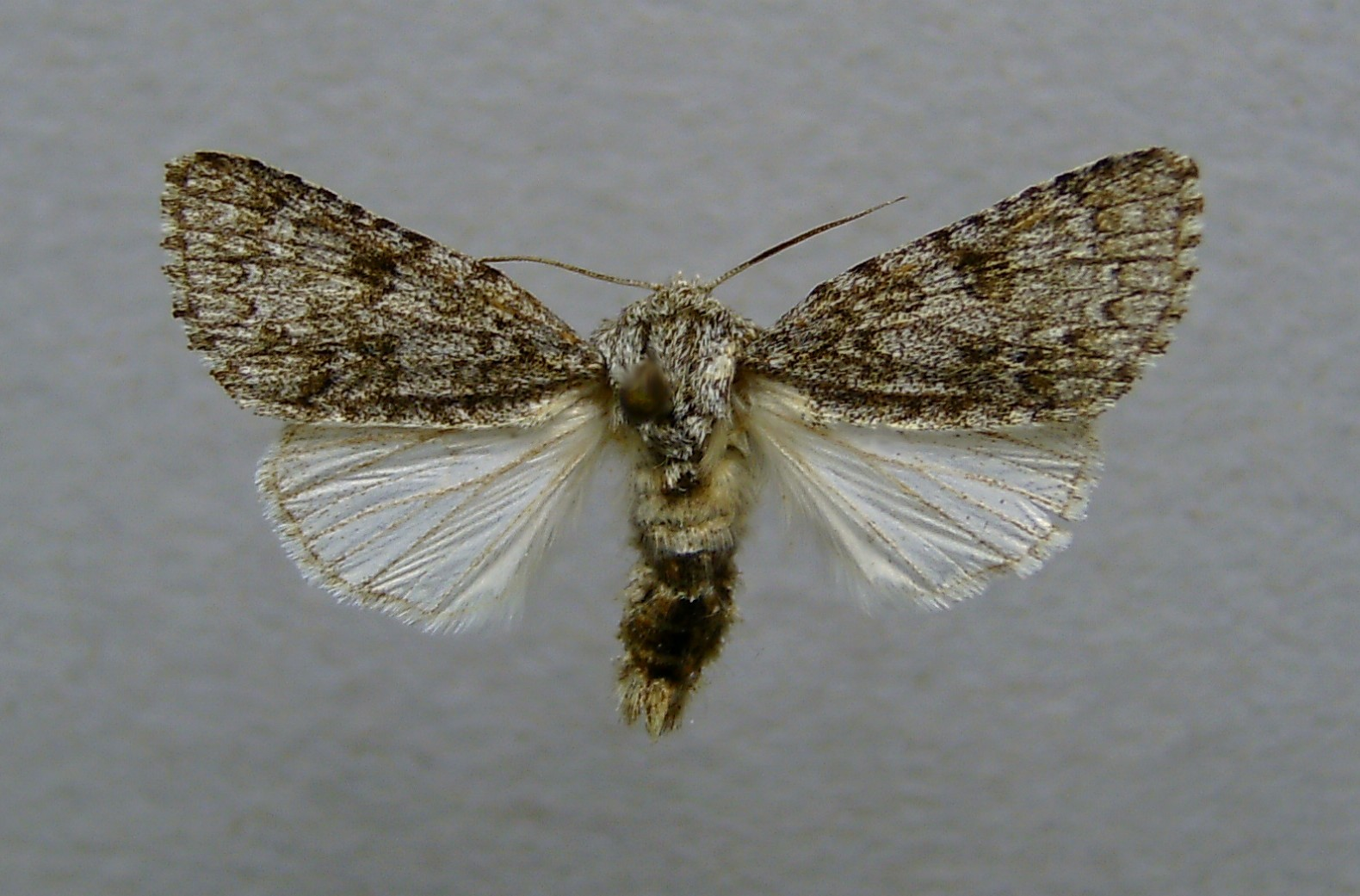
Mounted male

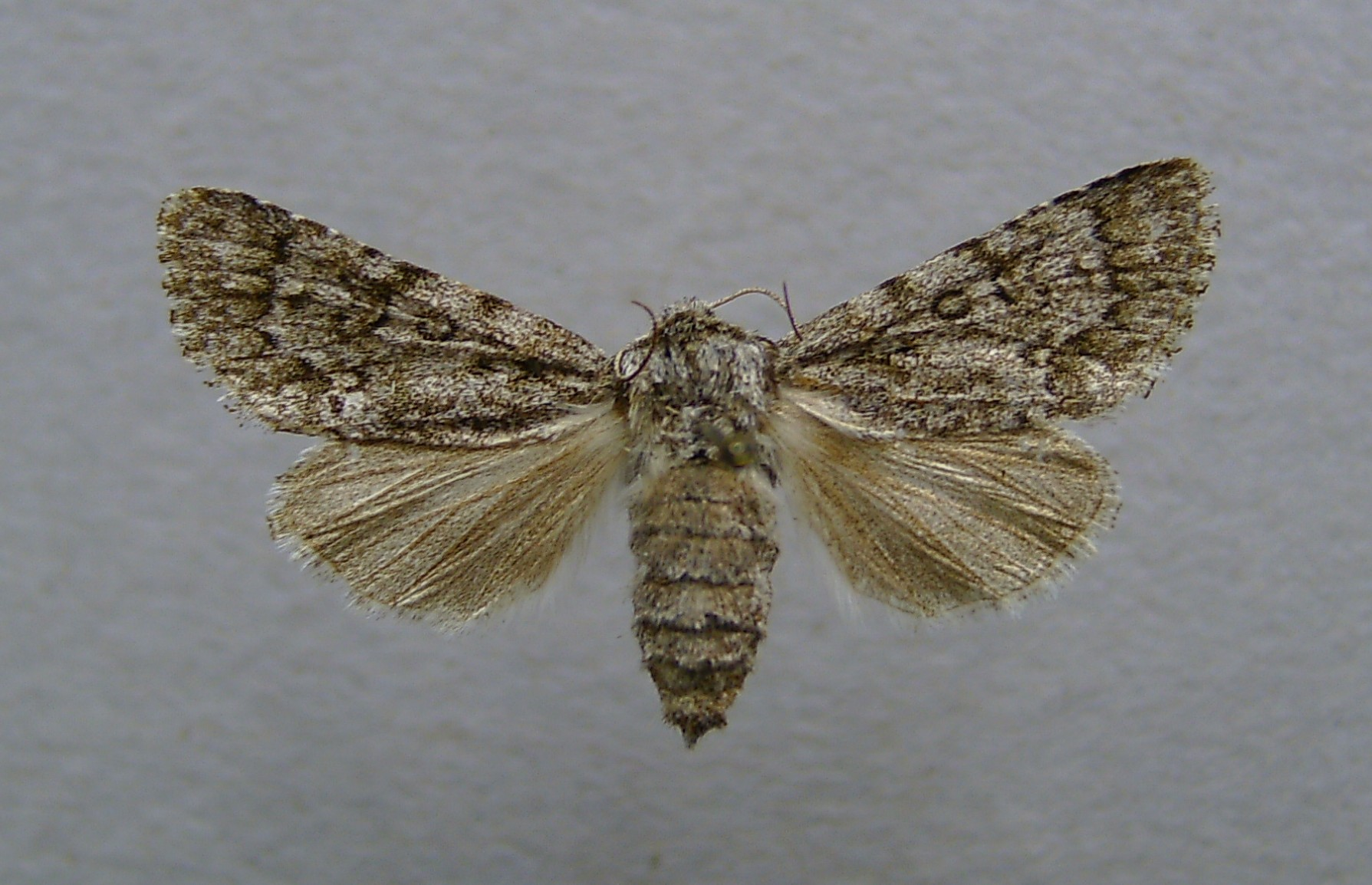
Mounted female

== Notes ==
1. The flight season refers to the British Isles. This may vary in other parts of the range.
