= Mrs Butterwick =

British-bred Thoroughbred racehorse

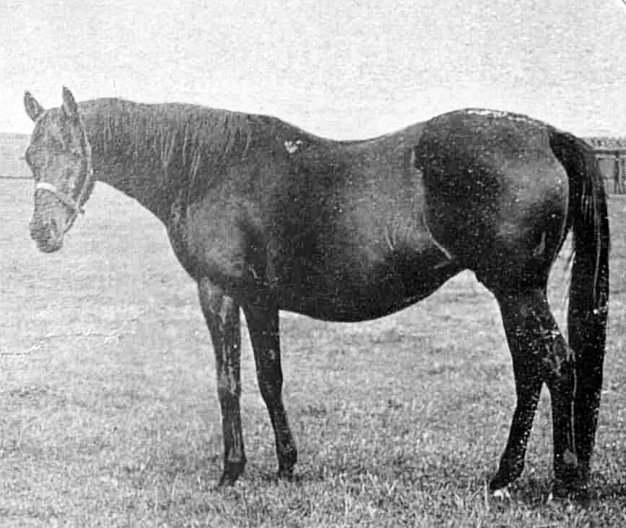
- Mrs. Butterwick in 1905.
- Sire: St Simon
- Grandsire: Galopin
- Dam: Miss Middlewick
- Damsire: Scottish Chief
- Sex: Mare
- Foaled: 1890
- Country: United Kingdom
- Colour: Bay
- Breeder: Robert St Clair-Erskine, 4th Earl of Rosslyn
- Owner: William Cavendish-Bentinck, 6th Duke of Portland
- Trainer: George Dawson
- Record: 18: 6-2-1 (incomplete)

Major wins
- Oaks Stakes (1893)

Mrs Butterwick (1890 – November 1915) was a British Thoroughbred racehorse and broodmare. She spent most of her racing career competing in sprint races but recorded her biggest victory over a distance of one and a half miles when she won the Oaks Stakes in 1893. She showed good form as a two-year-old, winning three races and finishing second against older horses in the July Cup. In the following year she began her campaign with a defeat over five furlongs before being stepped up in distance for her upset win in the Oaks three days later. She spent the rest of her career competing in handicap races and won at least twice under big weights in 1894. After her retirement from racing she had considerable success as a dam of winners.

== Background ==
Mrs Butterwick was a "very small" bay mare with a "perfect action" bred in England by Robert St Clair-Erskine, 4th Earl of Rosslyn. As a foal she was bought by William Cavendish-Bentinck, 6th Duke of Portland who owned her throughout her racing career. The Duke sent her into training with his private trainer George Dawson at Heath House stable in Newmarket, Suffolk.

She was sired by St. Simon, an undefeated racehorse who was considered one of the best British runners of the 19th Century. In an outstanding stud career he won nine sires' championships, having sired ten Classic winners. Her dam Miss Middlewick was very successful broodmare whose other foals included Grafton (Doncaster Cup), His Reverence (St James's Palace Stakes) and Dubia (female-line ancestor of Sun Briar).

== Racing career ==
=== 1892: two-year-old season ===
In 1892 Mrs Butterwick ran ten times and won three races. In spring she took the Althorp Stakes at Northampton Racecourse and the Hartington Plate at Manchester. In the Whitsuntide Stakes over five furlongs at Manchester Racecourse on 11 June Mrs Butterwick started at odds of 6/1 and finished second to Lady Bobs, to whom she was conceding five pounds in weight. At Kempton Park Racecourse She was then matched against older horses in the July Cup at Newmarket Racecourse and finished second to the six-year-old Workington, in what was her only attempt of the year to race beyond five furlongs. On 1 September she was assigned top weight of 126 pounds for the Devonshire Nursery Handicap Stakes and won "cleverly" by three quarters of a length from Diplomatic.

It was reported that Mrs Butterwick was to run a half-mile match race against a greyhound named Fullerton (winner of the Waterloo Cup) at Sandown Park, but the plan does not appear to have been realised.

=== 1893: three-year-old season ===
On 31 May at Epsom Racecourse Mrs Butterwick finished third in a five-furlong sprint race. Three days later Mrs Butterwick, with John Watts in the saddle, was one of 17 runners to contest the 115th running of the Oaks Stakes over one and a half miles at the same track. Stirrup Cup was made favourite ahead of Silene, Tressure (third in the 1000 Guineas) and Erin, with Mrs Butterwick started at odds of 100/7. After starting quickly, Mrs Butterwick settled behind the leaders as Marietta set the pace before Stirrup Cup went to the front on the turn into the straight. Tressure overtook the favourite a quarter of a mile from the finish but Mrs Butterwick was making steady progress and joined the leader approaching the final furlong. After a "good race" the Duke of Portland's filly prevailed by half a length from Tressure with a gap of six lengths back to the 100/1 outsider Cypria in third. The result was particularly surprising as few had expected Mrs Butterwick to stay beyond sprint distances.

Mrs Butterwick reverted to sprint distances for the Stewards' Cup on 25 July at Goodwood Racecourse in which she was assigned a weight of 103 pounds and finished fourth of the twenty runners behind Medora, Marly and Quebec. At some point in the season, she was reportedly beaten by the colt Bill of Portland in the Newmarket Heath High Weight Handicap.

=== 1894: four-year-old season ===
Mrs Butterwick began her third season by carrying 126 pounds to victory in Earl Spencer's Plate over five furlongs at Northampton on 3 April, beating Pet of the Fancy (88 pounds) by a head in a "fine race". At Royal Ascot on 19 June she finished unplaced, under a weight of 117 pounds, behind Victor Wild in the Royal Hunt Cup. In her second attempt to win the Stewards' Cup she finished down the field behind Gangway on 31 July. Before the end of the year she won a handicap race at Nottingham Racecourse under a weight of 145 pounds.

== Breeding record ==
At the end of her racing career Mrs Butterwick was retired to become a broodmare for the Duke of Portland's stud. She produced at least eight foals and five winners between 1900 and 1913:

- Greatorex, a bay colt, foaled in 1900, sired by Carbine. Winner. Second in the Middle Park Stakes. Ten-time champion sire in South Africa.
- Kirkby, bay colt, 1901, by Royal Hampton.
- Wombwell, bay colt, 1903, by Isinglass. Won Hardwicke Stakes.
- Phaleron, bay colt, 1906, by Gallinule. Finished second in the 2000 Guineas and won the Jockey Club Stakes.
- Abbazia, bay filly, 1908, by Isinglass. Female-line ancestor of Singapore.
- Buttermere, brown filly, 1909, by Velocity. Female-line ancestor of Portlaw (Middle Park Stakes, Nunthorpe Stakes).
- Nilghai, brown filly, 1912, by Neil Gow.
- Tomassina, brown filly, 1913, by Long Tom

Mrs Butterwick was euthanised in November 1915.

== Pedigree ==
Pedigree of Mrs Butterwick (GB), bay mare, 1890
Sire St. Simon (GB) 1881	Galopin; 1872	Vedette	Voltigeur
Sire St. Simon (GB) 1881	Galopin; 1872	Vedette	Mrs Ridgeway
Sire St. Simon (GB) 1881	Galopin; 1872	Flying Duchess	The Flying Dutchman
Sire St. Simon (GB) 1881	Galopin; 1872	Flying Duchess	Merope
Sire St. Simon (GB) 1881	St. Angela; 1865	King Tom	Harkaway (IRE)
Sire St. Simon (GB) 1881	St. Angela; 1865	King Tom	Pocahontas
Sire St. Simon (GB) 1881	St. Angela; 1865	Adeline	Ion
Sire St. Simon (GB) 1881	St. Angela; 1865	Adeline	Little Fairy
Dam Miss Middlewick (GB) 1876	Scottish Chief; 1861	Lord of the Isles	Touchstone (horse)
Dam Miss Middlewick (GB) 1876	Scottish Chief; 1861	Lord of the Isles	Fair Helen
Dam Miss Middlewick (GB) 1876	Scottish Chief; 1861	Miss Ann	The Little Known
Dam Miss Middlewick (GB) 1876	Scottish Chief; 1861	Miss Ann	Bay Missy
Dam Miss Middlewick (GB) 1876	Violet; 1864	Thormanby	Windhound
Dam Miss Middlewick (GB) 1876	Violet; 1864	Thormanby	Alice Hawthorn
Dam Miss Middlewick (GB) 1876	Violet; 1864	Woodbine	Stockwell
Dam Miss Middlewick (GB) 1876	Violet; 1864	Woodbine	Honeysuckle (Family:8-c)
