= Colombo (horse) =

British-bred Thoroughbred racehorse

- Sire: Manna
- Grandsire: Phalaris
- Dam: Lady Nairne
- Damsire: Chaucer
- Sex: Stallion
- Foaled: March 1931
- Country: United Kingdom
- Colour: Bay
- Breeder: Sir Alec Black
- Owner: Lord Glanely
- Trainer: Thomas Hogg
- Record: 11:9-1-1
- Earnings: £26,227

Major wins
- New Stakes (1933); National Breeders' Produce Stakes (1933); Richmond Stakes (1933); Imperial Produce Stakes (1933); Craven Stakes (1934); 2000 Guineas (1934)

Awards
- Top-rated British Two-year-old (1933)

Colombo (1931–1954) was a British Thoroughbred racehorse and sire. In a career that lasted from April 1933 to June 1934 he ran eleven times and won nine races. Colombo was an outstanding two-year-old, unbeaten in seven races in 1933 and drawing comparisons with champions such as Isinglass, Persimmon and Bayardo. In 1934 he maintained his unbeaten record by winning the Craven Stakes and the 2000 Guineas at Newmarket and then finished third as the favourite in The Derby. After one more unsuccessful race he was retired to stud, where he had some success as a sire of winners until his death in 1954.

== Background ==
Colombo, a large, powerful, lop-eared horse with a "raking, effortless stride" was bred by the shipping magnate Sir Alec Black. He was bay with a white star, a white sock on his left foreleg and a white coronet on his right hind leg. Shortly after Colombo was foaled, Black decided to sell off his bloodstock and the colt was bought relatively cheaply for 510 guineas by Lord Glanely at Doncaster in 1932. Colombo was sired by Manna, the winner of the 2000 Guineas and the Epsom Derby, out of Lady Nairne, a mare who was also bought by Glanely at another one of Black's dispersal sales. Lady Nairne failed to win a race, but had a good pedigree, being a sister of the 2000 Guineas winner Ellangowan. Glanely sent Colombo to his private trainer, Captain Thomas Hogg at Newmarket, Suffolk.

== Racing career ==
=== 1933: two-year-old season ===
The horse who would become known as Colombo began his racing career as an unnamed "Colt by Manna-Lady Nairne" at Newmarket in April, winning the Spring Stakes by a head from the future 1000 Guineas winner Campanula. He appeared as Colombo for the first time on 17 May when he won the Scarborough Stakes at York. In June he was sent to Royal Ascot where he won the New Stakes, the race now known as the Norfolk Stakes, and then added the Fulbourne Stakes at Newmarket two weeks later. In July Colombo won the valuable National Breeders' Produce Stakes at Sandown "in a canter" from the filly Silver Araby. At Goodwood later that month he moved up to six furlongs for the first time in the Richmond Stakes in which he was matched against the season's other leading colt, the Coventry Stakes winner Medieval Knight. Ridden by the ten-times Champion Jockey Steve Donoghue, Colombo went to the front after a furlong and was never in any danger of defeat, beating Medieval Knight by three lengths and proving himself "vastly superior" to the opposition.

On his final start of the year he ran in the Imperial Produce Stakes at Kempton which he won in course record time by a short head from Valerius, to whom he was conceding seventeen pounds. Donoghue rode with exaggerated confidence, never resorting to the whip even when closely pressed in the final strides. Glanely was dissatisfied with Donoghue's performance and recruited the Australian rider Rae Johnstone to partner his horse in the following year's Classics. The press however, were highly impressed, and reports described Colombo as "one of the century's wonder horses" and "a perfect racing machine". The Sporting Life described him as the most impressive two-year-old since The Tetrarch and expressed the belief that his pedigree would enable him to be equally effective over longer distances in 1934. Colombo's earnings of £17,130 made him the second most successful juvenile in British racing history behind Orwell.

In the Free Handicap, a ranking of the season's best two-year-olds, Colombo was rated the best horse of his generation by a record margin of seven pounds.

=== 1934: three-year-old season ===
Reports early in 1934 suggested that Colombo had made good progress over the winter and was performing impressively in trial gallops. On his three-year-old debut at Newmarket on 19 April, Colombo was ridden by Johnstone for the first time in public and successfully moved up to one mile by winning the Craven Stakes "in a canter" by four lengths from the Aga Khan's colt Osman Pasha, who was carrying twenty pounds less than the winner. Both his physical appearance and manner of victory were highly praised by observers including the Sporting Life's correspondent. Johnstone's riding was closely scrutinised, especially by those who felt that his undoubted strength and successes in Australia and France were outweighed by his lack of British experience. Colombo then ran in the 2000 Guineas over the same course and distance two weeks later. Ridden by Johnstone, he started at odds of 2/7 against twelve opponents, making him the shortest-priced favourite since St. Frusquin in 1896. He won by a length from Easton, with Badruddin one and a half lengths further back in third.

A month later, Colombo moved up in distance to one and a half miles, and started 11/8 favourite for The Derby. Opinion before the race held that if he stayed the distance, the Derby was "all over", although it was also pointed out that several brilliant Guineas winners had failed at Epsom. The race proved to be a controversial one. Approaching the straight, Johnstone found himself boxed in against the rails, and was then forced to drop back when the horse in front of him (Medieval Knight, ridden by Steve Donoghue) weakened. He was forced to pull Colombo to the wide outside to make his challenge, by which time Windsor Lad had taken a decisive advantage. He finished strongly and took third place, one length and a neck behind Windsor Lad and Easton. Johnstone was criticised for his performance, with Donoghue in particular, making no secret of his belief that he would have won the race if he had been allowed to keep the ride. Glanely stopped using Johnstone on his horses shortly afterwards. Other observers however, felt that Johnstone had given the colt every chance to win in the straight, and that his defeat was attributable to lack of stamina, which had left him unable to use his speed in the closing stages.

Colombo's only subsequent race was the St. James's Palace Stakes at Royal Ascot in which he returned to the one mile distance. He started favourite at odds of 1/5, but failed to catch the front-running Flamenco and was beaten by half a length in what was described as "a catastrophe for the backers", who had wagered on the colt as if defeat were out of the question. He was being trained for the St Leger but sustained a knee injury and was retired to stud.

== Stud career ==
Colombo stood as a stallion at his owner's stud at Exning. He sired two classic winners in Happy Knight (2000 Guineas) and Dancing Time (1000 Guineas).

== Pedigree ==
Pedigree of Colombo (GB), bay stallion, 1931
Sire Manna (GB) 1922	Phalaris; 1913	Polymelus	Cyllene
Sire Manna (GB) 1922	Phalaris; 1913	Polymelus	Maid Marion
Sire Manna (GB) 1922	Phalaris; 1913	Bromus	Sainfoin
Sire Manna (GB) 1922	Phalaris; 1913	Bromus	Cheery
Sire Manna (GB) 1922	Waffles; 1917	Buckwheat	Martagon
Sire Manna (GB) 1922	Waffles; 1917	Buckwheat	Sesmame
Sire Manna (GB) 1922	Waffles; 1917	Lady Mischief	St. Simon*
Sire Manna (GB) 1922	Waffles; 1917	Lady Mischief	Vain Duchess
Dam Lady Nairne (GB) 1919	Chaucer; 1900	St. Simon*	Galopin
Dam Lady Nairne (GB) 1919	Chaucer; 1900	St. Simon*	St. Angela
Dam Lady Nairne (GB) 1919	Chaucer; 1900	Canterbury Pilgrim	Tristan
Dam Lady Nairne (GB) 1919	Chaucer; 1900	Canterbury Pilgrim	Pilgrimage
Dam Lady Nairne (GB) 1919	Lammermuir; 1914	Sunstar	Sundridge
Dam Lady Nairne (GB) 1919	Lammermuir; 1914	Sunstar	Doris
Dam Lady Nairne (GB) 1919	Lammermuir; 1914	Montem	Ladas
Dam Lady Nairne (GB) 1919	Lammermuir; 1914	Montem	Kermesse (Family:11-f)

- Colombo was inbred 3x4 to St. Simon, meaning that this stallion appears in both the third and fourth generations of his pedigree.
