= Bachelor's buttons =

Bachelor's buttons is a common name for several plant species bearing buttonlike heads of composite flowers

- Gomphrena canescens, native to Australia.
- Gomphrena globosa, native to Brazil, Panama and Guatemala.
- Centaurea cyanus, native to Europe, including the British Isles and cultivated as an annual ornamental plant.
- Centaurea montana, native to Europe, excluding the British Isles, and cultivated as a perennial ornamental plant.
- Kerria japonica 'Pleniflora', a double-flowered cultivar of a species native to China, Japan and Korea.
- Ranunculus aconitifolius, native to central Europe.
