= Limasol (horse) =

British-bred Thoroughbred racehorse

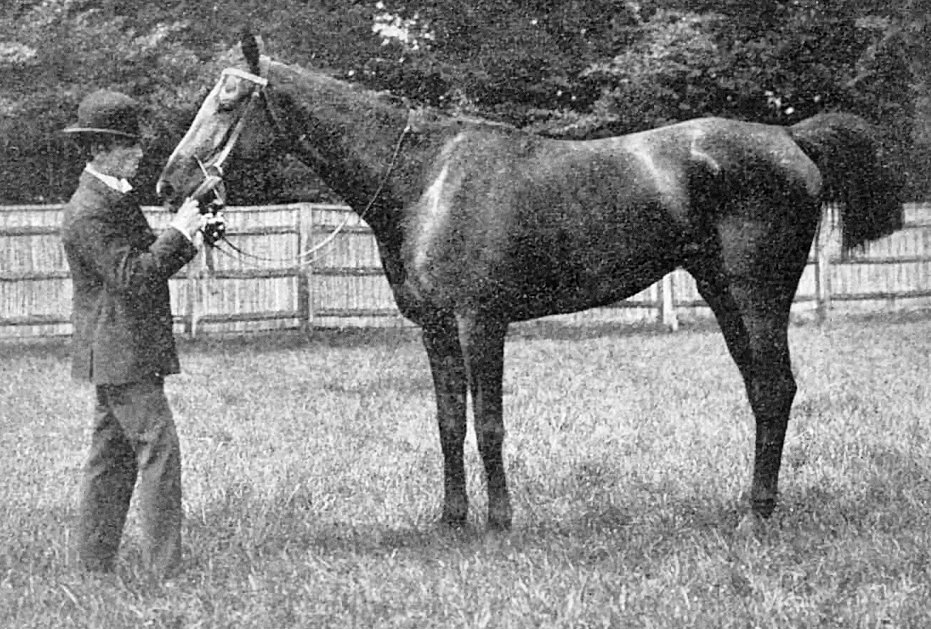
- Limasol in 1897.
- Sire: Poulet
- Grandsire: Peut Etre
- Dam: Queen of Cyprus
- Damsire: King Tom
- Sex: Mare
- Foaled: 1894
- Country: United Kingdom
- Colour: Chestnut
- Breeder: Tom Jennings Sr
- Owner: Tom Jennings Sr; Samuel Allsopp, 2nd Baron Hindlip; Leonard Brassey
- Trainer: Tom Jennings Jr
- Record: 9: 1-2-0

Major wins
- Oaks Stakes (1897)

Limasol (1894–1916) was a British Thoroughbred racehorse and broodmare. She showed promising form as a two-year-old despite failing to win any of her three starts and recorded her biggest success on her three-year-old debut when she upset the odds-on favourite Chelandry to take the Epsom Oaks. She was subsequently campaigned over extreme distances against male opposition and never won again. She made no impact as a broodmare.

== Background ==
Limasol was a chestnut mare bred in England by Tom Jennings Sr, a retired trainer best known for his handling of the great French champion Gladiateur. During her racing career she was trained by her breeder's son Tom Jennings Jr. at his Phantom House Stable in Newmarket, Suffolk.

Her sire Poulet was a French horse whose wins included the Lincolnshire Handicap and the Prix d'Ispahan as a five-year-old in 1882. He was not a popular breeding stallion; he failed to sell at auction when the bidding fell short of the reserve price of 500 guineas and at the time of Limasol's Oaks win he was standing at a fee of 25 guineas. Limasol's dam Queen of Cyprus was a stayer who finished third in the Queen Alexandra Plate and whose other descendants included the 1895 Kentucky Oaks winner Voladora. She was a granddaughter of Cyprian who won the Oaks Stakes in 1836.

== Racing career ==
=== 1896: two-year-old season ===
Limasol began her racing career in the Acorn Stakes at Epsom Racecourse in June when she finished fourth behind Fortalice. She produced her best effort later that month when running second to the three-year-old Omladina in the Fernhill Stakes at Royal Ascot. On her third and final appearance of the season she was runner-up behind All Moonshine in the Prince of Wales's Nursery Plate at Doncaster Racecourse. Before the end of 1896, Limasol was sold to Samuel Allsopp, 2nd Baron Hindlip.

=== 1897: three-year-old season ===
On 5 June Limasol was one of eight fillies to contest the 119th running of the Oaks Stakes over one and a half miles at Epsom Racecourse. The 1000 Guineas winner Chelandry was regarded as a near certainty and went off at odds of 2/5 while Limasol, partnered by Walter Bradford, started the 100/8 third choice in the betting. The other contenders included Goletta (Coventry Stakes), Cortegar, Flying Colours and Galatia (2nd in the 1000 Guineas). In a major upset Limasol led from the start, shook off a challenge from Chelandry in the straight and drew away to win by three lengths with the 40/1 outsider Fortalice taking third place.

Twelve days after her win at Epsom, Limasol was moved up in distance and started the 8/1 third favourite for the Gold Cup over two and a half miles at Ascot. After running in second place for most of the way she faltered in the straight and came home last of the four runners behind Persimmon, Winkfield's Pride and Love Wisely. Following the death of Lord Hindlip on 12 July 1897, Limasol briefly passed into the ownership of his son Charles Allsopp, 3rd Baron Hindlip. In August she was put up for auction and bought for 3,800 guineas by Leonard Brassey, a senior figure in the Jockey Club. On 13 October Limasol returned to the racecourse for the Cesarewitch Handicap over two and a quarter miles at Newmarket Racecourse in which she carried a weight of 108 pounds and finished unplaced behind the Australian five-year-old Merman.

=== 1898: four-year-old season ===
Limasol remained in training in 1898 and in May of that year she was unplaced behind Up Guards in the Chester Cup. At Royal Ascot she bypassed the Gold Cup to contest the Ascot Stakes on 14 June and the three mile Alexandra Plate three days later but after running unplaced behind the four-year-old colt Herminius in the former race she came home last of the six runners behind Piety in the latter. It was later reported that repeated runs over long distances on hard ground had rendered her "useless for racing".

== Breeding record ==
At the end of her racing career Limasol was retired to become a broodmare. She was euthanized in 1916 after aborting a foal. She produced at least seven foals:

- Bric-a-Brac II, a chestnut filly, foaled in 1899, sired by Worcester
- Levant, a bay colt, foaled in 1900, sired by Bay Ronald
- Vesper, a brown filly, foaled in 1901, sired by St Frusquin
- Teucer, Chestnut colt, foaled in 1904, sired by Florizel II
- Harbour Light, chestnut filly, 1911, by Sundridge
- Lady Limasol, foaled in 1913, sired by Boar's Head (sent to Australia)
- Brown gelding, foaled in 1915, sired by St Girons

== Pedigree ==
Pedigree of Limasol (GB), chestnut mare, 1894
Sire Poulet (FR) 1877	Peut Etre; 1871	Ventre St Gris	Gladiator (GB)
Sire Poulet (FR) 1877	Peut Etre; 1871	Ventre St Gris	Belle de Nuit
Sire Poulet (FR) 1877	Peut Etre; 1871	Favorite	Cossack (GB)
Sire Poulet (FR) 1877	Peut Etre; 1871	Favorite	Hervine
Sire Poulet (FR) 1877	Printaniere; 1872	Chattanooga (GB)	Orlando
Sire Poulet (FR) 1877	Printaniere; 1872	Chattanooga (GB)	Ayacanora
Sire Poulet (FR) 1877	Printaniere; 1872	Summerside (GB)	West Australian
Sire Poulet (FR) 1877	Printaniere; 1872	Summerside (GB)	Ellerdale
Dam Queen of Cyprus (GB) 1873	King Tom; 1851	Harkaway (IRE)	Economist (GB)
Dam Queen of Cyprus (GB) 1873	King Tom; 1851	Harkaway (IRE)	Fanny Dawson
Dam Queen of Cyprus (GB) 1873	King Tom; 1851	Pocahontas	Glencoe
Dam Queen of Cyprus (GB) 1873	King Tom; 1851	Pocahontas	Marpessa
Dam Queen of Cyprus (GB) 1873	Cypriana; 1852	Epirus	Langar
Dam Queen of Cyprus (GB) 1873	Cypriana; 1852	Epirus	Olympia
Dam Queen of Cyprus (GB) 1873	Cypriana; 1852	Cyprian	Partisan
Dam Queen of Cyprus (GB) 1873	Cypriana; 1852	Cyprian	Frailty (Family: 23-a)
