= Dancing Time =

British-bred Thoroughbred racehorse

- Sire: Colombo
- Grandsire: Manna
- Dam: Show Girl
- Damsire: Son-in-Law
- Sex: Mare
- Foaled: 1938
- Country: United Kingdom
- Colour: Bay
- Breeder: William Tatem, 1st Baron Glanely
- Owner: William Tatem, 1st Baron Glanely
- Trainer: Joseph Lawson
- Record: 4: 1-0-1

Major wins
- 1000 Guineas Stakes (1941)

Dancing Time (1938–1958) was a British Thoroughbred racehorse and broodmare, who raced during World War II and was best known for winning the classic 1000 Guineas in 1941. After finishing unplaced in her only race as a two-year-old, the filly won the 1000 Guineas on the July course at Newmarket on her three-year-old debut. She later finished third in both the Oaks Stakes and the St Leger. After her retirement from racing she became a successful broodmare.

== Background ==
Dancing Time was a bay mare, bred by her owner William Tatem, 1st Baron Glanely. She was the first of two classic winners sired by Colombo an outstanding two-year-old who went on to win the 2000 Guineas in 1934. Dancing Time was the third of four foals produced by her dam Show Girl, a high-class staying racemare who won the Northumberland Plate in 1930. Show Girl's dam Comedy Star was a half-sister to The Derby winner Call Boy. Lord Glanely sent the filly into training with Joseph Lawson at his stables at Manton in Wiltshire.

Dancing Time's racing career took place during World War II during which horse racing in Britain was subject to many restrictions. Several major racecourses, including Epsom and Doncaster, were closed for the duration of the conflict, either for safety reasons, or because they were being used by the military. Many important races were rescheduled to new dates and venues, often at short notice, and all five of the Classics were usually run at Newmarket. Wartime austerity also meant that prize money was reduced: Dancing Time's 1000 Guineas was worth £1,184 compared to the £7,592 earned by Galatea in 1939.

== Racing career ==
As a two-year-old in 1940, Dancing Time finished unplaced in her only racecourse appearance, a maiden race in June. On 1 May 1941, in only her second race, Dancing Time contested the 128th running of the 1000 Guineas which was run over the July course at Newmarket rather than its traditional home on the Rowley Mile. Ridden by Dick Perryman she started at odds of 100/8 in thirteen-runner field. Racing on firm ground she won by a length from Beausite, with Keystone two lengths away in third place.

On 19 June at the same course, Dancing Time started odds-on favourite for the substitute "New Oaks" over one and a half miles. She never looked like winning and finished third of the twelve runners, beaten two lengths and three-quarters of a length by Commotion and Turkana. With Doncaster Racecourse unavailable, a substitute "New St Leger" was run over one and three quarter miles at Manchester on 6 September. Racing against colts, Dancing Time finished third behind Sun Castle and Chateau Larose, beaten a head and a length.

== Assessment ==
In their book A Century of Champions, based on a modified version of the Timeform system, John Randall and Tony Morris rated Dancing Time an "average" winner of the 1000 Guineas.

== Breeding record ==
Dancing Time was retired from racing to become a broodmare. In June 1942 Lord Glanely was killed in an air-raid and the mare was offered for sale and bought for 4,600 guineas by Joseph McGrath. She had considerable success in the breeding paddocks, producing six winners from nine foals, the best being Arctic Time, a colt who won the Beresford Stakes and the Gallinule Stakes. Her unraced daughter Star Dancer became a successful broodmare.

Her recorded foals were:

- Young Affran, a dark bay or brown colt, foaled in 1944, sired by Windsor Slipper. Winner.
- Royal Ballet, dark bay or brown colt, 1945, by Windsor Slipper. Winner.
- Bear Dance, brown colt, 1946, by Big Game. Winner.
- Dainty Dancer, bay filly, 1947, by Dante. Winner.
- Ituna, brown filly, 1949, by Dante. Winner.
- French Ballet, bay filly, 1950, by Prince Chevaler
- Arctic Time, bay colt, 1952, by Arctic Star. Won Beresford Stakes, Gallinule Stakes.
- Let It Be Me, brown filly, 1953, by Arctic Star
- Star Dancer, brown filly, 1954, by Arctic Star. Unraced. Dam of Royal Danseuse Irish 1000 Guineas

== Pedigree ==
Pedigree of Dancing Time (GB), bay mare, 1938
Sire Colombo (GB) 1931	Manna (IRE); 1922	Phalaris	Polymelus
Sire Colombo (GB) 1931	Manna (IRE); 1922	Phalaris	Bromus
Sire Colombo (GB) 1931	Manna (IRE); 1922	Waffles	Buckwheat
Sire Colombo (GB) 1931	Manna (IRE); 1922	Waffles	Lady Mischief
Sire Colombo (GB) 1931	Lady Nairne (GB); 1919	Chaucer	St Simon
Sire Colombo (GB) 1931	Lady Nairne (GB); 1919	Chaucer	Canterbury Pilgrim
Sire Colombo (GB) 1931	Lady Nairne (GB); 1919	Lammermuir	Sunstar
Sire Colombo (GB) 1931	Lady Nairne (GB); 1919	Lammermuir	Montem
Dam Show Girl (GB) 1926	Son-in-Law (GB); 1911	Dark Ronald	Bay Ronald
Dam Show Girl (GB) 1926	Son-in-Law (GB); 1911	Dark Ronald	Darkie
Dam Show Girl (GB) 1926	Son-in-Law (GB); 1911	Mother-in-Law	Matchmaker
Dam Show Girl (GB) 1926	Son-in-Law (GB); 1911	Mother-in-Law	Be Cannie
Dam Show Girl (GB) 1926	Comedy Star (GB); 1921	Sunstar	Sundridge
Dam Show Girl (GB) 1926	Comedy Star (GB); 1921	Sunstar	Doris
Dam Show Girl (GB) 1926	Comedy Star (GB); 1921	Comedienne	Bachelor's Double
Dam Show Girl (GB) 1926	Comedy Star (GB); 1921	Comedienne	Altoviscar (Family 2-f)
