= William Tatem, 1st Baron Glanely =

British baron

The Lord Glanely DL
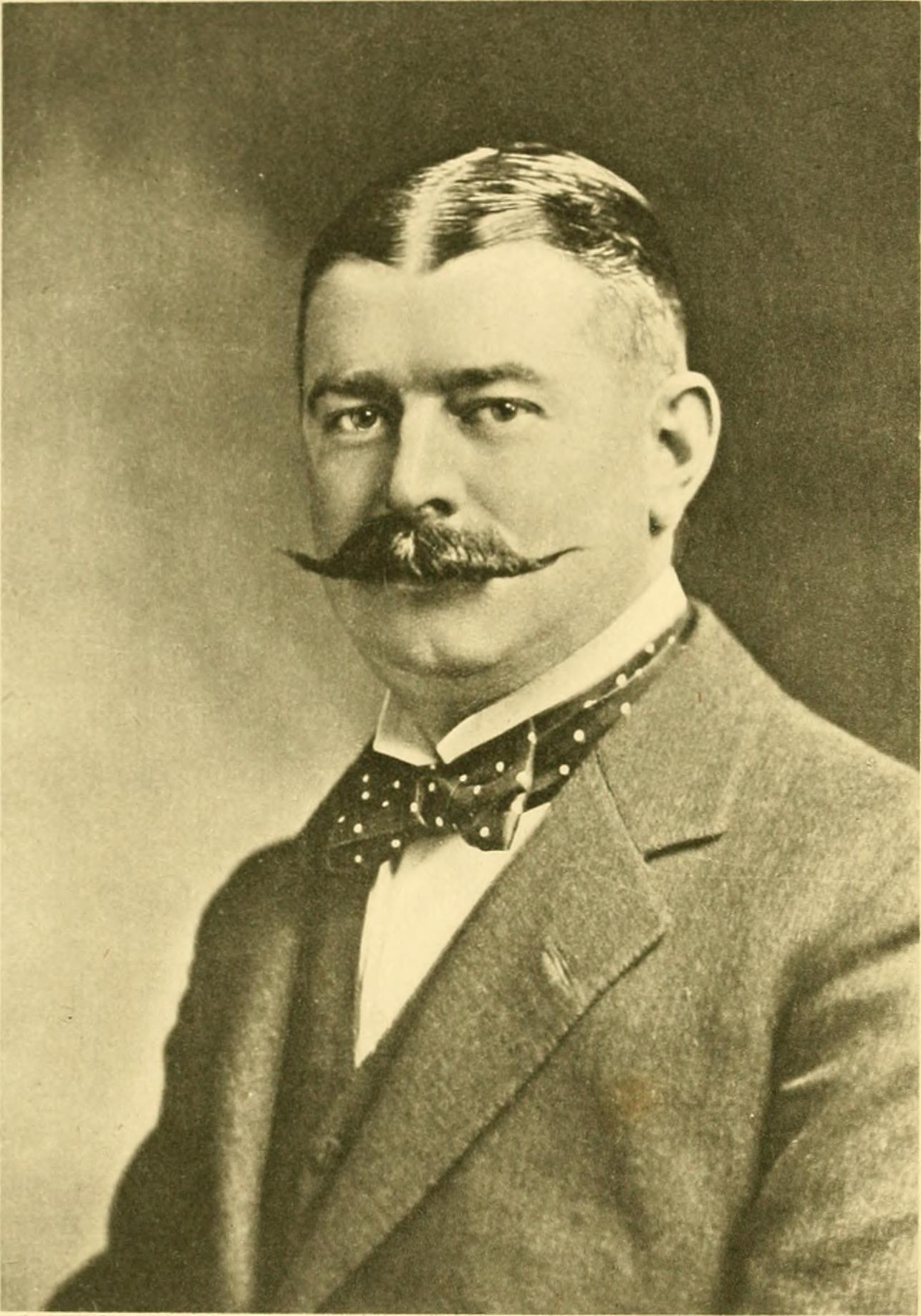
- Born: William Tatem; 6 March 1868; Appledore, England
- Died: 28 June 1942 (aged 74); Weston-Super-Mare, England
- Occupations: Ship-owner, Race horse breeder
- Spouse: Ada Mary Williams (1897-1930; her death)
- Children: 1

William James Tatem, 1st Baron Glanely DL (6 March 1868 – 28 June 1942), known as Sir William Tatem, Bt, between 1916 and 1918, was a Welsh ship-owner and thoroughbred racehorse owner and breeder.

== Career ==
Tatem was born in Appledore, North Devon from where he originally went to sea. He moved to Cardiff at the age of 18 and began work at the shipping offices of Anning Brothers. In 1897 he founded the Lady Lewis Steamship Company with a ship of that name and in 1910 this became the Tatem Steam Ship Company.

He became, in addition to that company, chairman of the Atlantic Shipping and Trading company, Dulverton Steamship company, the West of England Steamship Owners' Protection and Indemnity Association, and the British Corporation for Registration of Shipping and Aircraft. He was chairman of the Cardiff Shipowners' Association in 1907 and President of the Institute of Chartered Shipbrokers in 1935.

He also came to have directorships in other industries in south Wales and elsewhere. He was chairman of Crosswells Brewery in Cardiff and director of the Cardiff Docks and Railways company, Rhymney Railway company, the Great Western Railway company, Anglo-Ecuadorian Oilfields and Lobitos Oilfields Ltd, Mount Stuart Drydocks Ltd, and Cardiff Exchange Co Ltd.

Tatem was a DL and JP for the county of Glamorgan, of which he became High Sheriff in 1911, as well as becoming a JP for Wiltshire in 1922.

He was created a Baronet in 1916 and raised to the peerage as Baron Glanely, of St. Fagans in the County of Glamorgan, on 28 June 1918.

== Philanthropy ==
Tatem was a benefactor of Cardiff University Cardiff, then known as the University College of South Wales and Monmouthshire and donated the money to build the 1904 Chemistry and Physics block. He was president of the University College from 1920 to 1925, and again from 1934 until 1942. In 1928, he became an honorary Freeman of the City of Cardiff.

He provided £10,000 for the construction of a new church for the Ely district of Cardiff, the Church of the Resurrection, in memory of his wife, Ada Mary. The church was consecrated in 1934.

He was governor of Cardiff Royal Infirmary and President of the Royal Hamadryad Seamen's Hospital.

== Spanish Civil War ==
During the Spanish Civil War, Glanely was part of widespread Welsh support for the Spanish Republic. In 1937, he helped the National Joint Committee for Spanish Relief to open a home at Cambria House, Caerleon for 50 Basque child refugees. He let the Basque Government charter his two oldest steamships, SS Molton and SS Pilton, to bring Republican refugees out of the Republican-held part of northern Spain, which was encircled by insurgent forces.

On 14 July, Molton tried to enter Republican-held Santander but the insurgent cruiser Almirante Cervera captured her and the insurgent armed trawler Galerna took Molton to Bilbao, which by then had fallen to Franco's forces.

Pilton was more successful, firstly carrying many refugees out of Santander, and then, on 27 July 1937, bringing refugees from Avilés to France.

== Thoroughbred horse racing ==
In the interwar period he was one of the leading owners in British flat racing. He bought Exning House at Exning, near Newmarket and the nearby Lagrange stables in 1919 and maintained the stables until it was requisitioned by the British Army in 1939. He was British flat racing Champion Owner in 1919 and 1941, and was elected to the Jockey Club in 1929. His racing colours were black jacket, red, white and blue belt and cap. He was chairman of the companies owning Cardiff and Chepstow racecourses.

His horses won six British Classic Races:

- Epsom Derby – Grand Parade (1919)
- Epsom Oaks – Rose of England (1930)
- 2,000 Guineas – Colombo (1934)
- 1,000 Guineas – Dancing Time (1941)
- St. Leger – Singapore (1930), Chulmleigh, (1937)

== Personal life ==
Tatem married, on 14 September 1897, Ada Mary, daughter of Thomas Williams of Cardiff, Wales. The couple had one son, Thomas Shandon Tatem, born 20 July 1898, who died on 14 June 1905 aged six years.

Lady Glanely died on 10 April 1930 after sustaining injuries in a car accident. Lord Glanely was killed during World War II in an air-raid in Weston-super-Mare in June 1942, aged 74, when, having no surviving heir, his titles became extinct. He was buried in Cathays Cemetery, Cardiff.

== Sources ==
- Heaton, Paul M (2006). Spanish Civil War Blockade Runners. Abergavenny: P.M. Heaton Publishing. pp. 59–63. ISBN 1-872006-21-3.
- Wright, Howard (1986). The Encyclopedia of Flat Racing. Robert Hale. pp. 107–108. ISBN 0-7090-2639-0.
- Leigh Rayment's Peerage Pages – Peerages beginning with "G" (part 1)
- Lord Glanely profile, National Horseracing Museum website
- History of Cardiff shipping companies
- History of education in Cardiff
- Hesilrige, Arthur G. M. (1921). Debrett's Peerage and Titles of courtesy. London: Dean & Son. p. 400.

Peerage of the United Kingdom
New creation	Baron Glanely; 1918–1942	Extinct
Baronetage of the United Kingdom
New creation	Baronet (of St Fagans); 1916–1942	Extinct
