= Singapore (horse) =

British-bred Thoroughbred racehorse

- Sire: Gainsborough
- Grandsire: Bayardo
- Dam: Tetrabbazia
- Damsire: The Tetrarch
- Sex: Stallion
- Foaled: 1927
- Country: United Kingdom
- Colour: Bay
- Breeder: Alec Black
- Owner: William Tatem, 1st Baron Glanely
- Trainer: Thomas Hogg
- Record: 11: 3-2-0
- Earnings: £13,006

Major wins
- St Leger (1930); Doncaster Cup (1931)

Singapore (1927 – after 1946) was a British Thoroughbred racehorse and sire. Unraced as a two-year-old, he was beaten in his first three starts in 1930 before winning a race at Sandown Park. He continued his progress and recorded his biggest win in September when he took the St Leger Stakes at Doncaster Racecourse. As a four-year-old he appeared to be a very unlucky loser when narrowly beaten in the Ascot Gold Cup and was an easy winner of the Doncaster Cup in autumn. After his retirement from racing he stood as a breeding stallion in England and Brazil.

== Background ==
Singapore was a bay horse with a white star bred in England by Sir Alec Black at the Compton Stud in Suffolk. As a yearling he was put up for auction and bought by William Tatem, 1st Baron Glanely for 12,500 guineas with Cecil Boyd-Rochfort being the underbidder. The price was the highest paid for any male yearling in Britain in 1928. Lord Glanely explained "I bought him not only because of his good looks, but because I thought he would one day make a good stallion." The colt was sent into training with Lord Glanely's private trainer Thomas Hogg at Newmarket, Suffolk.

He was sired by Gainsborough who won the wartime Triple Crown in 1918 and went on to sire numerous good winners including Hyperion, Solario and Orwell. Singapore's dam Tetrabazzia won three races and was a granddaughter of the Epsom Oaks winner Mrs Butterwick.

== Racing career ==
=== 1930: three-year-old season ===
Singapore "met with an accident" in 1929 and did not race as a two-year-old. He made his track debut in April 1930 when he was unplaced behind Christopher Robin in the Greenham Stakes at Newbury Racecourse and then finished well down the field in the 2000 Guineas which was won by Diolite. He missed the Derby and reappeared in the St James's Palace Stakes at Royal Ascot and came home fourth behind Christopher Robin who won from Rustom Pasha. On 27 June he recorded his first success at his fourth attempt when he won the £1,000 Sandringham Foal Plate at Sandown Park. A month later he was narrowly beaten in the Gratwicke Produce Stakes at Goodwood Racecourse when attempting to concede ten pounds to the winner Ramesses the Second.

At Doncaster Racecourse on 10 September Singapore, ridden by Gordon Richards, started the 4/1 joint-favourite alongside Parenthesis in a thirteen-runner field for the 155th running of the St Leger. The other contenders included Diolite, Ut Majeur and Rustom Pasha, who had defeated older horses to win the Eclipse Stakes but the field was considered a substandard one by St Leger standards. Singapore took the lead from Parenthesis a furlong from the finish and won by one and a half lengths with Rustom Pasha three quarters of a length away in third. Richards reported that he had been confident of winning at every stage of the race.

On his final appearance of 1930, the colt was dropped back in distance for the ten furlong Champion Stakes at Newmarket but finished unplaced behind Rustom Pasha. He ended the year with earnings of £11,616, making him the second most financially successful horse of the season.

=== 1931: four-year-old season ===
Singapore was kept in training as a four-year-old with the Ascot Gold Cup as his main objective. The 1931 Gold Cup on 18 June proved to be a highly controversial race which saw Singapore (ridden by Richards) beaten a short head by Trimdon after being barged into the rails by the winner inside the final furlong. Trimdon's rider Joe Childs had dropped his whip and was unable to prevent his mount from veering to the right in the closing stages. The racecourse stewards did not hold an inquiry and Lord Glanely declined to lodge an objection as to do so would have been seen a breach of etiquette at the Royal meeting. Singapore was subsequently brought back in distance for the Eclipse Stakes over ten furlongs at Sandown but finished unplaced behind the 25/1 outsider Caerleon.

On 11 September, Singapore returned to the scene of his St Leger success to contest the Doncaster Cup over two and a quarter miles. Ridden as usual by Richards, he started the 13/8 favourite and won very easily by four lengths from the seven-year-old gelding Brown Jack. He crossed the line still under restraint from Richards and Lord Glanely commented that his trainer had never been so confident of winning a race. Singapore broke down on hard ground in the Jockey Club Stakes at Newmarket in October and was retired from racing.

== Assessment and honours ==
In their book, A Century of Champions, based on the Timeform rating system, John Randall and Tony Morris rated Singapore an "average" winner of the St Leger.

== Stud record ==
At the end of his racing career, Singapore became a breeding stallion in England before being exported to Brazil in 1943. The best of his offspring was the St Leger winner Chulmleigh. His other foals included Indian Call, the dam of Ballymoss.

== Sire line tree ==
- Singapore
  - Chulmleigh
    - Whiteway
  - Skoiter
    - Sunsalve
  - Arco
    - Scanno
      - Rivisondoli
    - Scai

== Pedigree ==
Pedigree of Singapore (GB), bay stallion, 1927
Sire Gainsborough (GB) 1915	Bayardo (GB); 1906	Bay Ronald	Hampton
Sire Gainsborough (GB) 1915	Bayardo (GB); 1906	Bay Ronald	Black Duchess
Sire Gainsborough (GB) 1915	Bayardo (GB); 1906	Galicia	Galopin*
Sire Gainsborough (GB) 1915	Bayardo (GB); 1906	Galicia	Isoletta*
Sire Gainsborough (GB) 1915	Rosedrop (GB); 1907	St. Frusquin	St Simon*
Sire Gainsborough (GB) 1915	Rosedrop (GB); 1907	St. Frusquin	Isabel
Sire Gainsborough (GB) 1915	Rosedrop (GB); 1907	Rosaline	Trenton (NZ)
Sire Gainsborough (GB) 1915	Rosedrop (GB); 1907	Rosaline	Rosalys
Dam Tetrabbazia (IRE) 1918	The Tetrarch (IRE); 1911	Roi Herode (FR)	Le Samaritain
Dam Tetrabbazia (IRE) 1918	The Tetrarch (IRE); 1911	Roi Herode (FR)	Roxelane
Dam Tetrabbazia (IRE) 1918	The Tetrarch (IRE); 1911	Vahren (GB)	Bona Vista
Dam Tetrabbazia (IRE) 1918	The Tetrarch (IRE); 1911	Vahren (GB)	Castania
Dam Tetrabbazia (IRE) 1918	Abbazia (GB); 1908	Isinglass	Isonomy*
Dam Tetrabbazia (IRE) 1918	Abbazia (GB); 1908	Isinglass	Dead Lock
Dam Tetrabbazia (IRE) 1918	Abbazia (GB); 1908	Mrs Butterwick	St Simon*
Dam Tetrabbazia (IRE) 1918	Abbazia (GB); 1908	Mrs Butterwick	Miss Middlewick (Family: 8-c)

* Singapore is inbred 4S x 5S x 5D to the stallion Galopin, meaning that he appears fourth generation and fifth generation (via St Simon) on the sire side of his pedigree, and fifth generation (via St Simon) on the dam side of his pedigree.

* Singapore is inbred 4S x 4D to the stallion St Simon, meaning that he appears fourth generation on the sire side of his pedigree, and fourth generation on the dam side of his pedigree.

* Singapore is inbred 5S x 4D to the stallion Isonomy, meaning that he appears fifth generation (via Isoletta) on the sire side of his pedigree, and fourth generation on the dam side of his pedigree.
