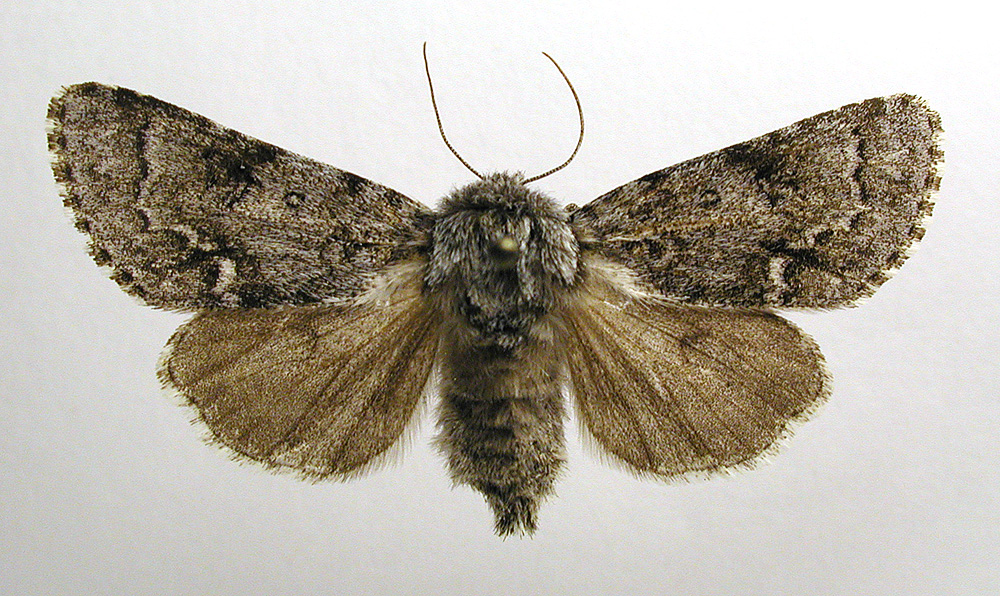

Scientific classification
- Kingdom: Animalia
- Phylum: Arthropoda
- Clade: Pancrustacea
- Class: Insecta
- Order: Lepidoptera
- Superfamily: Noctuoidea
- Family: Noctuidae
- Genus: Acronicta
- Species: A. menyanthidis

Binomial name
- Acronicta menyanthidis (Esper, 1789)

= Acronicta menyanthidis =

Species of moth

Acronicta menyanthidis, the light knot grass, is a moth of the family Noctuidae. It is distributed through northern, central and eastern Europe, east to Siberia and the Russian Far East.

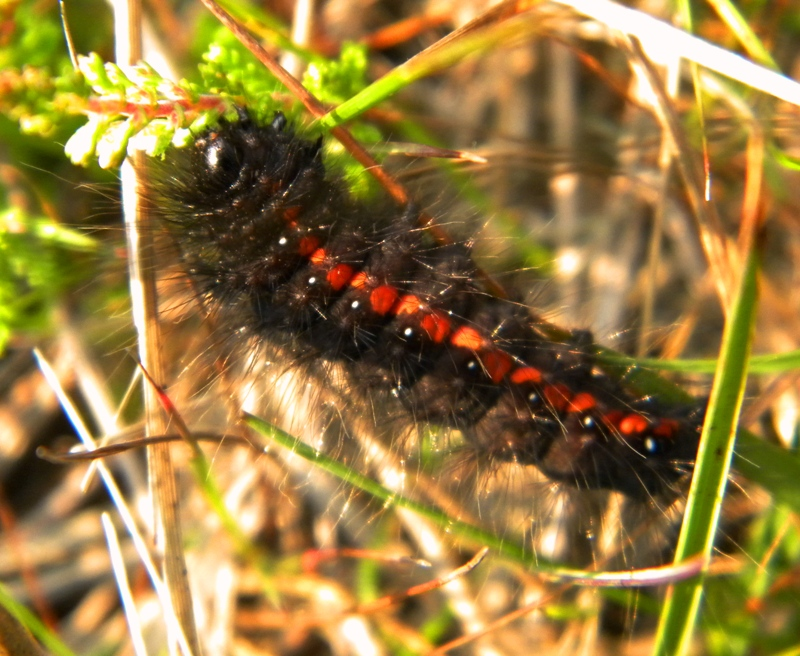
Larva

The wingspan is 33–41 mm. Forewing bluish white, dusted and shaded with dark grey; a short black streak from near base; marginal area darker, sometimes blackish, grey; orbicular stigma quite small.- In the ab. suffusa Tutt the whole forewing is suffused with dark grey. - ab. obsoleta Tutt has the forewing quite pale with all markings faint; on the contrary ab. scotica Tuff from the west coast of Scotland is larger and brighter than the type, with all markings clear and distinct.

The adults fly at night from May to July. They are attracted to light.

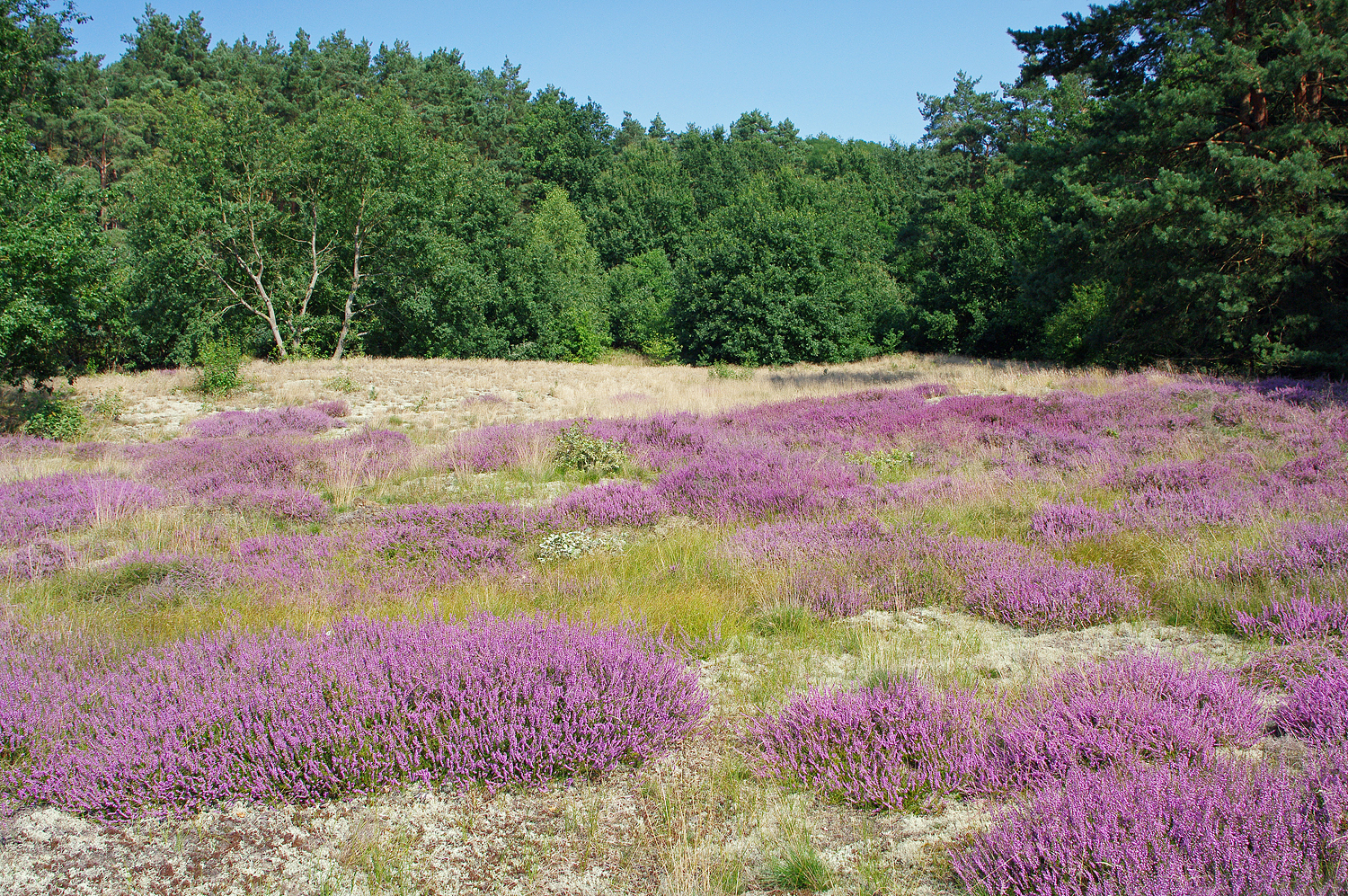
Habitat in Germany

Recorded food plants include Myrica, Calluna, Vaccinium, Salix, Betula, Ranunculus aconitifolius, Comarum palustre, Lysimachia nummularia and Menyanthes trifoliata.

1. The flight season refers to the British Isles. This may vary in other parts of the range.
