= Church of the Resurrection, Ely =

Church in Cardiff, Wales

Church of the Resurrection
- The Res Ely
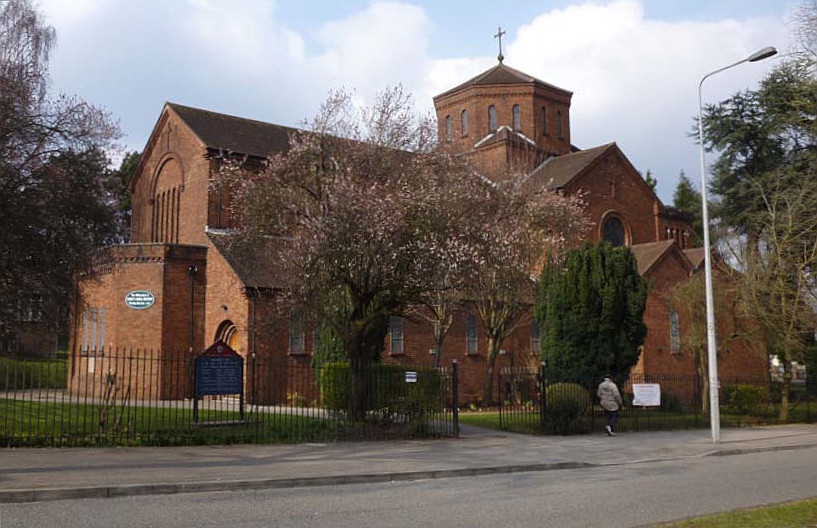
- Church of the Resurrection
- 51.4793°N 3.2504°W
- Denomination: Anglican (Church in Wales)
- Churchmanship: Central catholic
- Website: https://theresely.org

History
- Status: Active
- Consecrated: 9 October 1934

Architecture
- Functional status: Parish church
- Heritage designation: Grade II
- Designated: 9 October 2001
- Architect(s): Thomas Roderick & Sons of Aberdare
- Architectural type: Byzantine
- Groundbreaking: 24 January 1934
- Completed: October 1934
- Construction cost: £10,000

Specifications
- Capacity: 600
- Materials: brick

Administration
- Division: Part of the West Cardiff Ministry Area
- Diocese: Llandaff
- Archdeaconry: Llandaff
- Deanery: Llandaff
- Parish: Part of the West Cardiff Ministry Area

The Church of the Resurrection is a listed Anglican church in the suburb of Ely, Cardiff.

== History ==
Historically part of the Parish of Llandaff, the hamlet of Ely was transferred to the parish of St Mary the Virgin in 1869. In 1871, the small mission church of St David's was built to serve Ely. In the early years of the 20th Century, a further mission was founded in the shape of a tin tabernacle, staffed by the Community of the Resurrection and members of the Church Army. In 1933, plans were under consideration for St David's to be purchased (subject to the agreement of the parish) by Cardiff Corporation for use by the residents of Ely Lodge Public Assistance Institution (later Ely Hospital, a hospice and mental health facility). If this were to proceed, the plans proposed to replace both St David's and the tin tabernacle with a single new church for the whole of Ely. The original designs of 1933 envisaged a church capable of seating 500 at a cost of £5000, but these were eventually superseded by a grander design by Thomas Roderick seating 600 which Lord Glanely wished to present to the parish as a gift in memory of his deceased wife. The church, built at the location of the tin tabernacle to a Neo-Byzantine style, was consecrated in October 1934. Its apse has five stained glass windows by Francis Spear, installed in 1947.

In the event, St David's continued to be used for public services. The Church of the Resurrection is now part of the West Cardiff Ministry Area. St David's remained in the parish of Caerau as a daughter church, even though St Mary's was becoming increasingly rundown. An additional church, St Timothy's, was founded in 1957 in response to the growing urbanisation and the poor condition of St Mary's. In 1973, St Mary's closed and St David's became the parish church, though is now also part of the West Cardiff Ministry Area. St Timothy's closed in February 2023. Information about The Church of the Resurrection can be found on its website www.theresely.org

== Listing ==
The Church became listed in 2001.
