= Commotion (horse) =

British-bred Thoroughbred racehorse

- Sire: Mieuxce
- Grandsire: Massine
- Dam: Riot
- Damsire: Colorado
- Sex: Mare
- Foaled: 1938
- Country: United Kingdom
- Colour: Bay
- Breeder: John Arthur Dewar
- Owner: John Arthur Dewar
- Trainer: Fred Darling
- Record: 2 wins

Major wins
- New Oaks (1941); Falmouth Stakes (1941)

Commotion (1938 – 1960) was a British Thoroughbred racehorse and broodmare who raced during World War II and was best known for winning the classic Oaks Stakes in 1941. After racing over sprint distances, she was stepped up in distance the substitute "New Oaks" over one and a half miles at Newmarket Racecourse. On her next appearance she won the Falmouth Stakes and was then retired from racing. She later became a very successful broodmare.

== Background ==
Commotion was a bay filly bred in England by John Arthur Dewar who had inherited his Thoroughbred racehorses from his uncle the Scottish whisky distiller Thomas Dewar, 1st Baron Dewar. She was from the first crop of foals sired by the French stallion Mieuxce, who won the Prix du Jockey Club and the Grand Prix de Paris before his racing career was ended by injury. Commotion's dam Riot was a half-sister to both Sansonnet (who produced Tudor Minstrel) and Fair Trial as well as being a high-class racehorse in her own right, winning the July Stakes in 1931. Commotion was sent into training with Fred Darling at Beckhampton, Wiltshire.

Commotion's racing career took place during World War II during which horse racing in Britain was subject to many restrictions. Several major racecourses, including Epsom and Doncaster, were closed for the duration of the conflict, either for safety reasons, or because they were being used by the military. Many important races were rescheduled to new dates and venues, often at short notice, and all five of the Classics were usually run at Newmarket. Wartime austerity also meant that prize money was reduced: Commotion's Oaks was worth £1,939 compared to the £8,043 earned by Galatea in 1939.

== Racing career ==
With Epsom Racecourse unavailable in 1941, a substitute "New Oaks" was run over one and a half miles on the July course at Newmarket Racecourse on 19 June. Commotion was well-backed for the race despite never previously having raced beyond six furlongs. Ridden by Harry Wragg, she started at odds of 8/1 with the 1000 Guineas winner Dancing Time starting odds-on favourite. Wragg, who was a specialist at waiting tactics, restrained the filly in the early stages before producing her with a strong late run. She "threaded her way through the field" to take the lead in the final furlong and won by two lengths from Turkana, with Dancing Time three-quarters of a length away in third. Following the Derby victory of Owen Tudor, owned by a member of the Buchanan family, Commotion's success completed what was dubbed a "whisky double".

At Newmarket in July Commotion started 6/5 favourite for the Falmouth Stakes which was run as part of a substitute Royal Ascot meeting. She won narrowly from 1000 Guineas runner-up Beausite with Turkana third.

== Assessment ==
At the end of 1941, Commotion was rated the best three-year-old filly in Britain, three pounds ahead of Dancing Time.

In their book A Century of Champions, based on a modified version of the Timeform system, John Randall and Tony Morris rated Commotion an "average" winner of the Oaks.

== Breeding record ==
Commotion produced eight winners between 1943 and 1958 including three top-class performers before her death in 1960:

- Combat, a brown colt, foaled in 1944, sired by Big Game. Undefeated winner of nine races including the Sussex Stakes.
- Faux Tirage, bay colt, 1946, by Big Game. Won Newmarket Stakes, St James's Palace Stakes
- Aristophanes, chestnut colt, 1948, by Hyperion. Champion sire in Argentina, sire of Forli

== Pedigree ==
Pedigree of Commotion (GB), bay mare, 1938
Sire Mieuxce (FR) 1933	Massine (FR); 1920	Consols	Doricles
Sire Mieuxce (FR) 1933	Massine (FR); 1920	Consols	Console
Sire Mieuxce (FR) 1933	Massine (FR); 1920	Mauri	Ajax
Sire Mieuxce (FR) 1933	Massine (FR); 1920	Mauri	La Camargo
Sire Mieuxce (FR) 1933	L'Olivete (FR); 1925	Opott	Maximum
Sire Mieuxce (FR) 1933	L'Olivete (FR); 1925	Opott	Oussouri
Sire Mieuxce (FR) 1933	L'Olivete (FR); 1925	Jonicole	Saint Just
Sire Mieuxce (FR) 1933	L'Olivete (FR); 1925	Jonicole	Sainte Etoile
Dam Riot (GB) 1929	Colorado (GB); 1923	Phalaris	Polymelus
Dam Riot (GB) 1929	Colorado (GB); 1923	Phalaris	Bromus
Dam Riot (GB) 1929	Colorado (GB); 1923	Canyon	Chaucer
Dam Riot (GB) 1929	Colorado (GB); 1923	Canyon	Glasalt
Dam Riot (GB) 1929	Lady Juror (GB); 1919	Son-in-Law	Dark Ronald
Dam Riot (GB) 1929	Lady Juror (GB); 1919	Son-in-Law	Mother in Law
Dam Riot (GB) 1929	Lady Juror (GB); 1919	Lady Josephine	Sundridge
Dam Riot (GB) 1929	Lady Juror (GB); 1919	Lady Josephine	Americus Girl (Family 9-c)
