= Chelandry =

British Thoroughbred racehorse

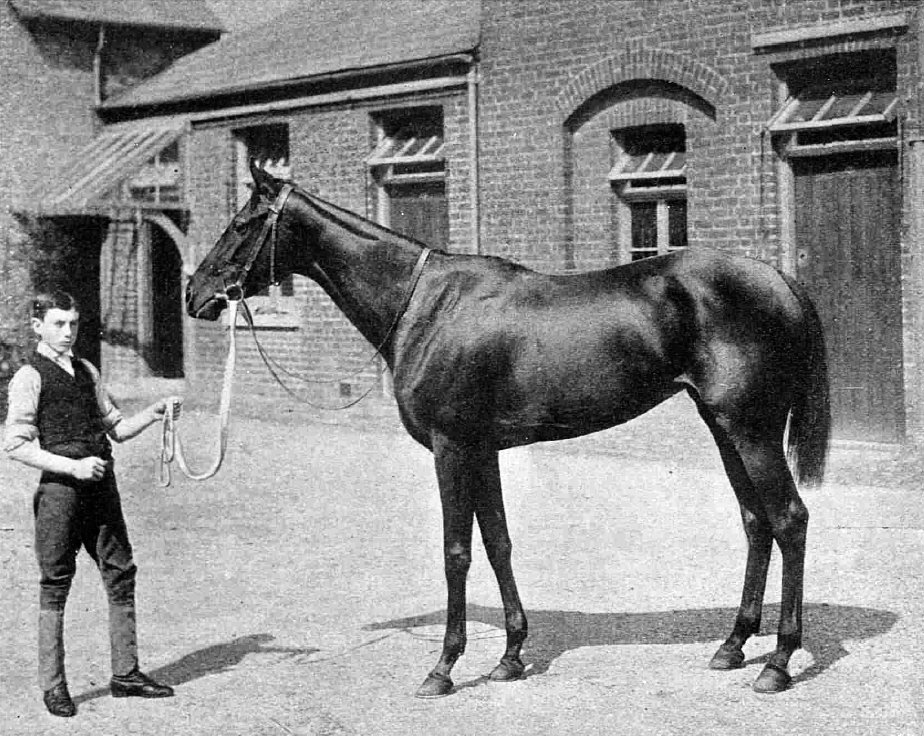
- Chelandry in 1897.
- Sire: Goldfinch
- Grandsire: Ormonde
- Dam: Illuminata
- Damsire: Rosicrucian
- Sex: Mare
- Foaled: 1894
- Country: United Kingdom
- Colour: Bay
- Breeder: Lord Rosebery
- Owner: Lord Rosebery
- Trainer: William Walters Jr
- Record: 15: 5-3-2

Major wins
- Woodcote Stakes (1896); Great Surrey Breeders' Foal Plate (1896); National Breeders' Produce Stakes (1896); Imperial Produce Stakes (1896); 1000 Guineas (1897)

Awards
- Top-rated 2-y-o filly in England (1896)

Chelandry (1894–1917) was a British Thoroughbred racehorse and broodmare. She was the top-rated juvenile filly in England in 1896 when she won the Woodcote Stakes, Great Surrey Breeders' Foal Plate, National Breeders' Produce Stakes and Imperial Produce Stakes. In the following year she won the 1000 Guineas and finished second in both the Epsom Oaks and the St Leger. She remained in training as a four-year-old but failed to win again and was retired at the end of the year. After her retirement from racing, she became an exceptionally successful and influential broodmare.

== Background ==
Chelandry was a bay mare bred in England by her owner Lord Rosebery. She was trained throughout her racing career by William Walters Jr. She was not a physically impressive specimen, being variously described as "mean-looking", "wiry", and a "common-looking little filly".

She was from the first, and only European crop of foals sired by Goldfinch, a half brother to Common and Throstle, who won the New Stakes in 1891. Her dam Illuminata also produced Ladas and several influential broodmares including Phosphine, Vauxhall and Gas. The word chelandrie was used to refer to a goldfinch by Thomas Chatterton in one of his Rowley poems.

== Racing career ==
=== 1896: two-year-old season ===
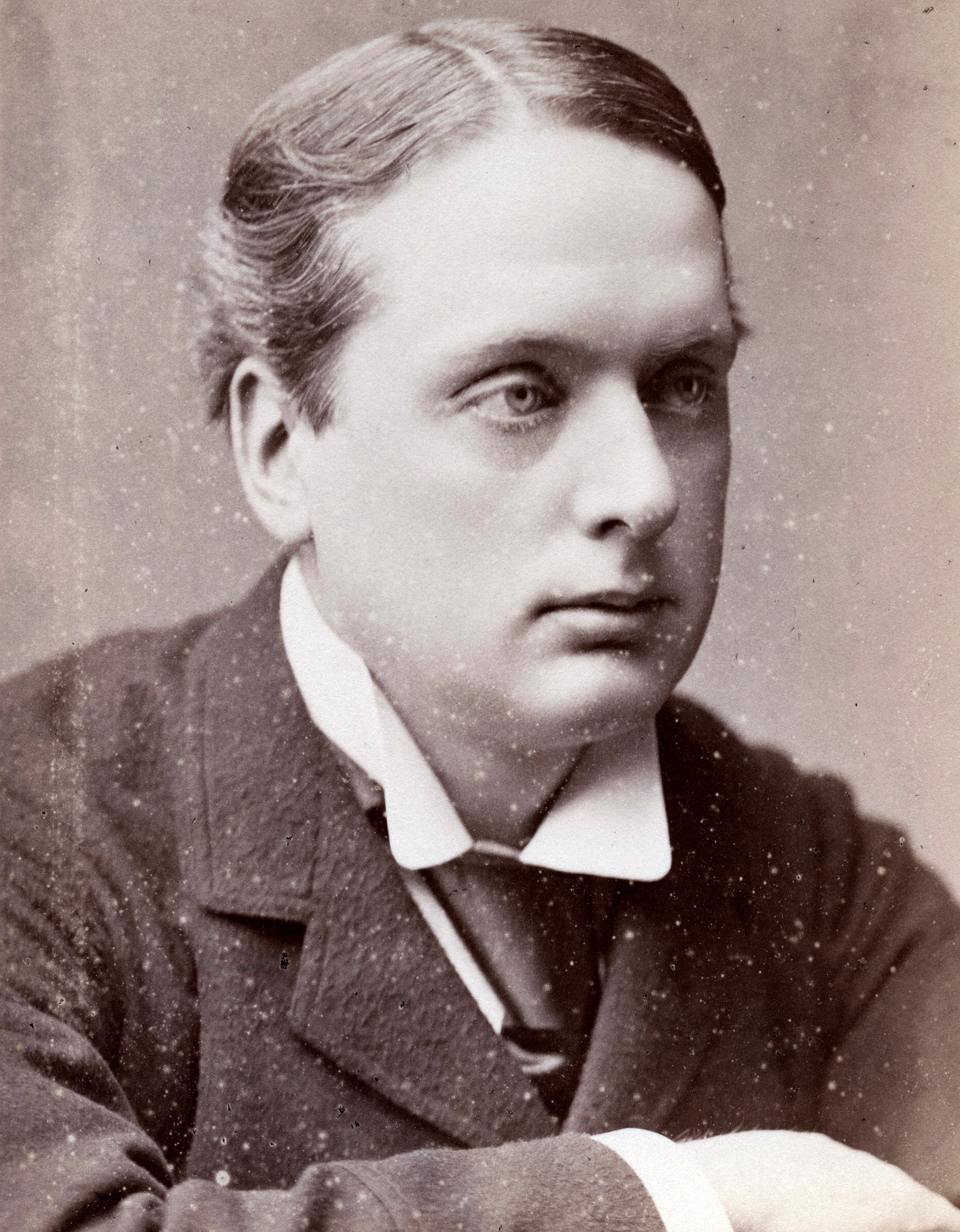
Chelandry's owner Lord Rosebery

In her first major race Chelandry contested the Royal Two-Year-Old Plate over five furlongs at Kempton Park Racecourse on 8 May and finished second, beaten three quarters of a length by Alfred W. Cox's colt Eager. In the Woodcote Stakes at Epsom Racecourse on 2 June the filly started the 1/3 favourite and won "easily" from Princess Anne. Two days later at the same course, the filly followed up by taking the Great Surrey Breeders' Foal Plate. In the Coventry Stakes at Royal Ascot two weeks later she disputed the lead for most of the way but faded in the closing stages and finished fourth behind Gorletta, Eager and Minstrel. In the National Breeders' Produce Stakes at Sandown Park in July Chelandry, who started the 9/4 joint-favourite, led from the start and won "with ridiculous ease" by two lengths from Ardeshir with the unnamed "Braw Lass colt" in third.

On 9 October Chelandry ended her season in the £3,000 Imperial Produce Stakes over six furlongs at Kempton Park. Starting the 4/7 favourite she drew away from her opponents in the final furlong and won "unchallenged" by three lengths from Cortegar, with Redress a head away in third.

At the end of the season, Chelandry was rated the best juvenile filly in England, albeit eight pounds inferior to the top colt Galtee More.

=== 1897: three-year-old season ===
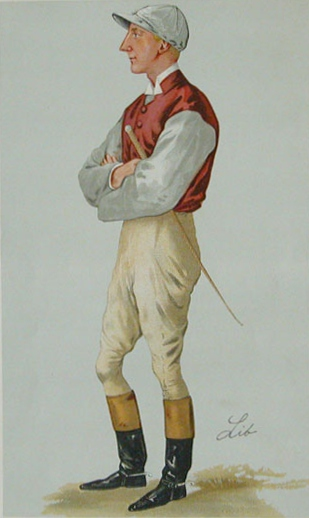
Chelandry's regular jockey Jack Watts

On 7 May 1897, Chelandry, ridden by John Watts, started the 9/4 second favourite behind Goletta in a nine-runner field for the 84th running of the 1000 Guineas over the Rowley Mile course at Newmarket Racecourse. After racing in second place she took the lead approaching the final furlong and "shot clear" to win "in a canter" by two lengths from the 20/1 outsider Galatia, with Goletta a length and a half back in third place. Lord Rosebery received particular congratulations as the race took place on his 50th birthday. The winning time of 1.42.6 was a new record for the race.

Chelandry was moved up in distance to contest the Oaks Stakes at Epsom on 5 June and although her old rivals Goletta, Galatia and Cortegar were in opposition she was regarded as a near certainty and went off at odds of 2/5. In a major upset she was defeated by Lord Hindlip's Limasol. Chelandry had tracked Limasol throughout the race but after drawing alongside her rival in the straight she was unable to sustain her challenge and was beaten three lengths into second place. At Royal Ascot eleven days later she failed to show her best form and finished unplaced behind Goletta in the Coronation Stakes.

The 1897 edition of the St Leger was seen as little more than a formality for the colt Galtee More who started at odds of 1/10 after emphatic victories in the 2000 Guineas and the Epsom Derby. Chelandry was one of four horses to oppose him and went off at 25/1. In a race which was run very slowly until the final stages she produced a strong late rush on the outside and finished second, three quarters of a length behind Galtee More, and a neck in front of the American-bred colt St Cloud. On her final start of the year Chelandry finished third behind Love Wisely and Velasquez in the £10,000 Jockey Club Stakes over ten furlongs at Newmarket on 30 September.

=== 1898: four-year-old season ===
For her first appearance as a four-year-old, Chelandry was assigned a weight of 112 pounds for the City and Suburban Handicap over ten furlongs at Epsom on 20 April and finished unplaced behind Bay Ronald. In July at Newmarket she ran unplaced behind Goletta in the £10,000 Princess of Wales's Stakes. On 29 September she ran third behind Cyllene and Velasquez in her second attempt to win the Jockey Club Stakes. Chelandry ended her racing career on 26 October when she finished ninth behind Dinna Forget in the Cambridgeshire Handicap.

== Breeding record ==
After her retirement from racing Chelandry became a broodmare for Lord Rosebery's stud and produced at least sixteen foals between 1900 and 1915. She produced several good winners including Neil Gow, Skyscraper, Traquair and Perdiccas and had a long-term influence on the Thoroughbred breed through her daughters who were the female-line ancestors of numerous top-class winners. She is the foundation mare of Thoroughbred Family 1-n. Her offspring included:

- Skyscraper, a chestnut filly, foaled in 1900, sired by Velasquez or Ayrshire. Won Cheveley Park Stakes. Female-line ancestor of Melodist, Never Say Die, Galatea, Americain, Transworld, Duncan and High Chaparral.
- Chelys, bay filly, 1901, by Sir Visto. Female-line ancestor of Flight.
- Samphire, bay filly, 1902, by Isinglass. Female-line ancestor of Ocean Swell, Tomy Lee and Genuine Risk.
- Pomander, bay colt, 1903, by Persimmon
- Traquair, chestnut colt, 1904, by Ayrshire. Won Coventry Stakes, July Stakes
- Popinjay, brown filly, 1905, by St Frusquin. Female-line ancestor of Saucy Sue, Pogrom, Book Law, Pay Up and Provoke.
- Perdiccas, chestnut colt, 1906, by Persimmon. Won Molecomb Stakes.
- Neil Gow, chestnut colt, 1907, by Marco. Won 2000 Guineas and Eclipse Stakes.
- Martial Note, bay filly, 1908, by Carbine
- Yippingale, bay filly, 1909, by William The Third. Female-line ancestor of The Trump.
- Chastelard, chestnut colt, 1910, by Bachelor's Button
- Soulouque, black colt, 1911, by Marco
- Dark Flight, brown filly, 1912, by Dark Ronald
- Bobolink, bay filly, 1913, by Willonyx. Female-line ancestor of Anabaa.
- Pennula, bay filly, 1914, by Sunstar. Female-line ancestor of Ravinella and Zino.
- Chersonese, bay filly, 1915, by Cylgad. Dam of Heroic and Female-line ancestor of Just A Dash.

Chelandry died in 1917 at the age of 23.

== Pedigree ==
Pedigree of Chelandry (GB), bay mare, 1894
Sire Goldfinch (GB) 1889	Ormonde; 1883	Bend Or	Doncaster
Sire Goldfinch (GB) 1889	Ormonde; 1883	Bend Or	Rouge Rose
Sire Goldfinch (GB) 1889	Ormonde; 1883	Lily Agnes	Macaroni
Sire Goldfinch (GB) 1889	Ormonde; 1883	Lily Agnes	Polly Agnes
Sire Goldfinch (GB) 1889	Thistle; 1875	Scottish Chief	Lord of the Isles
Sire Goldfinch (GB) 1889	Thistle; 1875	Scottish Chief	Miss Ann
Sire Goldfinch (GB) 1889	Thistle; 1875	The Flower Safety	Wild Dayrell
Sire Goldfinch (GB) 1889	Thistle; 1875	The Flower Safety	Nettle
Dam Iluminata (GB) 1877	Rosicrucian; 1865	Beadsman	Weatherbit
Dam Iluminata (GB) 1877	Rosicrucian; 1865	Beadsman	Mendicant
Dam Iluminata (GB) 1877	Rosicrucian; 1865	Madame Eglentine	Cowl
Dam Iluminata (GB) 1877	Rosicrucian; 1865	Madame Eglentine	Diversion
Dam Iluminata (GB) 1877	Paraffin; 1870	Blair Athol	Stockwell
Dam Iluminata (GB) 1877	Paraffin; 1870	Blair Athol	Blink Bonny
Dam Iluminata (GB) 1877	Paraffin; 1870	Paradigm	Paragone
Dam Iluminata (GB) 1877	Paraffin; 1870	Paradigm	Ellen Horne (Family: 1-l)
