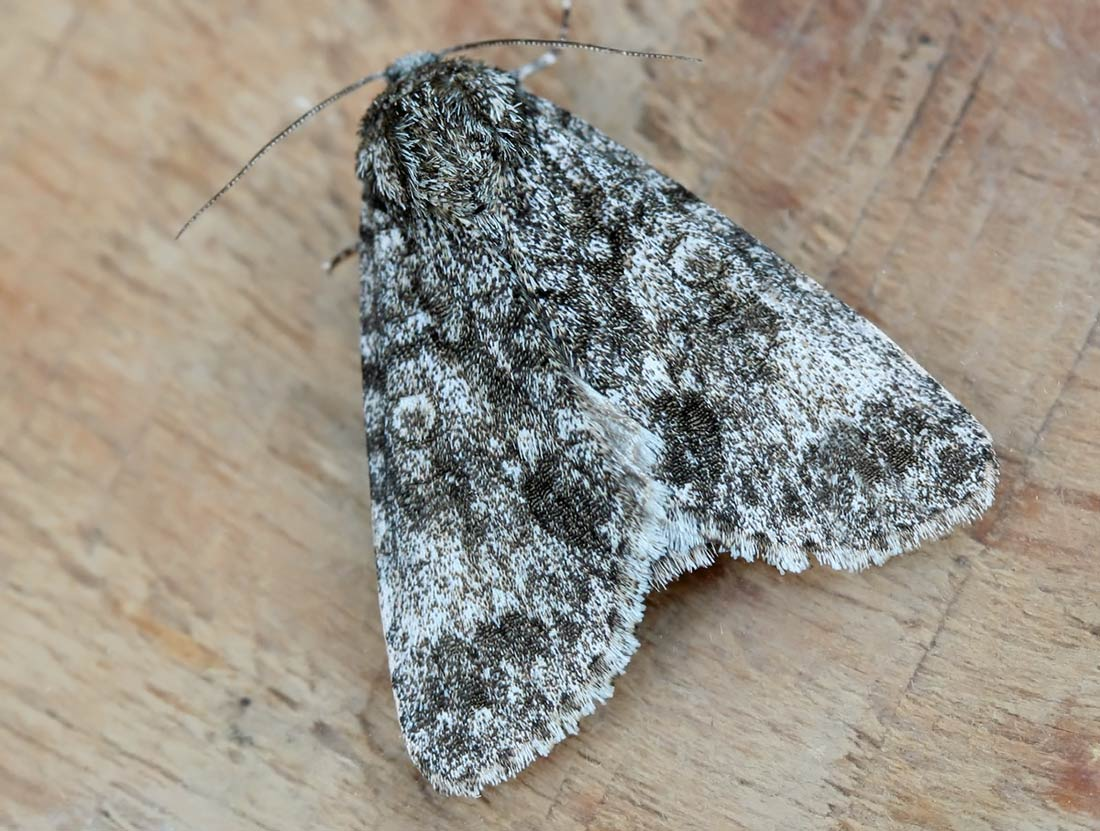

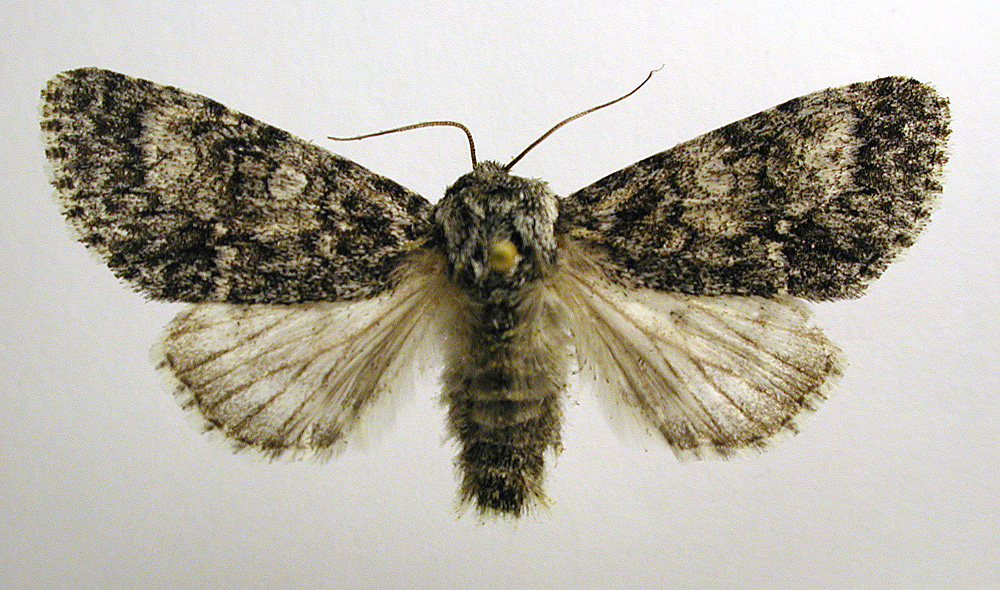

Scientific classification
- Kingdom: Animalia
- Phylum: Arthropoda
- Clade: Pancrustacea
- Class: Insecta
- Order: Lepidoptera
- Superfamily: Noctuoidea
- Family: Noctuidae
- Genus: Acronicta
- Species: A. megacephala

Binomial name
- Acronicta megacephala (Denis & Schiffermüller, 1775)

= Poplar grey =

Species of moth

The poplar grey (Acronicta megacephala) is a moth of the family Noctuidae. It is found throughout Europe.

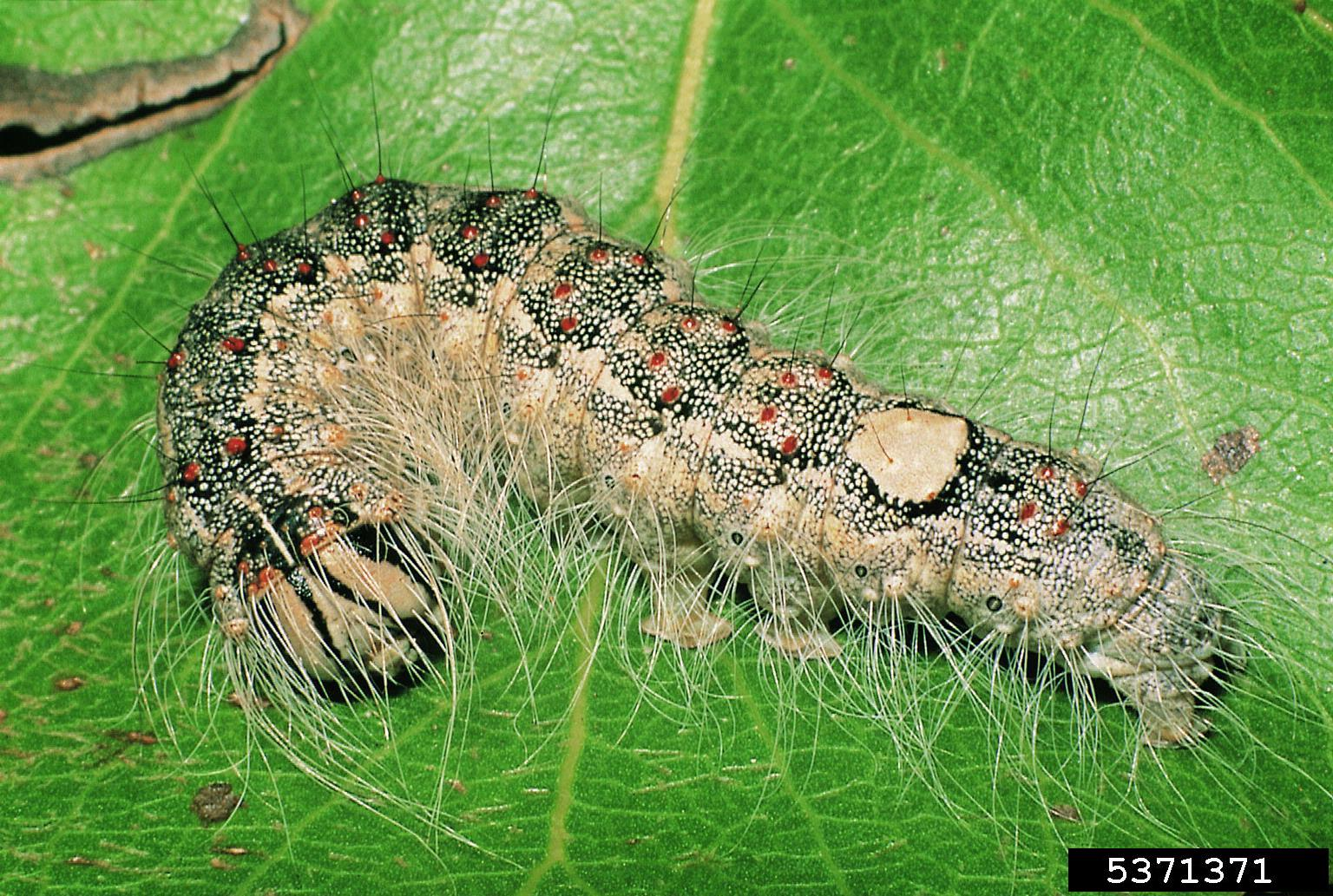
Caterpillar

== Technical description and variation ==
A. megacephala F. (3b). Forewing pale grey, suffused with dark, except in a patch beyond cell hindwing white in male, greyer in female. Larva dark grey, with granulated yellowish dots; segment 11 with a large yellowish-white dorsal patch; the hairs, which rise singly, whitish : head black with pale — In grumi Alph. the forewing is narrower, the space between inner line and median shade conspicuously whitish; this form is found in West China. — ab. ochrea Tutt has the ground colour distinctly ochreous; while in ab. rosea Tutt the forewing is rosy-tinged.

Melanic forms sometimes occur. The wingspan is 40–45 mm.

== Biology ==
This moth flies at night from May to August and is attracted to light and sugar.

The hairy larva is grey with black and red markings and a white patch towards the rear. It feeds on poplars and willows and sometimes on grey alder. The species overwinters as a pupa.

1. The flight season refers to the British Isles. This may vary in other parts of the range.
