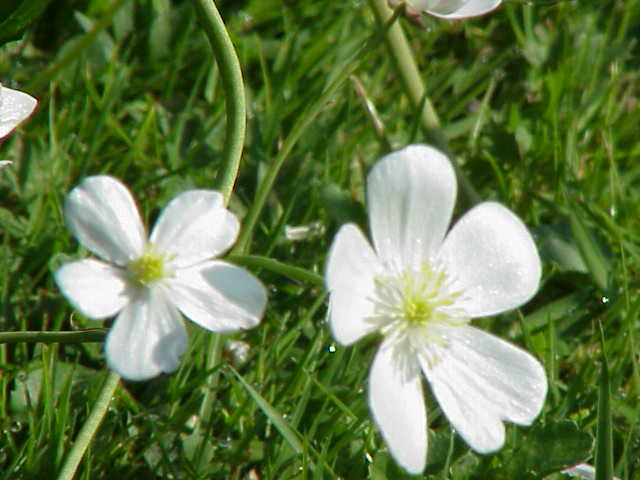

Scientific classification
- Kingdom: Plantae
- Clade: Tracheophytes
- Clade: Angiosperms
- Clade: Eudicots
- Order: Ranunculales
- Family: Ranunculaceae
- Genus: Ranunculus
- Species: R. aconitifolius

Binomial name
- Ranunculus aconitifolius L.

= Ranunculus aconitifolius =

Species of flowering plant

Ranunculus aconitifolius, the aconite-leaf buttercup or bachelor's buttons, is a species of flowering plant in the buttercup family Ranunculaceae, native to central Europe. Growing to 60 cm (24 in) high by 40 cm (16 in) broad, this herbaceous perennial has slightly hairy palmate leaves up to 20 cm (8 in) long, and loose panicles of white, saucer-shaped flowers in spring.

This species forms clumps, sometimes large colonies in moist places in mountains, meadows, edges of ditches and streams.

The Latin specific epithet aconitifolius means “with leaves resembling aconite”, a reference to the related genus Aconitum, the monkshoods.

The double-flowered cultivar R. aconitifolius 'Flore Pleno' (fair maids of France, fair maids of Kent) has gained the Royal Horticultural Society's Award of Garden Merit.
