= Neil Gow =

British Thoroughbred racehorse

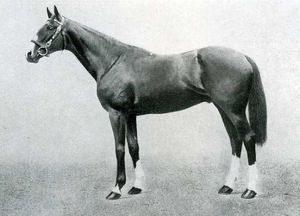
- Sire: Marco
- Grandsire: Barcaldine
- Dam: Chelandry
- Damsire: Goldfinch
- Sex: Stallion
- Foaled: 1907
- Country: United Kingdom
- Colour: Chestnut
- Breeder: Archibald Primrose, 5th Earl of Rosebery
- Owner: Lord Rosebery
- Trainer: Percy Peck
- Record: 10: 7-0-1
- Earnings: £21,941

Major wins
- National Breeders' Produce Stakes (1909); Imperial Produce Stakes (1909); Champagne Stakes (1909); Craven Stakes (1910); 2000 Guineas (1910); Eclipse Stakes (1910)

Awards
- Top-rated British two-year-old (1909)

Neil Gow (1907–1919) was a British Thoroughbred racehorse and sire who won the classic 2000 Guineas in 1910. In a racing career that lasted from spring 1909 until July 1910 the colt ran ten times and won seven races, attracting attention both for his racing ability and for his difficult and unpredictable temperament. He raced four times against the 1910 Epsom Derby winner Lemberg, winning twice outright and dead-heating on a third occasion. Neil Gow was one of the best British two-year-olds of 1909, when he won the National Stakes at Sandown Park, the Imperial Produce Stakes at Kempton Park and the Champagne Stakes at Doncaster. After winning the Craven Stakes on his first appearance of 1910 he overcame a strong field to win the 2000 Guineas at Newmarket. He finished fourth in the Derby and then dead-heated in the Eclipse Stakes. He was injured in training later that year and was retired from racing at the end of the season. He had limited success as a breeding stallion before his death in 1919.

== Background ==
Neil Gow was a chestnut horse with a white blaze and four white socks bred by his owner Lord Rosebery, the former British Prime Minister. His sire, Marco, a male-line descendant of the Godolphin Arabian, was a versatile breeding stallion whose progeny included winners of the Grand National (Sprig) and Kentucky Derby (Omar Khayyam). Neil Gow's dam Chelandry won the 1000 Guineas in 1897 and became an outstanding broodmare, whose descendants included Gallant Fox, Never Say Die and High Chaparral.

Rosebery named the colt after the Scottish fiddler Niel Gow but "corrected" the spelling. He sent his colt into training with Percy Peck at his stable in Exning, Suffolk.

== Racing career ==
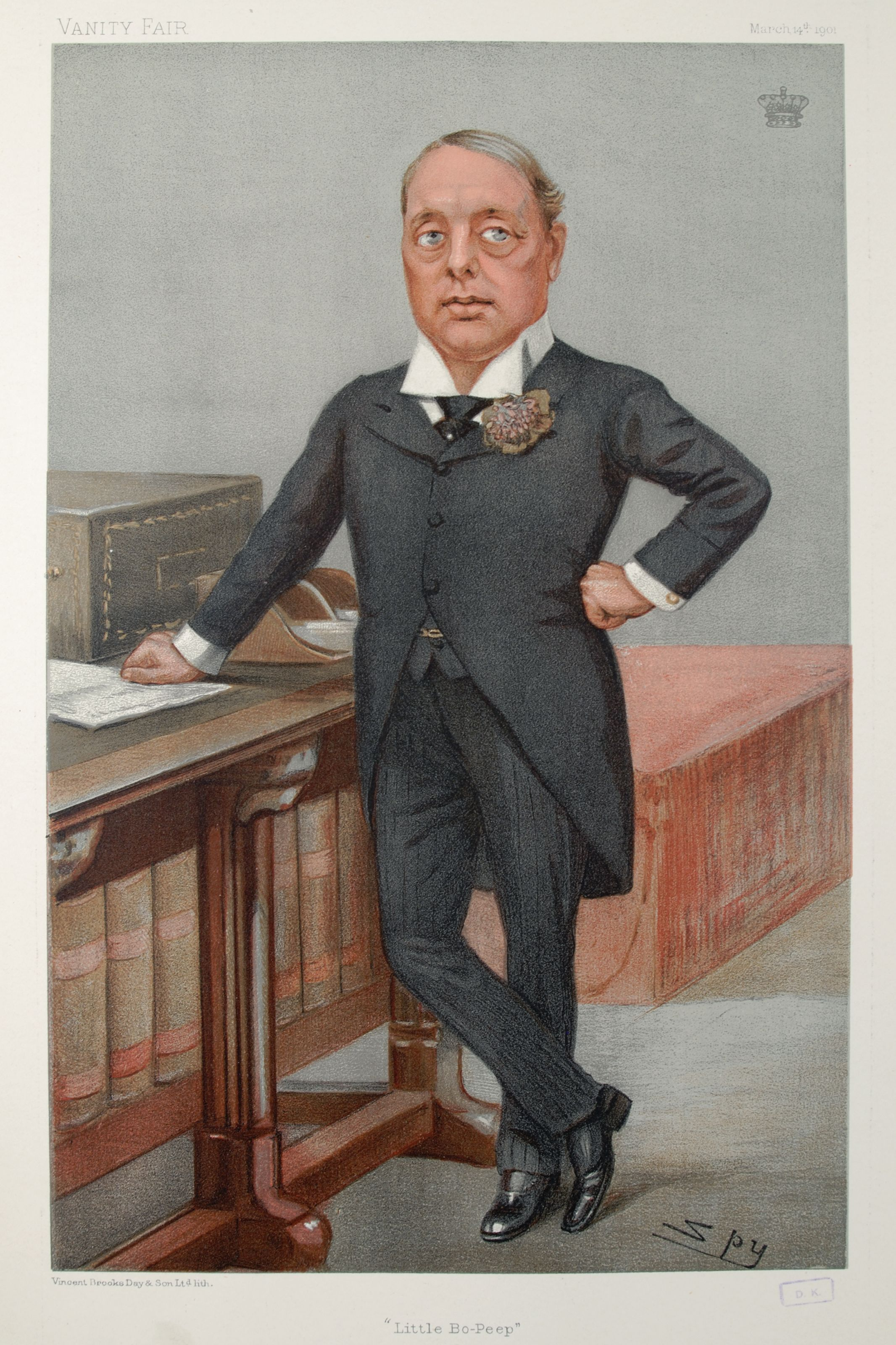
Lord Rosebery, who bred and owned Neil Gow

=== 1909: two-year-old season ===
Neil Gow made his debut in the Woodcote Stakes at Epsom Downs Racecourse in June. He failed to settle in the race and finished unplaced behind Varco. In the Coventry Stakes at Royal Ascot later that month he finished third to an Admiral Hawke (a brother of Pretty Polly). On his next appearance he ran in the £5,000 National Breeders' Produce Stakes over five furlongs at Sandown in July and won easily from sixteen opponents despite being left behind at the start. Later in July he won a Prince of Wales's Stakes at Goodwood Racecourse, establishing himself as one of the leading British colts of his generation.

Neil Gow was then sent to Doncaster for the six furlong Champagne Stakes in which he again met Admiral Hawke as well as the unbeaten Lemberg who was made odds-on favourite after his win in the New Stakes. Neil Gow won impressively, leading to his being described as "probably the best two-year-old in England". Lemberg went on to beat Whisk Broom II in both the Middle Park Stakes and the Dewhurst Stakes at Newmarket in October. On Neil Gow's final appearance of the season he was opposed by only two rivals in the £3,000 Imperial Produce Stakes at Kempton Park on 8 October. In a performance reminiscent of his run at Sandown, the colt was left ten lengths behind the other runners at the start, but recovered to catch Sunningdale in the closing stages and won by a head.

His win at Kempton took Neil Gow's earnings for the season to £10,306, making him the third most financially successful horse of the British season, behind the classic winning three-year-olds Bayardo and Minoru. In October, Neil Gow was given top weight in the Free Handicap, a rating of the year's best two-year-olds, three pounds above Lemberg who was in turn five pounds clear of Admiral Hawke and Whisk Broom. Concerns were however expressed about the colt's temperament, which had reportedly grown "worse with every public appearance".

=== 1910: three-year-old season ===
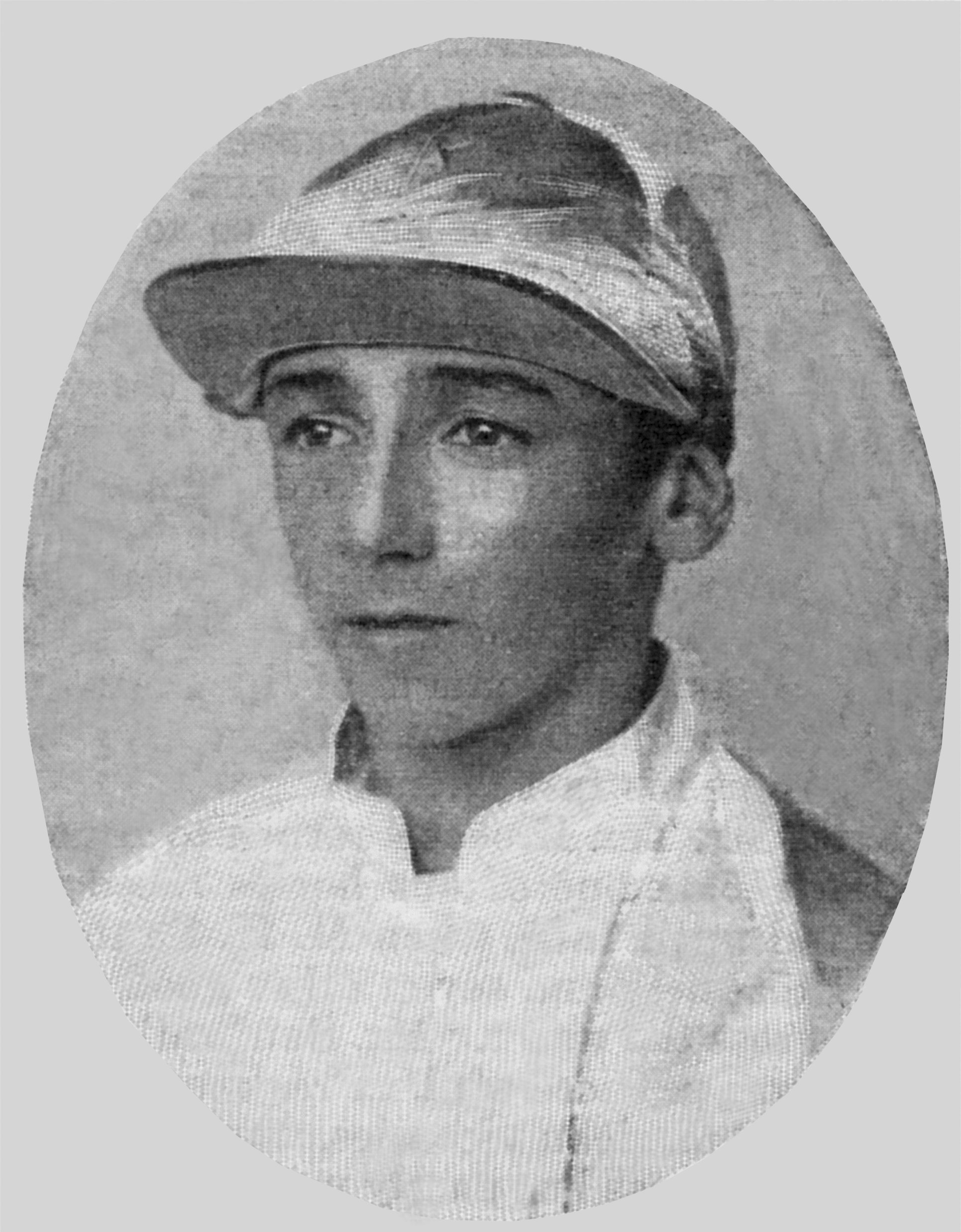
Danny Maher, who rode Neil Gow in 1910

Before the season began, there was much speculation concerning the riding plans of the American jockey Danny Maher. According to reports in the Telegraph he was offered £3,000 to partner Lemberg in the classics, but accepted a rival offer of £5,000 to ride Neil Gow, contingent on his winning the Derby. The booking of one of a leading jockey was seen as particularly important, given Neil Gow's reputation as a difficult horse to ride.

On his first appearance as a three-year-old, Neil Gow, carrying a ten-pound weight penalty, was matched against Whisk Broom in the Craven Stakes over Newmarket's Rowley Mile course on 14 April. He appeared beaten when losing his place two furlongs from the finish but produced an "extraordinary" run to overtake his rivals and won by three lengths despite being eased down by Maher in the closing stages. On a warm, sunny afternoon thirteen days later, Neil Gow started 2/1 favourite for the 2000 Guineas over the same course and distance, with Lemberg on 7/2. He was less troublesome before the race than he had been in the past, started reasonably well, and was able to track Lemberg throughout the race. The two favourites drew clear of the rest in the final furlong and Neil Gow, under a vigorous ride from Maher, prevailed by a short head in a “superlative” driving finish, with Whisk Broom two lengths back in third place.

Although he been beaten Lemberg on both their meetings, Neil Gow did not start favourite for the Derby. He was regarded as a doubtful stayer with an unreliable temperament although his defenders ascribed his occasionally difficult behaviour to "playfulness". His chances were compromised when he “sprang a curb” (became lame owing to a swollen hock) in one of his final training gallops, but he was allowed to take part as Rosebery did not want to let down members of the public who had already wagered on the horse. At Epsom on 1 June he started second favourite in front of a crowd estimated at 250,000, many dressed in black as a mark of respect to the recently deceased King Edward VII. Neil Gow became agitated and gave trouble at the start and failed to reproduce his best form finishing fourth of the fifteen runners behind Lemberg, Greenback and Charles O'Malley.

At Sandown on July Neil Gow faced Lemberg for the fourth and final time in a much anticipated contest for the Eclipse Stakes, then the most valuable race in England with a prize of £10,000. The relative merits of the two were much discussed and the race was expected to decide which of them would be regarded as the "horse of the year". Maher allowed the colt to settle towards the back of the six runner field while Bernard Dillon positioned Lemberg directly behind the pacemaker. Lemberg took a clear lead early in the straight but Neil Gow reduced his advantage and drew level twenty yards from the finish. The pair crossed the line together after a "sensational battle" and a dead-heat was declared. After what was described as the "race of the century", the owners agreed to divide the prize rather than subject their horses to a deciding heat. The contests between Neil Gow and Lemberg drew comparisons with the nineteenth-century rivalries, including those between The Flying Dutchman and Voltigeur (1850–1851) and between Bend Or and Robert the Devil (1880–1881). Neil Gow's share of the prize money took his earnings for the season to £11,635.

Neil Gow was prepared for a run in the St Leger but was withdrawn a week before the race after being injured in training. The injuries to his forelegs proved so serious that the colt was retired from racing and sent to stud.

== Assessment and honours ==
In their book, A Century of Champions, based on the Timeform rating system, John Randall and Tony Morris rated Neil Gow a "superior" winner of the 2000 Guineas.

== Stud record ==
Neil Gow stood as a stallion in England for eight seasons with mixed results. His most successful runner was Re-Echo who won the Cambridgeshire Handicap as a three-year-old in 1922, and was later exported to Argentina where he sired the undefeated champion Payaso. Neil Gow had some impact as a sire of broodmares, with his daughters producing the Oaks winners Rose of England and Chatelaine. He died on 21 April 1919.

== Sire line tree ==
- Neil Gow
  - Re-Echo
    - Payaso

== Pedigree ==
Pedigree of Neil Gow (GB), chestnut 1907
Sire Marco (GB) 1892	Barcaldine; 1878	Solon	West Australian
Sire Marco (GB) 1892	Barcaldine; 1878	Solon	Birdcatcher mare
Sire Marco (GB) 1892	Barcaldine; 1878	Ballyroe	Belladrum
Sire Marco (GB) 1892	Barcaldine; 1878	Ballyroe	Bon Accord
Sire Marco (GB) 1892	Novitiate; 1882	Hermit	Newminster
Sire Marco (GB) 1892	Novitiate; 1882	Hermit	Seclusion
Sire Marco (GB) 1892	Novitiate; 1882	Retty	Lambton
Sire Marco (GB) 1892	Novitiate; 1882	Retty	Fern
Dam Chelandry (GB) 1894	Goldfinch; 1889	Ormonde	Bend Or
Dam Chelandry (GB) 1894	Goldfinch; 1889	Ormonde	Lily Agnes
Dam Chelandry (GB) 1894	Goldfinch; 1889	Thistle	Scottish Chief
Dam Chelandry (GB) 1894	Goldfinch; 1889	Thistle	The Flower Safety
Dam Chelandry (GB) 1894	Illuminata; 1877	Rosicrucian	Beadsman
Dam Chelandry (GB) 1894	Illuminata; 1877	Rosicrucian	Madame Eglentine
Dam Chelandry (GB) 1894	Illuminata; 1877	Paraffin	Blair Athol
Dam Chelandry (GB) 1894	Illuminata; 1877	Paraffin	Paradigm (Family:1-n)
