= Black baronets =

Extinct baronetcy in the Baronetage of the United Kingdom

There have been two baronetcies created for persons with the surname Black, both in the Baronetage of the United Kingdom.

The Black Baronetcy of Louth Park in the County of Lincoln, was created in the Baronetage of the United Kingdom on 2 February 1918 for the steamship owner Alec Black. The title became extinct on his death in 1942.

The Black Baronetcy of Midgham in the parish of Thatcham in the County of Berkshire, was created in the Baronetage of the United Kingdom on 19 June 1922 for Robert James Black. He was a director of The Shell Transport and Trading Company and chairman of the Mercantile Bank of India. The title became extinct on the third baronet's death in 2021.

== Black baronets of Louth Park (1918) ==
- Sir Alec Black, 1st Baronet (1872–1942)

== Black baronets of Midgham (1922) ==
- Sir Robert James Black, 1st Baronet (1860–1925)
- Sir Robert Andrew Stransham Black, 2nd Baronet (1902–1979)
- Sir (Robert) David Black, 3rd Baronet (1929–2021)
