= Love in Idleness (horse) =

British-bred Thoroughbred racehorse

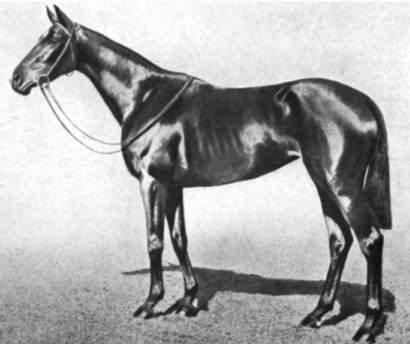
- Sire: Bachelor's Double
- Grandsire: Tredennis
- Dam: Cornfield
- Damsire: Isinglass
- Sex: Mare
- Foaled: 1918
- Country: United Kingdom
- Colour: Brown
- Breeder: Sir Gilbert Greenall
- Owner: Joseph Watson, 1st Baron Manton
- Trainer: Alec Taylor, Jr.
- Record: 12: 9-0-1
- Earnings: £12,561

Major wins
- Epsom Oaks (1921); Sandringham Stakes (1921); Yorkshire Oaks (1921); Park Hill Stakes (1921)

Love in Idleness (1918 – 1939) was a British Thoroughbred racehorse and broodmare. Her diminutive stature and courageous racing style made her one of the most popular horses of her time. She showed very promising form as a two-year-old in 1920 when she won four time from five starts. In the following year she was arguably the best three-year-old filly in England as she won the Epsom Oaks, Sandringham Stakes, Yorkshire Oaks and Park Hill Stakes. After retiring from racing he had some success as a dam of winners.

== Background ==
Love in Idleness was a lop-eared brown mare bred in England by Sir Gilbert Greenall. She was named after one of the common names of the wild pansy flower (viola tricolor). During her racing career she was owned by the Yorkshire industrialist Joseph Watson, 1st Baron Manton (1873–1922) who bought her as a yearling for 1,500 guineas. He sent the filly into training with Alec Taylor, Jr. at the famous stables at Manton, Wiltshire, recently purchased by Watson from Taylor (who was retained in charge of operations) and after which Watson named his peerage title in 1922. She was unusually small in stature, standing just over 15 hands and being described as "only a pony".

She was sired by Bachelor's Double, a top-class performer whose wins included the Railway Stakes, Irish Derby, City and Suburban Handicap and Royal Hunt Cup. She was a half-sister to Corn Cockle, who produced the July Cup winner Golden Corn. Love in Idleness's dam Cornfield was a great-granddaughter of the British broodmare Thistle (foaled 1875) whose other descendants included the British Classic Race winners Common, Throstle and Witch Elm. She was ridden in most of her races by Joe Childs, who rode some of Watson's other horses including Lemonora, winner of the 1921 Grand Prix de Paris at Longchamp, then the world's highest prize-money race.

== Racing career ==
=== 1920: two-year-old season ===
In 1920 Love in Idleness won four of her five starts, her only defeat coming when she finished second to Bayonne in the Redfern Plate at Kempton Park Racecourse. She won races at Ascot and Chester and in September she took the Champion Breeders' Foal Stakes at Derby Racecourse, coming from three lengths down to upset the favourite Polly Flinders. At Newmarket in October she won a Rous Memorial Stakes from moderate opposition. She ended the season with earning of £3,719 and was rated the third best juvenile filly of the year behind Pharmacie and Chilosa.

=== 1921: three-year-old season ===
Love in Idleness was scheduled to contest the 1000 Guineas over the Rowley Mile at Newmarket Racecourse on 29 April but was withdrawn from the race, which was won in her absence by Bettina, having been found to be "slightly amiss". In a twenty-two-runner field for the 143rd running of the Oaks Stakes over one and a half miles at Epsom Racecourse on 3 June, Love in Idleness started the 5/1 favourite ahead of Bettina, Pompadour and Hasty Match. Ridden by Childs in a race run in heavy rain she tracked the King's filly Picardy into the straight, took the lead two furlongs out and won "easily" by three lengths from Lady Sleipner with Long Suit a neck away in third.

At Royal Ascot Love in Idleness finished unplaced behind The Yellow Dwarf in the Ribbledale Stakes but then returned to the track before the end of June to contest the Sandringham Stakes over 10 furlongs at Sandown Park. Conceding 20 pounds in weight to the promising colt Perfect Knight she produced an exceptionally game performance to win by the narrowest of margins.

At York Racecourse in August the filly started at odds of 7/4 and won the Yorkshire Oaks, coming from last place to win by three lengths under a weight of 135 pounds. After the race she was praised for her "indomitable courage" and was reported to be "the popular idol of the English Turf". She was then stepped up in distance for the Park Hill Stakes over fourteen and a half furlong at Doncaster Racecourse in September and won "as she liked" from four opponents at odds of 1/5. In the Champion Stakes at Newmarket in October she was matched against male opposition and finished last of the four runners behind Orpheus.

Love in Idleness ended the season with earnings of £8,743, making her the second biggest winner of the year in Britain behind the colt Craig an Eran.

== Assessment and honours ==
In their book, A Century of Champions, based on the Timeform rating system, John Randall and Tony Morris rated Love in Idleness an "average" winner of the Oaks, and the best British-trained filly of her generation.

== Breeding record ==
At the end of her racing career Love in Idleness was retired to become a broodmare. When Lord Manton was killed in a hunting accident in 1922 she passed into the ownership of his son Miles Watson, 2nd Baron Manton. She produced at least six foals and three winners between 1923 and 1937:

- Gay Lothario, a chestnut colt, foaled in 1923, sired by Gay Crusader. Won two races.
- Idealist, bay filly, 1925, by Abbot's Trace
- Violator, chestnut colt, 1929, by Hurry On. Winner. Placed in Princess of Wales's Stakes.
- Lo Zingaro, chestnut colt, 1931, by Solario. Won five races. Third in the St Leger.
- Aphrodisia, bay filly, 1935, by Sandwich
- Hors d'Oeuvre, bay filly, 1937, by Sandwich

Love in Idleness died in 1939.

== Pedigree ==
Pedigree of Love in Idleness (GB), bay mare, 1919
Sire Bachelor's Double (IRE) 1906	Tredennis (GB); 1898	Kendal	Bend Or
Sire Bachelor's Double (IRE) 1906	Tredennis (GB); 1898	Kendal	Windermere
Sire Bachelor's Double (IRE) 1906	Tredennis (GB); 1898	St Marguerite	Hermit
Sire Bachelor's Double (IRE) 1906	Tredennis (GB); 1898	St Marguerite	Devotion
Sire Bachelor's Double (IRE) 1906	Lady Bawn (IRE); 1902	Le Noir (GB)	Isonomy
Sire Bachelor's Double (IRE) 1906	Lady Bawn (IRE); 1902	Le Noir (GB)	Knavery
Sire Bachelor's Double (IRE) 1906	Lady Bawn (IRE); 1902	Milady (GB)	Kisber
Sire Bachelor's Double (IRE) 1906	Lady Bawn (IRE); 1902	Milady (GB)	Alone
Dam Cornfield (GB) 1904	Isinglass (GB); 1890	Isonomy	Sterling
Dam Cornfield (GB) 1904	Isinglass (GB); 1890	Isonomy	Isola Bella
Dam Cornfield (GB) 1904	Isinglass (GB); 1890	Dead Lock	Wenlock
Dam Cornfield (GB) 1904	Isinglass (GB); 1890	Dead Lock	Malpractice
Dam Cornfield (GB) 1904	Landrail (GB); 1896	St Serf	St Simon
Dam Cornfield (GB) 1904	Landrail (GB); 1896	St Serf	Feronia
Dam Cornfield (GB) 1904	Landrail (GB); 1896	Thistlefield	Springfield
Dam Cornfield (GB) 1904	Landrail (GB); 1896	Thistlefield	Thistle (Family 4-c)

- Love in Idleness was inbred 3 × 4 to Isonomy, meaning that this stallion appears in both the third and fourth generations of her pedigree.
