= Dick Turpin (disambiguation) =

Dick Turpin (1705–1739) was an English highwayman.

Dick Turpin may also refer to:

== People ==
- John Henry Turpin (1876–1962), United States Navy sailor
- Dick Turpin (boxer) (1920–1990), English middleweight boxer

== Other uses ==
- Dick Turpin (TV series), a British television series
- Dick Turpin (1925 film), an American film
- Dick Turpin (1933 film), a British film with Victor McLaglen
- Dick Turpin (1974 film), a Spanish adventure film
- Dick Turpin (horse, foaled 1929), racehorse
- Dick Turpin (horse, foaled 2007), racehorse
- Dick Turpin, locomotive no. 2579 of the London & North Eastern Railway, see List of LNER Class A1/A3 locomotives
- The Completely Made-Up Adventures of Dick Turpin, a 2024 television series
