= Brown Betty (horse) =

British-bred Thoroughbred racehorse

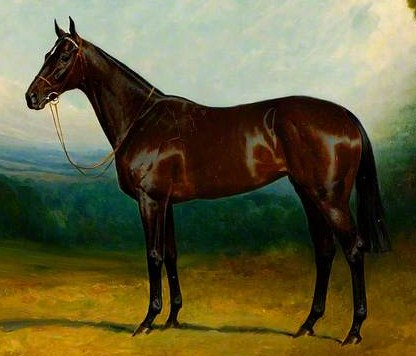
- Sire: Friar Marcus
- Grandsire: Cicero
- Dam: Garpal
- Damsire: Phalaris
- Sex: Mare
- Foaled: 1930
- Country: United Kingdom
- Colour: Bay or Brown
- Breeder: Alec Black
- Owner: William Woodward Sr.
- Trainer: Cecil Boyd-Rochfort
- Record: 11: 6-4-0

Major wins
- Cheveley Park Stakes (1932); 1000 Guineas (1933); Richemount Stakes (1933)

Brown Betty (known in the United States as Brown Betty II, 1930 – after 1937) was a British Thoroughbred racehorse and broodmare. She was one of the best of an exceptional crop of juvenile fillies in 1932 when she won her last four races including the Cheveley Park Stakes. In the following spring he recorded her biggest victory when she took the 1000 Guineas. She ran disappointingly when fourth in the Epsom Oaks but went on to win the Richemount Stakes and finished second in both the Nassau Stakes and the Park Hill Stakes. She was retired from racing at the end of her second season and exported to become a broodmare in the United States.

== Background ==
Brown Betty was a bay or brown mare with a white star bred in the United Kingdom by Sir Alec Black. As a yearling she was offered for sale and bought for 1,600 guineas by Cecil Boyd-Rochfort on behalf of the American banker William Woodward Sr. The filly was taken into training by Boyd-Rochfot at his Feemason Lodge stable in Newmarket, Suffolk. Woodward reportedly named Brown Betty after Boyd-Rochfort's niece, Betty McCall. Physically, Brown Betty was described as "a filly of exquisite quality, of great length without being long in the back, and of a hard, dark bay colour that adds materially to her beauty." The French trainer Frank Carter described her as the finest looking filly he had ever seen.

She was sired by George V's stallion Friar Marcus who won the Middle Park Stakes in 1914 and went on to become a successful sprinter. Brown Betty was his only classic winner although he was the damsire of Bahram. Her dam Garpal was a granddaughter of Santa Brigida (foaled 1898), a British broodmare who was the female-line ancestor of numerous major winners including Alcibiades, Mid-day Sun and Sun Stream. Garpal was bought by Alec Black for 3100 guineas from he breeder Lord Derby but sustained a fractured pelvis shortly afterwards and narrowly avoided being euthanised owing to the intervention of a veterinary surgeon.

== Racing career ==
=== 1932: two-year-old season ===
Brown Betty began her racing career by finishing second to Nun's Veil in the Chesterfield Stakes at Newmarket Racecourse in July. In the Molecomb Stakes on heavy ground at Goodwood, she was beaten three lengths by Lord Astor's filly Betty, but a week later she reversed the form by beating Betty a length in a race at Nottingham. On her next two starts the filly was successful in the Champion Beeders' Foal Plate at Derby Racecourse and a Rous Memorial at Newmarket. On her final start of the season Brown Betty was ridden by Joe Childs in the Cheveley Park Stakes over six furlongs at Newmarket and won from Solftara at odds of 2/1. The victory took her winnings for the year to £4198.

The 1932 Free Handicap, a ranking of the year's best two-year-olds, was unique in that fillies filled the top three places: Myrobella topped the list with 133 pounds ahead of Betty (130) with Brown Betty third on 129.

=== 1933: three-year-old season ===
On 29 April Brown Betty, with Childs again in the saddle, started at odds of 8/1 in a 22-runner field for the 120th running of the 1000 Guineas over the Rowley Mile at Newmarket. She won by half a length from Fur Tor with the favoured Myrobella three quarters of a length away in third.

Brown Betty was strongly fancied for the Oaks Stakes over 1 1/2 miles at Epsom Racecourse on 2 June but apparently failed to stay the distance and came home fourth behind Chatelaine, Solfatara and Fur Tor. Brown Betty finished second to Solfatara in the Nassau Stakes at Goodwood and then returned to winning form to take the Richemount Stakes over ten furlongs at Hurst Park. In the Park Hill Stakes over 14 1/2 furlongs at Doncaster Racecourse she was "nursed" though the race by Childs in an attempt to preserve her stamina but was outstayed in the closing stages and beaten a neck by Typhonic.

== Assessment and honours ==
In their book, A Century of Champions, based on the Timeform rating system, John Randall and Tony Morris rated Brown Betty an "average" winner of the 1000 Guineas.

== Breeding record ==
At the end of her racing career, Brown Betty was taken to the United States by Woodward to become a broodmare. She produced at least two foals:

- Gallant Friar, bay gelding, foaled in 1935, sired by Gallant Fox
- Gallant Betty, a bay filly, foaled in 1936, by Gallant Fox. Unraced.
- Dusky Fox, bay colt, 1937, by Gallant Fox. Winner.
- Brimstone, colt, 1938 by Sir Gallahad.

== Pedigree ==
Pedigree of Brown Betty (GB), bay or brown mare, 1930
Sire Friar Marcus (IRE) 1912	Cicero (GB); 1902	Cyllene	Bona Vista
Sire Friar Marcus (IRE) 1912	Cicero (GB); 1902	Cyllene	Arcadia
Sire Friar Marcus (IRE) 1912	Cicero (GB); 1902	Gas	Ayrshire
Sire Friar Marcus (IRE) 1912	Cicero (GB); 1902	Gas	Illuminata
Sire Friar Marcus (IRE) 1912	Prim Nun (GB); 1906	Persimmon	St Simon
Sire Friar Marcus (IRE) 1912	Prim Nun (GB); 1906	Persimmon	Perdita
Sire Friar Marcus (IRE) 1912	Prim Nun (GB); 1906	Nunsuch	Nunthorpe
Sire Friar Marcus (IRE) 1912	Prim Nun (GB); 1906	Nunsuch	La Morlaye
Dam Garpal (GB) 1920	Phalaris (GB); 1913	Polymelus	Cyllene
Dam Garpal (GB) 1920	Phalaris (GB); 1913	Polymelus	Maid Marian
Dam Garpal (GB) 1920	Phalaris (GB); 1913	Bromus	Sainfoin
Dam Garpal (GB) 1920	Phalaris (GB); 1913	Bromus	Cheery
Dam Garpal (GB) 1920	Brig of Ayr (GB); 1907	Ayrshire	Hampton
Dam Garpal (GB) 1920	Brig of Ayr (GB); 1907	Ayrshire	Atalanta
Dam Garpal (GB) 1920	Brig of Ayr (GB); 1907	Santa Brigida	St Simon
Dam Garpal (GB) 1920	Brig of Ayr (GB); 1907	Santa Brigida	Bridget (Family 8-g)

- Brown Betty was inbred 3 × 4 to Ayrshire and Cyllene, meaning that these stallions appear in both the third and fourth generations of her pedigree. She was also inbred 4 × 4 to St Simon.
