= Joe Childs =

French-born, British-based flat racing jockey (1884–1958)

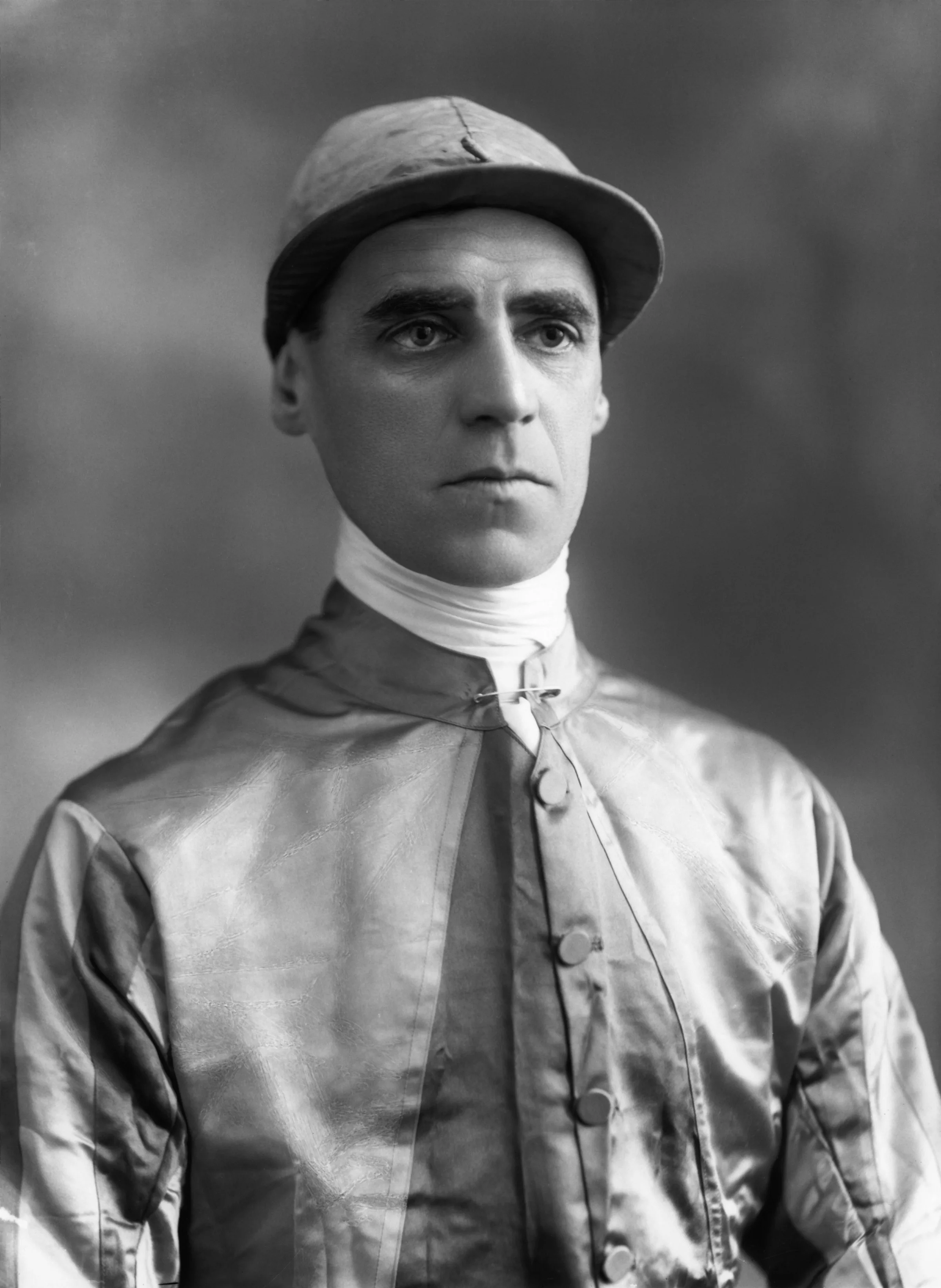
- Childs in 1919

Personal information
- Born: 6 May 1884 Chantilly, France
- Died: 5 February 1958 (aged 74) Portsmouth, England
- Occupation: Jockey

Horse racing career
- Sport: Horse racing

Major racing wins
- British Classic Races; 1000 Guineas Stakes (1928, 1933); 2000 Guineas Stakes (1918, 1931); Derby Stakes (1916, 1918, 1926); Oaks Stakes (1912, 1916, 1919, 1921); St Leger Stakes (1918, 1921, 1925, 1926); Other major races: Champion Stakes (1926); Coronation Cup (1920, 1926, 1927, 1929); Eclipse Stakes (1919, 1926, 1929, 1933); Gold Cup (1918, 1926, 1931, 1932); Goodwood Cup (1902, 1923); July Cup (1923, 1928); Nunthorpe Stakes (1926, 1927); St. James's Palace Stakes (1926, 1928); Sussex Stakes (1933)

Honours
- British Triple Crown (1918)

Significant horses
- Bayuda, Brown Betty, Cameronian, Coronach, Fifinella, Gainsborough, Golden Corn, Love in Idleness, Mirska, Polemarch, Reigh Count, Scuttle, Solario
- Updated on 21 January 2022

Joseph Childs (6 May 1884 – 5 February 1958) was a French-born, British-based flat racing jockey. He won fifteen British Classics in a 35-year career, the last ten years of which were spent as jockey to King George V. He was known for riding a slow, waiting race, and also for having a short temper which regularly saw him at odds with his trainers and owners.

== Early life ==
Childs was born in Chantilly into a racing family. His father had ridden successfully in France, and his grandfather had worked at the stables of Peter Price in Newmarket. There were also four brothers – Albert, Arthur, Charles and Henry – who all became jockeys. Joe would go on to be the foremost of these, but Charles Charlie Childs would win the 1916 St. Leger on Hurry On, two years before Joe himself won it. Albert became a trainer in Marseille, France.

Childs was married to Emily Lavis (1887–1914) like Childs she was from a racing family, born in Chantilly and the daughter of racing trainer Alfred James Lavis, they had one child Joseph (Joey) who died in 1917. He remarried to Amelia Hopkins, the daughter of jockey William Hopkins (1849?-1892) in 1917 by whom he had two further children Frederick and John.

== Career ==
=== Apprenticeship (1900–1902) ===
Childs spent his apprenticeship at Phantom House, Newmarket, the stables of trainer, Tom Jennings Jr. His first winner came for Jennings in 1900 at the now defunct Lincoln Racecourse on a horse called Lady Alicia. He was aged just 16. The following year he took a step up, winning the Royal Hunt Cup at Royal Ascot on Stealaway and the final November Handicap to be run at the New Barns course in Manchester before it was relocated. In 1902, he won the valuable Great Metropolitan Handicap at Epsom and the Goodwood Cup. Yet, despite these wins, he was beginning to struggle to get rides. He no longer qualified for the apprentice weight allowance, which made him a less attractive proposition as a jockey. In response to this problem, Jennings arranged for him to spend some time in Europe.

=== In Europe (1903–1913) ===
The first French trainer for whom Childs rode was Maurice Caillault. However, the quick temper which would come to mark his career cost him his job with Caillaut, as it would do with the owner Duc de Gramont and during a short lived spell at an Italian stable.

He was back and forth across the Channel for a couple of years before he finally found success on a third spell in France. Deputising for the sidelined George Bellhouse, he won the 1908 Grand Prix de Paris for owner William K. Vanderbilt on Northeast. The following year he won the 1909 renewal on board Verdun for Prince Murat and he began to surge ahead with his career. In 1908, he had ridden 75 winners; in 1909, 90.

His next battle was with his weight. This problem was solved with a move to Germany to ride for the von Weinbergs, with a contract that was not dependent on his meeting a specific weight. The Weinberg brothers' trainer was Fred Darling and Childs formed a partnership with that trainer which would provide him with some of his most memorable victories, although given Childs' temper the relationship was often stormy.

He was based back in France in 1912, when he won his first Classic on Mirska for his old trainer, Tom Jennings. His successful spell in Europe, though, was cut short by the advent of World War I. He escaped France on the last train before the Germans arrived and had to leave all his possessions behind.

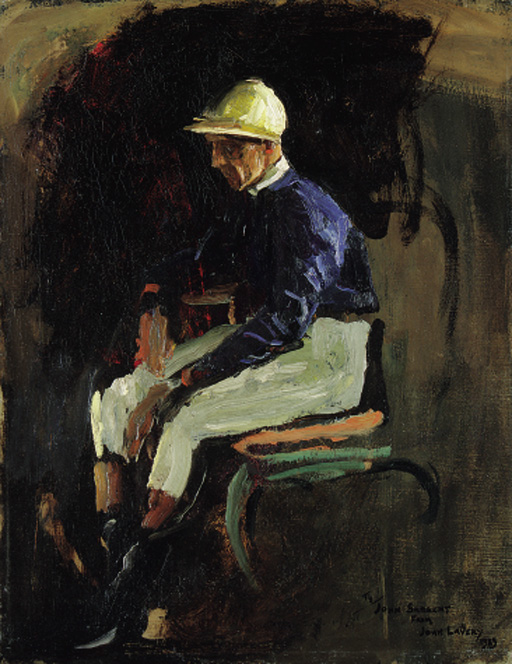
Portrait of Joe Childs (1923) by Sir John Lavery (1856–1941)

=== War years and beyond (1914–1924) ===
During the war, Childs initially joined the Royal Flying Corps but not taking to the disciplined regime he transferred to the 4th Hussars. Generously, they allowed him a good deal of leave so he could meet riding commitments.

This allowed him to partner the top class filly Fifinella in her classic year of 1916. It has been suggested he threw away a winning chance on her when she was 11/10 favourite for the 1,000 Guineas, hitting her as she played up in the stalls. As a result, she sulked during the race and failed to perform. Her finest moments, however, were yet to come. In the substitute Derby (Note: The wartime Oaks and Derbies were run at Newmarket) of that year, into which she had been entered because that year's crop of colts was so weak, she again acted obstreperously. This time however, she deigned to respond to Childs and in the final furlong he poked through a gap to win by a neck. She went on to be only the fourth, and to date, last, filly to do the Oaks-Derby double.

In 1918 even better was to come for Childs on the colt Gainsborough. Trained by Alec Taylor Jr. in Manton, Wiltshire, Gainsborough won the 2,000 Guineas, Derby and St. Leger with Childs as the jockey, becoming one of the few horses to have won the British Triple Crown. He would later repay the Hussars by donating his riding fees for 1918 to the regiment, including those for Gainsborough. Taylor would be one of the trainers for whom Childs would continue to ride after the war.

In 1919 he rode Bayuda to victory in the Oaks for Lady Douglas. He also rode Buchan, the odds-on favourite, for Lord Astor in the 1919 St. Leger, but got beaten. A dispute with Astor's racing manager over the matter meant he never rode for Astor again. In 1921, Childs became stable jockey to Cecil Boyd-Rochfort. The next few years were quieter by comparison with the big race victories of the war years, but in 1921 he won the Oaks on Love in Idleness and the Grand Prix de Paris on Lemonora, both for Joseph Watson (later Baron Manton), who had purchased the Manton estate. He also won a St Leger on Polemarch (1921) and a July Cup on Golden Corn (1923).

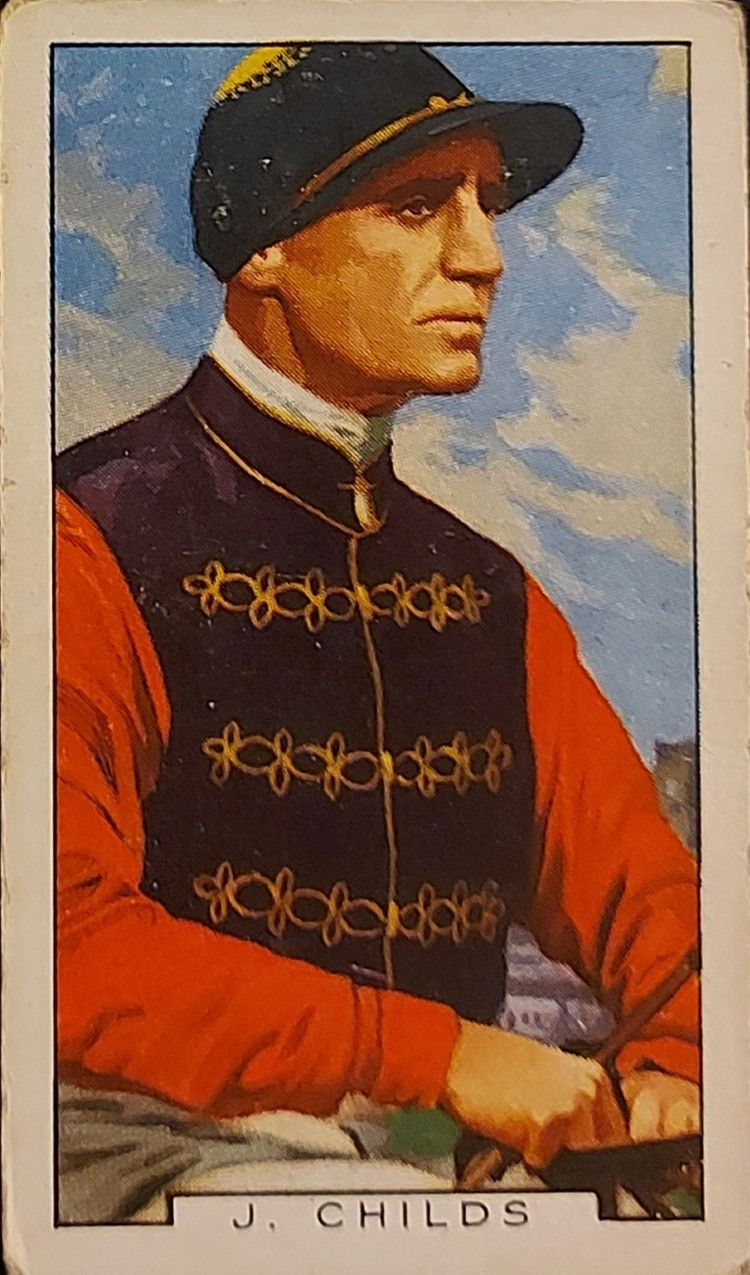
Childs, in the royal colours (Gallaher's cigarette card, 1936)

=== Royal Jockey (1925–1935) ===
From 1925 until his retirement in 1935, Childs would be jockey to King George V whose horses were trained by William Rose Jarvis. Childs would refer to the King as 'My Guv'nor' and would toast him with champagne every time he won on one of his horses. In the King's colours he would have 'the proudest moment of his life' when he won the 1929 1,000 Guineas on Scuttle. As a reward, the King presented Childs with a cane, which would become his most treasured possession. The 'best race he ever rode' was for the King too – the 1933 Hardwicke Stakes on Limelight.

Childs won the 1926 Derby on Coronach for one of his long standing trainers, Fred Darling, one of the few trainers who could handle him. The horse's aristocratic owner was Lord Woolavington. Childs and Coronach won the race with an uncharacteristically fast, front-running performance, Childs being known as a 'hold up' jockey. This resulted in a famous post-race comment, "The bastard ran away with me". No jockey would win a Derby with the same front running tactic until Steve Cauthen on Slip Anchor in 1985.

By the end of his career Childs was often found riding for Cecil Boyd-Rochfort and it was for him he rode his last classic winner – Brown Betty in the 1933 1,000 Guineas. Childs had by this time mellowed considerably with age. His final winner was at Derby in November 1935 and in December of that year he was invited to Buckingham Palace at the request of the King. In all, Childs had achieved 15 British Classic wins, two Grand Prix de Paris and one French Derby.

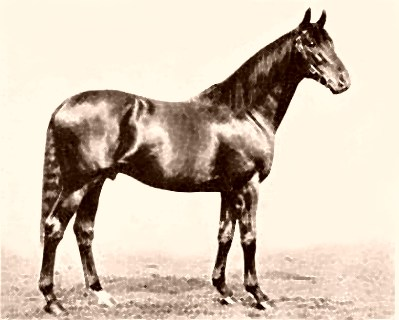
Gainsborough, the horse on which Childs won the Triple Crown

== Riding style ==
Childs was a tall jockey, described as "lithe and beetle-browed" These 'beetles' – his dark, bushy eyebrows – were said to give "broody, bellicose expression to a hair-trigger temper." In turn, the temper was one of the defining characteristics of his racecourse performances. He would regularly argue with officials, once reportedly accusing a steward of lying: "You were not at the gate and could not have seen the incident as you stated you did."

The other characteristic of his racing was the way he tended to win a race with "a well-timed rush". He is described as "The most fanatical exponent of waiting". or, put less favourably, "A waiting race was the only one he could ride" This "lack of versatility" is cited as the one thing that prevented Childs being a really great jockey.

Despite this, he was renowned in some quarters for his horsemanship and judgement in a race. He is said to have ridden some of his best races at Newmarket

== Retirement ==
On retirement he managed Portsmouth Greyhound Stadium and dabbled in horse ownership with trainer George Digby. He also kept a small stud at Nazeing in Essex. He published an autobiography, My Racing Reminiscences in 1952 and died in Portsmouth in 1958. In 1999, more than 40 years after his death, he was ranked 11th in the Racing Post list of Top 50 jockeys of the 20th century. John Crouch was appointed as king's jockey when Childs retired.

== Major wins ==
=== Classic races ===
(United Kingdom) Great Britain

- 1,000 Guineas – (2) – Scuttle (1928), Brown Betty (1933)
- 2,000 Guineas – (2) – Gainsborough (1918), Cameronian (1931)
- Epsom Oaks – (4) – Mirska (1912), Fifinella (1916), Bayuda (1919), Love in Idleness (1921)
- Epsom Derby – (3) – Fifinella (1916), Gainsborough (1918), Coronach (1926)
- St. Leger – (4) – Gainsborough (1918), Polemarch (1921), Solario (1925), Coronach (1926)

France

- Prix du Jockey Club – Sourbier (1920)

=== Selected other races (incomplete) ===
(United Kingdom) Great Britain

- Ascot Gold Cup – Gainsborough (1918), Solario (1926), Trimdon (1931, 1932)
- Champagne Stakes – Golden Corn (1921)
- Cheveley Park Stakes – Brown Betty (1932)
- Coronation Cup – Solario (1926)
- Eclipse Stakes – Buchan (1919), Coronach (1926)
- July Cup – Golden Corn (1923)
- Ribblesdale Stakes – Sir Cosmo (1929)

France

- Grand Prix de Paris – Northeast (1908), Verdun (1909)
