= John Crouch (jockey) =

British racing jockey (1915–1939)

John Lionel Crouch (1915 – 20 June 1939) was a British racing jockey who was also known as Jack Crouch.

His parents were Walter Thomas Crouch (1877–1959) and Blanche (nee Phillips, 1880–1922), and he was born in 1915 when the family resided in Deptford, part of the Greenwich area of London. In April 1939, Crouch was engaged to Barbara Hives.

He served his apprenticeship at the yard of Stanley Wooton in Epsom. By 1933, he was successfully competing and accumulated 31 wins by 1936. During October that year it was reported he was to be retained as the king's jockey after Joe Childs retired.

In the 1937 Epsom Derby he piloted the horse, Sandsprite, bred by Florence Nagle at odds of 100–1, to second place behind Mid-day Sun, owned by Mrs Lettice Miller, the first woman owner ever to win the Derby.

Crouch died when the de Havilland Dragon Rapide light aircraft he was a passenger in crashed on 20 June 1939. The aircraft had been travelling from Heston to Gosforth Park where Crouch was due to ride the king's horse Mouzelle in the Seaton Delaval Stakes; the horse was withdrawn as a mark of respect.
