= Sam Wragg =

English flat racing jockey

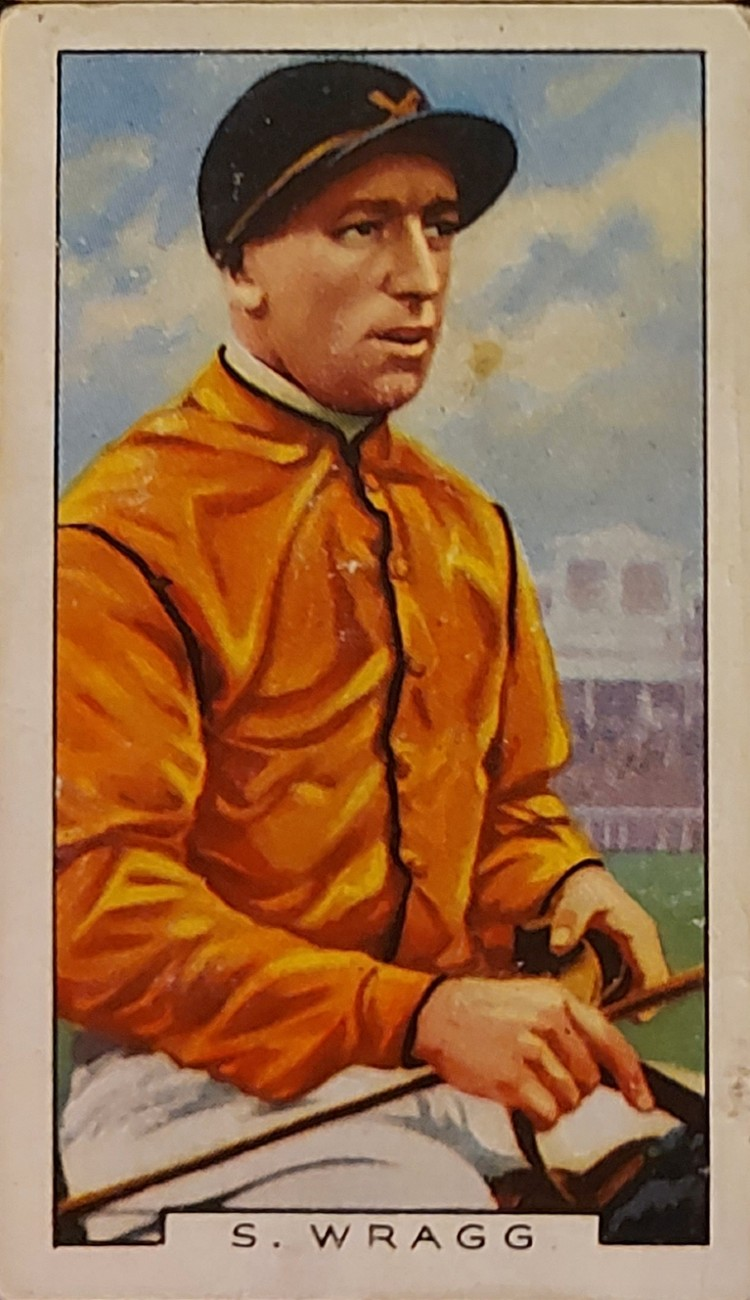
- Sam Wragg, in the colours of Ben Warner (Gallaher's cigarette card, 1936)

Personal information
- Born: 1909
- Died: 21 November 1983 (aged 73–74) Newbury, Berkshire
- Occupation: Jockey

Horse racing career
- Sport: Horse racing

Major racing wins
- Classic races: 1000 Guineas Stakes (1938); 2000 Guineas Stakes (1943); Oaks Stakes (1933); Derby Stakes (1940); Other major races: July Cup (1947); Nunthorpe Stakes (1937)

Significant horses
- Chatelaine, Kingsway, Pont l'Eveque, Rockfel
- Updated on 22 January 2022

Sam Wragg (1909 - 1983) was an English flat racing jockey, who won all of the British Classic Races except the St Leger Stakes in a successful career that straddled World War II.

== Early life ==
Wragg was the younger brother of Harry and older brother of Arthur, both also professional jockeys, with Harry being the most successful.

== Career ==
Like his older brother, he served his apprenticeship with Robert Colling in Newmarket. An early victory was at Warwick in a race Arthur would win the following year, but he had his first major victory on Herbert Braime's Hot Bun in the Liverpool Autumn Cup of 1930. The following year, he won the Stewards' Cup on Poor Lad and in 1933, he won his first Classic, the Oaks on Chatelaine.

He became the retained jockey of Lady Ludlow who used the trainer Captain Bell in Lambourn. He won the Stewards Cup again and the Ayr Gold Cup on her horse, Greenore in 1935. In 1937, he moved from Newmarket to Lambourn permanently. That year he won the Nunthorpe Stakes on Ipsden, owned by Lady Ludlow and the Cesarewitch on Punch. In 1938, he won a second classic - the 1,000 Guineas on Rockfel. He won his Derby during the war years, when it was run at Newmarket. His winner was Pont l'Eveque, trained and owned by Fred Darling.

After the war, he was still one of the top jockeys, riding 43 winners from 302 races in 1946. His best horse in this period was Star King, trained by John Waugh, on whom he won the Gimcrack Stakes and Richmond Stakes. He retired in 1953.

== Personal life ==
Wragg married Millicent Smith at Caxton Hall in 1935.

== Major wins ==
(United Kingdom) Great Britain

- 2000 Guineas Stakes – Kingsway (1943)
- 1000 Guineas Stakes – Rockfel (1938)
- Oaks Stakes – Chatelaine (1933)
- Derby Stakes – Pont l'Eveque (1940)
- July Cup – Falls of Clyde (1947)
- Nunthorpe Stakes – Ipsden (1937)

== See also ==
- List of jockeys

== Bibliography ==
- Mortimer, Roger; Onslow, Richard; Willett, Peter (1978). Biographical Encyclopaedia of British Racing. London: Macdonald and Jane's. ISBN 0-354-08536-0.
- Tanner, Michael; Cranham, Gerry (1992). Great Jockeys of the Flat. Enfield, Middlesex: Guinness Publishing. ISBN 0-85112-989-7.
