= George Bellhouse =

English jockey

Personal information
- Born: July 1885 Birmingham, England
- Died: 22 July 1946 Moulins, Allier, France
- Occupation: Jockey

Horse racing career
- Sport: Horse racing

Major racing wins
- British Classic Races: St Leger Stakes (1912); 1000 Guineas Stakes (1921); French Classic Races: French Derby (1919)

Significant horses
- Bettina, Tracery
- Updated on 22 October 2023

George Francis Bellhouse (July 1885 – 22 July 1946) was a Classic-winning jockey in both England and France.

He was born in the Upper Priory, Birmingham in July 1885 to an engineer of the city fire brigade. His riding career started as apprentice to William Flatman in Chantilly until Christmas 1905. In the season before he left he was second in the French jockeys' championship with 94 winners.

Back in England, he won the 1906 Lincoln Handicap on Ob. He was jockey to William Vanderbilt, but in 1908, he became ill and Joe Childs took over his role

He won two British Classics - the 1915 St Leger on Tracery and the 1921 1,000 Guineas on Bettina - as well as one in France - the 1919 French Derby on Tchad.

However, in 1920, he was partially paralysed in a fall and had to give up riding.

He died on 22 July 1946 at Moulins at the age of 61. He left an estate of £9,017.

== Major wins ==
(United Kingdom) Great Britain

- St Leger Stakes - Tracery (1912)
- 1000 Guineas Stakes - Bettina (1921)

== See also ==
- List of jockeys
