= Bettina (horse) =

British Thoroughbred racehorse

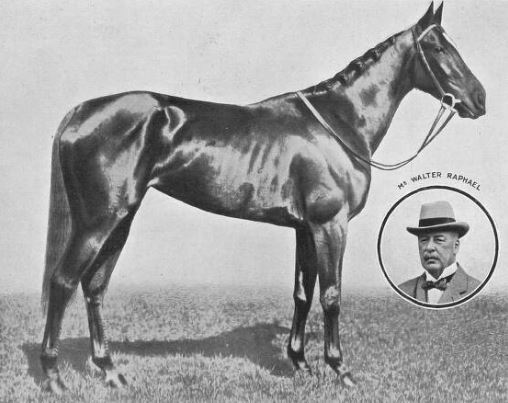
- Bettina in 1921 with her owner Walter Raphael (insert).
- Sire: Swynford
- Grandsire: John O'Gaunt
- Dam: Bobbina
- Damsire: Desmond
- Sex: Mare
- Foaled: 1918
- Country: United Kingdom
- Colour: Bay
- Breeder: Walter Raphael
- Owner: Walter Raphael
- Trainer: Percy Linton
- Record: 8: 2-0-1

Major wins
- 1000 Guineas (1921)

Bettina (1918 – 1929) was a British Thoroughbred racehorse and broodmare. She showed promise as a juvenile when she won the Prince of Wales Plate at York and finished third in the Cheveley Park Stakes. In the following spring she recorded her biggest victory when she won the 1000 Guineas at odds of 33/1. She was retired to breeding duty soon afterwards but made no impact as a broodmare.

== Background ==
Bettina was a bay mare bred and owned by the London financier Walter Raphael. She was trained throughout her racing career by Percy Linton.

Her sire Swynford was an outstanding racehorse who won the St Leger in 1910 and the Eclipse Stakes in the following year. He was even better as a breeding stallion with his other offspring including Blandford, Saucy Sue, Challenger, Tranquil and Sansovino. Her dam Bobbina was a great-granddaughter of Footlight, who is regarded as the foundation mare of Thoroughbred family 1-m.

== Racing career ==
=== 1920: two-year-old season ===
Bettina raced five times as a two-year-old in 1920. She finished unplaced behind the colt Alan Breck in the July Stakes before recording her only success of the season when she won the Prince of Wales Plate over five furlongs at York Racecourse on 24 August, beating the colt Scorpius by a length. On her final start of the year Bettina contested the Cheveley Park Stakes over six furlongs at Newmarket Racecourse and finished third behind Romana and Queen Wasp.

=== 1921: three-year-old season ===
Bettina has beaten on her three-year-old debut and then started a 33/1 outsider in a 24-runner field for the 108th running of the 1000 Guineas over the Rowley Mile on 29 April. Owing to a strike by coal miners, the race was run on the same day as the 2000 Guineas, leading to serious traffic problems in the Newmarket area. Ridden by George Bellhouse, she upset the odds as she won "easily" by one and a half lengths from Petrea with Pompadour three quarters of a length back in third place. Her victory earned her owner £8,200.

On 3 June, the filly was stepped up in distance for the Epsom Oaks over one and a half miles. She started the 6/1 second choice in the betting but came home unplaced behind Love in Idleness. Bettina ran unplaced in a race at Royal Ascot later that month and was retired from the track soon afterwards.

== Assessment and honours ==
In their book, A Century of Champions, based on the Timeform rating system, John Randall and Tony Morris rated Bettina an "inferior" winner of the 1000 Guineas.

== Breeding record ==
Bettina was retired from racing to become a broodmare. She made no impact as a broodmare as most of her offspring died young. Bettina died in 1929.

- Colt by Rock Flint (1923)- died young
- Giovanni (1924), chestnut colt by Pommern. He competed in steeplechase races before he was bought by the British Bloodstock Agency and sent to India in 1927.
- Brenda (1925), bay filly by Sky-rocket
- Alexis (1926), gray colt by Allenby or Poltava- died in 1928

== Pedigree ==
Pedigree of Bettina (GB), bay mare, 1918
Sire Swynford (GB) 1907	John O'Gaunt (GB); 1901	Isinglass	Isonomy
Sire Swynford (GB) 1907	John O'Gaunt (GB); 1901	Isinglass	Dead Lock
Sire Swynford (GB) 1907	John O'Gaunt (GB); 1901	La Fleche	St Simon
Sire Swynford (GB) 1907	John O'Gaunt (GB); 1901	La Fleche	Quiver
Sire Swynford (GB) 1907	Canterbury Pilgrim (GB); 1893	Tristan	Hermit
Sire Swynford (GB) 1907	Canterbury Pilgrim (GB); 1893	Tristan	Thrift
Sire Swynford (GB) 1907	Canterbury Pilgrim (GB); 1893	Pilgrimage	The Palmer
Sire Swynford (GB) 1907	Canterbury Pilgrim (GB); 1893	Pilgrimage	Lady Audley
Dam Bobbina (GB) 1911	Desmond (GB); 1896	St Simon	Galopin
Dam Bobbina (GB) 1911	Desmond (GB); 1896	St Simon	St Angela
Dam Bobbina (GB) 1911	Desmond (GB); 1896	L'Abbesse de Jouarre	Trappist
Dam Bobbina (GB) 1911	Desmond (GB); 1896	L'Abbesse de Jouarre	Festive
Dam Bobbina (GB) 1911	Bobbin (GB); 1905	Orme	Ormonde
Dam Bobbina (GB) 1911	Bobbin (GB); 1905	Orme	Angelica
Dam Bobbina (GB) 1911	Bobbin (GB); 1905	Silver Thread	Ayrshire
Dam Bobbina (GB) 1911	Bobbin (GB); 1905	Silver Thread	Footlight (Family 1-m)

- Bettina was inbred 3 × 4 to St Simon, meaning that he appears in both the third and fourth generations of her pedigree.
