= List of LNER Class A1/A3 locomotives =

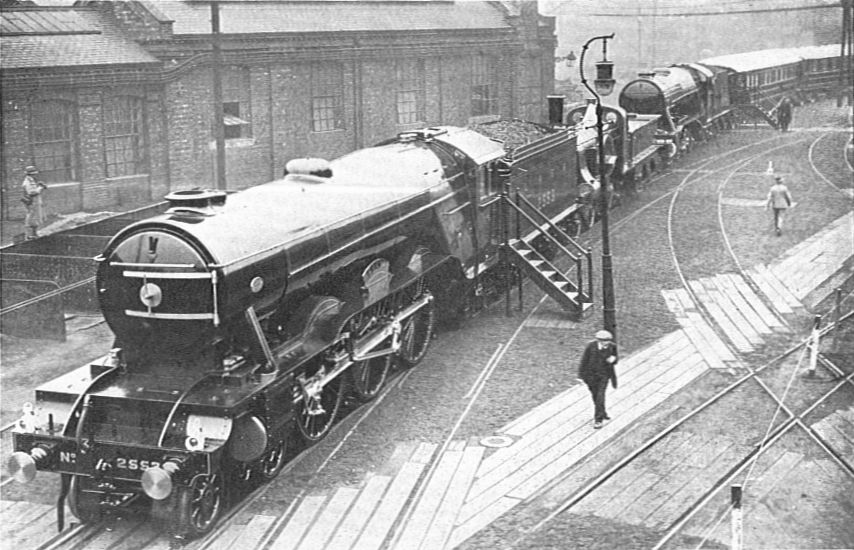
LNER A1 No. 2553 waiting to be named Prince of Wales by the Prince of Wales in 1926

Below are the names and numbers of the steam locomotives that comprised the LNER Gresley Classes A1 and A3, that ran on the Great Northern (GNR) and latterly the London and North Eastern Railway network. They represented Nigel Gresley's attempt to standardise steam design. The class names mainly denoted various racehorses; there were seven exceptions, detailed at the end.

Nos. 4470–81 were ordered by the GNR as their nos. 1470–81; and although only the first two were actually delivered to the GNR, all twelve initially bore their GNR numbers, a distinguishing suffix letter "N" being added to the last two from new, and to five others from August 1923, i.e. 1480N, etc. These twelve all had their numbers increased by 3000 between February 1924 and April 1925. The others bore their LNER numbers (2543 etc.) from new.

== Fleet list ==
List of locomotives
LNER No.	LNER No. (1945-1948)	BR No.	Original Name (Rename(s))	Manufacturer	Serial No.	Entered service	Rebuilt	Withdrawn	Fate
4470	113	60113	Great Northern	Doncaster Works	1536	April 1922	September 1945 (Note: as Thompson Class A1/1; all others rebuilt as Class A3)	–	Rebuilt as a Thompson A1/1, later scrapped.
4471	102	60102	Sir Frederick Banbury	Doncaster Works	1539	10 July 1922	October 1942	November 1961	Scrapped
4472	502 (103)	60103	Flying Scotsman	Doncaster Works	1564	24 February 1923	January 1947	January 1963	Preserved
4473	104	60104	Solario	Doncaster Works	1565	17 March 1923	October 1941	19 November 1959	Scrapped at Doncaster Works on 7 December 1959.
4474	105	60105	Victor Wild	Doncaster Works	1566	March 1923	October 1942	November 1963	Scrapped
4475	106	60106	Flying Fox	Doncaster Works	1567	April 1923	March 1947	November 1964	Scrapped
4476	107	60107	Royal Lancer	Doncaster Works	1568	May 1923	October 1946	November 1963	Scrapped
4477	507 (108)	60108	Gay Crusader	Doncaster Works	1569	June 1923	January 1943	November 1963	Scrapped
4478	508 (109)	60109	Hermit	Doncaster Works	1570	July 1923	November 1943	November 1962	Scrapped
4479	110	60110	Robert the Devil	Doncaster Works	1571	July 1923	August 1942	November 1963	Scrapped
4480	111	60111	Enterprise	Doncaster Works	1572	August 1923	July 1927	November 1962	Scrapped
4481	511 (112)	60112	St Simon	Doncaster Works	1573	September 1923	August 1946	November 1964	Scrapped
2543	44	60044	Melton	Doncaster Works	1598	28 June 1924	September 1947	16 June 1963	Scrapped at Doncaster Works on 25 November 1963.
2544	45	60045	Lemberg	Doncaster Works	1600	July 1924	December 1927	November 1964	Scrapped at Albert Draper & Son Limited in January 1965.
2545	46	60046	Diamond Jubilee	Doncaster Works	1601	9 August 1924	10 January 1948	28 August 1963	Scrapped at Doncaster Works on 20 August 1963.
2546	47	60047	Donovan	Doncaster Works	1602	30 August 1924	January 1948	8 April 1963	Scrapped at Doncaster Works on 19 June 1963.
2547	48	60048	Doncaster	Doncaster Works	1603	30 August 1924	10 May 1946	8 September 1963	Scrapped at Doncaster Works on 19 September 1963.
2548	517 (49)	60049	Galtee More	Doncaster Works	1604	27 September 1924	10 May 1945	29 December 1962	Scrapped at Doncaster Works on 4 April 1963.
2549	518 (50)	60050	Persimmon	Doncaster Works	1605	15 October 1924	December 1943	11 June 1963	Scrapped at Doncaster Works on 9 August 1963.
2550	51	60051	Blink Bonny	Doncaster Works	1606	October 1924	November 1945	November 1964	Scrapped
2551	520 (52)	60052	Prince Palatine	Doncaster Works	1607	November 1924	August 1941	January 1966	Scrapped at St Margaret's Shed, Edinburgh in April 1966.
2552	521 (53)	60053	Sansovino	Doncaster Works	1608	11 December 1924	10 September 1943	27 May 1963	Scrapped at Doncaster Works on 31 May 1963.
2553	522 (54)	60054	Manna (renamed 11 November 1926); Prince of Wales	Doncaster Works	1609	December 1924	July 1943	June 1964	Scrapped
2554	55	60055	Woolwinder	Doncaster Works	1610	31 December 1924	June 1942	4 September 1961	Scrapped at Doncaster Works on 30 September 1961.
2555	56	60056	Centenary	Doncaster Works	1611	7 February 1925	August 1944	13 May 1963	Scrapped at Doncaster Works on 31 May 1963.
2556	57	60057	Ormonde	Doncaster Works	1612	7 February 1925	13 January 1947	13 May 1963	Scrapped
2557	58	60058	Blair Athol	Doncaster Works	1613	28 February 1925	December 1945	19 June 1963	Scrapped at Doncaster Works on 10 July 1963.
2558	59	60059	Tracery	Doncaster Works	1614	25 March 1925	19 July 1942	17 December 1962	Scrapped at Doncaster Works on 31 December 1962.
2559	528 (60)	60060	The Tetrarch	Doncaster Works	1615	April 1925	January 1942	September 1963	Scrapped
2560	61	60061	Pretty Polly	Doncaster Works	1616	17 April 1925	May 1944	8 September 1963	Scrapped at Doncaster Works on 16 September 1963.
2561	62	60062	Minoru	Doncaster Works	1617	May 1925	June 1944	May 1964	Scrapped
2562	531 (63)	60063	Isinglass	Doncaster Works	1618	July 1925	April 1946	June 1964	Scrapped
2563	64	60064	William Whitelaw (name transferred to A4 No. 4462 in July 1941; Tagalie)	North British Loco.	23101	9 August 1924	10 November 1942	4 September 1961	Scrapped at Doncaster Works on 30 September 1961.
2564	65	60065	Knight of the Thistle (renamed Knight of Thistle in December 1932)	North British Loco.	23102	August 1924	March 1947	June 1964	Scrapped
2565	66	60066	Merry Hampton	North British Loco.	23103	16 July 1924	December 1945	8 September 1963	Scrapped at Doncaster Works on 18 September 1963.
2566	67	60067	Ladas	North British Loco.	23104	14 August 1924	10 November 1939	29 December 1962	Scrapped at Doncaster Works on 21 January 1963.
2567	68	60068	Sir Visto	North British Loco.	23105	14 September 1924	10 December 1948	27 August 1962	Scrapped at Doncaster Works on 31 August 1962.
2568	537 (69)	60069	Sceptre	North British Loco.	23106	19 September 1924	10 May 1942	1 October 1962	Scrapped at Doncaster Works on 27 May 1963.
2569	538 (70)	60070	Gladiateur	North British Loco.	23107	September 1924	January 1947	May 1964	Scrapped
2570	71	60071	Tranquil	North British Loco.	23108	September 1924	October 1944	October 1964	Scrapped
2571	72	60072	Sunstar	North British Loco.	23109	30 September 1924	22 July 1941	22 October 1962	Scrapped at Doncaster Works on 25 May 1963.
2572	73	60073	St. Gatien	North British Loco.	23110	October 1924	November 1945	August 1963	Scrapped
2573	542 (74)	60074	Harvester	North British Loco.	23111	8 October 1924	April 1928	8 April 1963	Scrapped at Doncaster Works on 29 May 1963.
2574	75	60075	St. Frusquin	North British Loco.	23112	October 1924	June 1942	January 1964	Scrapped
2575	76	60076	Galopin	North British Loco.	23113	14 October 1924	June 1941	29 October 1962	Scrapped at Doncaster Works on 17 April 1963.
2576	545 (77)	60077	The White Knight	North British Loco.	23114	October 1924	July 1943	July 1964	Scrapped
2577	78	60078	Night Hawk	North British Loco.	23115	24 October 1924	January 1944	22 October 1962	Scrapped at Doncaster Works on 9 May 1963.
2578	79	60079	Bayardo	North British Loco.	23116	October 1924	May 1928	September 1961	Scrapped
2579	80	60080	Dick Turpin	North British Loco.	23117	November 1924	November 1942	October 1964	Scrapped
2580	81	60081	Shotover	North British Loco.	23118	November 1924	February 1928	October 1962	Scrapped
2581	82	60082	Neil Gow	North British Loco.	23119	November 1924	January 1943	September 1963	Scrapped
2582	83	60083	Sir Hugo	North British Loco.	23120	December 1924	December 1941	May 1964	Scrapped
2743	89	60089	Felstead	Doncaster Works	1693	August 1928	—	October 1963	Scrapped
2744	90	60090	Grand Parade	Doncaster Works	1694	August 1928	—	October 1963	Damaged beyond repair in the 1937 Castlecary accident, replacement built April 1938
2745	91	60091	Captain Cuttle	Doncaster Works	1695	September 1928	—	October 1964	Scrapped
2746	92	60092	Fairway	Doncaster Works	1700	November 1928	—	October 1964	Scrapped
2747	93	60093	Coronach	Doncaster Works	1703	December 1928	—	April 1962	Scrapped
2748	94	60094	Colorado	Doncaster Works	1705	December 1928	—	February 1964	Scrapped
2749	558 (95)	60095	Flamingo	Doncaster Works	1707	February 1929	—	April 1961	Scrapped
2750	96	60096	Papyrus	Doncaster Works	1708	March 1929	—	September 1963	Scrapped
2751	97	60097	Humorist	Doncaster Works	1709	April 1929	—	August 1963	Scrapped
2752	561 (98)	60098	Spion Kop	Doncaster Works	1710	April 1929	—	October 1963	Scrapped
2595	84	60084	Trigo	Doncaster Works	1731	February 1930	—	November 1964	Scrapped
2596	85	60085	Manna	Doncaster Works	1733	February 1930	—	October 1964	Scrapped
2597	86	60086	Gainsborough	Doncaster Works	1736	April 1930	—	November 1963	Scrapped
2598	87	60087	Blenheim	Doncaster Works	1743	June 1930	—	October 1963	Scrapped
2599	88	60088	Book Law	Doncaster Works	1744	July 1930	—	October 1963	Scrapped
2795	99	60099	Call Boy	Doncaster Works	1738	April 1930	—	October 1963	Scrapped
2796	100	60100	Spearmint	Doncaster Works	1741	May 1930	—	June 1965	Scrapped
2797	101	60101	Cicero	Doncaster Works	1742	June 1930	—	April 1963	Scrapped
2500	35	60035	Windsor Lad	Doncaster Works	1790	10 July 1934	—	4 September 1961	Scrapped at Doncaster Works on 30 September 1964.
2501	36	60036	Colombo	Doncaster Works	1791	July 1934	—	November 1964	Scrapped
2502	37	60037	Hyperion	Doncaster Works	1792	July 1934	—	December 1963	Scrapped
2503	38	60038	Firdaussi	Doncaster Works	1793	August 1934	—	November 1963	Scrapped
2504	39	60039	Sandwich	Doncaster Works	1794	9 September 1934	—	14 March 1963	Scrapped at Doncaster Works on 5 April 1963.
2505	40	60040	Cameronian	Doncaster Works	1795	October 1934	—	July 1964	Scrapped
2506	41	60041	Salmon Trout	Doncaster Works	1797	December 1934	—	December 1965	Scrapped at St Margaret's Shed, Edinburgh in April 1966. (Boiler, Cylinders and Chimney preserved as spares)
2507	42	60042	Singapore	Doncaster Works	1798	December 1934	—	July 1964	Scrapped
2508	43	60043	Brown Jack	Doncaster Works	1800	February 1935	—	May 1964	Scrapped

== Non-racehorse names ==
GNR no. 1470 was named Great Northern when new in April 1922 in honour of the Great Northern Railway, which was to lose its identity at the end of the year; similarly, GNR no. 1471 was named Sir Frederick Banbury in September 1922, in honour of the final Chairman of the GNR. The first Chairman of the LNER was honoured in the same way in 1924 when LNER no. 2563 was named William Whitelaw.

No. 4472 was named Flying Scotsman after the 10 am express service from King's Cross to Edinburgh Waverley; the name was applied in February 1924 just before the locomotive was sent to the British Empire Exhibition.

The year 1925 was the centenary of the Stockton and Darlington Railway, an LNER ancestor, and the first A1 built at Doncaster in that year, no. 2555, was accordingly named Centenary.

No. 2579 was named Dick Turpin (by February 1926), but at the time there was no distinguished racehorse of this name; the name refers to the well-known highwayman. Subsequently, a racehorse named Dick Turpin (foaled in 1929) won the 1933 Chester Cup.

No. 2553 was renamed Prince of Wales on 11 November 1926 following the visit of the future King Edward VIII to Doncaster Works a few days earlier; no. 2553 was one of the locomotives he had inspected there.

No. 2564 was named Knight of the Thistle after the racehorse owned by Mr H. McCalmont which won the 1897 Royal Hunt Cup. On 28 December 1932, whilst the locomotive was in Doncaster Works for general repair, new nameplates were fitted reading Knight of Thistle, which was meaningless both for the order and for the racehorse.
