= Mark Watson (archaeologist) =

The Hon. (Richard) Mark Watson (18 July 1906 – 12 March 1979) of London, England and of Nicasio, California, was a British diplomat who developed a special interest in the archaeology of Iceland. He is credited with having saved the Icelandic Sheepdog breed from extinction and was author of The Icelandic Dog 874 – 1956: A Research on the Iceland Dog (also Known as the Icelandic Sheepdog) (Nicasio, 1956), the most comprehensive research on that breed. He was a generous benefactor to Iceland and in April 1965 was decorated by the Icelandic President with the medal Stórriddarakross with a star (the Icelandic Order of the Falcon).

== Origins ==
He was the fourth and youngest son of Joseph Watson, 1st Baron Manton (1873–1922), a wealthy English industrialist from Leeds in Yorkshire.

== Career ==
He attended Eton College and later served as attaché at the British Embassy in Washington DC (1930–2) and in Paris (1932–4). During WW II he served as a Flight Lieutenant in the Royal Air Force Volunteer Reserve and in Austria worked for the Monuments, Fine Arts, and Archives program established in 1943 to help protect cultural property in war areas.

=== Work in Iceland ===
Early in his life he developed a passion for Iceland, and first visited that island in 1937, when he organised an expedition with packhorses to remote areas, and returned the next year for more exploration.

==== Restoration of Glaumbær ====
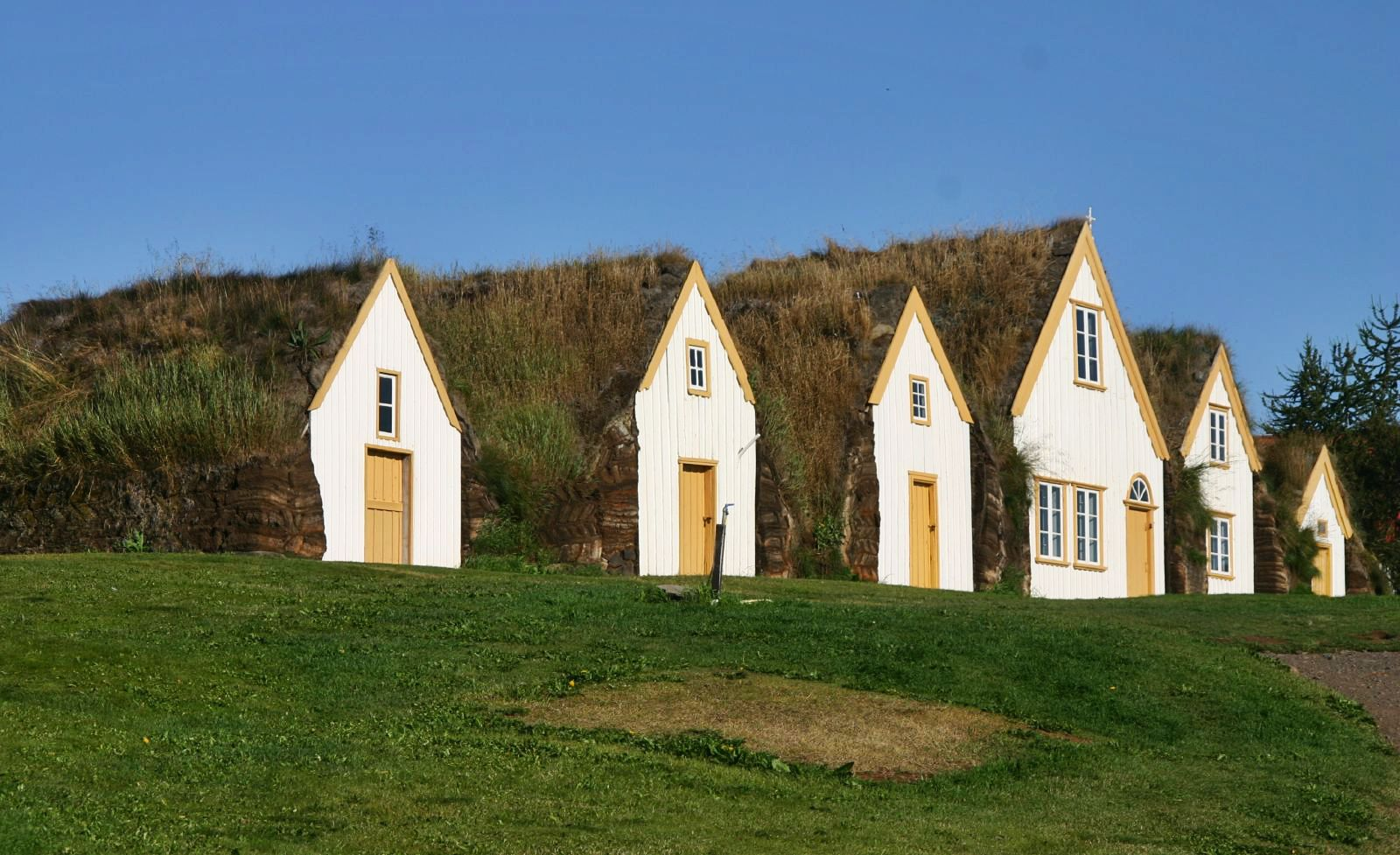
Glaumbær Farm, Skagafjordur, Iceland, conserved by Mark Watson in 1938, who on seeing it had become "absolutely enthralled". It is now one of the finest museums of its kind in Iceland

He was a great benefactor of both Skagafjörður and Icelanders. He made a significant donation toward the conservation of Glaumbær, a traditional turf farmhouse in Skagafjordur, then together with many others in danger of disintegration due to neglect, and in 1938 was made an honorary member of the Society of Archaeologists, Iceland.

=== Dog breeder ===
His work, The Icelandic Dog 874 – 1956: A Research on the Iceland Dog (also Known as the Icelandic Sheepdog) (Nicasio, 1956), is the most comprehensive research on the Icelandic Sheepdog ever made. He created a breeding program in Iceland and established Wensom Kennels at his ranch at Nicasio, California, having selected and imported ten pure types which he found on isolated farms situated in the most remote valleys and fjords. He is credited with having saved the breed from extinction by mixture with other imported breeds, mainly collies, and established its gene pool. He also imported Icelandic ponies to California. He promoted the foundation of the Icelandic Kennel Club and became an honorary founding member. He supported animal rights activists in Iceland and in 1973 gave the nation its first fully equipped veterinary hospital, at Víðidalur, near Reykjavík, which is named after him. He also established a dog hospital and museum in Iceland.

=== Donation of artworks ===
He donated a valuable library (1,310 works) to the Icelandic National Library, and to The National Museum of Iceland he donated more than 100 watercolour paintings by William Gershom Collingwood, an English painter who travelled in Iceland at the end of the 19th century.

== Assessment ==
Iceland designated an official annual holiday in Mark's honor for his lifelong love of and generosity toward Iceland. He was described as "one of the most generous friends of Iceland who has presented to Icelanders more items of cultural value than any other foreign citizen", and it was said of him: "we can never fully express our gratitude to Watson, this generous and noble lover of both animals and Iceland. He should be thanked more than has been done up to now. He has presented such valuable gifts to this country, expressed such true friendship in his actions, that it is more our own honour, than his, to make him a honorary citizen" and: "I have never met a man of foreign origin that loved Iceland, both the land and the people as faithfully as he did" (Anna S. Snorradóttir, Mark Watson and Glaumbaer). His birthday, the 18th of July, is known as the "Day of the Icelandic Sheep Dog".

== Death ==
He died in March 1979 at his home in Eaton Place, London, unmarried.
