= Chatelaine (horse) =

British-bred Thoroughbred racehorse

- Sire: Phalaris
- Grandsire: Polymelus
- Dam: Herself
- Damsire: Neil Gow
- Sex: Mare
- Foaled: 1930
- Died: 1937 (aged 6–7)
- Country: United Kingdom
- Colour: Bay
- Breeder: Sledmere Stud
- Owner: Ernest Thornton-Smith
- Trainer: Fred Templeman
- Record: 17: 4-2-2
- Earnings: £8,170 (in 1933)

Major wins
- Epsom Oaks (1933); Scarbrough Stakes (1933); Champion Stakes (1933)

Chatelaine (1930–1937) was a British Thoroughbred racehorse and broodmare. After failing to win in her first seven races she was still a maiden when she recorded a 25/1 upset victory in the Epsom Oaks. She went on to win the Scarbrough Stakes and dead-heated for the Champion Stakes as well as finishing second in the Jockey Club Stakes and finishing third in the Coronation Cup. She was retired to become a broodmare but died in 1937 after producing only two foals, neither of which survived.

== Background ==
Chatelaine was a bay mare bred by the Sledmere Stud in Driffield, Yorkshire. As a yearling she was bought for 500 guineas by C M Prior who then leased the filly to Ernest Thornton-Smith. She was trained during her racing career by Fred Templeman at Lambourn in Berkshire. As a young horse Chatelaine was extremely nervous and restless but her temperament improved when she was introduced to "Billy", a goat who became her constant companion.

Her sire Phalaris was a sprinter who went on to become the male-line ancestor of most modern Thoroughbreds. Chatelaine's other descendants have included Tom Rolfe, Sham, Ack Ack and Bee Bee Bee.

== Racing career ==
=== 1932: two-year-old season ===
Chatelaine failed to win in six starts as a two-year-old in 1932. Her best efforts came when finishing fourth in the Rous Memorial Stakes at Goodwood and in the Imperial Produce Stakes at Kempton Park Racecourse when she was a close third to colt Gino. She did not receive a weight in the official Free Handicap in which, unprecededently, the fillies Betty, Brown Betty and Myrobella jointly topped the ratings ahead of the best of the male juveniles.

=== 1933: three-year-old season ===
In the spring of 1933 Chatelaine contested the 1000 Guineas over the Rowley Mile at Newmarket Racecourse on 28 April and ran creditably to finish seventh of the twenty-two runners in a race which saw Brown Betty win from Fur Tor and Myrobella. At Epsom Racecourse on 2 of June Chatelaine, ridden by Sam Wragg, started a 25/1 outsider for the 155th running of the Oaks Stakes. The best-fancied fillies in the fourteen-runner field were Brown Betty, Lord Derby's Versicle and Lord Astor's Betty. The race took place in fine weather in front of a large crowd which included King George V and Queen Mary. Chatelaine upset the odds as she went to the front in the last quarter mile won by one and a half lengths from Solfatara, with the fast-finishing Fur Tor two lengths back in third place ahead of Brown Betty. Billy the goat, who had accompanied her to Epsom was reportedly there to greet her when she returned to her stable after the race.

On her first appearance after her Epsom victory, Chatelaine was dropped back in distance for the Coronation Stakes over one mile at Royal Ascot and finished unplaced behind Betty. At York Racecourse in September Chatelaine finished second to the Epsom Derby runner-up King Salmon in the Great Yorkshire Stakes over fourteen furlongs. Later that month she won the Scarbrough Stakes at Doncaster.

Chatelaine ran twice at Newmarket in autumn. The ten furlong Champion Stakes on 11 October saw the filly produce arguably her best performance. Ridden by Gordon Richards she dead-heated for first place with the Aga Khan's four-year-old colt Dastur after what was described as a "great duel", with the advantage passing back and forth over the last quarter mile. In the Jockey Club Cup on two weeks later she was tried over two and a quarter miles and finished second of the three runners, beaten one and a half lengths by Nitsichin, a five-year-old mare whose wins included the Irish Oaks and the Cesarewitch.

=== 1934: four-year-old season ===
As a four-year-old, Chatelaine's form was disappointing. She came home last of the three runners behind King Salmon and the American challenger Mate in the Coronation Cup and finished unplaced in the Ascot Gold Cup, won by Felicitation. She did win a race over an official distance one and a half miles at Hurst Park, and survived an objection by the owner of the runner-up, who claimed that the race had been incorrectly run over a longer distance.

== Assessment and honours ==
Chatelaine's earnings of £8,170 in 1933 made her the fifth most financially successful racehorse in England behind Hyperion, Colombo, Loaningdale (Eclipse Stakes) and Rodosto (2000 Guineas).

In their book, A Century of Champions, based on the Timeform rating system, John Randall and Tony Morris rated Chatelaine an "average" winner of the Oaks.

== Breeding record ==
After her racing career, Chatelaine was retired to become a broodmare. She produced two foals, by Dastur and Hyperion respectively, neither of which survived. She died shortly after the second confinement at the age of seven in May 1937.

== Pedigree ==
Pedigree of Chatelaine (GB), bay mare, 1930
| Sire Phalaris (GB) 1913 | Polymelus (GB); 1902 | Cyllene | Bona Vista |
| Sire Phalaris (GB) 1913 | Polymelus (GB); 1902 | Cyllene | Arcadia |
| Sire Phalaris (GB) 1913 | Polymelus (GB); 1902 | Maid Marian | Hampton |
| Sire Phalaris (GB) 1913 | Polymelus (GB); 1902 | Maid Marian | Quiver |
| Sire Phalaris (GB) 1913 | Bromus (GB); 1905 | Sainfoin | Springfield |
| Sire Phalaris (GB) 1913 | Bromus (GB); 1905 | Sainfoin | Sanda |
| Sire Phalaris (GB) 1913 | Bromus (GB); 1905 | Cheery | St Simon |
| Sire Phalaris (GB) 1913 | Bromus (GB); 1905 | Cheery | Sunrise |
| Dam Herself (GB) 1915 | Neil Gow (GB); 1907 | Marco | Barcaldine (IRE) |
| Dam Herself (GB) 1915 | Neil Gow (GB); 1907 | Marco | Novitiate |
| Dam Herself (GB) 1915 | Neil Gow (GB); 1907 | Chelandry | Goldfinch |
| Dam Herself (GB) 1915 | Neil Gow (GB); 1907 | Chelandry | Illuminata |
| Dam Herself (GB) 1915 | Aida (GB); 1898 | Galopin | Vedette |
| Dam Herself (GB) 1915 | Aida (GB); 1898 | Galopin | Flying Duchess |
| Dam Herself (GB) 1915 | Aida (GB); 1898 | Queen Adelaide | Hermit |
| Dam Herself (GB) 1915 | Aida (GB); 1898 | Queen Adelaide | Adelaide (Family 9-h) |
