= Lemonora (horse) =

British Thoroughbred racehorse

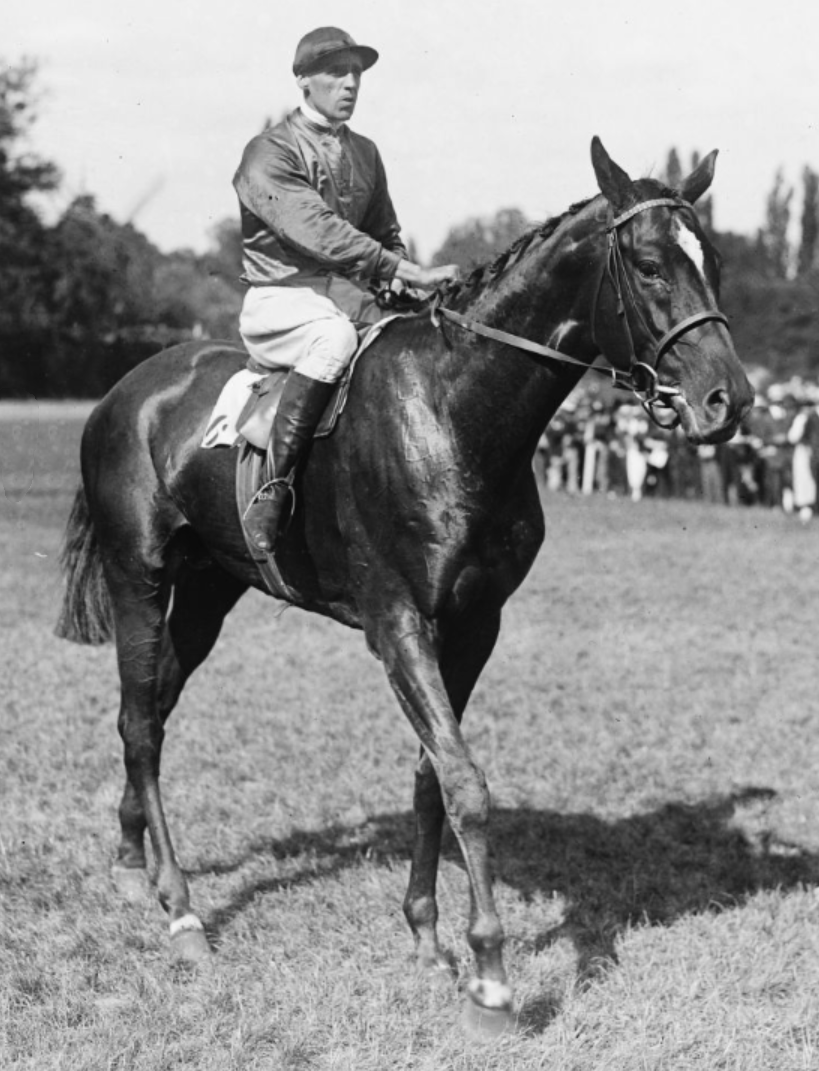
- Lemonora, ridden by Joe Childs, after winning the Grand Prix de Paris 1921
- Sire: Lemberg (1910 Derby winner, trained by Alec Taylor, Jr. at Manton in Wiltshire)
- Dam: Honora
- Damsire: Gallinule
- Sex: Stallion
- Foaled: 1918
- Country: United Kingdom
- Breeder: Sledmere Stud, Yorkshire
- Owner: Joseph Watson, 1st Baron Manton
- Trainer: Alec Taylor, Jr., Manton, Wiltshire
- Earnings: Won world's most valuable race Grand Prix de Paris (1921) 400,000 French Francs (about £16,830)

Major wins
- Won Grand Prix de Paris (1921); Champagne Stakes, Doncaster (1920)

Lemonora (foaled 1918) was a British Thoroughbred racehorse owned by Joseph Watson, 1st Baron Manton. Ridden by Joe Childs he won the Grand Prix de Paris on 26 June 1921, one mile seven furlongs, beating a large field, with a prize of 400,000 French Francs (about £16,830) then the world's most valuable racing prize. Just 26 days before, on 1 June 1921 he came third in the Derby, having in early May come second in the Classic 2000 Guineas at Newmarket. In 1920 he won the Champagne Stakes at Doncaster and came second in the Gimcrack Stakes at York.

His subsequent breeding career was disappointing, as he was "a bad sire". The unusually feminine sounding name for a stallion appears to be from a variety of azalea created in 1912 whose flowers are "moderate yellow, tinted pink externally".

Lemonora is immortalised in the 1935 Alfred Hitchcock film The 39 Steps when the names of the first three horses in the 1921 Derby are recounted on stage by "Mr Memory".
