= Joseph Watson, 1st Baron Manton =

English industrialist (1873–1922)

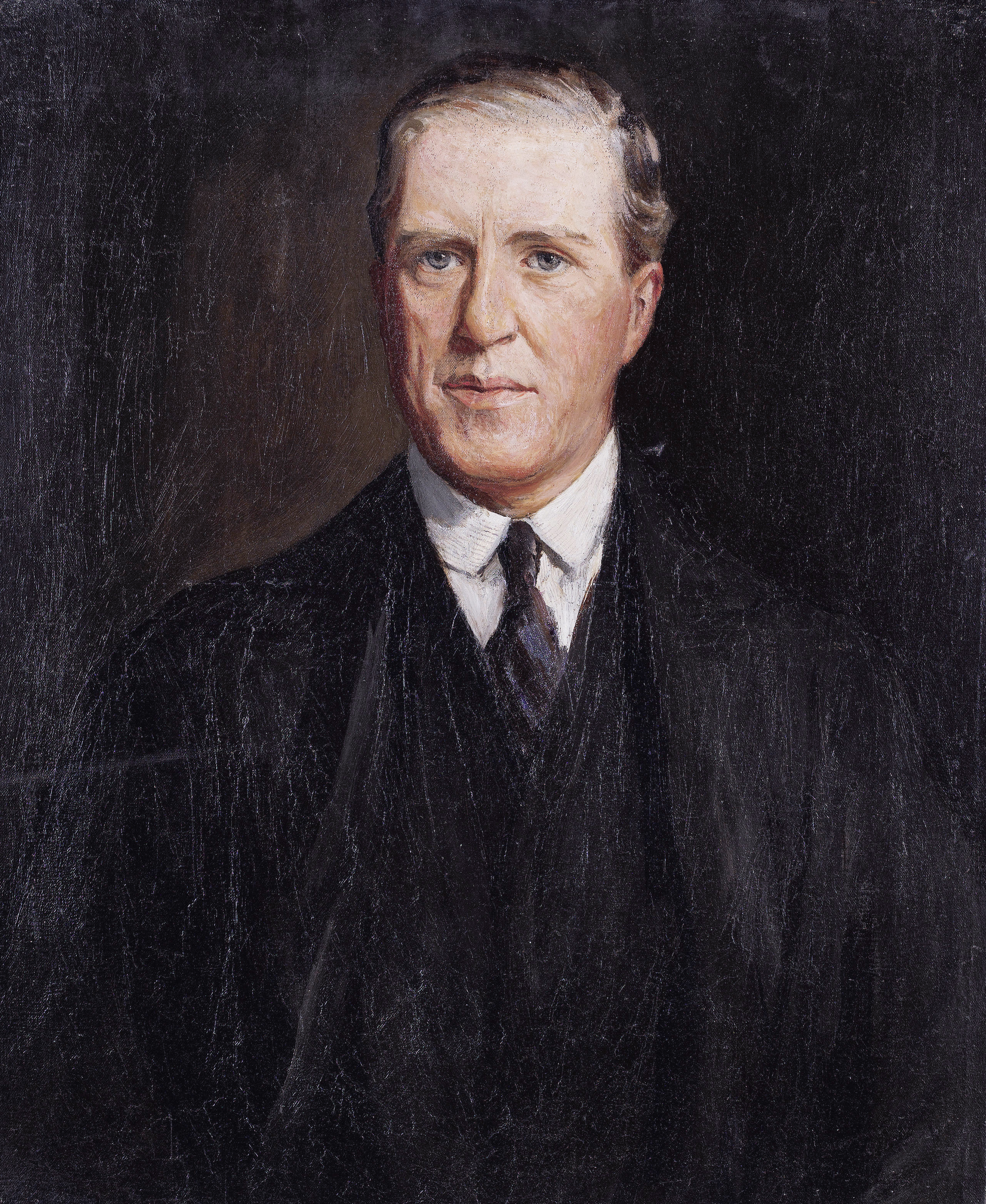
Joseph Watson, 1st Baron Manton, by John Lavery, 1922

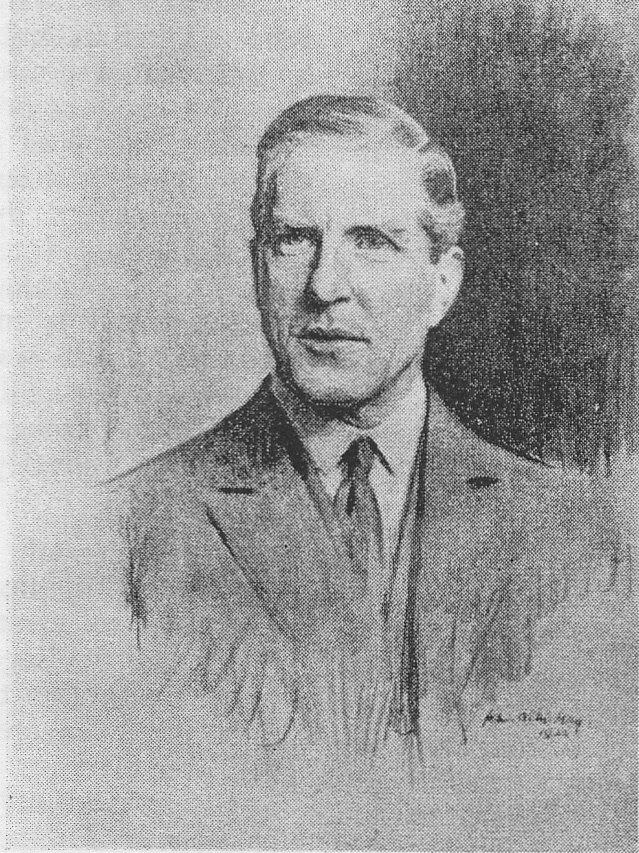
Joseph Watson, 1st Baron Manton. Portrait sketch by John A M Hay, 1923

Joseph Watson, 1st Baron Manton (10 February 1873 – 13 March 1922) was an English industrialist from Leeds, Yorkshire.

He was chairman of Joseph Watson & Sons Ltd, soap manufacturers of Leeds, and a director of the London and North-Western Railway, in the late 19th century the largest joint stock company in the world. He became in later life a pioneer of industrialised agriculture in England and a successful racehorse owner. He was step-great-grandfather to David Cameron, former Prime Minister of the United Kingdom.

== Early life ==
Watson was the only son of George Watson, soap manufacturer, of Donisthorpe House near Moor Allerton, Leeds, Yorkshire. He was educated at Repton School and Clare College, Cambridge. He was recalled to the family firm before completing his degree, becoming chairman at a young age.

== Soap business ==
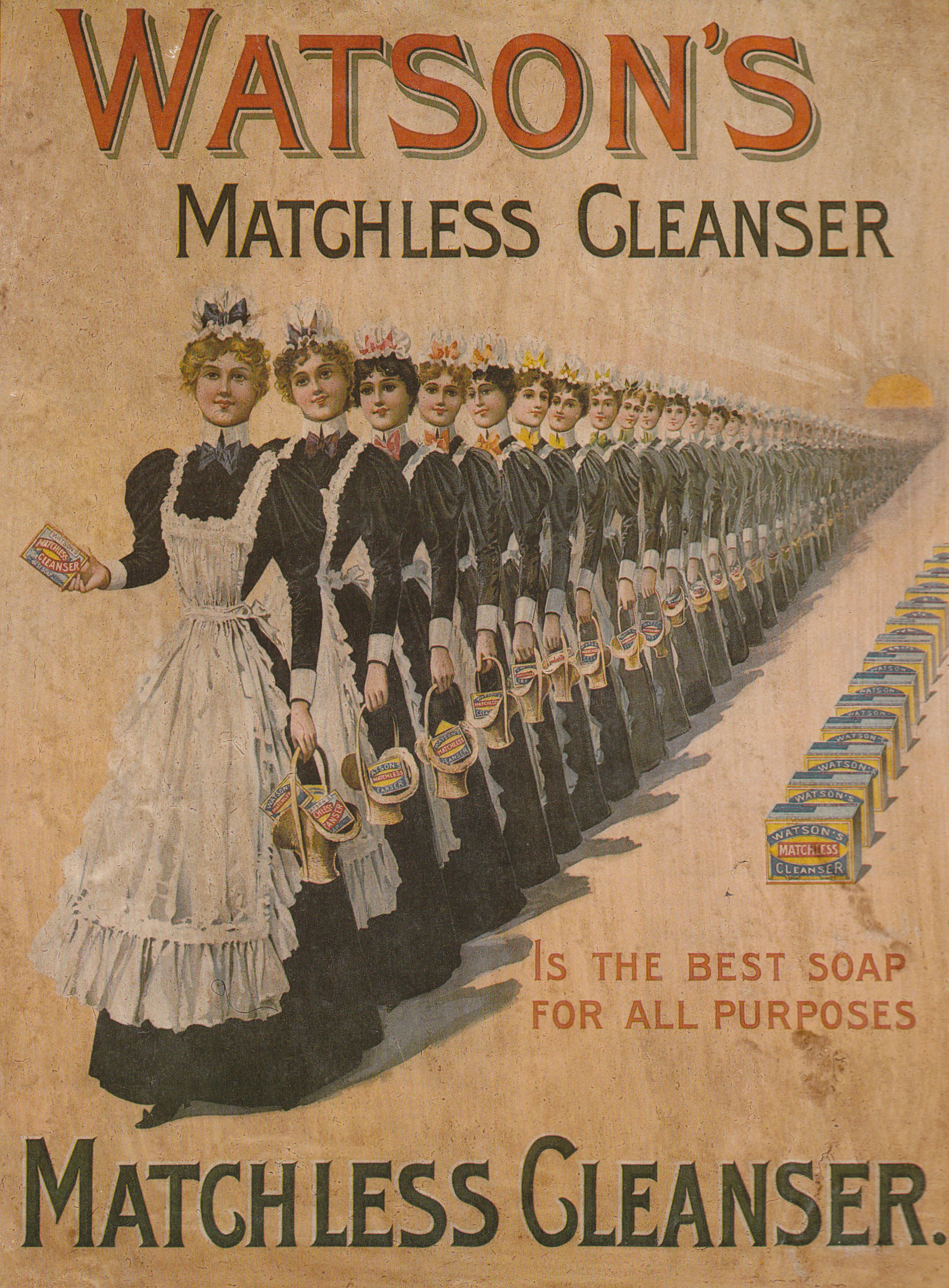
Advertisement for Watson's Matchless Cleanser soap, advertised in 1910 as "the most popular soap in Great Britain" Illustration by Howard Davie, August 1898. Other brands of Joseph Watson & Co Ltd were Sparkla polishing soap, Nubolic disinfectant soap, Venus toilet soap and Bumpo soap powder.

=== Joseph Watson & Sons ===
Joseph went to work at his grandfather's company, Joseph Watson & Sons, (Note: The limited company Joseph Watson & Sons had been founded by Joseph his grandfather and had grown out of a hide tanning business established by James Watson in 1816 at Woodside, Horsforth, 5 miles (8.0 km) NW of central Leeds. The business was an adjacent diversification from the small family farm, which covered the area between today's Outwood Lane and Broadway, with further rented ground to the SE. Additional rented land to the SE, comprising a handful of pastures, was on the Headingley estate of the Earl of Cardigan. The family also owned a paper mill at Woodside, and is believed to have built numerous stone houses for their workers in Paradise Place and Watson Row in Regent Road The former existence of the original business is today memorialised by the name of Tanhouse Hill Lane, to the east of which it stood, within a triangular site.) and turned the company from the medium-sized concern built up by his father and uncle Charles into one which ruled the soap market of North-East England, with national and international sales, becoming William Lever's biggest rival. (Note: Watson was amongst the first of the established manufacturers to follow Lever's heavy advertising and revolutionary marketing techniques, (Note: Lever started as a grocer who bought in soap from several suppliers, including Watson's, and branded them "Sunlight". Lever soon set up his own manufacturing plants, but by then Watson's had founded its own brands and independent marketing abilities.) offering prizes such as day trips to Brighton and visits to Paris to view the Grecian sculpture Venus de Milo, in exchange for soap wrapper returns. In 1885 production had been 100 tons per week, which rose fivefold by 1906. One of the by-products was glycerine, sold for the manufacture of explosives. The company, known locally as "Soapy Joe's" was based after 1861 at the Whitehall Road Soapworks, Leeds, strategically placed between the River Aire, from which palm oil shipped in from around the world was unloaded, and the former railway terminal, from which the finished product was dispatched. It became one of the largest employers in the city, producing brands such as "Matchless Cleanser", "Venus" and "Nubolic".)

=== Soap Trust monopoly ===
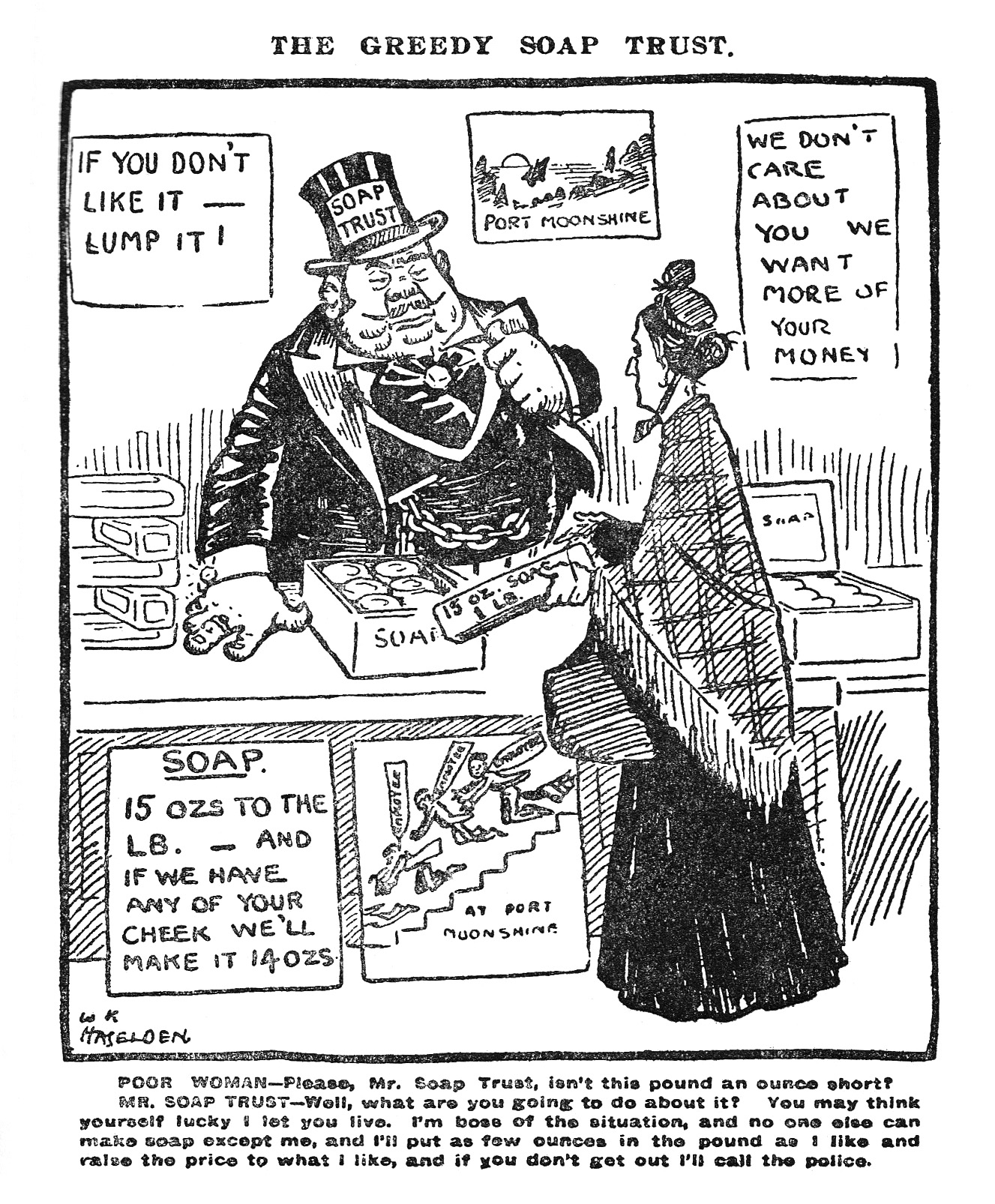
Cartoon in The Daily Mirror, 22 October 1906: a parody of William Lever, whose factory was named "Port Sunlight"

On 4 August 1906 Watson and William Lever, by then the largest manufacturer, met in the Grand Hotel in London to finalise a plan to set up a "Soap Trust" which would merge the major soap manufacturers into a monopoly, thereby gaining economies of scale in advertising and production costs. Watson favoured the use of a parent company whilst Lever preferred a scheme of exchange of shares between participating companies to bind them together. This occurred during a period of many corporate trusts in the United States. (Note: The scheme was in imitation of hundreds of similar trusts which had been established in the USA following John D. Rockefeller's pioneering organisation of the Standard Oil Co. in 1882 as a virtual monopoly combination of many small independent oil companies. The manufacturers in their idealism foresaw benefits from trusts to both consumer and producer from economies of scale, yet abuses occurred. A sugar trust evaded $4M of customs duty, and the creation of a beef trust seemed a threat to cheap food supplies. The dangers to the consumer were soon understood by the politicians and the Sherman Antitrust Act of 1890 was the response. The Act was not totally successful and Theodore Roosevelt in his second presidency launched a new "trust-busting" policy at about the same time the British soap trust was being established.) The scheme was strongly opposed by the Daily Mail newspaper which campaigned for a boycott by its readers of the trust brands. Profits at participating firms were thereby severely reduced. The Northcliffe Press in its expanding and highly popular campaign overstepped the mark by falsely asserting trust soaps were made from scented fish oil. Although Watson and Lever won substantial libel damages from the press, losses in reputation and profits had been suffered all round. On the proposal of Watson and Crosfield, another large manufacturer, the scheme was abandoned in November 1906. By then Watson had already disposed of much of his shareholding, previously all held by himself and his uncle Charles, to William Lever, in exchange for Lever Brothers shares to set up the trust.

=== Lever Brothers and Jurgens ===
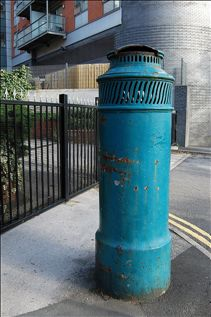
"Soapy Joe's Shaft", Whitehall Rd. Leeds. A surviving ventilation shaft of the former Leeds Electricity Dept., which sub-station stood adjacent on the north to Whitehall Soap Works

In 1912/13 Watson sold much of his remaining shareholding to Lever (Lever Brothers Ltd., later Unilever) and sold to him the remainder in July 1917, but remained as chairman. In July 1915 he had sold to Lever his half share in the Planter's Margarine Co Ltd, a joint venture established in November 1914 at Godley in Cheshire with Levers, in response to Government anxiety at the wartime loss of Dutch supplies, which by 1915 was the country's second largest margarine manufacturer. He had supplied it from his Olympia Oil & Cake Co. Ltd. at Selby, Yorks which operated the largest linseed oil crushing and refining plant in Europe. It also hardened whale oil and in 1917 during WWI was allocated by the government 21% (later 25%) of British whale oil for hardening. Watson then suffered substantial losses in an unsuccessful speculation in linseed, and he sold Olympia Oil & Cake to the Dutch firm Jurgens, which had outbid Levers.

== Pioneer of industrialised agriculture ==
Spurred on by wartime food shortages, Watson began pioneering industrialised agriculture, and he funded an "Agricultural Research Department" on his estate at Offchurch near Leamington Spa in Warwickshire. He founded the Olympia Agricultural Co Ltd and invested much of his money into agricultural and sporting estates totalling some 20,000 acres (81 km^{2}) at Selby in Yorkshire, Manton Down (5,500 acres) in Wiltshire, Sudbourne Hall (9,000 acres) in Suffolk; Compton Verney and nearby Offchurch Bury (2,700 acres) both in Warwickshire; and at Thorney in Cambridgeshire.

His Olympia Oil & Cake Co. under the brand name "OCO" produced animal feed for dairy cows, calves, lambs and pigs, all from the new source of linseed oil. The company acquired sites near Selby within the parish of Barlby in 1909–10, and their buildings later dominated the road and river frontages. Soon after 1910 the company built the first "village estate" of workers' housing in the area, which was later expanded by other nearby employers. Before 1921 the Olympia Hotel opened near the site at Barlby Bank, taking its name from the company and using a sign showing seed-crushing machinery. The company in 1952 became part of British Oil and Cake Mills Ltd.

Following Manton's death his executors claimed he had put £1 million into agriculture and received £750,000 from sales of the properties.

A 1921report by the U.S. Department of Agriculture reported:

The Olympia Agricultural Company, Ltd., is a British syndicate which has purchased agricultural estates aggregating 20,000 acres in the counties of Yorkshire, Northamptonshire, Cambridgeshire, Suffolk, Warwickshire, and Wiltshire. A research department has recently been organized under the direction of Dr. Charles Crowther, professor of agricultural chemistry in the University of Leeds and director of the institute for research in animal nutrition in that university. ... The headquarters of the department have been located on the company's estate of about 2,700 acres at Offchurch, near Leamington, in Warwickshire, where the ancient mansion of Offchurch Bury is being adapted to provide the necessary laboratories and other improvements which are now approaching completion. ... It is stated that liberal financial provision for the research department has been made by the company."

== Wartime munitions work ==
Telegram of 21 June 1916 from Lloyd George to Watson; Amatol is an explosive consisting of TNT and Ammonium Nitrate

At the start of the First World War, Watson's industrial and organisational expertise was used to assist the government in the establishment and operation of national munitions factories, most notably at the First National Shell Filling Factory at Barnbow, Leeds.

Following the heavy consumption of munitions in the opening battles of WWI at the Somme, the Northcliffe Press (Daily Mail) brought to the public's attention what became known as "The Shell Crisis", signifying that the nation had given little thought to securing long-term munitions supplies needed to successfully wage an unprecedented protracted war. The Asquith government fell, to be replaced by that of Lloyd George, recently appointed Minister of Munitions to resolve the crisis. Watson, as chairman of a six-man "Leeds Munitions Committee" made up from local industrialists in August 1915, was charged by the government to immediately establish the first of 12 National Shell Filling Factories. A factory was promptly established on a 400-acre (1.6 km^{2}) greenfield site at Barnbow, close to Leeds. It resembled a small town of detached houses and huts more than a traditional factory, to contain and localise any accidental explosions. It remained the largest such operation in the country, having despatched 566,000 tons of finished ammunition overseas by the Armistice. At its height it employed 16,000 workers, 93% of whom were women and girls. (Note: Two members of the directing board were on duty at Barnbow every day, and the board met at least once a month to receive reports. The factory was largely self-contained for reasons of national security, operating under great secrecy. It operated its own farm including dairy and slaughterhouse. Kitchens and accounting department were equipped with the latest electric machinery. Nursing facilities and dentists were provided.) Its fire brigade responded to three accidental explosions, the most serious of which occurred in 1916, killing 35 women and injuring many more. (Note: Due to wartime censorship, no public account of the accidents was made. The memorials to these unfortunate victims are almost the only trace which remains of the operation on the site today.)

== Racehorse owner ==
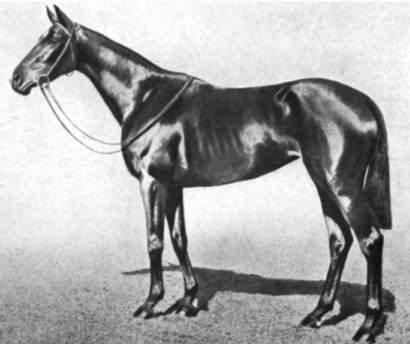
Love-in-Idleness, Watson's winner of the 1921 Oaks. A portrait of the horse was painted by Lynwood Palmer

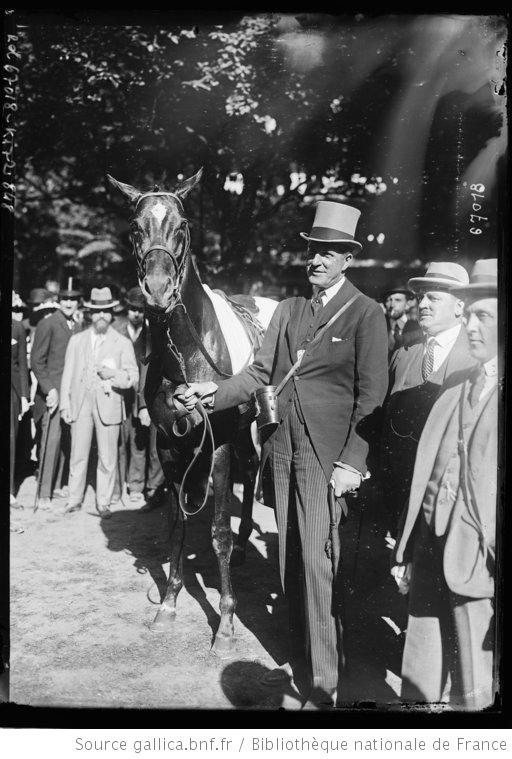
Watson with his colt Lemonora after winning the Grand Prix de Paris at Longchamp on 26 June 1921. For moving images see British Pathe "World's Richest Racing Prize. "Lemonora" wins Grand Prix for Mr "Lucky" Watson"

Watson hunted with the Bramham Moor foxhounds in Yorkshire, near his home at Linton Spring, Wetherby. He was a prominent racehorse owner and in 1918 acquired from Alec Taylor, Jr. the famous Manton training establishment near Marlborough in Wiltshire, going on to spend £30,000 on yearlings. In 1921 he won The Oaks with Love in Idleness, and the Grand Prix de Paris, the world's richest racing prize (400,000 Francs), with Lemonora which also had gained third place in the Derby that year, all ridden by jockey Joe Childs. He was termed by the racing press Mr "Lucky" Watson.

== Philanthropy ==
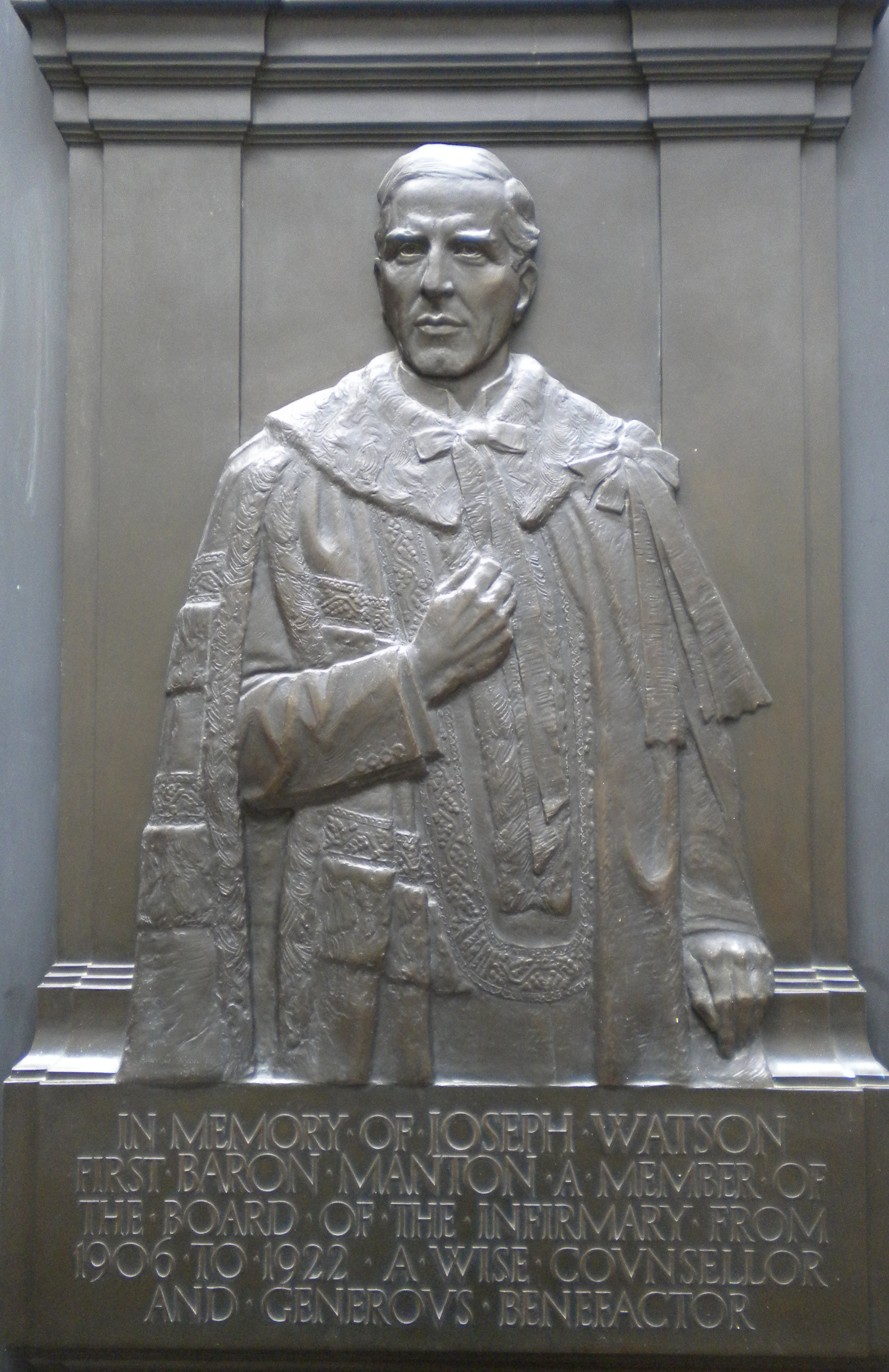
Monument to Watson in Leeds General Infirmary

In 1921 Watson donated £50,000 to the Leeds General Infirmary, of which he was a board member from 1906 to his death. The monies were used to replace some of its investments which had to be sold during WWI. A half-length bronze bas-relief portrait of Watson in his baronial robes is displayed there in the George Street entrance hall, under which is inscribed A Wise Counsellor and Generous Benefactor.

== Elevation to the peerage ==
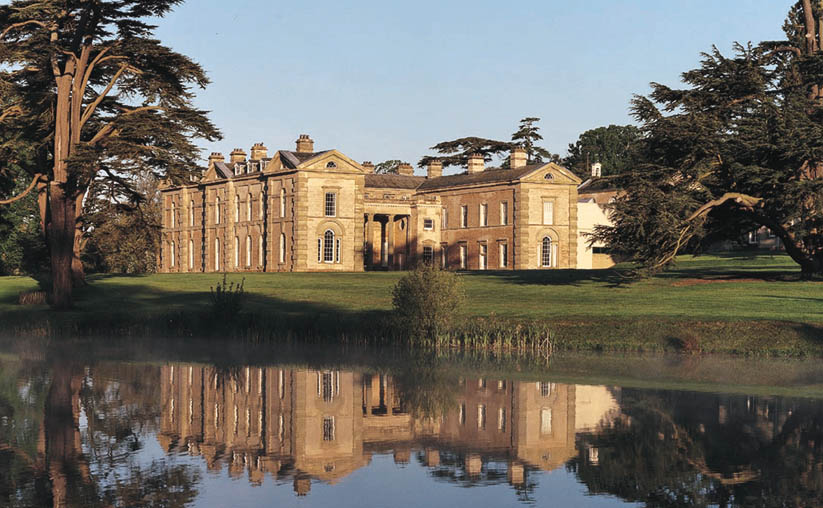
Compton Verney, Warwickshire.

On 25 January 1922 he was raised to the peerage for his war services as Baron Manton of Compton Verney in the County of Warwick. He had purchased the Robert Adam neo-classical mansion Compton Verney and its 5,079-acre (20.55 km^{2}) estate in 1921 from Lord Willoughby de Broke, intending to make his seat there, which intention was not realised due to his sudden death in March 1922, before having taken up residence. (Note: Conveyance 30 November 1921 DR 951/6/1 Warks. Archives.) Whether his elevation, at the behest of Lloyd-George, was the result of a political donation, has not been proved but the title is not amongst those generally quoted by commentators as falling into this category. (Note: The title was created in the New Year's Honours List, not the "notorious" Birthday Honours List of June.)

== Armorials ==
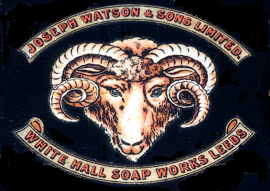
1906 Ram's head trademark of Joseph Watson & Sons Ltd. Detail from design on one of 500 promotional sewing machines given as prizes by the company in 1906. Collection of Abbey House Museum, Leeds

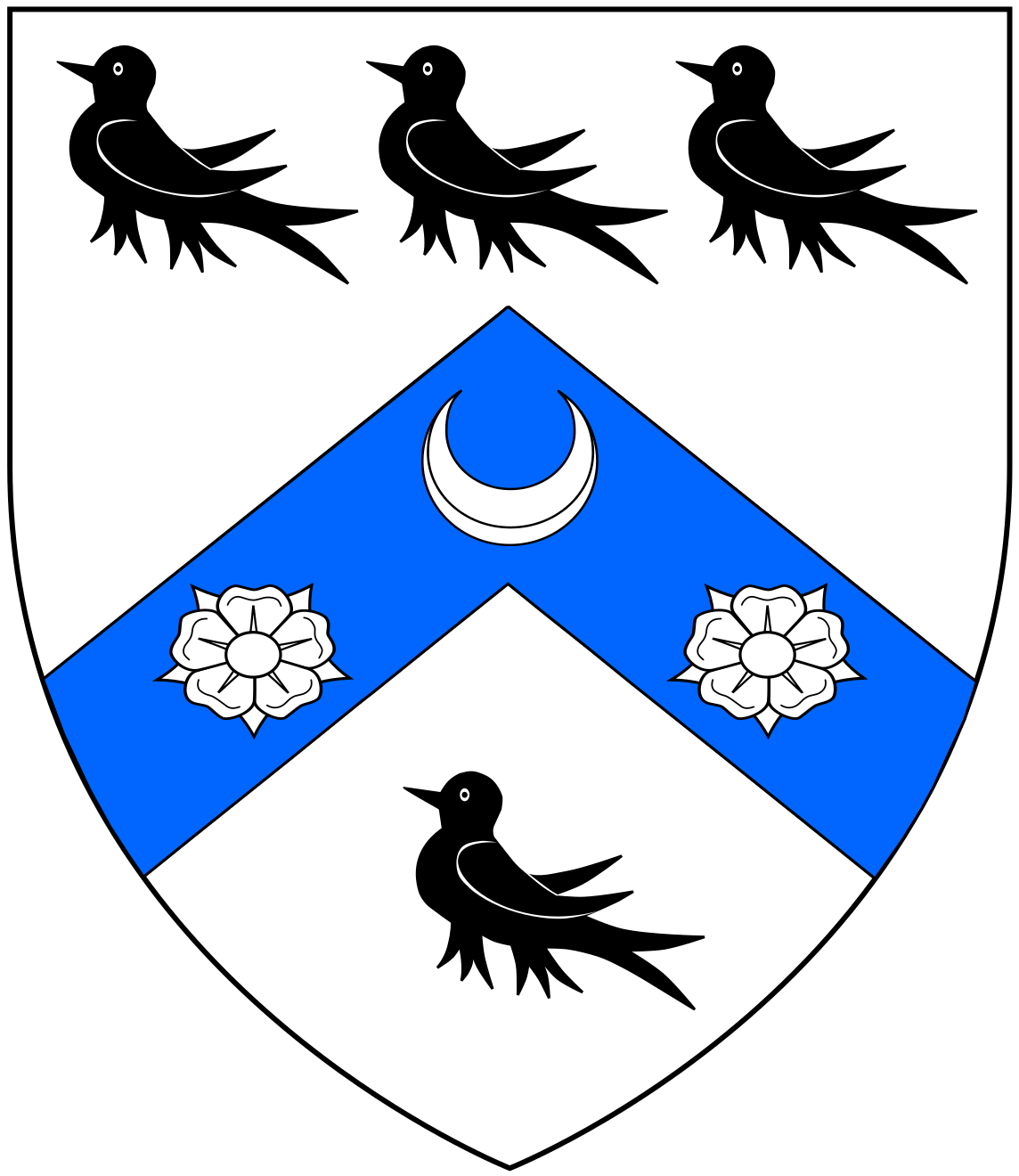
Arms of Baron Manton: Argent, on a chevron azure between 4 martlets 3 in-chief and 1 in-base sable a crescent between 2 roses of the field

Joseph Watson adopted, or was allocated by the heralds, (Note: Seemingly the practice for most 20th-century Watson baronets also) a variation of the armorials of the Watson Earls of Rockingham, which earldom had become extinct in 1746 on the death of Thomas Watson, 3rd Earl of Rockingham. The arms of Baron Manton became :"Argent, on a chevron azure between 4 martlets 3 in-chief and 1 in-base sable a crescent between 2 roses of the field". For supporters he also adopted a variant of Rockingham: "On either side a gryphon per fesse azure and argent, charged on the shoulder with a rose also argent". The arms of the Earls of Rockingham were: "Argent, on a chevron azure between 3 martlets sable as many crescents or". The Rockingham supporters were: "2 griffins argent ducally gorged or". Manton adopted the Rockingham motto without alteration: "Mea Gloria Fides" (Trust is my Renown). For his crest, Manton adopted a variant of the oak tree arms of the 17th-century Watson family of Saughton, Edinburgh: crest of Baron Manton: "a gryphon passant sable in front of an oak tree proper". The armourials of Watson of Saughton were: "Argent, an oak tree growing out of a mount in base proper surmounted of a fess azure". The latter family was granted in 1818 the griffin supporters of the Earls of Rockingham, noted above.

== Marriage and progeny ==
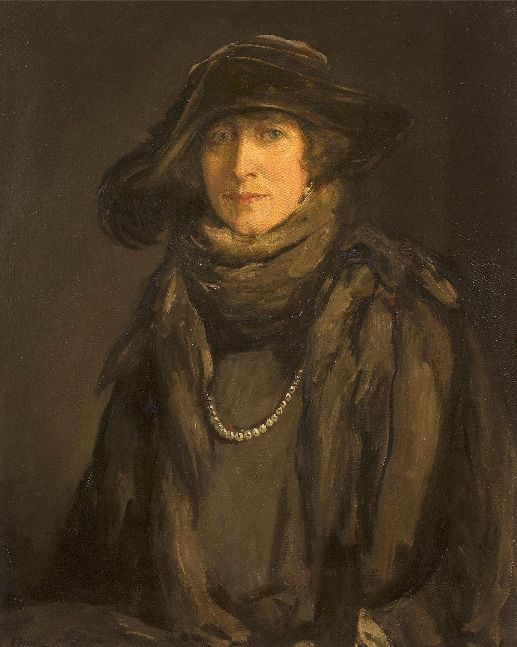
Lady Manton, née Claire Nickols, wife of Joseph Watson, 1st Baron Manton, 1922 portrait by John Lavery matching portrait by same artist of Lord Manton

In 1898 Joseph Watson married (Frances) Claire Nickols (d.1944), 3rd daughter of Harold Nickols (1848–1925), of Sandford House, Kirkstall, Leeds, proprietor of "Joppa Tannery", 87 Kirkstall Road, Leeds. Joppa Tannery was built in 1828 by Harold's father Richard Nickols as an expansion from the small tannery he had established in Bramley in 1823. The Joppa Tannery employed 300–400 people at its height and produced "upper leather" for shoes. It closed briefly but was re-openrd by Harold Nickols in 1900 under the name "Harold Nickols Ltd". It continued to be run by Harold's son Richard III Nickols, and closed in 1955. Watson had four sons by Claire Nickols:

- (George) Miles Watson, 2nd Baron Manton (1899–1968), who after a brief military career, with his younger brother Robert continued his father's race-horse breeding programme, as a director of "Newmarket Bloodstock Ltd."
- Robert Fraser Watson (1900–1975), ("Bobbie") with his eldest brother a director of "Newmarket Bloodstock Ltd." Destined for the army he attended Wellington College and Sandhurst and Trinity College, Cambridge, where he was Master of the Cambridge University Draghounds. His military career was cut short by tuberculosis and to recuperate he moved to Kenya Colony, where he became a member of the Happy Valley set. In March 1927 he became engaged to Beryl Clutterbuck (later Beryl Markham), the Colony's "Golden Girl", a racehorse trainer and later a pioneer aviator who became the first woman to fly across the Atlantic from east to west. The engagement was cancelled only 5 months later when she became engaged instead to Mansfield Markham, which change "produced a great deal of amused speculation within the (Kenya) Colony, whose chief occupation and innocent delight was social gossip". Markham did not long retain her affections as in 1929 she commenced a very public affair with Prince Henry, Duke of Gloucester, son of King George V. "A generally held opinion was that Watson had a lucky escape". Watson himself had an interest in flying and in 1935 acquired an Avro 643 Cadet Mk.II bi-plane, sold in 1937 to the Spanish Republican Air Force. Watson later served as deputy-chairman of the Hospitals for the Diseases of the Chest, today the Royal Brompton Hospital in London. His racehorse Dick Turpin won the 1933 Chester Cup, ridden by Gordon Richards. In 1943 he sold his Dorset estate including Peggs Farm, Vale Farm and Manor Farm in the parishes of Sutton Waldron and Iwerne Minster to Lord Beaverbrook. In December 1948 at Newmarket he sold his 7-year-old brood mare Ferry Pool for 18,000 guineas, a record price in England. He was step-grandfather to David Cameron, former Prime Minister of the United Kingdom.
- Alastair Joseph Watson (1901–1955), whose share of his paternal inheritance included the remnant of the Sudbourne Estate in Suffolk, 7,650 acres of which were advertised for sale as "the late Lord Manton's Suffolk estate" in the Times newspaper of 31 March 1922, in order to pay death duties. The 1,200 acre Chillesford Lodge Estate, the estate's Victorian "model farm" built in 1875 by Sir Richard Wallace, 1st Baronet of Sudbourne Hall, the noted art collector and illegitimate son of the 4th Marquess of Hertford, where the Red Poll breed of cattle had been developed in the 19th century, is retained in 2015 by his descendants. The famous "Sudbourne" prefixed herds of Red Poll cattle and the famous "Sudbourne" stud of Suffolk Punch heavy horses, were retained by Watson and won several prizes. In 1936 he built the Chillesford Polo Ground, a private club open to family and friends where teams played by invitation only. It represented "country polo at its best" and used an advanced system of irrigation sprinklers, then unique in England, imported by Watson from the USA where he had seen them in use at the Santa Barbara Polo Club in California. Spectators were encouraged and were admitted free of charge, with printed programmes with colour covers provided, a further innovation for a small polo club at the time. The club closed during World War II but re-opened in 1948. He was trampled by ponies during a polo match, which led to his death some months later. After this the polo ground was ploughed up.
- (Richard) Mark Watson (1906–1979), a diplomat who served as attaché at the British Embassy in Washington DC (1930–1932) and in Paris (1932–1934). In 1965 he was decorated with the Icelandic Order of the Falcon. Unmarried.

== Death and burial ==
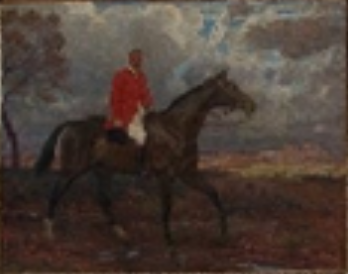
Joseph Watson mounted on a hunter, by Lynwood Palmer

He died in March 1922, aged only 49, from a heart-attack, whilst out hunting beside two of his sons. They were with the Warwickshire Foxhounds, at Upper Quinton, close to his new mansion. He died having held his title for less than two months. He was buried at his nearby manor of Offchurch, in his hunting apparel. His estate was sworn for probate at exactly one million pounds. A portrait of Joseph Watson mounted on a hunter was painted by Lynwood Palmer, together with a painting by the same artist of his racehorse Love-in-Idleness.

== Notes ==
Peerage of the United Kingdom
New creation	Baron Manton; 1922	Succeeded by George Miles Watson
