= Mid-day Sun =

British-bred Thoroughbred racehorse

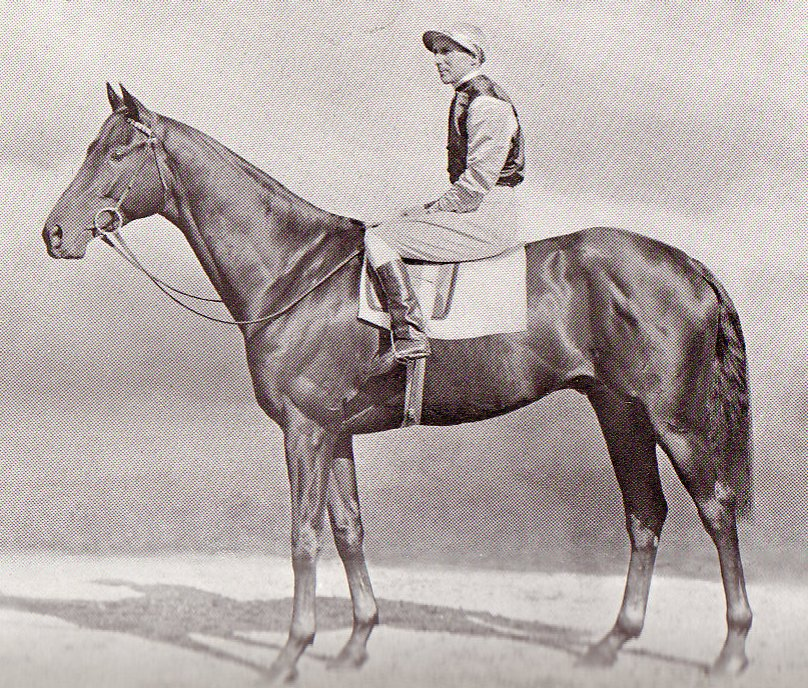
- Mid-day Sun, ridden by Michael Beary, in 1937 in a photograph by Frank Griggs
- Sire: Solario
- Grandsire: Gainsborough
- Dam: Bridge of Allan
- Damsire: Phalaris
- Sex: Stallion
- Foaled: 1934
- Country: United Kingdom
- Colour: Bay
- Breeder: William Thomas Sears
- Owner: Lettice Miller (Mrs G. B. Miller)
- Trainer: Fred Butters
- Record: 15: 6-1-2
- Earnings: £

Major wins
- Free Handicap (1937); Lingfield Derby Trial (1937); Epsom Derby (1937); Hardwicke Stakes (1937)

Mid-day Sun (1934–1954) was a British Thoroughbred racehorse and sire. After showing little promise as a two-year-old in 1936, Mid-day Sun improved into top class performer at three. In 1937 he won five races including The Derby and the Hardwicke Stakes at Royal Ascot. He was retired to stud in 1938 but had little success as a stallion. He was the first winner of the Derby at Epsom to be owned by a woman.

== Background ==
Mid-day Sun was a bay horse bred in England by W. T. Sears. As a yearling he was sent to the sales at Newmarket but attracted little interest and did not reach his reserve price of 2,000 guineas. Shortly afterwards, a private sale was arranged by the trainer Fred Butters, acting on the advice of his more famous elder brother Frank, and the colt entered the ownership of Lettice Miller (officially Mrs G. B. Miller). Butters, took charge of the colt’s training at his stables at Kingsclere, Berkshire.

Mid-day Sun’s sire, Solario was an outstanding racehorse who won the Coronation Cup and the Ascot Gold Cup in 1926, before going on to be Champion sire three times. His dam, Bridge of Allan, was a minor winner and a half sister of the 2000 Guineas runner-up Knockando.

== Racing career ==
=== 1936: two-year-old season ===
Mid-day Sun did little in his two-year-old season to suggest that he was a potential Classic winner. He lost his first six races, his best effort coming when he finished sixth to Perifox in the Richmond Stakes at Goodwood. At Newmarket on October 13 Mid-day Sun recorded his first win when carrying a light weight in a one-mile Nursery (a handicap race for two-year-olds). He then finished second in a similar event at the same course two weeks later, failing to give seventeen pounds to the winner. At the end of the season he was rated on 99 pounds, more than thirty pounds below the top-rated colt Foray.

=== 1937: three-year-old season ===
On his three-year-old debut, Mid-day Sun won the Free Handicap at Newmarket in April, receiving six pounds from the filly Exhibitionnist. The form of the race did not look particularly strong, but was boosted later in the year when the runner-up won both the 1000 Guineas and the Oaks. On his next start, Mid-day Sun proved himself capable of competing with the best colts by finishing third of the eighteen runners behind Le Ksar and Goya in the 2000 Guineas. He then prepared for the Derby by winning a slowly run race for the Lingfield Derby Trial. In the build-up to the Classic he was reported to be "in demand" in the betting market but was not among the favourites.

At Epsom, Mid-day Sun was ridden by the Irish jockey Michael Beary and started at odds of 100/7 (just over 14/1) in a field of twenty-one. The race was run in bright sunshine in front of the customary immense crowd including the King and Queen. Mid-day Sun was held up in the early stages as Renardo and then Fairford led the field. Le Grand Duc moved into the lead from Goya in the straight, heading a closely packed group of seven horses, with Beary moving his horse into contention. Mid-day Sun produced a “dazzling run” to move through the middle of the group, and pass Le Grand Duc inside the final furlong. Once in front, he held off the late challenge of Sandsprite to win by one and a half lengths. Mrs Miller called the result "the moment of my life" before explaining that she would prefer to celebrate with "a cup of tea" followed by a quiet dinner with her husband and mother. Beary felt that the colt had been "running lazily" in the early stages, but said that he had "responded gallantly" at the finish. The quality of the race was, however, questioned by some including the Sunday Times who pointed out that the proximity of the 100/1 outsider Sandsprite made the form look suspect.

Mid-day Sun was then sent to Royal Ascot where he was matched against leading older horses including the American-bred Flares in the Hardwicke Stakes. He took the lead early in the straight and pulled clear to win decisively, returning to "a big reception". According to Butters, the race "took nothing out of him", and he was then aimed at the St Leger at Doncaster. He prepared for the Classic by winning the Manton Stakes at Salisbury on August 23. In the St Leger Mid-day Sun started favourite but Beary struggled to obtain a clear run in the straight and although the colt finished strongly he finished third, beaten just over a length by Chulmleigh with Fair Copy second.

=== 1938: four-year-old season ===
Mid-day Sun was kept in training as a four-year-old and aimed at the Ascot Gold Cup. His temperament became a problem however and it proved impossible to train him effectively. He was retired to stud without racing in 1938.

== Assessment ==
Mid-day Sun was officially rated the best three-year-old colt of 1937 by the Jockey club handicapper. In their book A Century of Champions, John Randall and Tony Morris rated Mid-day Sun on 126, making him a “poor” Derby winner.

== Stud career ==
Mid-day Sun was not a successful stallion although his opportunities were limited by his standing at a small stud farm during wartime. His best offspring was Sterope, a leading miler who won the Cambridgeshire Handicap twice, but was excluded from most top events by his status as a gelding. In 1950 Mid-day Sun was exported to New Zealand where he died in 1954.

== Sire line tree ==
- Mid-day Sun
  - Alonzo
    - Rising Fast
  - Sterope

== Pedigree ==
Pedigree of Mid-day Sun (GB), bay stallion, 1934
| Sire Solario (IRE) 1922 | Gainsborough; 1915 | Bayardo | Bay Ronald |
| Sire Solario (IRE) 1922 | Gainsborough; 1915 | Bayardo | Galicia |
| Sire Solario (IRE) 1922 | Gainsborough; 1915 | Rosedrop | St Frusquin* |
| Sire Solario (IRE) 1922 | Gainsborough; 1915 | Rosedrop | Rosaline |
| Sire Solario (IRE) 1922 | Sun Worship; 1912 | Sundridge | Amphion |
| Sire Solario (IRE) 1922 | Sun Worship; 1912 | Sundridge | Sierra |
| Sire Solario (IRE) 1922 | Sun Worship; 1912 | Doctrine | Ayrshire |
| Sire Solario (IRE) 1922 | Sun Worship; 1912 | Doctrine | Axiom |
| Dam Bridge of Allan (GB) 1928 | Phalaris; 1913 | Polymelus | Cyllene |
| Dam Bridge of Allan (GB) 1928 | Phalaris; 1913 | Polymelus | Maid Marian |
| Dam Bridge of Allan (GB) 1928 | Phalaris; 1913 | Bromus | Sainfoin |
| Dam Bridge of Allan (GB) 1928 | Phalaris; 1913 | Bromus | Cheery* |
| Dam Bridge of Allan (GB) 1928 | Spean Bridge; 1910 | Spearmint | Carbine |
| Dam Bridge of Allan (GB) 1928 | Spean Bridge; 1910 | Spearmint | Maid of the Mint |
| Dam Bridge of Allan (GB) 1928 | Spean Bridge; 1910 | Santa Brigida | St Simon* |
| Dam Bridge of Allan (GB) 1928 | Spean Bridge; 1910 | Santa Brigida | Bridget (Family: 8) |

* Mid-day Sun is inbred 5S x 5D x 4D to the stallion St Simon, meaning that he appears fifth generation (via St Frusquin) on the sire side of his pedigree, and fifth generation (via Cheery) and fourth generation on the dam side of his pedigree.
