= Dick Turpin (horse, foaled 1929) =

Thoroughbred racehorse

Gordon Richards on Dick Turpin after winning 1933 Chester Cup

The racehorse Dick Turpin won the 1933 Chester Cup, ridden by Gordon Richards, trained by Martin Hartigan. Dick Turpin won by a head, 2nd Guiscard, 3rd Mandritsara. He was owned by Hon Robert Fraser Watson, 2nd son of 1st Baron Manton. The starting price was 9 to 1. Gordon Richards wrote about the horse in his autobiography published in 1955.
