= Solario =

Irish-bred Thoroughbred racehorse

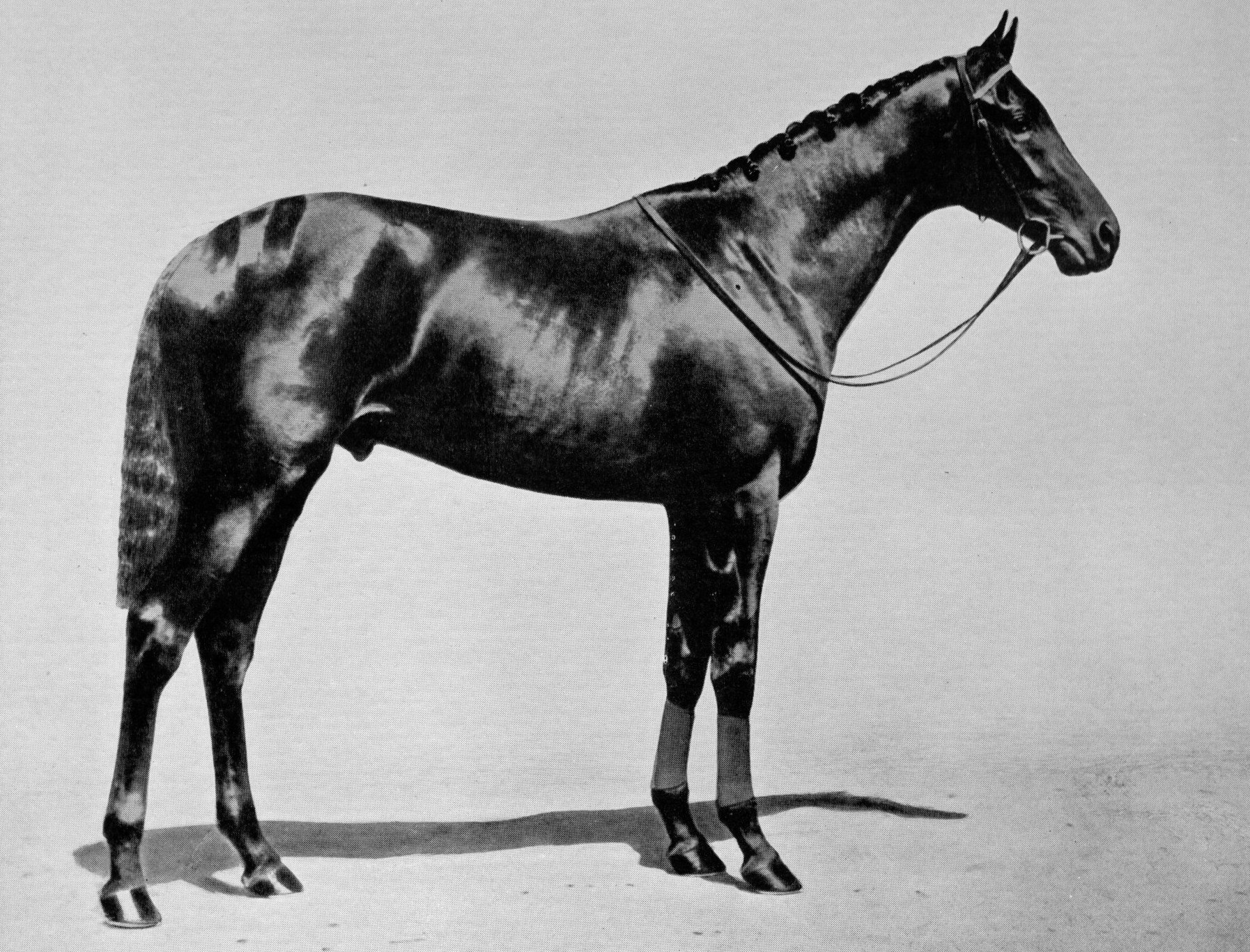
- Sire: Gainsborough
- Grandsire: Bayardo
- Dam: Sun Worship
- Damsire: Sundridge
- Sex: Stallion
- Foaled: 1922
- Died: 1945 (aged 22–23)
- Country: Ireland
- Colour: Bay
- Breeder: 4th Earl of Dunraven
- Owner: Sir John Rutherford
- Trainer: Reginald Day
- Record: 12: 6–1–2
- Earnings: £20,935

Major wins
- Exeter Stakes (1924); Ascot Derby (1925); Princess of Wales's Stakes (1925); St Leger Stakes (1925); Ascot Gold Cup (1926); Coronation Cup (1926)

Awards
- Leading sire in Great Britain & Ireland (1937); Leading broodmare sire in Britain & Ireland (1943, 1949 & 1950)

Honours
- Solario Stakes at Sandown Park Racecourse; LNER Class A1 locomotive no. 4473

Solario (1922–1945) was a successful British Thoroughbred racehorse and influential sire.

== Background ==
Bred in Ireland by the 4th Earl of Dunraven, he was by the 1918 English Triple Crown champion, Gainsborough. His dam Sun Worship, was a daughter of the outstanding sire Sundridge who was the Leading sire in Great Britain & Ireland in 1911.

Solario was sold as a yearling for the huge sum of 47,000 guineas to a British syndicate. Sir John Rutherford employed Reginald Day to condition the colt for racing.

== Racing career ==
At age two, Solario won the 1924 Exeter Stakes and was second to Picaroon in the Middle Park Stakes. As a three-year-old, he finished fourth in the first two British Classic Races then won the third, the St Leger Stakes. At Ascot Racecourse he won the 1925 Ascot Derby. At age four, Solario ran away from the field while winning the 1926 Coronation Cup by fifteen lengths then won the Ascot Gold Cup.

== Stud career ==
Solario commenced stud duties at Newmarket at a fee of 500 guineas a mare. In 1932 he was sold following the death of his owner, Sir John Rutherford. In his will, Rutherford left two pictures of Solario and the Coronation Cup he won to the Blackburn Museum and Art Gallery. Solario was sent to stand at Terrace House Stud (now Tattersalls' Park Paddocks in Newmarket, Suffolk). In 1937, he was the Leading sire in Great Britain & Ireland when his son Mid-day Sun won The Derby and his daughter Exhibitionnist won the 1,000 Guineas Stakes and Epsom Oaks. Solario sired his second Epsom Derby winner when another son, Straight Deal, won the 1943 running.

Solario died at the age of 23 in 1945, having sired the winners of £270,000 in stakes. He is buried at Tattersalls' Park Paddocks in Newmarket.

=== Selected notable offspring ===
- Sunny Devon (f. 1928) – won Coronation Stakes, Champion Three-Year-Old Filly in England
- Dastur (f. 1929) – won 1931 Woodcote Stakes, in 1932 won Irish Derby, Ascot Derby Stakes, Sussex Stakes, in 1933 won Coronation Cup, Champion Stakes
- Silversol (f. 1930) – won the: 1936 Irish Oaks
- Tai-Yang (f. 1930) – won 1933 Jockey Club Stakes
- Raeburn (f. 1933) – won the 1936 Irish Derby
- Sind (f. 1933) – Leading sire in Argentina in 1950
- Exhibitionnist (f. 1934) – won 1000 Guineas, Epsom Oaks
- Mid-day Sun (f. 1934) – won Epsom Derby, Hardwicke Stakes, Lingfield Derby Trial
- Solar Flower (f. 1935) – won Coronation Stakes, dam of Solar Slipper
- Sadri II (f. 1936) – won 1941 Durban July Handicap
- Straight Deal (f. 1940) – won 1943 Epsom Derby

Solario was the Leading broodmare sire in Great Britain & Ireland in 1943, 1949 and 1950. Through his daughters, he was the damsire of:

- Escamillo (f. 1939) – winner of the 1943 Grand Prix de Saint-Cloud
- Solar Slipper (f. 1945) – won the 1948 Champion Stakes and 1949 John Porter Stakes
- Cavan (f. 1955) – won the American Classic, the Belmont Stakes
- Indiana (f. 1961) – won St Leger Stakes

== Honours ==
In 1925 the London & North Eastern Railway (LNER) began a tradition of naming locomotives after winning racehorses; LNER Class A1 locomotive no. 4473 (later no. 104, British Railways no. 60104) was named Solario after this horse, and remained in service until December 1959. Sandown Park Racecourse have a hospitality area known as the Solario Suite.

== Sire line tree ==
- Solario
  - Dastur
    - Dhoti
      - Royal Gem
        - Dark Star
        - Precious Stone
        - Royal Bay Gem
    - Gold Nib
    - Umiddad
    - Darbhanga
    - Princes Game
      - Welton Gameful
        - Welton Louis
          - Welton Chit Chat
        - Welton Crackerjack
          - Welton Greylag
          - Welton Houdini
          - Welton Envoy
        - Welton Friday
        - Welton Apollo
          - Market Venture
  - Tai-Yang
  - Raeburn
  - Sind
    - Pierot
  - Mid-day Sun
    - Alonzo
      - Rising Fast
    - Sterope
  - Foroughi
  - Sadri
  - King's Approach
    - Royal Approach
  - Nicolaus
    - Nicolaus Silver
  - Shapoor
    - Battle Burn
      - Boomerang
  - Straight Deal
    - Aldborough
    - Royal Highway
    - Honour Bound
      - Tied Cottage

== Pedigree ==
Pedigree of Solario (IRE), bay stallion, 1922
Sire Gainsborough 1915	Bayardo; 1906	Bay Ronald	Hampton*
Sire Gainsborough 1915	Bayardo; 1906	Bay Ronald	Black Duchess
Sire Gainsborough 1915	Bayardo; 1906	Galicia	Galopin*
Sire Gainsborough 1915	Bayardo; 1906	Galicia	Isoletta
Sire Gainsborough 1915	Rosedrop; 1907	St Frusquin	St Simon*
Sire Gainsborough 1915	Rosedrop; 1907	St Frusquin	Isabel
Sire Gainsborough 1915	Rosedrop; 1907	Rosaline	Trenton (NZ)
Sire Gainsborough 1915	Rosedrop; 1907	Rosaline	Rosalys
Dam Sun Worship 1912	Sundridge; 1898	Amphion	Rosebery
Dam Sun Worship 1912	Sundridge; 1898	Amphion	Suicide
Dam Sun Worship 1912	Sundridge; 1898	Sierra	Springfield
Dam Sun Worship 1912	Sundridge; 1898	Sierra	Sanda
Dam Sun Worship 1912	Doctrine; 1899	Ayrshire	Hampton*
Dam Sun Worship 1912	Doctrine; 1899	Ayrshire	Atalanta*
Dam Sun Worship 1912	Doctrine; 1899	Axiom	Peter
Dam Sun Worship 1912	Doctrine; 1899	Axiom	Electric Light (Family No. 26)

* Solario is inbred 4S x 5S x 5D to the stallion Galopin, meaning that he appears fourth generation and fifth generation (via St Simon) on the sire side of his pedigree, and fifth generation (via Atalanta) on the dam side of his pedigree.

* Solario is inbred 4S x 4D to the stallion Hampton, meaning that he appears fourth generation on the sire side of his pedigree, and fourth generation on the dam side of his pedigree.
