= Walter Griggs =

English jockey

Personal information
- Born: 13 October 1888 Gillingham, Kent, England
- Died: 19 March 1933 (aged 44) Newmarket, Suffolk, England
- Occupation: Jockey

Horse racing career
- Sport: Horse racing

Major racing wins
- British Classic Races: St Leger Stakes (1908, 1914); Oaks Stakes (1915); Other major races: Middle Park Stakes (1915); St. James's Palace Stakes (1908); Coronation Cup (1909); Eclipse Stakes (1908); Goodwood Cup (1911)

Significant horses
- Argos, Black Jester, Dean Swift, Kilbroney, Snow Marten, Your Majesty
- Updated on 22 October 2023

Walter Griggs (13 October 1888 - 19 March 1933) was a three-time Classic-winning jockey. In 1999, he was ranked the 26th greatest jockey of the 20th Century by the Racing Post.

== Career ==
Walter Griggs was born on 13 October 1888 in Gillingham, Kent to a butcher and small-time bookmaker from Canterbury. At the age of 13, both he and his elder brother William were apprenticed to Newmarket trainer Robert Sherwood. His first winner was Gamaliel in an apprentice race at Gatwick on 20 May 1905.

Walter was the more successful of the two Griggs brothers, though both were popular jockeys during the first quarter of the century. He became first jockey to Jack Joel, and had early success on Joel's colt Your Majesty winning the St James's Palace Stakes, Eclipse Stakes, St. George's Stakes at Liverpool and the St Leger Stakes of 1908, although the crowd are reported to have booed the Eclipse win as it was so unexpected.

The following year he won the Coronation Cup on Dean Swift. Later in the year, he was involved in a frightening incident at the start of the Nottingham Handicap. His horse Shuletoi reared and fought Otto Madden's horse Bushranger "like wild animals". Shuletoi tore Madden from his saddle. Griggs leapt off and escaped without injury. Neither jockey had let go of the bridle, and the horses were eventually pulled apart.

He was nearly fatally injured at Royal Ascot in 1914. In the Hardwicke Stakes, his horse Maiden Erlegh crashed into the rails and "threw him out of his saddle with great violence".

Later in 1914, he won a second St Leger on Black Jester and then won a third Classic in the war-time Oaks on Snow Marten. He was also the jockey for My Prince, a moderately successful flat horse, but sire of four Grand National winners.

During the war, he enlisted as a private in the Royal Navy Air Service, relinquishing about £2,000 a year in riding fees in order to do so. Later, he was given a commission.

He retired from race-riding after the war because of trouble with his weight and instead, started training from Exeter House in Newmarket. He had a share in most of the 30 or so horses in his stable. He was known for being able to get horses fit for the early part of the season. He took his two nephews, Fred and Bill Rickaby on as apprentices. He became their guardian after they lost their father as babies during the war.

However, he did not have a long training career. On 18 March 1933, around 9pm he was taken ill, and suffered a fatal heart attack the following day, aged 44. His funeral was held at St Agnes's Church, Newmarket with fellow jockeys Joe Childs, Fred Lane and Harry Wragg among those in attendance. He left an estate of £12,537.

== Reputation ==
He was known as honest and hard-working at work and genial and amusing out of work. He enjoyed parties and a week before his death had been celebrating at the annual Polo Dance in Newmarket.

== Personal life ==
He married Florence Rickaby, eldest daughter of Fred Rickaby, Sr. on 17 December 1913 at St Agnes' Church in Newmarket. Her brother Fred, another jockey, died in the war. After Griggs' death, Florence remarried jockey Fred Lane just before Christmas 1933.

Walter enjoyed both ice and roller-skating.

== Major wins ==
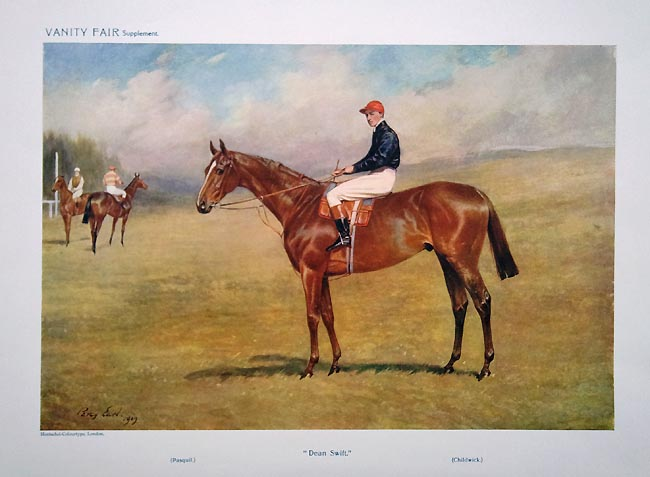
Walter Griggs aboard Dean Swift (from Vanity Fair magazine)

(United Kingdom) Great Britain

- Middle Park Stakes - Argos (1915)
- St Leger Stakes - (2) - Your Majesty (1908), Black Jester (1914)
- St. James's Palace Stakes - Your Majesty (1908)
- Coronation Cup - Dean Swift (1909)
- Eclipse Stakes - Your Majesty (1908)
- Goodwood Cup - Kilbroney (1911)
- Oaks Stakes - Snow Marten (1915)

== See also ==
- List of jockeys

== Bibliography ==
- Mortimer, Roger; Onslow, Richard; Willett, Peter (1978). Biographical Encyclopaedia of British Racing. London: Macdonald and Jane's. ISBN 0-354-08536-0.
