= Jest (horse) =

British-bred Thoroughbred racehorse

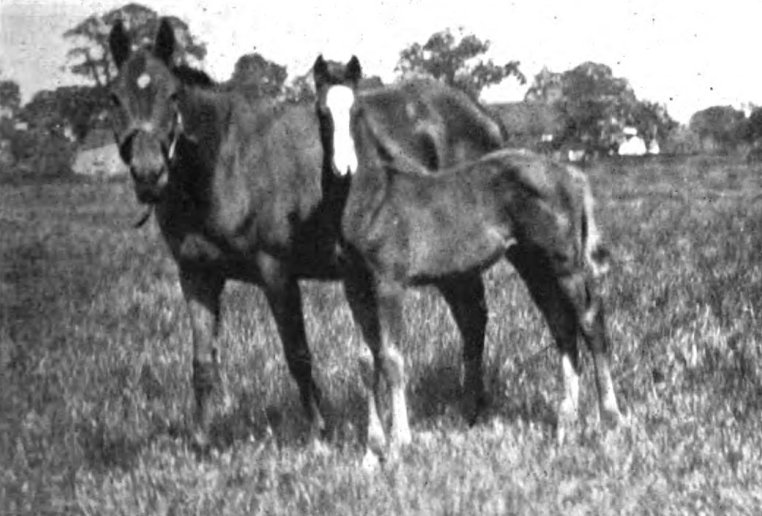
- Jest with her foal Humorist in 1918
- Sire: Sundridge
- Grandsire: Amphion
- Dam: Absurdity
- Damsire: Melton
- Sex: Mare
- Foaled: 1910
- Died: 1921 (aged 10–11)
- Country: United Kingdom
- Colour: Chestnut
- Breeder: Jack Barnato Joel
- Owner: Jack Barnato Joel
- Trainer: Charles Morton
- Record: 8: 4–2–2

Major wins
- Bretby Stakes (1912); Free Handicap (1912); 1000 Guineas (1913); Epsom Oaks (1913)

Jest (1910–1921) was a British Thoroughbred racehorse and broodmare, best known for winning two Classics in 1913. The filly won four times from eight races in a track career which lasted from July 1912 until July 1913. As a two-year-old in 1912 she won twice from four starts. On her three-year-old debut she won the 1000 Guineas over one mile at Newmarket and then won the Oaks over one and a half miles at Epsom a month later. She was retired from racing after being beaten in the Coronation Stakes at Royal Ascot and the Nassau Stakes at Goodwood. As a broodmare she produced the 1921 Epsom Derby winner Humorist before dying at the age of eleven.

== Background ==
Jest was a small chestnut mare with a white star bred by her owner Jack Barnato Joel, the South African mining magnate and three-time British flat racing Champion Owner. Joel sent his filly to his private trainer Charles Morton at Letcombe Bassett in Berkshire. Jest proved to be an extremely temperamental and difficult filly, giving Morton a great deal of trouble.

Jest was sired by the sprinter Sundridge who won three editions of the July Cup before embarking on a successful stud career. Apart from Jest he sired The Derby winner Sunstar and the leading American runner Sun Briar, and was the British Champion sire in 1911. Jest's dam was Absurdity, one of the foundation mares of Joel's Childwick Bury stud: in addition to Jest she produced seven other winners including Black Jester (St Leger Stakes) and Absurd (Middle Park Stakes, champion sire in New Zealand). Her later descendants included the classic winners Royal Palace, Fairy Footsteps (1000 Guineas) and Light Cavalry (St Leger).

== Racing career ==
=== 1912: two-year-old season ===
Jest began her racing career at Hurst Park in July, when she finished third to Prue and Light Brigade (a colt) in the Hurst Park Foal Plate. After a break of two months she returned in September for the Autumn Breeders' Foal Plate at Manchester. She finished second by a neck to Waiontha, who was regarded as the year's best two-year-old filly. At Newmarket in October she recorded her first success when winning the Bretby Stakes by three lengths from Streamlet. Later that month she defeated a field which included the subsequent Derby winner Aboyeur when winning the Free Handicap at Newmarket.

=== 1913: three-year-old season ===
In attempt to curb the filly's temperament, Morton sent Jest to Joel's stud farm to be covered by a stallion, but the experiment was not a success. Before racing in public, she finished third to her stable companions Radiant and Sun Yat in a private trial race. On her official three-year-old debut, she started at odds of 9/1 in a field of twenty-two for the 1000 Guineas over Newmarket's Rowley Mile. Ridden by Fred Rickaby, she won the race by a head and half a length from Taslett and Prue. The result was only confirmed after the racecourse stewards overruled an objection lodged by the rider of the runner up, who claimed that he had been bumped by the winner. Danny Maher, riding Prue, raced on the opposite side of the wide course from the first two fillies and believed he had won.

Jest was then moved up in distance for the Oaks a month later, when she ran in front of a crowd which included King George V. With Rickaby again in the saddle, she started at 8/1 against eleven opponents. She won comfortably by two lengths from Depeche, with Arda half a length away in third. The winning time of 2:37.6 was a record for the race and was identical to that recorded by Craganour and Aboyeur in the controversial "Suffragette Derby" two days earlier.

Jest's two classic wins meant that she had to carry weight penalties her two remaining races. At Royal Ascot she was brought back in distance for the one mile Coronation Stakes and finished third to Prue and Sands of Time, fillies to whom she was conceding fourteen pounds. A month later she was sent to Goodwood for the ten furlong Nassau Stakes. She finished second, beaten less than a length by Arda, carrying twelve pounds more than the winner, in what was described as an unsatisfactory race. Jest was then retired from racing: she had never been entered for the St Leger and was therefore unable to attempt the Fillies' Triple Crown.

== Assessment and honours ==
In their book, A Century of Champions, based on the Timeform rating system, John Randall and Tony Morris rated Jest an "average" winner of the 1000 Guineas and an "inferior" winner of the Oaks.

Jack Joel regarded Jest as the best filly he ever bred.

== Stud record ==
Jest was retired to become a broodmare at her owner's Childwick Bury stud. She failed to produce a foal until 1918 when she gave birth to a chestnut colt by Polymelus. Named Humorist, he won the 1921 Epsom Derby before dying of tuberculosis a month later. Jest produced two other foals, the more notable being Chief Ruler, an unraced colt who was twice champion sire in New Zealand. Jest died in foaling in 1921.

== Pedigree ==
Pedigree of Jest (GB), chestnut mare, 1910
Sire Sundridge (GB) 1898	Amphion; 1886	Rosebery	Speculum
Sire Sundridge (GB) 1898	Amphion; 1886	Rosebery	Ladylike
Sire Sundridge (GB) 1898	Amphion; 1886	Suicide	Hermit
Sire Sundridge (GB) 1898	Amphion; 1886	Suicide	The Ratcatcher's Daughter
Sire Sundridge (GB) 1898	Sierra; 1889	Springfield	St Albans
Sire Sundridge (GB) 1898	Sierra; 1889	Springfield	Viridis
Sire Sundridge (GB) 1898	Sierra; 1889	Sanda	Wenlock
Sire Sundridge (GB) 1898	Sierra; 1889	Sanda	Sandal
Dam Absurdity (GB) 1903	Melton; 1882	Master Kildare	Lord Ronald
Dam Absurdity (GB) 1903	Melton; 1882	Master Kildare	Silk
Dam Absurdity (GB) 1903	Melton; 1882	Violet Melrose	Scottish Chief
Dam Absurdity (GB) 1903	Melton; 1882	Violet Melrose	Violet
Dam Absurdity (GB) 1903	Paradoxical; 1891	Timothy	Hermit
Dam Absurdity (GB) 1903	Paradoxical; 1891	Timothy	Lady Masham
Dam Absurdity (GB) 1903	Paradoxical; 1891	Inchbonny	Sterling
Dam Absurdity (GB) 1903	Paradoxical; 1891	Inchbonny	Casuistry (Family No. 1-s)

- Jest was inbred 4×4 to Hermit, meaning that this stallion appears twice in the fourth generation of her pedigree.
