= Our Lassie =

British-bred Thoroughbred racehorse

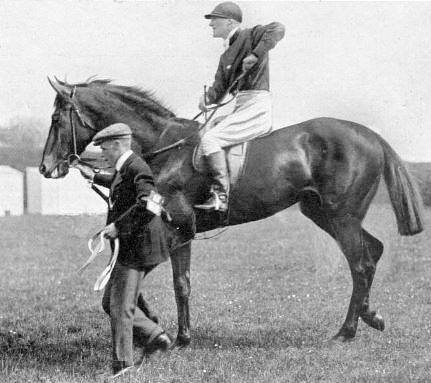
- Our Lassie in 1903 with Morny Cannon.
- Sire: Ayrshire
- Grandsire: Hampton
- Dam: Yours
- Damsire: Melton
- Sex: Mare
- Foaled: 1900
- Country: United Kingdom
- Colour: Bay
- Breeder: Jack Barnato Joel
- Owner: Jack Barnato Joel
- Trainer: Charles Morton
- Record: 10: 2-2-1

Major wins
- Sandown Produce Stakes (1902); Oaks Stakes (1903)

Our Lassie (1900–1916) was a British Thoroughbred racehorse and broodmare. She was a very good performer as a juvenile in 1902 when she won the Sandown Produce Stakes and was placed in her other three starts. In the following year she failed in the Lincoln Handicap but the recorded a decisive win in the Oaks Stakes. She failed to win or place in four subsequent races and was retired from racing at the end of 1904. As a broodmare she produced a few winners but had her biggest impact on the future of Thoroughbred racing through her unraced daughter Lady Brilliant.

== Background ==
Our Lassie was a bay mare bred in England by Jack Barnato Joel who also owned her during her racing career. She was trained by Joel's private trainer Charles Morton at Wantage in Berkshire.

She was one of the best horses sired by Ayrshire who won the 2000 Guineas and Epsom Derby in 1888 and the Eclipse Stakes in 1889. Our Lassie's dam, Yours failed to win a race herself but produced several other winners including Your Majesty. Yours was a granddaughter of the influential British broodmare Grand Duchess.

== Racing career ==
=== 1902: two-year-old season ===
Our Lassie made an early start to her racing career in the £2,000 Sandown Park Produce Stakes over five furlongs on 24 April and won from the colts Rabelais and Arabi. In her three other races she finished second to Arabi in the Great Foal Plate at Lingfield Park, third to Fairman and Countermark in the Great Lancashire Breeders' Produce Stakes at Liverpool and second to Skyscraper in the Prince of Wales's Plate at York Racecourse in August.

=== 1903: three-year-old season ===
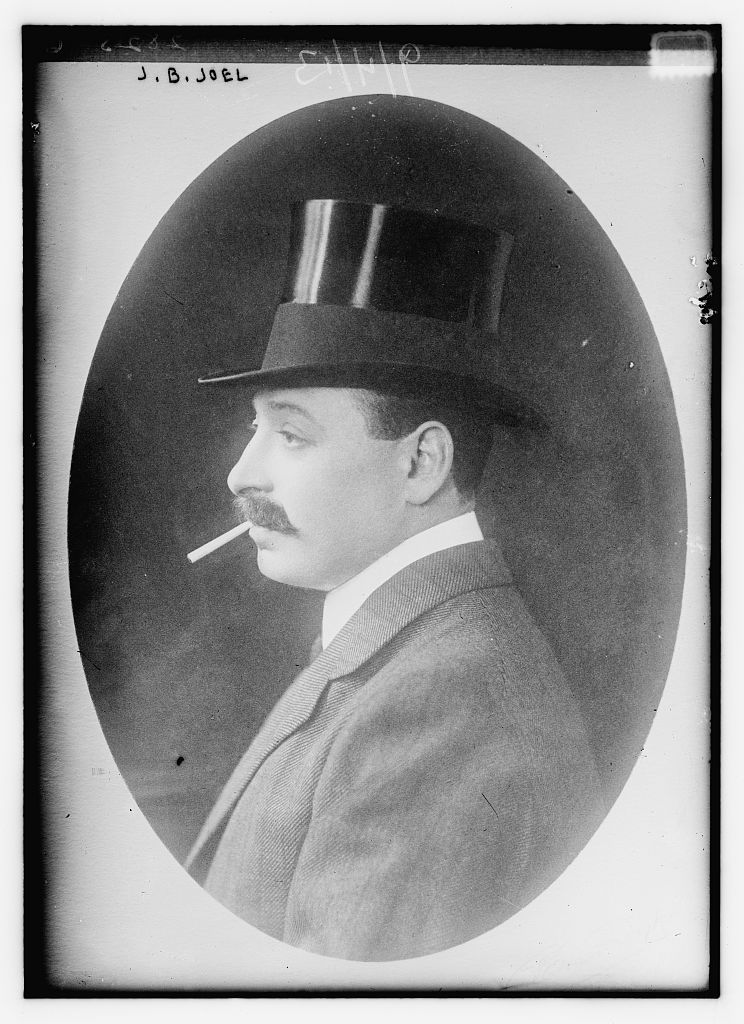
Jack Joel, Our Lassie's owner and breeder

In an unusual seasonal debut for a classic contender, Our Lassie was matched against older horses in the Lincoln Handicap over one mile on 27 March. Although the filly had been "off her food" for a few days before the race, Joel decided to run her as she was set to carry only 84 pounds and had already been backed to win £100,000 from the bookmakers. In the event she ran poorly and finished unplaced behind the easy winner Over Norton.

For her next race Our Lassie was moved up in distance for the 125th running of the Oaks Stakes over 1 1/2 miles at Epsom Racecourse on 29 May. Hammerkop (July Stakes) started favourite ahead of Sun Rose, who had appeared to be an unlucky loser in the 1000 Guineas, with Our Lassie, ridden by Mornington Cannon, next in the betting on 6/1 in a ten-runner field which also included Valve, Dazzling and Skyscraper (who had won the Cheveley Park Stakes since beating Our Lassie at York). The race was a rough one, with Dazzling being brought down after a collision with Sun Rose at Tattenham Corner, at which point the 33/1 outsider Ladies Mile led from Hammerkop with Our Lassie in third. Hammerkop went to the front in the straight but Our Lassie gained the advantage a quarter of a mile from the finish and drew away to win "easily" by three lengths from Hammerkop, with Skyscraper a head away in third place. Jack Joel reportedly won £10,000 by backing his filly in a double bet with the Epsom Derby winner Rock Sand.

A week after her Epsom victory, Our Lassie started 13/8 favourite under a weight of 106 pound for the Manchester Cup over 1 1/2 miles but finished fourth of the eleven runners behind the colt Zinfandel.

In September at Doncaster Racecourse Our Lassie was matched against the 1000 Guineas winner Quintessence in the Park Hill Stakes over 14 1/2 furlongs. Although she started the 7/4 favourite, she never looked likely to win and finished towards the rear of the six-runner field behind Quintessence. At Newmarket Racecourse in October she finished sixth to Sceptre in the Duke of York's Stakes.

=== 1904: four-year-old season ===
Our Lassie remained in training as a four-year-old. On her first and only appearance of the season she started a 66/1 outsider for the Royal Hunt Cup at Royal Ascot in June and finished unplaced behind Csardas. She was retired from racing at the end of the year.

== Assessment and honours ==
In their book, A Century of Champions, based on the Timeform rating system, John Randall and Tony Morris rated Our Lassie an "inferior" winner of the Oaks.

== Breeding record ==
At the end of her racing career, Our Lassie became a broodmare for Joel's stud. She produced at least eight foals between 1906 and 1914:

- Sweet Lassie, a bay filly, foaled in 1906, sired by Orme
- Fair Lassie, bay filly, 1907, by Orme
- Yetman, bay colt, 1908, by Persimmon
- Perilla, chestnut filly, 1910, by Polymelus
- Parhelion, chestnut colt, 1911, by Sundridge. Won four races.
- Lady Brilliant, brown mare, 1912, by Sundridge. An exceptionally influential broodmare whose descendants have included Mill Reef, Wollow, Blushing Groom, Goldikova and King Kamehameha.
- Hesperus, colt, 1913, by Sunstar
- Hollister, brown colt, 1914, by Sunstar

Our Lassie died in 1916.

== Pedigree ==
Pedigree of Our Lassie (GB), bay mare, 1900
Sire Ayrshire (GB) 1893	Hampton (GB); 1872	Lord Clifden	Newminster
Sire Ayrshire (GB) 1893	Hampton (GB); 1872	Lord Clifden	The Slave
Sire Ayrshire (GB) 1893	Hampton (GB); 1872	Lady Langden	Kettledrum
Sire Ayrshire (GB) 1893	Hampton (GB); 1872	Lady Langden	Haricot
Sire Ayrshire (GB) 1893	Atalanta (GB); 1878	Galopin	Vedette
Sire Ayrshire (GB) 1893	Atalanta (GB); 1878	Galopin	Flying Duchess
Sire Ayrshire (GB) 1893	Atalanta (GB); 1878	Feronia	Thormanby
Sire Ayrshire (GB) 1893	Atalanta (GB); 1878	Feronia	Woodbine
Dam Yours (ITY) 1894	Melton (GB); 1882	Master Kildare	Lord Ronald
Dam Yours (ITY) 1894	Melton (GB); 1882	Master Kildare	Silk
Dam Yours (ITY) 1894	Melton (GB); 1882	Violet Melrose	Scottish Chief
Dam Yours (ITY) 1894	Melton (GB); 1882	Violet Melrose	Violet
Dam Yours (ITY) 1894	Your Grace (GB); 1886	Galliard	Galopin
Dam Yours (ITY) 1894	Your Grace (GB); 1886	Galliard	Mavis
Dam Yours (ITY) 1894	Your Grace (GB); 1886	Grand Duchess	Lozenge
Dam Yours (ITY) 1894	Your Grace (GB); 1886	Grand Duchess	Young Alice (Family: 22-d)

- Our Lassie was inbred 3 × 4 to Galopin, meaning that this stallion appears in both the third and fourth generations of her pedigree.
