= Princess Dorrie =

British-bred Thoroughbred racehorse

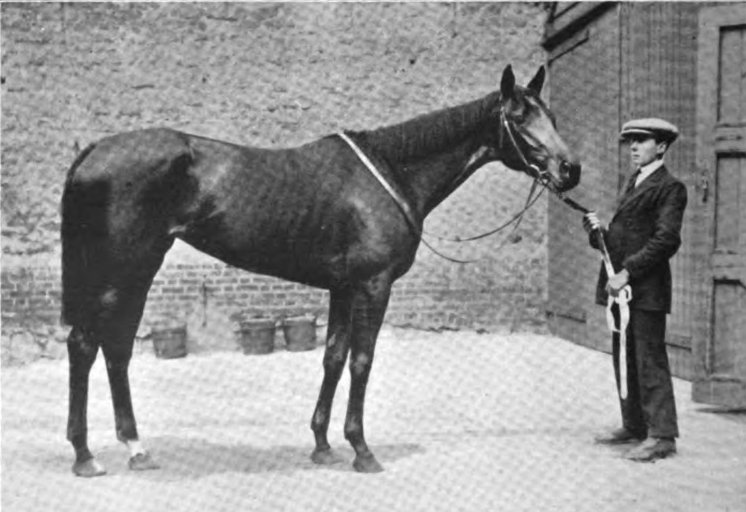
- Sire: Your Majesty
- Grandsire: Persimmon
- Dam: Doris
- Damsire: Loved One
- Sex: Mare
- Foaled: 1911
- Country: United Kingdom
- Colour: Brown
- Breeder: Jack Barnato Joel
- Owner: Jack Barnato Joel
- Trainer: Charles Morton
- Record: 12: 2-5-3

Major wins
- 1000 Guineas (1914); Oaks Stakes (1914)

Princess Dorrie (1911 – 1927) was a British Thoroughbred racehorse and broodmare. As a two-year-old in 1913 she failed to win a race but was very consistent, finishing placed in seven of her eight starts. In the following year she was probably the best three-year-old filly in England, winning both the 1000 Guineas and the Epsom Oaks. She was retired at the end of the 1914 season and had modest success as a broodmare.

== Background ==
Princess Dorrie was a brown mare bred in England by Jack Barnato Joel who also owned her during her racing career. She was trained by Joel's private trainer Charles Morton at Wantage in Berkshire.

She was one of the best horses sired by Joel's stallion Your Majesty who won the Eclipse Stakes and St Leger Stakes in 1908. Her dam Doris showed little ability as a racecourse and was given to Joel by his brother Solomon who commented "I don't think she's much good, you can have her if you like." Doris became an exceptional broodmare who also produced Sunstar, Bright (second in the Oaks Stakes) and the Dewhurst Stakes winner White Star.

== Racing career ==
=== 1913: two-year-old season ===
Princess Dorrie ran eight times as a two-year-old in 1913, and failed to win a race although she was matched against very strong competition. She finished unplaced in the Windsor Castle Stakes at Royal Ascot, second to The Tetrarch in a Rous Memorial Stakes at Goodwood Racecourse, second to Mira in the Acorn Stakes at Epsom, second to Lord Derby's filly Glorvinda in the Mersey Stakes at Liverpool, third in the Prince of Wales Nursery, second to First Spear in the Bretby Stakes at Newmarket Racecourse and third to Vaila in the Moulton Stakes at the same track in October.

=== 1914: three-year-old season ===
Princess Dorrie began her second season by finishing third to the colt My Prince in the Tudor Plate at Sandown Park in April. On 1 of May Princess Dorrie started at odds of 100/9 (11/1) for the 101st running of the 1000 Guineas over the Rowley Mile course at Newmarket. The favourite Torchlight went to the front around half way but Princess Dorrie, ridden by the Australian jockey Bill Huxley, took the lead in the closing stages and won three quarters of a length and a neck from Glorvina (later to win the Queen's Vase) and Torchlight. Georges Stern, who rode the favourite, appeared to ride a poor tactical race: he was criticised for going to the front too early, panicking when challenged by Princess Dorrie, and then easing his filly down to lose second place on the line.

Princess Dorrie was stepped up in distance for the 136th Oaks Stakes over one and a half miles at Epsom Racecourse on 29 of May and with Huxley again in the saddle, started 11/4 favourite ahead of Glorvina and Torchlight in a twenty-one runner field. After looking unlikely to obtain a clear run in the straight she produced a "fine burst of speed" and won comfortably by two lengths from Wassilissa with a gap of four lengths back to Torchlight in third. Wassilissa was ridden by E. Huxley, the brother of the winning jockey. The race was a rather rough one, and the winner returned to the paddock bleeding from cuts to her heel and hock. Some early telegraph reports of the race confused the filly's odds with the weight she had carried and stated that she had won the race under 11-4 (158 pounds). One commentator in New Zealand drily remarked that she "must be a pretty useful mare if she can carry 32lb overweight and then win comfortably".

In October Princess Dorrie was matched against older horses in the Cesarewitch Handicap over two and a quarter miles at Newmarket. She started second favourite but never looked likely to win and finished unplaced behind the outsider Troubador.

== Assessment and honours ==
In their book, A Century of Champions, based on the Timeform rating system, John Randall and Tony Morris rated Princess Dorrie an "inferior" winner of the 1000 Guineas and a "poor" winner of the Oaks.

== Breeding record ==
At the end of her racing career, Princess Dorrie became a broodmare for her owner's stud. She produced at least five foals between 1917 and 1922:

- Queen of Jest, a brown filly, foaled in 1917, sired by Black Jester
- Black Queen, brown filly, 1919, by Black Jester
- Queen of Diamonds, chestnut filly, 1920 Polymelus. Female-line ancestor of Knock Hard and Thirteen of Diamonds (Irish Derby).
- Glorious, chestnut filly, 1921, by Gay Crusader
- Magnus, bay colt, 1922, by The Tetrarch. Winner.

Princess Dorrie died in 1927.

== Pedigree ==
Pedigree of Princess Dorrie (GB), brown mare, 1911
Sire Your Majesty (GB) 1905	Persimmon; 1893	St Simon	Galopin
Sire Your Majesty (GB) 1905	Persimmon; 1893	St Simon	St Angela
Sire Your Majesty (GB) 1905	Persimmon; 1893	Perdita	Hampton
Sire Your Majesty (GB) 1905	Persimmon; 1893	Perdita	Hermione
Sire Your Majesty (GB) 1905	Yours (ITY); 1894	Melton (GB)	Master Kildare
Sire Your Majesty (GB) 1905	Yours (ITY); 1894	Melton (GB)	Violet Melrose
Sire Your Majesty (GB) 1905	Yours (ITY); 1894	Your Grace (GB)	Galliard
Sire Your Majesty (GB) 1905	Yours (ITY); 1894	Your Grace (GB)	Grand Duchess
Dam Doris (GB) 1898	Loved One; 1883	See Saw	Buccaneer
Dam Doris (GB) 1898	Loved One; 1883	See Saw	Margery Daw
Dam Doris (GB) 1898	Loved One; 1883	Pilgrimage	The Palmer
Dam Doris (GB) 1898	Loved One; 1883	Pilgrimage	Lady Audley
Dam Doris (GB) 1898	Lauretta; 1883	Petrarch	Lord Clifden
Dam Doris (GB) 1898	Lauretta; 1883	Petrarch	Laura
Dam Doris (GB) 1898	Lauretta; 1883	Ambuscade	Camerino
Dam Doris (GB) 1898	Lauretta; 1883	Ambuscade	Crossfire (Family: 5-i)
