= Snow Marten =

Irish-bred Thoroughbred racehorse

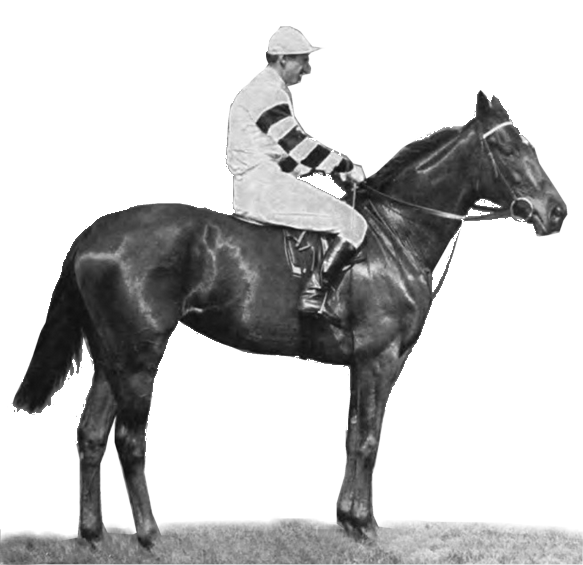
- Snow Marten with jockey Wal Griggs in 1915.
- Sire: Martagon
- Grandsire: Bend Or
- Dam: Siberia
- Damsire: St Simon
- Sex: Mare
- Foaled: 1912
- Country: Ireland
- Colour: Bay
- Breeder: Ludwig Neumann
- Owner: Ludwig Neumann
- Trainer: Peter Gilpin
- Record: 11: 2-4-2

Major wins
- Oaks Stakes (1915)

Snow Marten (1912 – 1928) was a British thoroughbred racehorse and broodmare. She showed promise as a two-year-old in 1914 when she won once and finished second three times from six starts. In the following year she finished unplaced in the 1000 Guineas but then recorded an upset win in the Oaks Stakes. She was placed in wartime substitute races for the Ascot Gold Cup and the St Leger and ended her racing career by finishing third in the Cesarewitch. As a broodmare, she had her biggest influence through her daughter Martha Snow who was exported to the United States.

== Background ==
Snow Marten was a bay mare bred in Ireland by Ludwig Neumann, who also owned her during her racing career. The horse was trained by Peter Gilpin at his Clarehaven Stable in Newmarket, Suffolk.

She was sired by Martagon, a stayer whose biggest wins came in the Goodwood Cup and Queen's Vase before going on to sire the St Leger winner Wool Winder. Her dam Siberia was a top-class racemare who won the Nassau Stakes, Yorkshire Oaks, Park Hill Stakes and Jockey Club Stakes. Siberia was a daughter of Sirenia, whose other female-line descendants have included Comrade, Jeune, Electra (1000 Guineas) and Salmon-Trout (St Leger).

Snow Marten was not an easy filly to train and could be stubborn. One writer commented "though Snow Marten may be a useful filly on her day, she cannot be regarded an altogether reliable performer. Some days she goes, well at home, and on other occasions nothing will induce her to go out of a canter."

Snow Marten's racing career took place during World War I. Many racecourses were closed for the duration of the conflict and all five of traditional British Classic Races were run at Newmarket.

== Racing career ==
=== 1914: two-year-old season ===
Snow Marten ran six times as a two-year-old. On 30 May she finished second to Verveine in the Redfern Plate at Kempton Park Racecourse. At Goodwood Racecourse on 30 July Snow Marten was matched against male opposition in the Prince of Wales's Stakes over six furlongs and finished second, beaten a head by the King's colt Friar Marcus. At Newmarket Racecourse in September the filly recorded her only win of the season when she took the Two-Year-Old Plate. In October at the same track she started joint-favourite for the Imperial Produce Stakes but came home last of the four runners behind the colt Pommern. On her final run of the year, again at Newmarket, she finished second to Contino in the Houghton Stakes.

=== 1915: three-year-old season ===
On 30 April Snow Marten was one of fifteen fillies to contest the 1000 Guineas over one mile at Newmarket but finished unplaced in a race which saw Vaucluse win from Silver Tag and Bright. The 137th running of the Oaks Stakes was expected to take place on 4 June but was rescheduled owing to wartime conditions and was run at Newmarket on 17 June. Ridden by Walter Griggs Snow Marten started a 20/1 outsider in an eleven-runner field, with Vaucluse heading the betting from Silver Tag, Bright and Flash. Snow Marten won the race "in a canter" by four lengths from Bright, with Silver Tag a head away in third. Few of the crowd had profited from the result and the filly returned to the winner's enclosure in near silence.

Snow Marten made her next appearance in late July in the two-mile Newmarket Gold Cup, a substitute for the Ascot Gold Cup. She started second favourite behind Black Jester and finished third behind the colts Apothecary and Carancho.

On 15 September the filly was matched against Pommern (who had won the 2000 Guineas and the Derby Stakes) in the September Stakes, a wartime substitute St Leger. She showed signs of temperament before the race, swishing her tail "ominously" on the way to the start. She proved no match for Pommern, being beaten two lengths into second place, but finished six lengths clear of the other five runners, which included Apothecary and Let Fly (runner-up in the Derby). On her final racecourse appearance Snow Marten contested the Cesarewitch Handicap over two and a quarter miles at Newmarket on 13 October and finished third of the thirty-one runners behind Son-in-Law and Eau Claire.

Snow Marten's earnings enabled Ludwig Neumann to become British flat racing Champion Owner in 1915.

== Assessment and honours ==
In their book, A Century of Champions, based on the Timeform rating system, John Randall and Tony Morris rated Snow Marten an "inferior" winner of the Oaks.

== Breeding record ==
A few days after her Oaks win, Snow Marten was covered by the stallion Sir Martin and her first foal, a bay filly, was delivered on 4 May 1916. Named Martha Snow, she was exported to the United States where she produced Nimba (Alabama Stakes, CCA Oaks), Calumet Dick (Narragansett Special) and White Favor, the female-line ancestor of Curlin.

Snow Marten's other foals included:

- Glen Eagle, bay gelding, 1917, by Jaeger. Winner in steeplechase races.
- Royal Ermine, grey filly, 1918, by Roi Herode. Granddam of Pretender (Prix Gladiateur, Queen Alexandra Stakes)
- Odessa, chestnut filly, 1919, by Sunder
- Miniver, chestnut colt, 1920, by Sunder
- Kalindi, chestnut filly, 1921, by Sunstar. Won Ham Produce Stakes in 1924.

Snow Marten was bred to Caligula and exported to France in 1923. She was not bred in 1927 and died in 1928.

== Pedigree ==
Pedigree of Snow Marten (IRE), bay mare, 1912
Sire Martagon (GB) 1887	Bend Or; 1877	Doncaster	Stockwell
Sire Martagon (GB) 1887	Bend Or; 1877	Doncaster	Marigold
Sire Martagon (GB) 1887	Bend Or; 1877	Rouge Rose	Thormanby
Sire Martagon (GB) 1887	Bend Or; 1877	Rouge Rose	Ellen Horne
Sire Martagon (GB) 1887	Tiger Lily; 1875	Macaroni	Sweetmeat
Sire Martagon (GB) 1887	Tiger Lily; 1875	Macaroni	Jocose
Sire Martagon (GB) 1887	Tiger Lily; 1875	Polly Agnes	The Cure
Sire Martagon (GB) 1887	Tiger Lily; 1875	Polly Agnes	Miss Agnes
Dam Siberia (GB) 1905	St Simon; 1881	Galopin	Vedette
Dam Siberia (GB) 1905	St Simon; 1881	Galopin	Flying Duchess
Dam Siberia (GB) 1905	St Simon; 1881	St Angela	King Tom
Dam Siberia (GB) 1905	St Simon; 1881	St Angela	Adeline
Dam Siberia (GB) 1905	Sirenia; 1895	Gallinule	Isonomy
Dam Siberia (GB) 1905	Sirenia; 1895	Gallinule	Moorhen
Dam Siberia (GB) 1905	Sirenia; 1895	Concussion	Reverberation
Dam Siberia (GB) 1905	Sirenia; 1895	Concussion	Astwith (Family: 19-c)
