= Henry Toulmin =

Henry Toulmin may refer to:

- Harry Toulmin (Unitarian minister) (1766–1823), Unitarian minister and politician
- Henry Hayman Toulmin (1807–1871), British ship owner

== See also ==
- Harry Toulmin (disambiguation)
