= Humorist (horse) =

British Thoroughbred racehorse

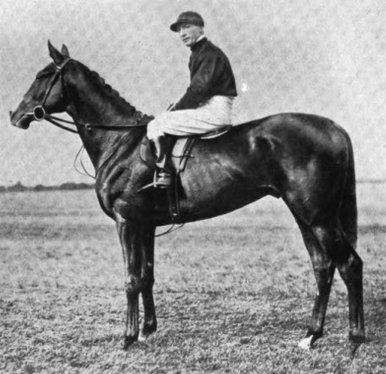
- Humorist in 1921.
- Sire: Polymelus
- Grandsire: Cyllene
- Dam: Jest
- Damsire: Sundridge
- Sex: Stallion
- Foaled: 1918
- Country: United Kingdom of Great Britain and Ireland
- Colour: Chestnut
- Breeder: Jack Barnato Joel
- Owner: Jack Barnato Joel
- Trainer: Charles Morton
- Record: 7: 4-2-1

Major wins
- Woodcote Stakes (1920); Epsom Derby (1921)

Humorist (1918–1921) was a British Thoroughbred racehorse. He was a leading two-year-old in 1920 and finished third in the 1921 2000 Guineas before winning the Derby at Epsom. Less than three weeks after the Derby, Humorist died in his stable from a lung haemorrhage caused by a tubercular condition.

== Background ==
Humorist was a "beautiful, rather delicate" chestnut colt with a broad white blaze and a “kind and intelligent” temperament. He was bred by his owner Jack Joel, who sent him to his private trainer Charles Morton at Letcombe Bassett in Berkshire.

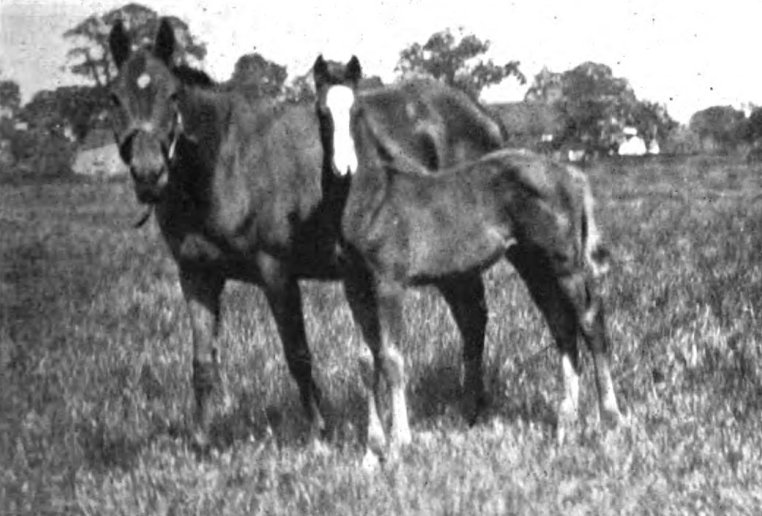
Humorist as a foal in 1918 with his dam, Jest.

Humorist's sire, Polymelus, was a good racehorse who won the Champion Stakes in 1906, but went on to much greater success as a stallion. Apart from Humorist, he sired the Derby winners Pommern and Fifinella and through his son Phalaris is the direct male-line ancestor of most modern thoroughbreds. Humorist's dam, Jest was a highly successful racemare, winning the 1000 Guineas and the Oaks in 1913, and was a half sister of the St Leger winner Black Jester.

Throughout his time in training, Humorist puzzled his connections with his performances, both at home and on the racecourse. He would switch from traveling easily to struggling in a matter of strides. Charles Morton was to say that “all the time I felt there was something wrong with him... he would be perfectly well one day and listless the next." Only after the colt's death were the reasons for this tendency revealed.

== Racing career ==
=== 1920: two-year-old season ===
Humorist was among the best two-year-olds of his generation, winning three time and finishing second twice in five starts. He made his debut in the Woodcote Stakes at Epsom in June, winning by a neck after looking set for an easy victory. He then suffered a bout of coughing and missed his intended target at Royal Ascot.

He returned in the Champagne Stakes at Doncaster in which he was beaten a neck by Lemonora. Humorist then won impressively in the Buckenham Stakes and the Clearwell Stakes before being sent to Newmarket for the Middle Park Stakes. He produced a creditable effort to finish second, beaten a neck by Monarch.

=== 1921: three-year-old season ===
As a three-year-old Humorist was sent straight for the Classic 2000 Guineas without a trial race and started favourite in a field of twenty-six. He led the race into the closing stages and looked the likely winner, but tired abruptly and finished third behind Craig an Eran and Lemonora. The colt's courage was called into question but Donoghue insisted that there was a physical explanation. Morton changed the horse's training regime, working him very lightly in the lead up to the Derby.

Humorist started at 6/1 second favourite at Epsom, with Craig an Eran starting 5/1 favourite. Humorist tracked the leaders before being sent by Donoghue through a gap on the rails and into the lead two furlongs from the finish and held off the sustained challenge of Craig an Eran in a "battle royal" to win by a neck. Humorist appeared distressed and unsteady after the race and had to spend the night in the racecourse stables before he was well enough to return to Letcombe Bassett.

Humorist was being prepared for a run at Royal Ascot but after bleeding from his nostrils it was decided to rest the horse. In late June Humorist was painted by the artist Alfred Munnings. Hours later he was found dead in his stable, in "a pool of blood". An autopsy revealed that the colt had been suffering from chronic tuberculosis, which would have affected him for many months before his death. Contrary to popular mythos, the colt had two lungs. However, the disease severely hampered his lungs' ability to function properly as they filled with blood.

Donoghue paid tribute to the colt:

He gave me everything he had when it must have been agony for him. No horse ever showed greater courage.

Humorist was buried at Joel's Childwick Bury Stud, near St Albans.

== Assessment ==
In their book A Century of Champions, John Randall and Tony Morris rated Humorist as the best British colt of his generation and at #150 in their list of British-trained horses of the 20th Century .

== Pedigree ==
Pedigree of Humorist (GB), chestnut stallion, 1918
Sire Polymelus (GB) 1902	Cyllene; 1895	Bona Vista	Bend Or
Sire Polymelus (GB) 1902	Cyllene; 1895	Bona Vista	Vista
Sire Polymelus (GB) 1902	Cyllene; 1895	Arcadia	Isonomy
Sire Polymelus (GB) 1902	Cyllene; 1895	Arcadia	Distant Shore
Sire Polymelus (GB) 1902	Maid Marian; 1886	Hampton	Lord Clifden
Sire Polymelus (GB) 1902	Maid Marian; 1886	Hampton	Lady Langden
Sire Polymelus (GB) 1902	Maid Marian; 1886	Quiver	Toxophilite
Sire Polymelus (GB) 1902	Maid Marian; 1886	Quiver	Young Melbourne mare
Dam Jest (GB) 1910	Sundridge; 1898	Amphion	Rosebery
Dam Jest (GB) 1910	Sundridge; 1898	Amphion	Suicide
Dam Jest (GB) 1910	Sundridge; 1898	Sierra	Springfield
Dam Jest (GB) 1910	Sundridge; 1898	Sierra	Sanda
Dam Jest (GB) 1910	Absurdity; 1903	Melton	Master Kildare
Dam Jest (GB) 1910	Absurdity; 1903	Melton	Violet Melrose
Dam Jest (GB) 1910	Absurdity; 1903	Paradoxical	Timothy
Dam Jest (GB) 1910	Absurdity; 1903	Paradoxical	Inchbonny (Family: 1)
