= Electra (horse) =

British-bred Thoroughbred racehorse

- Sire: Eager
- Grandsire: Enthusiast
- Dam: Sirenia
- Damsire: Gallinule
- Sex: Mare
- Foaled: 1906
- Country: United Kingdom
- Colour: Bay or brown
- Breeder: Ludwig Neumann
- Owner: Ludwig Neumann
- Trainer: Peter Gilpin
- Record: 16: 6-7-0

Major wins
- 1000 Guineas (1909); Park Hill Stakes (1909)

Electra (1906 – 1918) was a British Thoroughbred racehorse and broodmare. As a two-year-old she showed considerable promise as she won four times from eight starts and finished second on three occasions. In the following year she won the 1000 Guineas and the Park Hill Stakes as well as finishing second in the Newmarket Stakes, Coronation Stakes and Free Handicap. She appeared to be most unlucky when running unplaced in the Epsom Oaks. She failed to win as a four-year-old and was retired from racing but later became a very successful broodmare.

== Background ==
Electra was a bay mare with a white blaze and white socks on her hind legs bred and owned by Ludwig Neumann. Throughout her racing career she was trained by Peter Gilpin at his Clarehaven Stable in Newmarket, Suffolk.

Electra's sire Eager was an exceptional sprinter whose wins included the July Cup and the King's Stand Stakes before retiring to stud where his other offspring included Jaeger (runner-up in the Epsom Derby) and Meleager (Wokingham Stakes). Her dam Sirenia was a speedy filly who won the National Breeders' Produce Stakes in 1897. Her other foals included Cellini (National Breeders' Produce Stakes), Siberia, the dam of Snow Marten, and Sourabaya, the dam of Comrade.

== Racing career ==
=== 1908: two-year-old season ===
Electra ran eight times as a juvenile in 1908 and won four races. She won the Sandown Park Produce Stakes, the Spring Stakes at Newmarket Racecourse, the Acorn Stakes at Epsom and the Breeders' Foal Plate at Kempton Park. In her other races she finished second in a Rous Memorial Stakes at Goodwood, the Great Lancashire Breeders' Produce Stakes at Liverpool, and the Autumn Breeders' Foal Plate at Manchester.

=== 1909: three-year-old season ===
On 30 of April, Electra contested the 96th running of the 1000 Guineas over the Rowley Mile. King Edward VII's filly Princesse de Galles started favourite ahead of Perola, Vivid and Messaouda with Electra starting the 9/1 fifth choice in the betting. Ridden by the Irish jockey Bernard Dillon she won by a length from Princesse de Galles with four lengths back to Perola in third.

On 12 May Electra was matched against male opposition in the ten furlong Newmarket Stakes and finished second to the colt Louviers. Electra was stepped up in distance again and started 5/4 favourite for the Epsom Oaks over 1 1/2 miles on 29 May but finished unplaced behind Perola. She lost her chance at the start as she whipped round and was facing in the wrong direction when the tapes went up. At Royal Ascot in June she started favourite for the one-mile Coronation Stakes but was beaten a neck by Princesse de Galles.

Electra and Princesse de Galles met again in the Park Hill Stakes over 14 1/2 furlongs at Doncaster Racecourse in September. With Dillon again in the saddle Electra started at odds of 13/8 and defeated her rival, to whom she was conceding four pounds in weight, by 1 1/2 lengths. On her final start of the season, she was sent to Newmarket in October for the Free Handicap, in which she was beaten a neck by the Derby winner Minoru.

Electra ended the season with earnings of £5,140.

=== 1910: four-year-old season ===
Electra made at least two appearances as a four-year-old in 1910. In June at Royal Ascot she contested the Royal Hunt Cup but ran unplaced behind Bachelor's Double. At Manchester in September she started favourite for the Prince Edward Handicap over ten furlongs and finished second behind the colt Buckwheat.

== Assessment and honours ==
In their book, A Century of Champions, based on the Timeform rating system, John Randall and Tony Morris rated Electra an "inferior" winner of the 1000 Guineas.

== Breeding record ==
After her retirement from racing Electra became a broodmare for her owner's stud. She produced at least five foals between 1912 and 1917:

- Elkington, a bay colt, foaled in 1912, sired by Symington. Runner-up in the July Stakes.
- Salamandra, bay filly, 1913, by St Frusquin. Second in the Oaks, third in the 1000 Guineas. Dam of Salmon-Trout and the female-line ancestor of Jeune and Pipalong.
- Elsdon, bay colt (later gelded), 1914, by Symington. Won Adelaide Cup
- Rienzi, bay colt, 1915, by Roi Herode
- Orpheus, brown colt, 1917, by Orby. Won the Champion Stakes.

Electra died in 1918.

== Pedigree ==
Pedigree of Electra (GB), bay mare, 1906
Sire Eager (GB) 1894	Enthusiast (GB); 1872	Sterling	Oxford
Sire Eager (GB) 1894	Enthusiast (GB); 1872	Sterling	Whisper
Sire Eager (GB) 1894	Enthusiast (GB); 1872	Cherry Duchess	The Duke
Sire Eager (GB) 1894	Enthusiast (GB); 1872	Cherry Duchess	Mirella
Sire Eager (GB) 1894	Greeba (GB); 1890	Melton	Master Kildare
Sire Eager (GB) 1894	Greeba (GB); 1890	Melton	Violet Melrose
Sire Eager (GB) 1894	Greeba (GB); 1890	Sunrise	Springfield
Sire Eager (GB) 1894	Greeba (GB); 1890	Sunrise	Sunray
Dam Sirenia (GB) 1895	Gallinule (GB); 1884	Isonomy	Sterling
Dam Sirenia (GB) 1895	Gallinule (GB); 1884	Isonomy	Isola Bella
Dam Sirenia (GB) 1895	Gallinule (GB); 1884	Moorhen	Hermit
Dam Sirenia (GB) 1895	Gallinule (GB); 1884	Moorhen	Skirmisher mare
Dam Sirenia (GB) 1895	Concussion (GB); 1885	Reverberation	Thunderbolt
Dam Sirenia (GB) 1895	Concussion (GB); 1885	Reverberation	The Golden Horn
Dam Sirenia (GB) 1895	Concussion (GB); 1885	Astwith	Wenlock
Dam Sirenia (GB) 1895	Concussion (GB); 1885	Astwith	Skirmisher mare (Family 19-c)

- Electra was inbred 3 × 4 to Sterling, meaning that this stallion appears in both the third and fourth generations of her pedigree. She was also inbred 4 × 4 to the Skirmisher mare.
