= Egyptian (1825 ship) =

UK merchant ship (1825–1843)

History

United Kingdom
- Name: Egyptian
- Owner: 1825: John Fenwick, North Shields & William Lilburn, South Shields; 1834: John Fenwick, North Shields; 1841: Henry Hayman Toulmin, London
- Builder: Thomas Metcalf & Son, South Shields
- Launched: 1825
- Completed: 22 August 1825
- Fate: Wrecked 20 October 1843

General characteristics
- Tons burthen: 359 (bm)
- Length: 101 ft 4 in (30.9 m)
- Beam: 28 ft 0 in (8.5 m)

Egyptian was launched in 1825 at Shields. She began trading to India in 1827 under a licence from the British East India Company (EIC). In 1830 and 1831, she brought immigrants to the Swan River Colony. In 1839 and 1840, she transported convicts from England or Ireland to Tasmania. She was wrecked on 20 October 1843, while sailing from England to Sierra Leone.

== Career ==
Egyptian first appeared in Lloyd's Register (LR), in 1826.

Year	Master	Owner	Trade	Source
1826	W.Selburn	J.Fenwick	Liverpool	LR
1827	W.Litburn	J.Fenwick	Liverpool–Bombay	LR

In 1813 the EIC had lost its monopoly on the trade between India and Britain. British ships were then free to sail to India or the Indian Ocean under a licence from the EIC.

Captain W.Litburn sailed for Bombay on 18 February 1827. She arrived there on 24 June. She sailed on 16 August, from Bombay and 6 November, from St Helena. She arrived back at London on 18 December.

Year	Master	Owner	Trade	Source
1830	W. Lilburn	J.Fenwick	London	LR

On 3 September 1829, Captain Lilburn sailed for the Swan River Colony with migrants. Egyptian arrived in Gage's Road in February 1830, having come via Cape Town, where she had arrived on 4 December. She had 69 passengers on board.

On 21 August 1831, Captain Lilburn again sailed for the Swan River Colony. Egyptian arrived there on 28 December. She arrived back at London in October 1832. In January 1833, she again sailed for Bombay.

Year	Master	Owner	Trade	Source & notes
1834	Butcher	Fenwick	London	LR; homeport of Newcastle
1836	Redman; N.R.Sayers	Fenwick	London; London–New York	LR; damages repaired 1836

On 19 December 1836, Egyptian, one of the Union Line of packets, Sayers, master, arrived in London after a passage of 24 days. She carried a cargo of silk, ivory, cochineal, indigo, woo, spice, drugs, etc., valued at some £50,000. It was one of the richest cargoes from New York in some years.

Year	Master	Owner	Trade	Source & notes
1838	Sayers; Duncan	Fenwick	London–New York; Clyde–Honduras	LR; damages repaired 1836 & small repair 1838
1841	Duncan; J.Skelton	Fenwick; Toulminn	London–Sydney	LR; damages repaired 1836 & small repair 1838

1st convict voyage to Tasmania (1839): Captain John Skelton sailed from Sheerness on 9 April 1839. Egyptian arrived at Hobart on 24 August. She had embarked 190 male convicts and she landed 189. The 51st Regiment of Foot provided the guard.

On 20 October 1839, Egyptian, Skelton, master, sailed from Hobart Town to Ceylon. She arrived at Trincomalee on 26 December. On 31 March 1840, she sailed for London. On 5 June, she arrived at Deal.

2nd convict voyage to Tasmania (1840): Captain Skelton arrived at Kingstown, Dublin on 3 August 1840. Egyptian sailed from Dublin on 19 August, and arrived at Hobart on 12 December. She arrived with 170 convicts, possibly the same number she had embarked.

Egyptian sailed from Hobart on 13 January 1841, and arrived at Ceylon on 3 March. She sailed from there 2 May, bound for London. She was at St Helena on 2 July, and arrived back at London on 26 September.

In 1841/42 Henry Hayman Toulmin purchased Egyptian and re-registered her in London.

Year	Master	Owner	Trade	Source & notes
1842	J.Skelton	Toulmin	London	LR; part fir plank wales, topsides, and deck, and small repairs 1841.
1843	J.Skelton; Walmsley	Toulminn	London; London–Ceylon	LR; part fir plank wales, topsides, and deck, and small repairs 1841.

Actually, on 4 September 1843, Egyptian, Walmsley, master, sailed from Gravesend, Kent for Sierra Leone.

== Fate ==
Egyptian was wrecked 20 October 1843, on the Red Bank, off the coast of the Gambia Colony and Protectorate. She was on a voyage from Gravesend to Sierra Leone.
