= Black Jester =

British-bred Thoroughbred racehorse

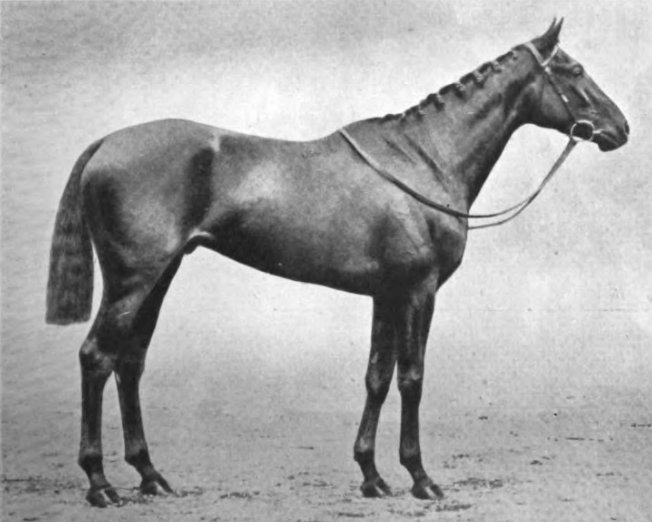
- Sire: Polymelus
- Grandsire: Cyllene
- Dam: Absurdity
- Damsire: Melton
- Sex: Stallion
- Foaled: 1911
- Country: United Kingdom
- Colour: Brown
- Breeder: Jack Barnato Joel
- Owner: Jack Barnato Joel
- Trainer: Charles Morton
- Record: 23: 9–6–1
- Earnings: £15,000

Major wins
- Molecomb Stakes (1913); Richmond Stakes (1913); Sussex Stakes (1914); St Leger Stakes (1914); City and Suburban Handicap (1915); June Stakes (1915)

Black Jester (1911–1928) was a British Thoroughbred racehorse and sire, best known for winning the Classic St Leger Stakes in 1914. The colt won nine times from twenty-three races in a track career which lasted from 1913 until October 1915. Black Jester was one of the leading two-year-olds of 1913 when he won both Molecomb Stakes and the Richmond Stakes at Goodwood. As a three-year-old he finished third in the 2000 Guineas and was unplaced in The Derby before winning the Sussex Stakes at Goodwood and the St Leger at Doncaster in September. In 1915 he won the City and Suburban Handicap and the June Stakes, a wartime substitute for the Coronation Cup. He became increasingly difficult to train and at the end of the season he was retired to stud where he became a successful sire of broodmares.

== Background ==
Black Jester was a brown colt bred by his owner Jack Barnato Joel, the South African mining magnate and three-time British flat racing Champion Owner. Joel sent his colt to his private trainer Charles Morton at Letcombe Bassett in Berkshire. He proved to be a temperamental and difficult colt, and could not be relied upon to produce his best form. Black Jester was described as "not a very big colt", but "very truly made" and "a sparkling mover".

Black Jester was sired by Polymelus, who won the Champion Stakes in 1906, and went on to much greater success as a stallion. Apart from Black Jester, he sired the Derby winners Pommern, Humorist and Fifinella and through his son Phalaris is the direct male-line ancestor of most modern Thoroughbreds. He was the Leading sire in Great Britain and Ireland on five occasions. Black Jester's dam was Absurdity, one of the foundation mares of Joel's Childwick Bury stud: in addition to Black Jester she produced seven other winners including Jest (Epsom Oaks) and Absurd (Middle Park Stakes, champion sire in New Zealand). Her later descendants included the classic winners Royal Palace, Fairy Footsteps (1000 Guineas) and Light Cavalry (St Leger).

== Racing career ==
=== 1913: two-year-old season ===
In 1913, Black Jester ran eight times and recorded two victories, both of them at Goodwood in July. He won the six furlong Richmond Stakes at odds of 10/11 and the Molecomb Stakes over five furlongs at 1/4. In both races he was ridden by the Australian Frank Wootton who had been British flat racing Champion Jockey for the previous four years, despite being still in his teens. In the Richmond he won by two lengths from Land of Song, who was carrying seven pounds more than the winner. In September he ran behind By George! in the Champagne Stakes at Doncaster and in October he was unplaced behind Corcyra in the Middle Park Stakes. Despite his successes at Goodwood, Black Jester was regarded as far inferior to the year's leading two-year-old The Tetrarch. He was however, regarded as one of the most promising British colts of his generation, and with The Tetrarch being considered unlikely to contest the classics, he was identified as a contender for major honours in 1914.

=== 1914: three-year-old season ===
In the 2000 Guineas over Newmarket's Rowley Mile course, Black Jester finished third of the eighteen runners, beaten a short head and two lengths by Kennymore and Corcyra. Shortly afterwards, Black Jester won the St George Stakes at Liverpool to confirm his position as a contender for the Epsom Derby.

At Epsom on 29 May, Black Jester started the 10/1 second favourite for the Derby, which attracted an estimated 400,000 spectators, including the King and Queen. The race was delayed by the behaviour of Kennymore who became extremely agitated and kicked out at other horses before being left twenty lengths behind at the start. Black Jester was among the leaders from the start and was in second place on the turn into the straight. He briefly appeared to take a slight lead but was overtaken by the French-trained outsider Durbar and dropped out of contention in the closing stages to finish seventh of the thirty runners. According to one report the Prince of Wales lost £150 by wagering on Black Jester. After the Derby, Black Jester showed good, but inconsistent form, winning the Ascot Biennial Stakes but then being beaten in the Hardwicke Stakes. For the second year in succession, he was successful at Goodwood in July, winning the one-mile Sussex Stakes at odds of 4/9.

In the St Leger at Doncaster on 9 September he started at odds of 10/1 against seventeen rivals in the largest field for 53 years. The distance of one and three quarter miles was not expected to suit Black Jester, whose stamina had been questioned, and who was therefore not a popular choice with betters. Ridden by Walter Griggs, he tracked Kennymore, who set an extremely strong pace, until taking the lead quarter a mile from the finish. In the closing stages he drew away from his opponents and won by five lengths from Kennymore, with Cressingham three lengths further back in third. His winning time of 3:02.6 was a record and remains the sixth fastest St Leger ever run at Doncaster. Jack Joel admitted that he was surprised at his colt's win, saying that he "never had a shilling on him" after losing heavily when betting on the horse at Epsom. He donated £1,000 from the St Leger prize money to various charities or "Relief Funds".

In his remaining races that year Black Jester finished unplaced under a weight of 124 pounds in the Cambridgeshire Handicap and second to Hapsburg in the ten furlong Champion Stakes at Newmarket.

=== 1915: four-year-old season ===
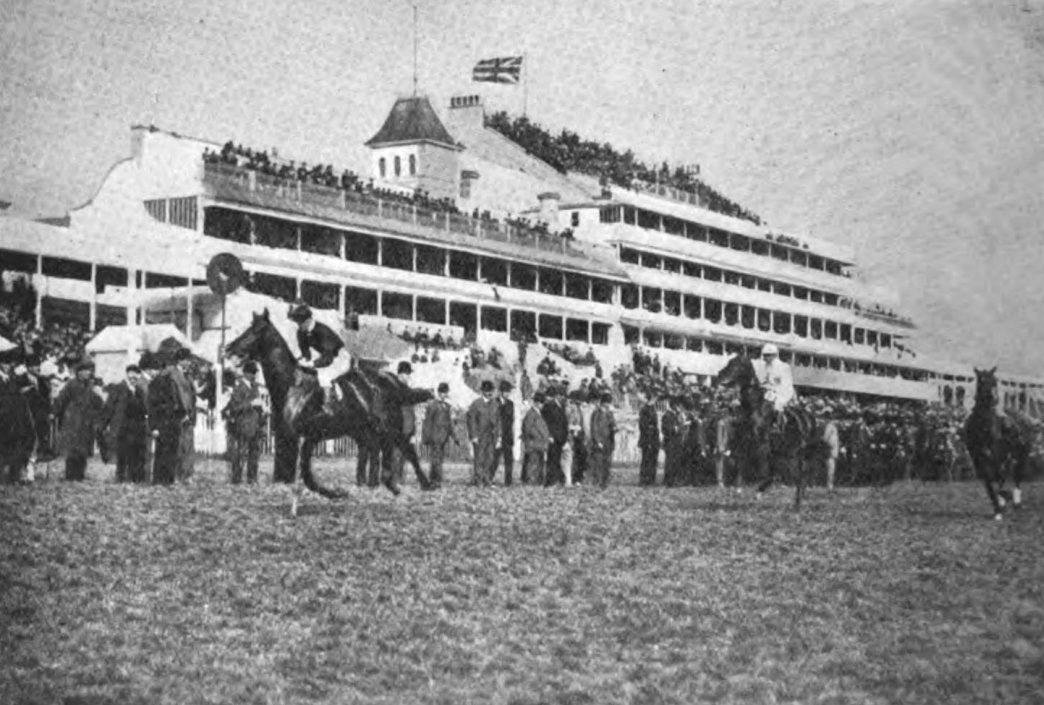
Black Jester wins the City and Suburban Handicap in 1915

Black Jester began his four-year-old campaign in the nine and a half furlong City and Suburban Handicap at Epsom on 21 April. Ridden by W. Huxley, he won from Diadumenos and Dan Russel. His success saw him described as "the best handicap horse in England at the present time". By June, wartime restrictions saw Epsom Racecourse closed and the Derby meeting of 1915 was moved to the July Course at Newmarket. At the meeting Black Jester carried 134 pounds to victory in the June Stakes, which was a replacement for the Coronation Cup. At the same course a month later, he was beaten by the three-year-old Rossendale in the Princess of Wales's Stakes, when attempting to conceded twenty-one pounds to the younger horse. Black Jester had been confidently expected to win the race and his defeat reportedly caused "quite a senstation".

By the end of the year Black Jester's temperament had become highly unpredictable. On some occasions he would work brilliantly; but on others he could "hardly be persuaded to put one leg before the other". He was retired to stud after finishing unplaced behind Let Fly in the Champion Stakes.

== Assessment and honours ==
In their book, A Century of Champions, based on the Timeform rating system, John Randall and Tony Morris rated Black Jester an "average" winner of the St Leger and the best horse in Britain in 1914.

== Stud record ==
Black Jester was not considered a success as a breeding stallion, but did sire some notable broodmares. His daughter Black Ray was an influential mare, being the direct female ancestor of Mill Reef, Blushing Groom and Wollow. Black Ray's sister Black Gem was the ancestor of the 1000 Guineas and Oaks winner Imprudence. Another of his daughters was Black Domino, the dam of the Grand Prix de Paris winner Barneveldt. According to the Encyclopædia Britannica, Black Jester was exported to Argentina at some point in his stud career. Black Jester died in June 1928.

== Pedigree ==
Pedigree of Black Jester (GB), brown stallion, 1911
Sire Polymelus (GB) 1902	Cyllene; 1895	Bona Vista	Bend Or
Sire Polymelus (GB) 1902	Cyllene; 1895	Bona Vista	Vista
Sire Polymelus (GB) 1902	Cyllene; 1895	Arcadia	Isonomy
Sire Polymelus (GB) 1902	Cyllene; 1895	Arcadia	Distant Shore
Sire Polymelus (GB) 1902	Maid Marian; 1886	Hampton	Lord Clifden
Sire Polymelus (GB) 1902	Maid Marian; 1886	Hampton	Lady Langden
Sire Polymelus (GB) 1902	Maid Marian; 1886	Quiver	Toxophilite
Sire Polymelus (GB) 1902	Maid Marian; 1886	Quiver	Young Melbourne mare
Dam Absurdity (GB) 1903	Melton; 1882	Master Kildare	Lord Ronald
Dam Absurdity (GB) 1903	Melton; 1882	Master Kildare	Silk
Dam Absurdity (GB) 1903	Melton; 1882	Violet Melrose	Scottish Chief
Dam Absurdity (GB) 1903	Melton; 1882	Violet Melrose	Violet
Dam Absurdity (GB) 1903	Paradoxical; 1891	Timothy	Hermit
Dam Absurdity (GB) 1903	Paradoxical; 1891	Timothy	Lady Masham
Dam Absurdity (GB) 1903	Paradoxical; 1891	Inchbonny	Sterling
Dam Absurdity (GB) 1903	Paradoxical; 1891	Inchbonny	Casuistry (Family No. 1-s)
