= Salmon-Trout =

British-bred Thoroughbred racehorse

- Sire: The Tetrarch
- Grandsire: Roi Herode
- Dam: Salamandra
- Damsire: St Frusquin
- Sex: Stallion
- Foaled: 1921
- Country: United Kingdom
- Colour: Bay
- Breeder: Marmaduke Furness, 1st Viscount Furness
- Owner: Aga Khan III
- Trainer: Richard Dawson
- Record: 13: 6-4-1
- Earnings: £15,800

Major wins
- Prendergast Stakes (1923); Dewhurst Stakes (1923); Hastings Stakes (1923); Princess of Wales's Stakes (1924); Great Yorkshire Stakes (1923); St Leger (1924)

Salmon-Trout (also known as Salmon Trout 1921 – after 1938) was a British Thoroughbred racehorse and sire. He showed very promising form as a two-year-old in 1923 when he won both of his races, namely the Prendergast Stakes and Dewhurst Stakes. In the following year he won four of his ten races including the Princess of Wales's Stakes and the St Leger as well as being placed in the Newmarket Stakes and the Champion Stakes. In 1925 he finished second in the Ascot Gold Cup. After his retirement from racing he stood as a breeding stallion in England and South Africa and had some success as a sire of winners.

== Background ==
Salmon-Trout was a big, powerful, good-looking bay horse bred in England by Marmaduke Furness, 1st Viscount Furness. As a yearling the colt was put up for auction at Doncaster and was bought for 3,000 guineas by George Lambton, acting on behalf of Aga Khan III. Salmon-Trout was sent into training with Dick Dawson at Whatcombe, near Lambourn in Berkshire.

He was sired by The Tetrarch an unbeaten horse who was regarded as one of the fastest two-year-old ever seen in Britain and Ireland, but whose career was ended by injury before he could race at three. The Tetrarch showed very little interest in his stud duties: his attitude towards sex was described as being "monastic in the extreme". Although he sired few foals his progeny included several major winners. Salmon-Trout's dam Salamandra was a top-class racemare, finishing third the 1000 Guineas and second in the Oaks Stakes in 1916, and was a daughter of the 1000 Guineas winner Electra. Salamandra was bought by Lord Furness at Newmarket in December 1920 for 16,000 guineas with Salmon-Trout in utero.

== Racing career ==
=== 1923: two-year-old season ===
Salmon-Trout made his first appearance in the five furlong Prendergast Stakes at Newmarket Racecourse on 18 October and "scrambled home" from Windward and St Germans. At the next Newmarket meeting he stepped up in class and distance for the Dewhurst Stakes over seven furlongs on 1 November. Ridden by G Hulme and starting at odds of 4/1, he led from the start and won "very comfortably" from Hurstwood.

At the end of the year Salmon-Trout was rated one of the Aga Khan's most promising juveniles, and in the official Free Handicap he was ranked third behind his stablemates Mumtaz Mahal and Diophon. His two wins earned his owner £2,290.

=== 1924: three-year-old season ===
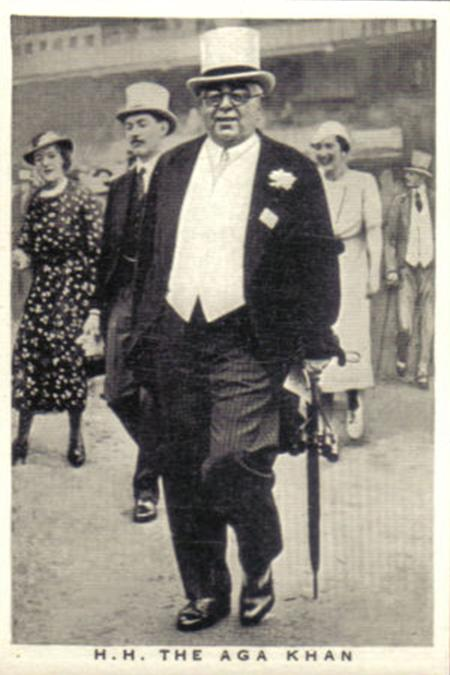
Salmon-Trout's owner Aga Khan III

On his second-season debut, Salmon-Trout finished unplaced behind Green Fire the Greenham Stakes at Newbury Racecourse in April. Salmon-Trout bypassed the 2000 Guineas and instead won the Hastings Plate over ten furlongs at the same meeting. On 21 May the colt contested the Newmarket Stakes (a trial race for the Epsom Derby) over ten furlongs at Newmarket. In a slowly-run race which developed into a sprint in the final furlong, he was beaten a neck by Hurstwood, with Lord Derby's Sansovino a head away in third place and Bright Knight (the Derby favourite before the race) just behind in fourth. The 1924 Derby Stakes was run in exceptionally wet and testing conditions at Epsom Racecourse on 4 June. Salmon-Trout, who was regarded as the Aga Khan's second string behind the 2000 Guineas winner Diophon was never in contention and finished sixth behind Sansovino who won easily from St Germans and Hurstwood.

On his first appearance after his poor run in the Derby, Salmon-Trout contested the Princess of Wales's Stakes over 1 1/2 miles on 3 July at Newmarket in which he was ridden by Vic Smyth and started at odds of 5/1. He won "in a canter" by three lengths and a head from Parmenio and Obliterate. He followed up by winning the Great Yorkshire Stakes over one and three quarter miles at York Racecourse in August. By this point in his career he was being described as a "sound stayer" but requiring careful training on account of his "delicate" legs. At Hurst Park, in his warm-up race for the St Leger, Salmon-Trout was partnered by Vic Smyth in the Richemount Three-Year-Old Stakes but failed to overhaul the improving Watford (ridden by Smyth's brother) and was beaten a head into second place.

In the 149th running of the St Leger over 14 1/2 furlongs at Doncaster Racecourse on 10 September, Salmon-Trout was ridden by the Australian Bernard "Brownie" Carslake and started at odds of 6/1 in a field of seventeen runners. The complexion of the race was affected by an "epidemic of coughing" which ruled out Straitlace, Hurstwood and Bright Knight: Sansovino, St Germans, Polyphontes (Eclipse Stakes) and Salmon-Trout himself were also reportedly affected. Salmon-Trout was restrained at the rear of the field by Carslake and looked to have no chance of winning a furlong out as Santorb challenged the favourite Polyphontes for the lead. He then produced a remarkable turn of speed, took the lead in the closing stages, and crossed the finishing line two lengths clear of Santorb, with Polyphontes half length back in third. Before the race many bookmakers had lengthened their odds against Salmon-Trout on the basis of supposed "inside information" suggesting that the colt could not win, and some sustained heavy losses on the race as a result.

Later that month the colt reappeared in the Kinsclere Plate at Newbury, but was surprisingly beaten by the outsider Depatch. On his final appearance of the season, Salmon-Trout finished third behind the four-year-olds Pharos and Parth in the Champion Stakes over ten furlongs at Newmarket in October.

=== 1925: four-year-old season ===
Salmon-Trout remained in training as a four-year-old in 1925, with the Ascot Gold Cup as his principal objective. In the Gold Cup on 18 June he finished second to Santorb, beaten a length by the winner, with St Germans in third.

== Assessment and honours ==
In their book, A Century of Champions, based on the Timeform rating system, John Randall and Tony Morris rated Salmon-Trout an "average" winner of the St Leger.

== Stud record ==
After his retirement from racing Salmon-Trout became a breeding stallion and stood in England for eleven years before being exported to South Africa in 1937. His last reported foals were born in 1938. The best of his offspring were King Salmon (Coronation Cup, Eclipse Stakes) and Salmon Leap (Coronation Cup, Goodwood Cup).

== Sire line tree ==
- Salmon-Trout
  - Salmon Leap
  - Reel
  - King Salmon
    - Jamaica Inn
    - Royal Chaplain
    - King's Abbey
      - Golden Abbey
    - Treble Crown
    - Kingstone
    - John Moore
    - Manguari
    - Prosper
      - Vandalo
      - Nicho
    - Quasi
    - Ubi
  - Gipsy George
  - Prawn Curry

== Pedigree ==
Pedigree of Salmon-Trout (GB), bay stallion, 1921
Sire The Tetrarch (IRE) 1911	Roi Herode (FR); 1904	Le Samaritain	Le Sancy
Sire The Tetrarch (IRE) 1911	Roi Herode (FR); 1904	Le Samaritain	Clementina (GB)
Sire The Tetrarch (IRE) 1911	Roi Herode (FR); 1904	Roxelane	War Dance
Sire The Tetrarch (IRE) 1911	Roi Herode (FR); 1904	Roxelane	Rose of York (GB)
Sire The Tetrarch (IRE) 1911	Vahren (GB); 1897	Bona Vista	Bend Or
Sire The Tetrarch (IRE) 1911	Vahren (GB); 1897	Bona Vista	Vista
Sire The Tetrarch (IRE) 1911	Vahren (GB); 1897	Castania	Hagioscope
Sire The Tetrarch (IRE) 1911	Vahren (GB); 1897	Castania	Rose Garden
Dam Salamandra (GB) 1913	St Frusquin (GB); 1893	St Simon	Galopin
Dam Salamandra (GB) 1913	St Frusquin (GB); 1893	St Simon	St Angela
Dam Salamandra (GB) 1913	St Frusquin (GB); 1893	Isabel	Plebeian
Dam Salamandra (GB) 1913	St Frusquin (GB); 1893	Isabel	Parma
Dam Salamandra (GB) 1913	Electra (GB); 1906	Eager	Enthusiast
Dam Salamandra (GB) 1913	Electra (GB); 1906	Eager	Greeba
Dam Salamandra (GB) 1913	Electra (GB); 1906	Sirenia	Gallinule
Dam Salamandra (GB) 1913	Electra (GB); 1906	Sirenia	Concussion (Family 19-c)
