= Coronation Cup =

Flat horse race in Britain

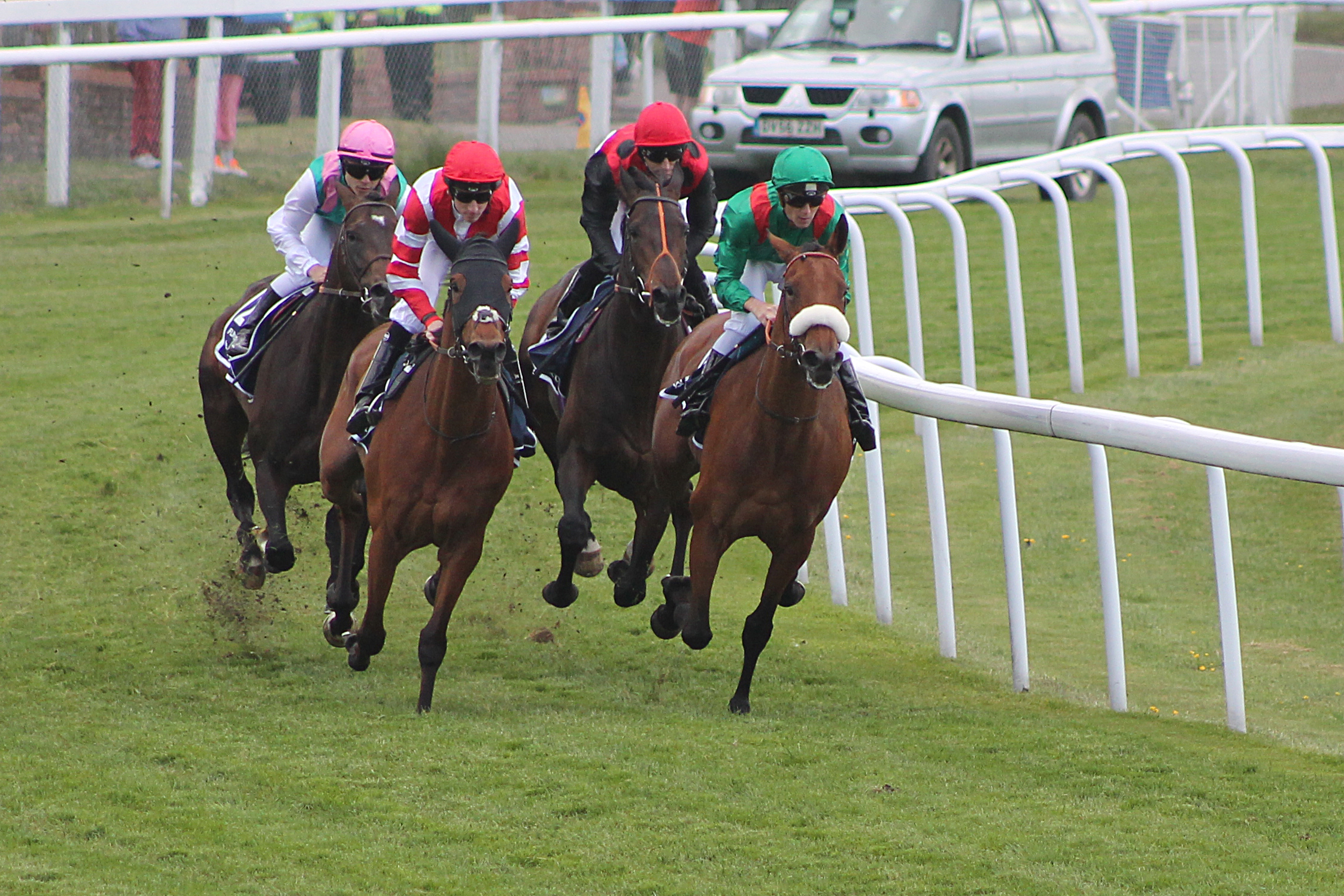
- The field rounding Tattenham Corner in the 2015 running
- Class: Group 1
- Location: Epsom Downs; Epsom, Surrey, England, UK
- Inaugurated: 1902
- Race type: Flat / Thoroughbred
- Sponsor: Betfred
- Website: Epsom Downs

Race information
- Distance: 1m 4f 6y (2,420 m), or about 1½ miles
- Surface: Turf
- Track: Left-handed
- Qualification: Four-years-old and up
- Weight: 9 st 2 lb Allowances; 3 lb for fillies and mares
- Purse: £450,000 (2025); 1st: £255,195

Coronation Cup
2026
Bay City Roller	Jan Brueghel	Lambourn

Previous years
2025
Jan Brueghel	Calandagan	Giavellotto
2024
Luxembourg	Hamish	Feed The Flame
2023
Emily Upjohn	Westover	Point Lonsdale
2022
Hukum	Pyledriver	High Definition
2021
Pyledriver	Al Aasy	Japan

2020-2011
2020
Ghaiyyath	Anthony Van Dyck	Stradivarius
2019
Defoe	Kew Gardens	Salouen
2018
Cracksman	Salouen	Windstoss
2017
Highland Reel	Frontiersman	Hawkbill
2016
Postponed	Found	Roseburg
2015
Pether's Moon	Dolniya	Flintshire
2014
Cirrus des Aigles	Flintshire	Ambivalent
2013
St Nicholas Abbey	Dunaden	Joshua Tree
2012
St Nicholas Abbey	Red Cadeaux	Masked Marvel
2011
St Nicholas Abbey	Midday	Clowance

2010–2001
2010
Fame and Glory	Sariska	High Heeled
2009
Ask	Youmzain	Look Here
2008
Soldier of Fortune	Youmzain	Macarthur
2007
Scorpion	Septimus	Maraahel
2006
Shirocco	Ouija Board	Enforcer
2005
Yeats	Alkaased	Reefscape
2004
Warrsan	Doyen	Vallee Enchantee
2003
Warrsan	Highest	Black Sam Bellamy
2002
Boreal	Storming Home	Zindabad
2001
Mutafaweq	Wellbeing	Millenary

2000–1991
2000
Daliapour	Fantastic Light	Border Arrow
1999
Daylami	Royal Anthem	Dream Well
1998
Silver Patriarch	Swain	Ebadiyla
1997
Singspiel	Dushyantor	Le Destin
1996
Swain	Singspiel	De Quest
1995
Sunshack	Only Royale	Time Star
1994
Apple Tree	Environment Friend	Blush Rambler
1993
Opera House	Environment Friend	Apple Tree
1992
Saddlers' Hall	Rock Hopper	Terimon
1991
In The Groove	Terimon	Rock Hopper

1990–1981
1990
In The Wings	Observation Post	Ibn Bey
1989
Sheriff's Star	Ile De Chypre	Green Adventure
1988
Triptych	Infamy	Moon Madness
1987
Triptych	Rakaposhi King	Acatenango
1986
Saint Estephe	Triptych	Petoski
1985
Rainbow Quest	Old Country	Long Pond
1984
Time Charter	Sun Princess	Lovely Dancer
1983
Be My Native	Electric	Old Country
1982
Easter Sun	Glint of Gold	Critique
1981
Master Willie	Prince Bee	Vielle

1980–1978
1980
Sea Chimes	Niniski	Soleil Noir
1979
Ile de Bourbon	Frere Basile	Gay Mecene
1978
Crow	Balmerino	Smuggler

The Coronation Cup is a Group 1 flat horse race in Great Britain open to horses aged four years or older. It is run at Epsom Downs over a distance of 1 mile, 4 furlongs and 6 yards (2,420 metres), or about 1½ miles, and it is scheduled to take place each year in late May or early June.

== History ==
The event was established in 1902 to commemorate the coronation of a new British monarch, King Edward VII. Epsom had staged a similar race, the Epsom Gold Cup, which was open to horses aged three or older. The Coronation Cup was temporarily switched to alternative venues during wartime periods, with runnings at Newmarket (1915–16, 1943–45) and Newbury (1941).

The race is contested on the first day of Epsom's two-day Derby Festival meeting, the same day as the Epsom Oaks. Its distance is the same as that of both the Oaks and the Epsom Derby, and it often features horses who competed in those events in the preceding seasons.

The race was run on the Thursday of the Derby meeting until 1994, it was run on a Saturday in 1975 (due to the European Community Membership referendum on the Thursday), 1995–97, 2012–16 and finally run on the Friday from 1998–2011 then from 2017-2025, from 2026, the Coronation Cup will return to a Saturday, the same day as the Derby.

== Records ==
Most successful horse (3 wins):

- St Nicholas Abbey – 2011, 2012, 2013

Leading jockey (9 wins):

- Lester Piggott – Zucchero (1953), Nagami (1959), Petite Etoile (1960, 1961), Park Top (1969), Roberto (1973), Quiet Fling (1976), Sea Chimes (1980), Be My Native (1983)

Leading trainer (10 wins):

- Aidan O'Brien – Yeats (2005), Scorpion (2007), Soldier of Fortune (2008), Fame and Glory (2010), St Nicholas Abbey (2011, 2012, 2013), Highland Reel (2017), Luxembourg (2024), Jan Brueghel (2025)

Leading owner (10 wins): (includes part ownership)

- Sue Magnier – Yeats (2005), Scorpion (2007), Soldier of Fortune (2008), Fame and Glory (2010), St Nicholas Abbey (2011, 2012, 2013), Highland Reel (2017), Luxembourg (2024), Jan Brueghel (2025)

== Winners ==
Year	Winner	Age	Jockey	Trainer	Owner	Time
1902	Osboch	4	Danny Maher	Richard Marsh	Lord Wolverton	2:42.20
1903	Valenza	5	Otto Madden	Frederick Day	E Heinemann	
1904	Zinfandel	4	Mornington Cannon	Charles Beatty	Lord Howard de Walden	2:45.40
1905	Pretty Polly	4	Otto Madden	Peter Gilpin	Eustace Loder	
1906	Pretty Polly	5	Bernard Dillon	Peter Gilpin	Eustace Loder	2:36.80
1907	The White Knight	4	William Halsey	Harry Sadler	Tom Kirkwood	2:39.60
1908	The White Knight	5	William Halsey	Harry Sadler	Tom Kirkwood	
1909	Dean Swift	8	Walter Griggs	Charles Morton	Jack Barnato Joel	2:37.40
1910	Sir Martin	4	Skeets Martin	Joseph Cannon	Louis Winans	2:35.00
1911	Lemberg	4	Bernard Dillon	Alec Taylor Jr.	Alfred W. Cox	2:40.00
1912	Stedfast	4	Fred Rickaby	George Lambton	Lord Derby	2:37.20
1913	Prince Palatine	5	W Saxby	Henry Beardsley	Thomas Pilkington	2:40.60
1914	Blue Stone	4	W Huxley	Charles Morton	Jack Barnato Joel	2:36.40
1915	Black Jester	4	W Huxley	Charles Morton	Jack Barnato Joel	2:32.60
1916	Pommern	4	Steve Donoghue	Charles Peck	Solomon Joel	2:37.40
1917	no race					
1918	no race					
1919	He	4	Arthur Smith	Frank Barling	Lord Glanely	2:25.00
1920	Manilardo	4	Joe Childs	Alec Taylor Jr.	Alexander Robb Cox	2:34.80
1921	Silvern	4	Frank O'Neill	Frank Hartigan	Edward Hutton	2:36.80
1922	Franklin	4	Steve Donoghue	Richard Dawson	Lord Carnarvon	2:35.00
1923	Condover	4	Harry Beasley	E Harper	Mrs A Bendir	2:36.60
1924	Verdict	4	Steve Donoghue	William Waugh	Lord Coventry	2:50.00
1925	St Germans	4	Frank Bullock	Alec Taylor Jr.	Lord Astor	2:37.80
1926	Solario	4	Joe Childs	Reginald Day	John Rutherford	2:45.40
1927	Coronach	4	Joe Childs	Fred Darling	Lord Woolavington	2:34.00
1928	Apelle	5	Harry Beasley	Atty Persse	Dermot McCalmont	2:33.00
1929	Reigh Count	4	Joe Childs	Bert S. Michell	Fannie Hertz	2:36.00
1930	Plantago	5	Cyril Ray	Joseph Lawson	Washington Singer	2:39.40
1931	Parenthesis	4	Freddie Fox	Fred Darling	Lord Woolavington	2:36.40
1932	Salmon Leap	5	Tommy Weston	George Lambton	Venetia James	2:43.00
1933	Dastur	4	Charlie Elliott	Frank Butters	Aga Khan III	2:34.60
1934	King Salmon	4	Harry Wragg	Ossie Bell	Richard Brooke	2:34.20
1935	Windsor Lad	4	Charlie Smirke	Marcus Marsh	Martin Benson	2:33.40
1936	Plassy	4	Richard Perryman	Colledge Leader	Lord Derby	2:36.00
1937 (dh)	Cecil; His Grace (Note: The 1937 race was a dead-heat and has joint winners)	6; 4	Tommy Weston; Gordon Richards	Joseph Lawson; Richard Dawson	Abe Bailey; James V. Rank	2:35.40
1938	Monument	5	Rufus Beasley	Cecil Boyd-Rochfort	Duke of Marlborough	2:36.40
1939	Scottish Union	4	Gordon Richards	Noel Cannon	James V. Rank	2.37.00
1940	no race					
1941	Winterhalter	4	Doug Smith	Frank Butters	Aga Khan III	2:41.80
1942	no race					
1943	Hyperides	4	Eph Smith	Jack Jarvis	Lord Rosebery	2:34.20
1944	Persian Gulf	4	Bobby Jones	Cecil Boyd-Rochfort	Zia Wernher	2:25.80
1945	Borealis	4	Harry Wragg	Walter Earl	Lord Derby	2:32.40
1946	Ardan	5	Charlie Elliott	Charles Semblat	Marcel Boussac	2:42.40
1947	Chanteur	5	Roger Brethes	Henry Count	William Hill	2:35.60
1948	Goyama	5	Charlie Elliott	Charles Semblat	Marcel Boussac	2:40.40
1949	Beau Sabreur	4	Billy Cook	Richard Brabazon	A B Macnaughton	2:46.40
1950	Amour Drake	4	Roger Poincelet	Robert Carver	Suzy Volterra	2:38.80
1951	Tantieme	4	Jacques Doyasbère	François Mathet	François Dupré	2:39.80
1952	Nuccio	4	Roger Poincelet	Alec Head	Aga Khan III	2:37.60
1953	Zucchero	5	Lester Piggott	Bill Payne	George Rolls	2:37.40
1954	Aureole	4	Eph Smith	Cecil Boyd-Rochfort	Queen Elizabeth II	2:35.00
1955	Narrator	4	Frank Barlow	Humphrey Cottrill	Lionel Brook Holliday	2:54:00
1956	Tropique	4	Paul Blanc	Geoffroy Watson	Guy de Rothschild	2:37.40
1957	Fric	5	Jean Deforge	Philippe Lallie	Michel Calmann	2:34.80
1958	Ballymoss	4	Scobie Breasley	Vincent O'Brien	John McShain	2:41.60
1959	Nagami	4	Lester Piggott	Harry Wragg	Etti Plesch	2:37.20
1960	Petite Etoile	4	Lester Piggott	Noel Murless	Prince Aly Khan	2:35.20
1961	Petite Etoile	5	Lester Piggott	Noel Murless	HH Aga Khan IV	2:42.40
1962	Dicta Drake	4	Yves Saint-Martin	François Mathet	Suzy Volterra	2:42.00
1963	Exbury	4	Jean Deforge	Geoffroy Watson	Guy de Rothschild	2:38.20
1964	Relko	4	Yves Saint-Martin	François Mathet	François Dupré	2:47.00
1965	Oncidium	4	Scobie Breasley	George Todd	Lord Howard de Walden	2:38.70
1966	I Say	4	Duncan Keith	Walter Nightingall	Louis Freedman	2:36.40
1967	Charlottown	4	Jimmy Lindley	Gordon Smyth	Lady Zia Wernher	2:49.70
1968	Royal Palace	4	Sandy Barclay	Noel Murless	Jim Joel	2:55.50
1969	Park Top	5	Lester Piggott	Bernard van Cutsem	11th Duke of Devonshire	2:37.50
1970	Caliban	4	Sandy Barclay	Noel Murless	Stanhope Joel	2:49.20
1971	Lupe	4	Geoff Lewis	Noel Murless	Gladys Joel	2:37.70
1972	Mill Reef	4	Geoff Lewis	Ian Balding	Paul Mellon	2:34.94
1973	Roberto	4	Lester Piggott	Vincent O'Brien	John W. Galbreath	2:34.50
1974	Buoy	4	Joe Mercer	Dick Hern	Dick Hollingsworth	2:36.50
1975	Bustino	4	Joe Mercer	Dick Hern	Lady Beaverbrook	2:33.31
1976	Quiet Fling	4	Lester Piggott	Jeremy Tree	John Hay Whitney	2:38.10
1977	Exceller	4	Gérard Dubroeucq	François Mathet	Nelson Bunker Hunt	2:36.94
1978	Crow	5	Pat Eddery	Peter Walwyn	Daniel Wildenstein	2:34.30
1979	Ile de Bourbon	4	John Reid	Fulke Johnson Houghton	Sir Philip Oppenheimer	2:43.50
1980	Sea Chimes	4	Lester Piggott	John Dunlop	John Thursby	2:35.89
1981	Master Willie	4	Philip Waldron	Henry Candy	Robert Barnett	2:44.49
1982	Easter Sun	5	Bruce Raymond	Michael Jarvis	Lady Beaverbrook	2:35.05
1983	Be My Native	4	Lester Piggott	Robert Armstrong	K. Hsu	2:45.38
1984	Time Charter	5	Steve Cauthen	Henry Candy	Robert Barnett	2:40.60
1985	Rainbow Quest	4	Pat Eddery	Jeremy Tree	Khalid Abdullah	2:39.51
1986	Saint Estephe	4	Pat Eddery	André Fabre	Yan Houyvet	2:34.87
1987	Triptych	5	Tony Cruz	Patrick Biancone	Alan Clore	2:35.97
1988	Triptych	6	Steve Cauthen	Patrick Biancone	Peter M. Brant	2:34.84
1989	Sheriff's Star	4	Ray Cochrane	Lady Herries	Duchess of Norfolk	2:35.49
1990	In the Wings	4	Cash Asmussen	André Fabre	Sheikh Mohammed	2:36.43
1991	In the Groove	4	Steve Cauthen	David Elsworth	Brian Cooper	2:36.32
1992	Saddlers' Hall	4	Walter Swinburn	Michael Stoute	Lord Weinstock	2:35.73
1993	Opera House	5	Michael Roberts	Michael Stoute	Sheikh Mohammed	2:35.13
1994	Apple Tree	5	Thierry Jarnet	André Fabre	Sultan Al Kabeer	2:35.43
1995	Sunshack	4	Pat Eddery	André Fabre	Khalid Abdullah	2:35.85
1996	Swain	4	Frankie Dettori	André Fabre	Sheikh Mohammed	2:40.27
1997	Singspiel	5	Frankie Dettori	Michael Stoute	Sheikh Mohammed	2:37.72
1998	Silver Patriarch	4	Pat Eddery	John Dunlop	Peter Winfield	2:37.60
1999	Daylami	5	Frankie Dettori	Saeed bin Suroor	Godolphin	2:40.26
2000	Daliapour	4	Kieren Fallon	Sir Michael Stoute	HH Aga Khan IV	2:41.63
2001	Mutafaweq	5	Frankie Dettori	Saeed bin Suroor	Godolphin	2:36.05
2002	Boreal	4	Kieren Fallon	Peter Schiergen	Gestüt Ammerland	2:45.01
2003	Warrsan	5	Philip Robinson	Clive Brittain	Saeed Manana	2:35.68
2004	Warrsan	6	Darryll Holland	Clive Brittain	Saeed Manana	2:35.96
2005	Yeats	4	Kieren Fallon	Aidan O'Brien	Magnier / Nagle	2:36.98
2006	Shirocco	5	Christophe Soumillon	André Fabre	Baron G. von Ullmann	2:37.64
2007	Scorpion	5	Michael Kinane	Aidan O'Brien	Magnier / Tabor	2:40.82
2008	Soldier of Fortune	4	Johnny Murtagh	Aidan O'Brien	Magnier / Tabor / Smith	2:36.83
2009	Ask	6	Ryan Moore	Sir Michael Stoute	Patrick J. Fahey	2:37.00
2010	Fame and Glory	4	Johnny Murtagh	Aidan O'Brien	Smith / Magnier / Tabor	2:33.42
2011	St Nicholas Abbey	4	Ryan Moore	Aidan O'Brien	Smith / Magnier / Tabor	2:37.18
2012	St Nicholas Abbey	5	Joseph O'Brien	Aidan O'Brien	Smith / Magnier / Tabor	2:34.52
2013	St Nicholas Abbey	6	Joseph O'Brien	Aidan O'Brien	Smith / Magnier / Tabor	2:37.76
2014	Cirrus des Aigles	8	Christophe Soumillon	Corine Barande-Barbe	Jean-Claude-Alain Dupouy	2:34.86
2015	Pether's Moon	5	Pat Dobbs	Richard Hannon Jr.	John Manley	2:33.76
2016	Postponed	5	Andrea Atzeni	Roger Varian	Mohammed Obaid Al Maktoum	2:43.54
2017	Highland Reel	5	Ryan Moore	Aidan O'Brien	Smith / Magnier / Tabor	2:33.34
2018	Cracksman	4	Frankie Dettori	John Gosden	Anthony Oppenheimer	2:38.49
2019	Defoe	5	Andrea Atzeni	Roger Varian	Mohammed Obaid Al Maktoum	2:33.94
2020 (Note: The 2020 race was run at Newmarket, due to the COVID-19 pandemic in the United Kingdom)	Ghaiyyath	5	William Buick	Charlie Appleby	Godolphin	2:25.89
2021	Pyledriver	4	Martin Dwyer	William Muir & Chris Grassick	La Pyle Partnership	2:42.23
2022	Hukum	5	Jim Crowley	Owen Burrows	Shadwell Racing	2:36.40
2023	Emily Upjohn	4	Frankie Dettori	John and Thady Gosden	Lloyd Webber, Tactful Finance, S.Roden	2:33.78
2024	Luxembourg	5	Ryan Moore	Aidan O'Brien	Westerberg / Smith / Magnier / Tabor	2:42.12
2025	Jan Brueghel	4	Ryan Moore	Aidan O'Brien	Westerberg / Smith / Magnier / Tabor	2:36.13
2026	Bay City Roller	4	Oisin Murphy	George Scott	Victorious Forever	2:40.08

== See also ==
- Horse racing in Great Britain
- List of British flat horse races
