= Childwickbury Manor =

Manor in Hertfordshire, England

Coordinates: 51°46′44″N 0°20′56″W

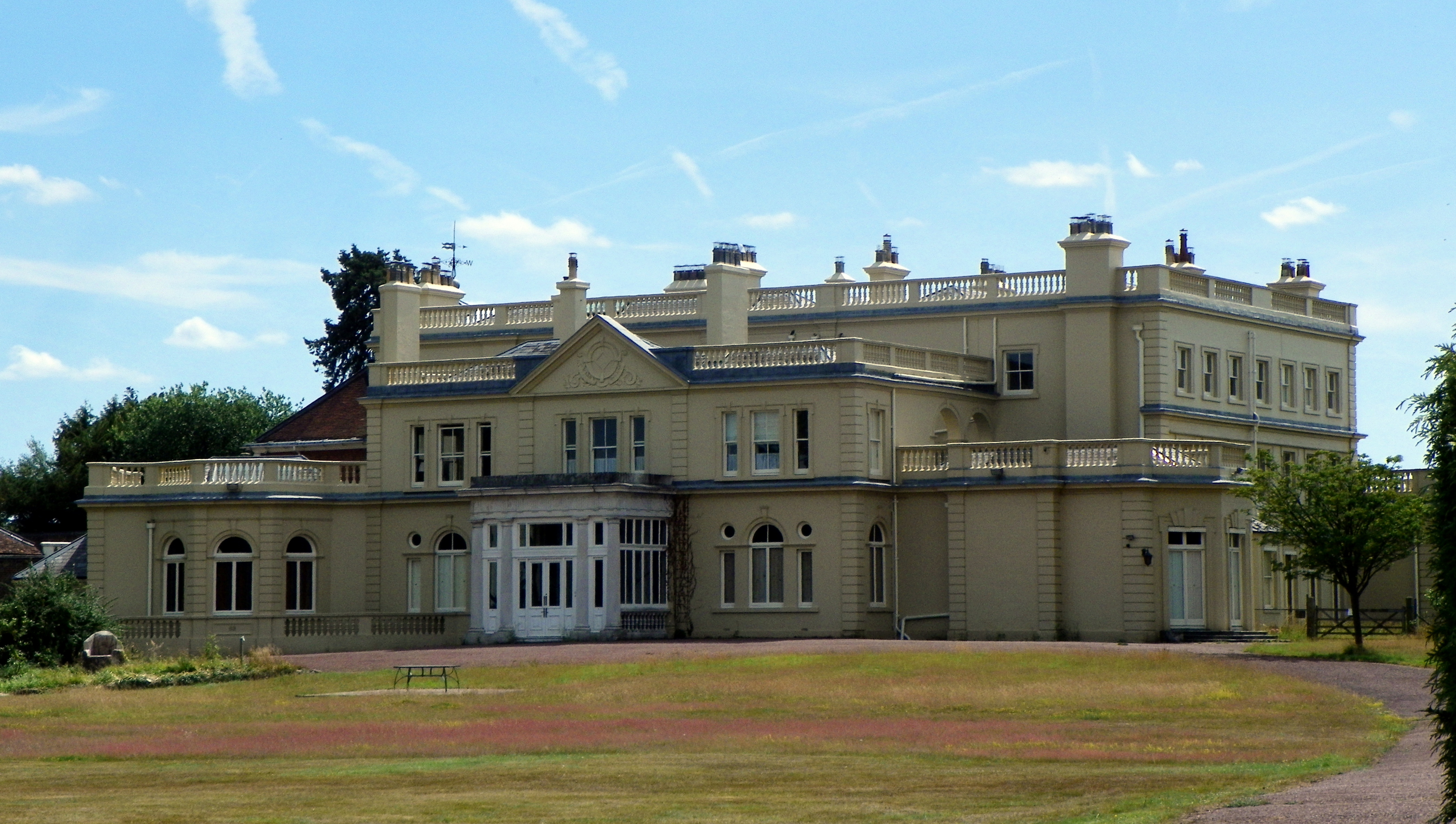
The manor house

Childwickbury Manor is a manor house in the hamlet of Childwickbury, Hertfordshire, England, between St Albans and Harpenden. It was the home and is the resting place of American filmmaker Stanley Kubrick.

== History ==
The Lomax family bought the house in 1666 and lived there until 1854 when Joshua Lomax sold it to Henry Hayman Toulmin, a wealthy ship owner, High Sheriff of Hertfordshire and mayor of St Albans. Toulmin left the property to Sir John Blundell Maple around 20 years later. Toulmin's granddaughter, the author Mary Carbery, was born at the house.

Maple bred and raced thoroughbreds and built Childwickbury Stud into a very successful horse breeding operation. Another prominent racehorse owner, Jack Barnato Joel, bought the estate including the stud farm in 1906. On his death in 1940, his son Jim Joel took over the operation. He too became a successful racehorse owner and breeder and maintained the property until 1978 when the stud and the manor were sold separately. At that time the estate occupied 172 acres (70 ha).

Film director Stanley Kubrick bought the manor in 1978. He used the estate as both a home and a nerve centre for his film productions. He lived there until his death in 1999 and is interred in its grounds together with his eldest daughter Anya Kubrick, who died in 2009. His widow, Christiane Kubrick, niece of German director Veit Harlan, still lives in the Manor House.
