= Your Majesty (horse) =

British-bred Thoroughbred racehorse

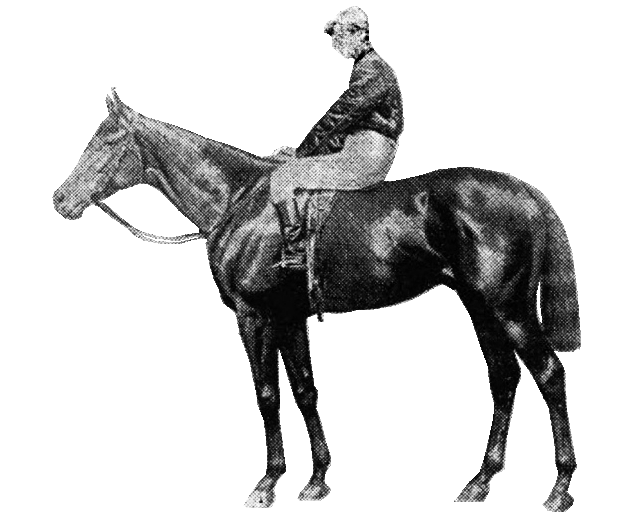
- Sire: Persimmon
- Grandsire: St. Simon
- Dam: Yours
- Damsire: Melton
- Sex: Stallion
- Foaled: 1905
- Country: United Kingdom
- Colour: Bay
- Breeder: Jack Barnato Joel
- Owner: Jack Barnato Joel
- Trainer: Charles Morton
- Record: 12: 5–1–1

Major wins
- St. James's Palace Stakes (1908); Eclipse Stakes (1908); St Leger Stakes (1908)

Awards
- Leading British money winner (1908)

Your Majesty (1905–1934) was a British Thoroughbred racehorse and sire, best known for highly unpopular wins the Eclipse Stakes and the Classic St Leger Stakes in 1908. The colt ran at least twelve times and won five races in a career which lasted from June 1907 until July 1909. Your Majesty was campaigned against the best of the year's two-year-olds in 1907 but won only once from five starts. The following season he finished unplaced in the 2000 Guineas and missed the Derby through illness. He then won four races in succession: the St. James's Palace Stakes at Royal Ascot, the Eclipse Stakes at Sandown Park, the St George Stakes at Liverpool and the St Leger at Doncaster. He was the leading money-winner of the British season but his successes were poorly received owing to the unpopularity of his owner. Your Majesty stayed in training as a four-year-old but failed to win. He was retired to stud where he became highly successful as a breeding stallion in Argentina.

== Background ==
Your Majesty was a dark-coated bay colt, standing 15.3 hands high, bred by his owner Jack Barnato Joel, the South African mining magnate and three-time British flat racing Champion Owner. The colt was foaled at Joel's stud at Northaw House in Middlesex. Joel sent his colt to his private trainer Charles Morton at Letcombe Bassett in Berkshire. At the end of his three-year-old season Morton described Your Majesty as "a natural stayer" and "dead game", but admitted that the colt tended to be nervous and excitable.

Your Majesty was sired by Persimmon, whose wins included the 1896 Derby, St Leger, Eclipse Stakes and Ascot Gold Cup and who went on to be British champion sire on four occasions. Your Majesty's dam, Yours, who failed to win a race herself, had previously produced Our Lassie, a filly who won The Oaks for Jack Joel in 1903. Our Lassie went on to become an influential broodmare, being the direct female ancestor of Mill Reef, Blushing Groom and Wollow.

== Racing career ==
=== 1907: two-year-old season ===
Your Majesty's racing career began at Royal Ascot in June 1907, when he finished unplaced in the five furlong New Stakes behind Sir Archibald. The following month he showed his first sign of promise when he finished second to Vamose in the Prince of Wales's Stakes at Goodwood. Your Majesty's remaining starts of 1907 took place at Newmarket. He recorded his first win in the Boscawen Stakes and then contested two of the season's most prestigious two-year-old races. In the six furlong Middle Park Stakes he was unplaced behind Lesbia, a filly who had previously dead-heated with Vamose in the Imperial Produce Stakes. In late October Your Majesty ran unplaced in the seven furlong Dewhurst Stakes. which was won by the filly Rhodora.

=== 1908: three-year-old season ===
In the 2000 Guineas at Newmarket in May 2008, Your Majesty lost a great deal of ground at the start before finishing strongly to take sixth place behind the American-bred Norman, who won from Sir Archibald and White Eagle. The colt was then trained for The Derby but was withdrawn from the race after contacting strangles, a bacterial respiratory infection.

In the summer of 1908, Jack Joel brought a prosecution for blackmail against Robert "Bob" Sievier, a racehorse owner and trainer. Joel claimed that during Sievier's time as the proprietor of a newspaper called "The Winning Post", he had attempted to extract money from Joel in return for not publishing potentially damaging stories. The British public appear to have sided completely with London-born Sievier and became hostile towards Joel who, as a foreigner and a Jew, was regarded as an outsider.

Your Majesty returned to the racecourse for the St. James's Palace Stakes at Royal Ascot. Ridden by the nineteen-year-old Walter Griggs, he started at odds of 8/1 and recorded his first important success. He was then matched against older horses and in the ten furlong Eclipse Stakes at Sandown Park on 17 July. The £10,000 race was one of the most important of the season and Your Majesty was a 100/8 outsider in a field in which Lesbia and White Eagle were considered the main contenders. Despite heavy rain, the race attracted a very large crowd which included the King although Jack Joel stayed away. In the race, Griggs struggled to find a clear run for Your Majesty in the straight and switched the colt to the wide outside. As the more fancied horses struggled in the closing stages, Your Majesty produced a strong run to take the lead and won by two lengths from his fellow three-year-olds Santo Starto and Siberia. The result was received with a "storm of execration" from the pro-Sievier crowd and the winner returned to a "savage outburst of hoots and groans".

Your Majesty then confirmed his position as a leading contender for the St Leger by winning the St George Stakes at Liverpool. At Doncaster on 9 September, Your Majesty started a well-backed 11/8 favourite for the St Leger against nine opponents including Norman and the filly Signorinetta, the winner of the Derby and Oaks. Ridden as usual by Griggs he was settled in sixth place before moving up to fourth on the final turn. He took the lead from the pacemaker Pom early in the straight and established a clear advantage. In the closing stages he was strongly challenged by White Eagle, but ran on under strong pressure to win by half a length with a gap of four lengths back to Santo Strato in third. Despite the winner being heavily backed by the public, Griggs and Your Majesty returned to the winner's enclosure in what was described as "a chilling silence". Griggs, who regularly rode the colt in training, described Your Majesty after the race as "the gamest horse I ever rode".

At the end of the year, Your Majesty's earnings of £19,268 were the greatest for any British horse in 1908 enabling Persimmon to claim his third sires' championship whilst Joel became British flat racing Champion Owner for the first time and Morton claimed his only trainers' title.

=== 1909: four-year-old season ===
Your Majesty remained in training as a four-year-old, but did little to add to his reputation, and became difficult to train. His most notable performance came on 1 July when he finished third behind Dark Ronald in the Princess of Wales's Stakes at Newmarket's July course. Later in the month he was unplaced in the Eclipse Stakes behind the leading three-year-old Bayardo. Late in the season he reportedly broke down and was withdrawn from his remaining engagements. Despite his modest form in 1909 he was still highly regarded and Joel reportedly turned down an offer of £35,000 for the horse.

== Assessment and honours ==
In their book, A Century of Champions, based on the Timeform rating system, John Randall and Tony Morris rated Your Majesty an "average" winner of the St Leger and the best horse in Britain in 1908.

== Stud record ==
Your Majesty stood as a stallion in England for six seasons, during which his most successful offspring was Princess Dorrie, a filly who won the 1000 Guineas and The Oaks for Jack Joel in 1914. In the previous year he had been sold for £22,500 and exported to Argentina where he was based at the Haras Punta Lara. Following the success of Princess Dorrie, the stallion was bought by a French syndicate, but on the outbreak of war in 1914 he was returned to Argentina to stand at Haras Ojo de Agua. He was champion sire in Argentina in 1920 and 1926. Your Majesty died in 1934 at the age of twenty-nine.

== Pedigree ==
Pedigree of Your Majesty (GB), bay stallion, 1905
Sire Persimmon (GB) 1893	St Simon; 1881	Galopin*	Vedette
Sire Persimmon (GB) 1893	St Simon; 1881	Galopin*	Flying Duchess
Sire Persimmon (GB) 1893	St Simon; 1881	St Angela	King Tom
Sire Persimmon (GB) 1893	St Simon; 1881	St Angela	Adeline
Sire Persimmon (GB) 1893	Perdita II; 1881	Hampton	Lord Clifden
Sire Persimmon (GB) 1893	Perdita II; 1881	Hampton	Lady Langden
Sire Persimmon (GB) 1893	Perdita II; 1881	Hermione	Young Melbourne
Sire Persimmon (GB) 1893	Perdita II; 1881	Hermione	La Belle Helene
Dam Yours (ITY) 1894	Melton; 1882	Master Kildare	Lord Ronald
Dam Yours (ITY) 1894	Melton; 1882	Master Kildare	Silk
Dam Yours (ITY) 1894	Melton; 1882	Violet Melrose	Scottish Chief
Dam Yours (ITY) 1894	Melton; 1882	Violet Melrose	Violet
Dam Yours (ITY) 1894	Your Grace; 1886	Galliard	Galopin*
Dam Yours (ITY) 1894	Your Grace; 1886	Galliard	Mavis
Dam Yours (ITY) 1894	Your Grace; 1886	Grand Duchess	Lozenge
Dam Yours (ITY) 1894	Your Grace; 1886	Grand Duchess	Ladylike (Family: 22-d)

* Your Majesty is inbred 3S x 4D to the stallion Galopin, meaning that he appears third generation on the sire side of his pedigree and fourth generation on the dam side of his pedigree.
