= Henry Hayman Toulmin =

- Born: 1807
- Died: 1871 (aged 63–64); Hertfordshire, England
- Occupations: Ship owner, justice of the peace, high sheriff

Henry Hayman (sometimes spelled Heyman) Toulmin (1807 – 1871) was a wealthy British ship owner who became justice of the peace and High Sheriff of Hertfordshire.

== Biography ==
=== Early life ===
Henry and Calvert Toulmin - A great deal is known about these two brothers as they were wealthy ship owners and brokers and many records are available from several sources which throw light on their joint activities. In 1843 they were awarded the contract to deliver Her Majesty's Mail to and from Australia, and a full report of this activity, called "The Toulmin Packets", was recorded by Captain T. G. S. Ward.

=== Education ===
Aged 28, Toulmin settled in Dalston, a southwest district in the London Borough of Hackney. By the age of 34, he had moved to the northeast part of the borough, to Mount Pleasant Lane in Upper Clapton. Toulmin had clearly already made his fortune by 1851, when he was living at Bower House in Havering Village in Essex in 1851. Bower House was built in 1729 by John Baynes, using some of the materials from Henry VIII's Havering Palace, and is said to be the most notable residence in the village.

==== Marriage and children ====
In 1854, Toulmin gave up the Bower House and moved to Hertfordshire, where he purchased Childwickbury Estate from Joshua Lomax. Aged 59, Toulmin was both Justice of the Peace (J.P.) and High Sheriff of Hertfordshire. before his death in 1871 at age 64.

=== Expanded description ===
Toulmin's fortune largely came from shipping. His favourite ship was the Mary Florence, named after Toulmin's daughter, Mary Florence Toulmin who married Sir Charles Lawrence Young in 1863. When it came time to pass on his shipping business, none of Toulmin's three sons were interested. Part of the reason may be that Toulmin had already settled his house and lands on his son Henry Joseph, but retained the use of them during Toulmin's own lifetime. After he acquired enough money, Toulmin gave away his shipping fleet but retained the Mary Florence for a little longer. Toulmin left about £50,000 in his will. His beloved Childwickbury Estate was sold after Toulmin's death to Sir John Blundell Maple by Toulmin's son, Henry Joseph.

=== Death and afterward ===
Henry Joseph's daughter was the author Mary Carbery, who describes Henry Hayman (her grandfather) in her book Happy World.

== Vessels owned ==
- Egyptian (1841–1843)
