= Harry Toulmin =

Harry Toulmin may refer to:

- Harry Toulmin (Unitarian minister) (1766–1823), Unitarian minister who served as president of Transylvania Seminary, Secretary of State of Kentucky, and U.S. federal judge in Alabama
- Harry Aubrey Toulmin Sr. (1858–1942), Ohio lawyer who drafted the Wright Brothers' patent application for their "flying machine"
- Harry Theophilus Toulmin (1838–1916), U.S. District Court Judge in Alabama, grandson of the Unitarian minister
