= Charles Morton (racehorse trainer) =

British racehorse trainer

Charles Morton (1855–1936) was a British racehorse trainer. He was Champion Trainer in 1908. He trained at Wantage, primarily for Jack Barnato Joel, and trained Derby winners for Joel with Sunstar in 1911 and Humorist in 1921.
