= Childwickbury Stud =

Coordinates: 51.7893°N 0.351°W

Childwickbury Stud is a Thoroughbred horse breeding farm near St Albans, Hertfordshire, England.

Originally built in 1888 by Sir John Blundell Maple as part of his Childwickbury estate, he bred and raced Thoroughbreds and built Childwickbury Stud into a very successful horse breeding operation. Another prominent racehorse owner, Jack Barnato Joel, bought the estate including the stud farm around 1906. On his death in 1940, his son Jim Joel took over the operation. He too became a successful racehorse owner and breeder and maintained the property until 1978 when the stud and the manor were sold separately. Childwickbury Stud was then bought by the Marquesa de Moratella in 1993.

In December 2011 the Childwickbury Stud was sold and is currently owned by Paul and Sally Flatt.
