= British flat racing Champion Owner =

Owner whose horses have won the most prize money during a season

The Champion Owner of flat racing in Great Britain is the owner whose horses have won the most prize money during a season. The list below shows the Champion Owner for each year since 1894. Before 2015, the period for deciding the championship started on the day following the end of the turf Flat season and finished on the final day of the turf Flat season in the following year - for example, the 2013-14 championship ran from 10 November 2013 to 8 November 2014. From 2015, the championship has been decided by prize money won from the Guineas festival in May to British Champions Day in October.

- 1894 - Harry McCalmont
- 1895 - Leopold de Rothschild
- 1896 - Leopold de Rothschild
- 1897 - John Gubbins
- 1898 - Leopold de Rothschild
- 1899 - 1st Duke of Westminster
- 1900 - Albert Edward, Prince of Wales
- 1901 - Sir John Blundell Maple
- 1902 - Bob Sievier
- 1903 - Sir James Miller
- 1904 - Sir James Miller
- 1905 - William Hall Walker
- 1906 - 16th Earl of Derby
- 1907 - William Hall Walker
- 1908 - Jack Joel
- 1909 - Alfred Cox
- 1910 - Alfred Cox
- 1911 - 17th Earl of Derby
- 1912 - Thomas Pilkington
- 1913 - Jack Joel
- 1914 - Jack Joel
- 1915 - Ludwig Neumann
- 1916 - Sir Edward Hulton
- 1917 - Alfred Cox
- 1918 - Lady James Douglas
- 1919 - 1st Baron Glanely
- 1920 - Sir Robert Jardine
- 1921 - Solomon Joel
- 1922 - 1st Baron Woolavington
- 1923 - 17th Earl of Derby
- 1924 - Aga Khan III
- 1925 - 2nd Viscount Astor
- 1926 - 1st Baron Woolavington
- 1927 - 17th Earl of Derby
- 1928 - 17th Earl of Derby
- 1929 - Aga Khan III
- 1930 - Aga Khan III
- 1931 - Arthur Dewar
- 1932 - Aga Khan III
- 1933 - 17th Earl of Derby
- 1934 - Aga Khan III
- 1935 - Aga Khan III
- 1936 - 2nd Viscount Astor
- 1937 - Aga Khan III
- 1938 - 17th Earl of Derby
- 1939 - 6th Earl of Rosebery
- 1940 - 2nd Viscount Rothermere
- 1941 - 1st Baron Glanely
- 1942 - King George VI
- 1943 - Dorothy Paget
- 1944 - Aga Khan III
- 1945 - 17th Earl of Derby
- 1946 - Aga Khan III
- 1947 - Aga Khan III
- 1948 - Aga Khan III
- 1949 - Aga Khan III
- 1950 - Marcel Boussac
- 1951 - Marcel Boussac
- 1952 - Aga Khan III
- 1953 - Sir Victor Sassoon
- 1954 - Queen Elizabeth II
- 1955 - Lady Zia Wernher
- 1956 - Major Lionel Holliday
- 1957 - Queen Elizabeth II
- 1958 - John McShain
- 1959 - Prince Aly Khan
- 1960 - Sir Victor Sassoon
- 1961 - Major Lionel Holliday
- 1962 - Major Lionel Holliday
- 1963 - Jim Mullion
- 1964 - Howell E. Jackson
- 1965 - Jean Ternynck
- 1966 - Lady Zia Wernher
- 1967 - Jim Joel
- 1968 - Raymond R. Guest
- 1969 - David Robinson
- 1970 - Charles W. Engelhard Jr.
- 1971 - Paul Mellon
- 1972 - Jean Hislop
- 1973 - Nelson Bunker Hunt
- 1974 - Nelson Bunker Hunt
- 1975 - Carlo Vittadini
- 1976 - Daniel Wildenstein
- 1977 - Robert Sangster
- 1978 - Robert Sangster
- 1979 - Sir Michael Sobell
- 1980 - Simon Weinstock
- 1981 - Aga Khan IV
- 1982 - Robert Sangster
- 1983 - Robert Sangster
- 1984 - Robert Sangster
- 1985 - Sheikh Mohammed
- 1986 - Sheikh Mohammed
- 1987 - Sheikh Mohammed
- 1988 - Sheikh Mohammed
- 1989 - Sheikh Mohammed
- 1990 - Hamdan Al Maktoum
- 1991 - Sheikh Mohammed
- 1992 - Sheikh Mohammed
- 1993 - Sheikh Mohammed
- 1994 - Hamdan Al Maktoum
- 1995 - Hamdan Al Maktoum
- 1996 - Godolphin
- 1997 - Sheikh Mohammed
- 1998 - Godolphin
- 1999 - Godolphin
- 2000 - Aga Khan IV
- 2001 - Godolphin
- 2002 - Hamdan Al Maktoum
- 2003 - Khalid Abdullah
- 2004 - Godolphin
- 2005 - Hamdan Al Maktoum
- 2006 - Godolphin
- 2007 - Godolphin
- 2008 - Princess Haya of Jordan
- 2009 - Christopher Tsui
- 2010 - Khalid Abdullah
- 2011 - Khalid Abdullah
- 2012 - Godolphin
- 2013 - Godolphin
- 2014 - Hamdan Al Maktoum
- 2015 - Godolphin
- 2017 - Godolphin
- 2018 - Godolphin
- 2019 -
- 2020 - Hamdan Al Maktoum
- 2025 - Godolphin

== See also ==
- British flat racing Champion Jockey
- British flat racing Champion Apprentice
- British flat racing Champion Trainer
- Leading sire in Great Britain & Ireland
