= Jack Barnato Joel =

South African mining magnate and a champion horse breeder (1862 – 1940)

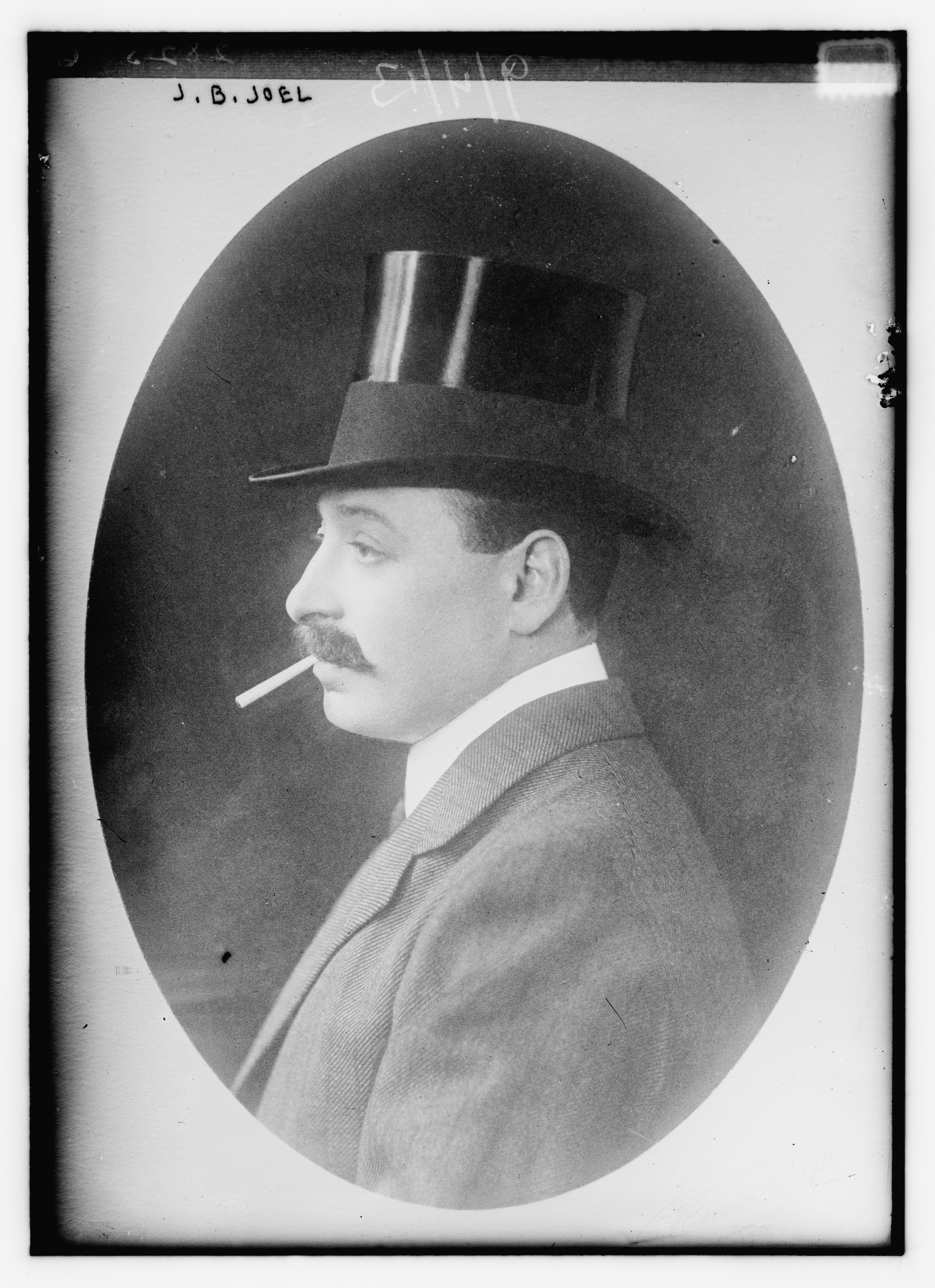
- Born: Isaac Barnato Joel; 29 September 1862; London, England
- Died: 13 November 1940 (aged 78); St. Albans, Hertfordshire
- Occupations: Mining magnate and horse breeder
- Spouse(s): Edith Fanny Richards (m. c. 1890–1901); Olive Coulson Sopwith (m. 1907–1937)
- Children: 3
- Parent(s): Joel Joel; Catherine "Kate" Isaacs
- Relatives: Solomon Joel (brother); Barney Barnato (uncle); Woolf Barnato (cousin)

Isaac "Jack" Barnato Joel (29 September 1862 – 13 November 1940) was a British -South African mining magnate and a champion horse breeder.

== Early life ==
Isaac Barnato Joel was born on 29 September 1862 into a Jewish family, being one of three sons of Joel Joel (1836/7–1893), a London tavernkeeper of the King of Prussia, and Catherine "Kate" Isaacs (1840–1917). Catherine's brother was Barnet Isaacs, later known as Barney Barnato (1851–1897). Along with his brothers Solomon Joel and Woolf Joel, he was taken under the wing of Barney Barnato and made a fortune from the Barnato Diamond Mining Company.

== Career ==
Joel was accused of Illicit Diamond Buying "IDB" in South Africa under the 1882 Diamond Trade Act violation, but Cecil Rhodes was able to get him released so he could return to London.

Joel served as Chairman of Johannesburg, South Africa Consolidated Investment Company Ltd from 1931 until his death in 1940. He also had a large interest in Diamond Corporation Ltd. and the De Beers Consolidated Mines, Ltd.

=== Thoroughbred Racing ===
Beginning in 1900 when he registered his colours of 'black jacket, scarlet cap', he was a thoroughbred racehorse owner and breeder, who won The Derby twice, first in 1911 with Sunstar in front of the King and Queen, and second in 1921 with Humorist.

He won the St Leger Stakes twice, first in 1908 with Your Majesty and again in 1914 with Black Jester. In 1914, he donated £1,000 from the St Leger prize money to various charities or "Relief Funds". He also won The Oaks four times. First in 1903 with Our Lassie, then in 1907 with Glass Doll, followed by a win in 1913 with Jest, and a consecutive win in 1914 with Princess Dorrie.

== Personal life ==
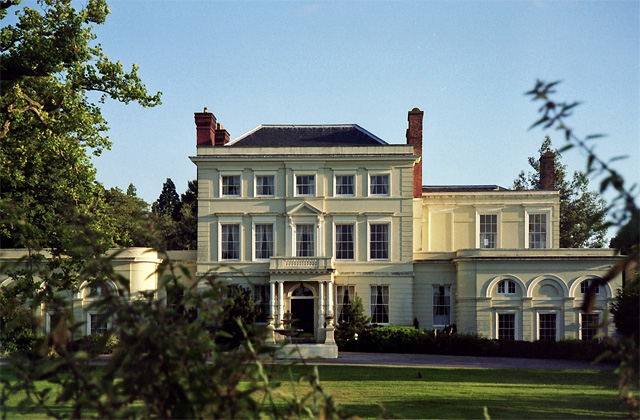
Northaw House

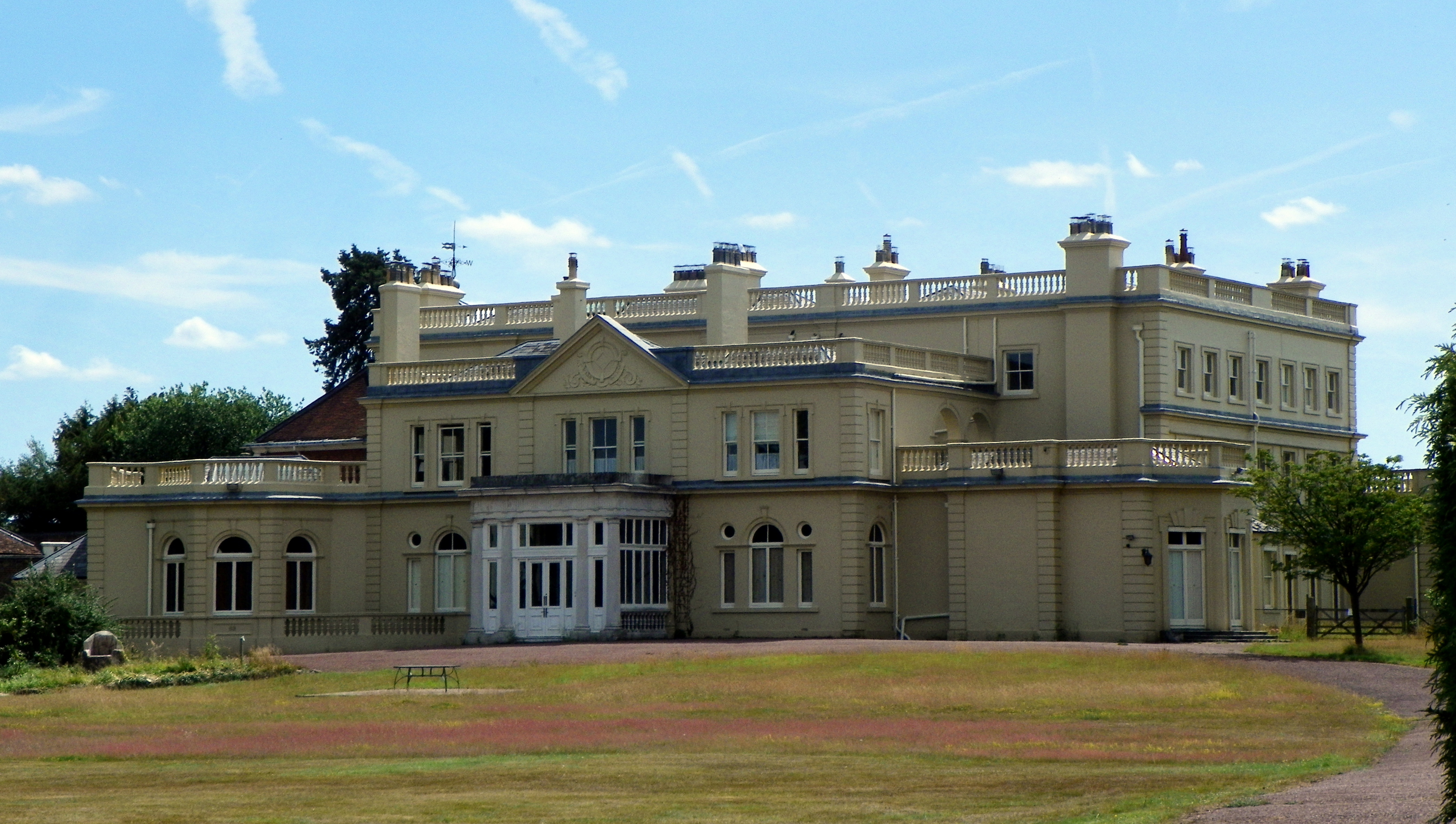
Childwickbury Manor house

Joel married Edith Fanny Richards (1866–1901), with whom he had three children:

- May Joel (1893–1971)
- Harry "Jim" Joel (1894–1992), who won the Thirsk Classic Trial Stakes in 1960, The Derby with Royal Palace in 1967, and the Grand National with Maori Venture in 1987.
- Kathleen Nellie Joel (b. 1890), who married George Henry Holt Freeman (born c. 1878) in 1914.

In 1907, after Edith's death, he married Olive Coulson Sopwith (1876–1937), daughter of Thomas Sopwith, an English mining engineer and local historian.

Joel died on 13 November 1941 at his home at St. Albans, Hertfordshire. His estate, valued at US$15,500,000 (equivalent to $339,281,674 in 2025) with an assessed inheritance tax of US$6,700,000 (equivalent to $146,657,240 in 2025), was left his son Harry. In his will, he stated that he was unable to leave any charitable donations because of the "crushing burden of present-day taxation."

=== Residences ===
In 1905, his residence was 34 Grosvenor Square in the Mayfair district of London, England, the former home of Sir George Beaumont, 7th Baronet and Robert Richardson-Gardner, and Northaw House in Northaw, Hertfordshire.

In 1906, Joel purchased Childwickbury Manor and the stud farm from the estate of Sir John Blundell Maple, 1st Baronet, who had built a horse farm there. After the death of his son, the stud farm was purchased by the Marquesa de Moratella and in 1978, Stanley Kubrick, the film director, bought the manor, his widow, Christiane Kubrick, continues to live in the home.

== See also ==
- Joel family
