= Melton (horse) =

British-bred Thoroughbred racehorse

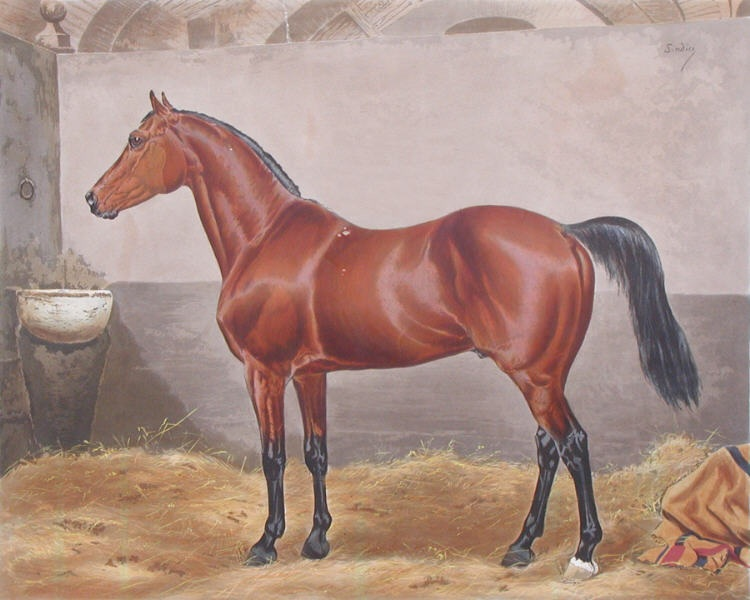
- Melton by Eugene Tily
- Sire: Master Kildare
- Grandsire: Lord Ronald
- Dam: Violet Melrose
- Damsire: Scottish Chief
- Sex: Stallion
- Foaled: 1882
- Country: United Kingdom of Great Britain and Ireland
- Colour: Bay
- Breeder: George Manners Astley, 20th Baron Hastings
- Owner: George Manners Astley, 20th Baron Hastings
- Trainer: Mathew Dawson
- Record: 18: 11-3-0
- Earnings: £

Major wins
- New Stakes (1884); Middle Park Plate (1884); Epsom Derby (1885); St Leger (1885); July Cup (1886)

Honours
- Premio Melton

Melton (1882–1910) was a British Thoroughbred racehorse and sire. In a career that lasted from 1884 to 1886 he ran eighteen times and won eleven races. In 1885 he won the second two legs of the English Triple Crown, the Derby at Epsom and the St Leger at Doncaster. At the end of the 1886 season he was retired to stud where he had considerable success in both Italy and Great Britain.

== Background ==
Melton was a small, but powerful and good-looking bay horse, bred by his owner George Manners Astley, 20th Baron Hastings (1857–1904) a country gentleman who named the colt after the village of Melton Constable in Norfolk. He was trained by Mathew Dawson at his Heath House stable at Newmarket, Suffolk. Melton was ridden in most of his races by the thirteen-time Champion Jockey Fred Archer.

Melton’s sire, Master Kildare, who was also owned by Lord Hastings, was a successful racehorse who won the Alexandra Plate at Royal Ascot and the City and Suburban Handicap at Epsom. In his first season at stud he attracted little interest from breeders and sired only three foals: one of these was Melton. Melton’s dam was Violet Melrose a winner of six races.

== Racing career ==
=== 1884: two-year-old season ===
Melton began his career in the New Stakes (now called the Norfolk Stakes) at Royal Ascot in June 1884 in which he recorded an unexpected victory from Match Girl and his stable companion Langwell, who started favourite. On his next start in the July Stakes at Newmarket Melton started 11/10 favourite. He looked the likely winner in the closing stages but was finished beaten a head by Luminary, with the two finishing well clear of the other four runners.

In October at Newmarket Melton ran in the year’s most prestigious two-year-old race, the Middle Park Plate. He started at 10/1 with the favourite being an unnamed colt (later named Paradox) owned by the Duke of Westminster. Fred Archer held Melton up in the early stages before moving him up into a challenging position approaching the final furlong. Melton quickened well and won a "most exciting" race by half a length from Xantrailles, with the Duke of Westminster's colt and Royal Hampton dead-heating for third. On his final start of the year he carried top weight in the Criterion Stakes over the same course on October 20, starting at odds of 2/5 and winning "in a canter" by one and a half lengths from Golden Ray. The win took his earnings for the season to £4,872.

Melton went into the winter break as second favourite for the following year's Derby at odds of 10/1, and was reported to be the chosen ride of Fred Archer.

=== 1885: three-year-old season ===
Melton did not run in the 2000 Guineas, but made his seasonal reappearance in the Payne Stakes over ten furlongs at Newmarket in mid May. He started at odds of 2/5 and won "with great ease" from Kingwood and the future Oaks winner Lonely, to confirm his status as a leading contender for the Derby.

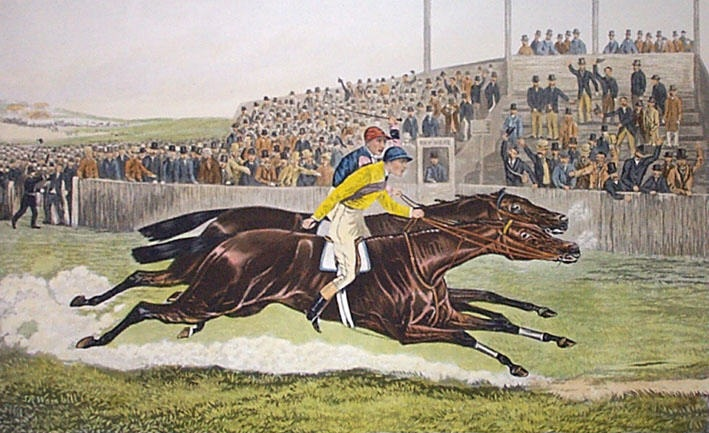
The 1885 Derby, Melton defeats Paradox

At Epsom on 3 June, Melton started favourite at odds of 15/8 in a field of twelve. The race took place in brilliant weather before an enormous crowd which included the Prince and Princess of Wales. His main rival was expected to be Paradox (4/1), who, since being beaten in the Middle Park Stakes, had won the Dewhurst Stakes and the 2000 Guineas. Melton was held up near the back of the field as Royal Hampton made the early running and led into the straight. Xantrailles made a brief challenge to show in front before quickly dropping away. When Royal Hampton weakened two furlongs out, Paradox took the lead and was immediately challenged by Archer on Melton. From that point on the two had the race between them. Melton made gradual but relentless progress to catch Paradox "in the last stride" and win by a head in a "desperate finish", with Archer riding one of his strongest races. The result of the race was reported to have been transmitted to New York within three seconds. Melton's win, which cost the English bookmakers an estimated £450,000, made him the first Middle Park Plate winner to go on to take the Derby. Oscar Wilde was reported to have observed "I understand that Milton's Paradise Lost is being revived and will appear in Derby Week and will be published under the title Paradox Lost by Melton."

Melton did not run again until the St Leger at Doncaster on 16 September. He started 40/95 favourite in a field of ten, with Isobar and Lonely next in the betting at 10/1. Melton broke quickly but was restrained by Archer and raced in last place as Dunbridge made the early running. Approaching the turn into the straight, Lonely had moved into the lead with Melton moving into contention. As the leaders drifted wide on the home turn, Archer drove Melton through the gap on the inside and quickly opened up a clear lead. Isobar emerged as a challenger halfway down the straight, but Melton responded to Archer's spur and pulled right away to win "in grand style" by six lengths from Isobar, with Lonely in third.

On his final start of the year Melton started at odds of 1/25 for Great Foal Stakes over ten furlongs at Newmarket on September 30. He was never in any danger and won "hard held" by one and a half lengths from his stable companion Pearl Diver, to whom he was conceding seven pounds. Around this time Lord Hastings issued a challenge to Jack Hammond, the owner of St. Gatien for £1,000 a match race between Melton and the 1884 Derby winner, with Melton to receive nine pounds. The challenge was declined, as St Gatien had already been heavily backed for the Cambridgeshire Handicap. After St Gatien was beaten under 136 pounds in the Cambridgeshire, Hammond responded to Hastings by suggesting that a match could take place the following season for a stake of between £5,000 and £20,000.

=== 1886: four-year-old season ===
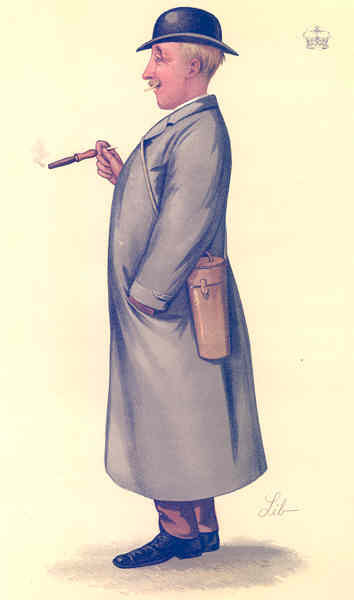
George Manners Astley, Melton's owner and breeder

Early in 1886, Melton was reported to have defeated St Gatien at level weights in a private trial, although details are few and it is unclear whether or not this was an official match. Melton officially began his four-year-old season in the Hardwicke Stakes, in which he was matched against the outstanding three-year-old Ormonde for a much anticipated contest. Ormonde was made 30/100 favourite, with Melton on 7/2. Ormonde took the lead from his pacemaker Coracle at the start of the straight, and although Melton chased hard he was never able to get on terms. On the line, he was still two lengths behind the younger colt to whom he was conceding sixteen pounds. Melton recorded a meaningless win on his next start, when he frightened away all the opposition in the Newcastle Gold Cup and was allowed to walk over. Having established himself as an excellent middle-distance performer and stayer, Melton was dropped in distance for his next two starts. At Newmarket he started 5/4 favourite for the July Cup over six furlongs. Archer sent Melton into the lead before halfway, and in the closing stages he pulled clear to win easily by three lengths from Brighton and Fulmen.

In the next phase of his career, Melton moved into handicap races with limited success. On 21 July he carried top weight of 130 won the Leicestershire Cup over one mile, and won impressively, beating twelve opponents in a common canter. Five days later at Goodwood he carried 146 pounds in the Stewards’ Cup and finished unplaced behind Crafton who carried 109. Two days after this defeat he reappeared in the ten furlong Chesterfield Cup at the same course, again under 146 pounds, and finished unplaced behind Saraband after racing prominently until the closing stages. The decision to run the colt under such heavy weights was strongly criticised in some quarters.

A rematch between Ormonde and Melton at level weights, with Bendigo and The Bard also invited, was proposed for October at Newmarket, but failed to materialise despite considerable interest.

At Newmarket on 1 October he started favourite for the October Handicap, but ran disappointingly behind an unnamed filly (later named Creeper) to whom he was conceding fifty pounds. On 22 October he put up an improved effort when finishing fourth to The Sailor Prince under top weight of 133 pounds in the Cambridgeshire.

A move up to staying distances followed, as he contested the Jockey Club Cup over two and a quarter miles. In this race he finally met St Gatien in public but proved no match for the five-year-old, who won by eight lengths. Later reports suggested that Melton had been running "drunk" having been given a drink of whisky and water before the race. After this defeat, some felt that it was "madness" to persevere with the colt, but on November 9 he was sent to Liverpool for the one and a half mile Liverpool Autumn Cup. Carrying top weight as usual, Melton was not well fancied but managed to end his career with a victory, taking the lead inside the last quarter mile and running on strongly under Jack Watts to win by two lengths.

== Stud career ==
Melton retired to the Falmouth House stud at Newmarket for one season and was then moved to the Hampton Court stud for the next two years. He was then sold for £10,000 and exported to Italy, where he spent the next seven years at a stud near Pisa. In 1897 he returned to England and stood at the Westerham Hill stud. Melton died on 26 November 1910 at the very advanced age (for a Thoroughbred) of twenty-eight. He sired many winners in both England and Italy, but the best of his progeny was the outstanding American performer Sysonby.

== Pedigree ==
Pedigree of Melton (GB), bay stallion, 1882
Sire Master Kildare (GB) 1875	Lord Ronald; 1862	Stockwell	The Baron
Sire Master Kildare (GB) 1875	Lord Ronald; 1862	Stockwell	Pocahontas
Sire Master Kildare (GB) 1875	Lord Ronald; 1862	Edith	Newminster
Sire Master Kildare (GB) 1875	Lord Ronald; 1862	Edith	Deidamia
Sire Master Kildare (GB) 1875	Silk; 1869	Plum Pudding	Sweetmeat
Sire Master Kildare (GB) 1875	Silk; 1869	Plum Pudding	Foinnualla
Sire Master Kildare (GB) 1875	Silk; 1869	Judy Go	Dey of Algiers
Sire Master Kildare (GB) 1875	Silk; 1869	Judy Go	Cacique
Dam Violet Melrose (GB) 1875	Scottish Chief; 1861	Lord of the Isles	Touchstone
Dam Violet Melrose (GB) 1875	Scottish Chief; 1861	Lord of the Isles	Fair Helen
Dam Violet Melrose (GB) 1875	Scottish Chief; 1861	Miss Ann	The Little Known
Dam Violet Melrose (GB) 1875	Scottish Chief; 1861	Miss Ann	Bay Missy
Dam Violet Melrose (GB) 1875	Violet; 1864	Thormanby	Windhound
Dam Violet Melrose (GB) 1875	Violet; 1864	Thormanby	Alice Hawthorn
Dam Violet Melrose (GB) 1875	Violet; 1864	Woodbine	Stockwell
Dam Violet Melrose (GB) 1875	Violet; 1864	Woodbine	Honeysuckle (Family: 8-g)
