= Lochangel =

British-bred Thoroughbred racehorse

- Sire: Night Shift
- Grandsire: Northern Dancer
- Dam: Peckitt's Well
- Damsire: Lochnager
- Sex: Mare
- Foaled: 5 April 1994
- Country: United Kingdom
- Colour: Chestnut
- Breeder: Littleton Stud
- Owner: Jeff Smith
- Trainer: Ian Balding
- Record: 20: 3-5-2
- Earnings: £177,644

Major wins
- Blue Seal Stakes (1996); Somerset Stakes (1998); Nunthorpe Stakes (1998)

Lochangel (foaled 5 April 1994) was a British Thoroughbred racehorse and broodmare. She raced for the connections of her more famous older sister Lochsong and while never matching the achievements of her sibling she became a top-class racemare who excelled in sprint races on firm ground. As a juvenile she was beaten on her debut before winning at Ascot Racecourse in the sixth of what became known as Frankie Dettori's "Magnificent Seven". After failing to win in four attempts in 1997 she reached her peak as a four-year-old in 1998 when she won two races including the Group One Nunthorpe Stakes at York Racecourse in August. She failed to win again and was retired from racing in 1999.

== Background ==
Lochangel is a chestnut mare with a white star and two white socks bred by her owner, Jeff Smith's Littleton Stud. She was sired by the American-bred stallion Night Shift, a son of Northern Dancer. Night Shift sired many other good racehorses in a long stud career, including In The Groove, Azamour, Well Chief, Barons Pit (Diadem Stakes) and Nicolotte (Queen Anne Stakes). Lochangel's dam Peckitt's Well was a useful racemare who won five races over sprint distances and was rated 98 by Timeform in 1985. As a broodmare she made an immediate impact with her first foal Lochsong who was twice champion sprinter in Europe and was voted Cartier Horse of the Year in 1993. Peckitt's Well was a distant descendant of the broodmare Fair Terms, the female-line ancestor of several major Japanese winners including Narita Brian.

Like Lochong, Lochangel was trained throughout her racing career by Ian Balding at Kingsclere in Hampshire. Like many of Balding's trainees, she usually raced in a white sheepskin noseband.

== Racing career ==
=== 1996: two-year-old season ===
On her racecourse debut, Lochangel finished second in a maiden race over six furlongs at Kempton Park Racecourse on 7 September 1996. Three weeks later she was ridden by Frankie Dettori and started 5/4 joint favourite for the Blue Seal Stakes (for fillies with no more than one previous start) at Ascot Racecourse. She led from the start and won by three-quarters of a length from the Henry Cecil-trained Corsini. Her win was significant as it was the sixth of Dettori's "Magnificent Seven": the 25-year-old Italian jockey won all seven races on the card including the Queen Elizabeth II Stakes on Mark of Esteem, driving several bookmakers to near financial ruin.

=== 1997: three-year-old season ===
Lochangel began her second season in the Listed Chartwell Fillies' Stakes over seven furlongs at Lingfield Park Racecourse on 10 May. Starting the 5/2 favourite she led for most of the way but tired and was overtaken in the final furlong, finishing third behind Supercal and Baked Alaska. The filly was off the course for four months before returning in an all-aged handicap race at Goodwood Racecourse on 13 September in which she finished a close fourth under top weight of 139 pounds. Two weeks later she was stepped up in class for the Group Three Diadem Stakes at Ascot but finished unplaced behind Elnadim. On her only other appearance of the year she finished seventh of nine behind the five-year-old Bowden Rose in a handicap for fillies and mares at Newmarket Racecourse in October.

=== 1998: four-year-old season ===
On her first appearance as a four-year-old Lochangel started favourite for a minor stakes event over five furlongs at Bath Racecourse on 28 April and finished second, two lengths behind the five-year-old gelding Speed On. At the same track two weeks later the filly contested the Listed Somerset Stakes and started favourite against eight opponents including Carranita (winner of the Summer Stakes and the Hopeful Stakes), Nadwah (Queen Mary Stakes) and Hever Golf Rose. Ridden by Martin Dwyer, she took the lead a quarter of a mile from the finish and drew away in the closing stages to record her first win for seventeen months, beating Desert Lady by three and a half lengths. Frankie Dettori resumed his partnership with the filly when she was stepped up in class for the Temple Stakes at Sandown on 25 May. She took the lead a furlong out but was overtaken and beaten three quarters of a length by the six-year-old gelding Bolshoi, with Elnadim in third and Compton Place among the unplaced runners.

At Royal Ascot in June she was one nineteen sprinters to contest the King's Stand Stakes. She led for most of the way but was again caught by Bolshoi in the final strides and was beaten one and a quarter lengths by the winner. In the King George Stakes at Goodwood in July she started favourite but finished third behind Land of Dreams and Lady Alexander after being hampered inside the final furlong.

On 20 August Lochangel, with Dettori in the saddle, contested the Group One Nunthorpe Stakes over five furlongs on firm groundat York Racecourse and started the 6/1 third choice in the betting behind Elnadim and Land of Dreams. Bolshoi was again in the field whilst the other runners included Arkadian Hero (Mill Reef Stakes), Sainte Marine (Prix du Gros Chêne), Bollin Joanne (Duke of York Stakes), My Best Valentine (Bentinck Stakes), Averti (King George Stakes, 1997), Rambling Bear (King George Stakes, 1996), Yorkies Boy (Palace House Stakes) and Almaty (Molecomb Stakes). The French challenger Sainte Marine went into the lead and set a strong pace with Lochangel among her closest pursuers. In the last quarter mile Dettori tracked to the right and Lochangel made her challenge along the stands-side rail. She overtook the French filly inside the final furlong and won by a length, with the outsiders Dashing Blue (also trained by Ian Balding), Bishops Court and Rambling Bear filling the next three places. Her win was enthusiastically received by the York crowd, many of whom had backed the filly owing to Dettori's popularity. Asked to compare the winner to her older sister, Balding said "They're both super movers with devastating speed, but Lochangel is an awful lot easier to train. I adored Lochsong but she was half crazy".

Lochangel was tried over six furlongs for the first time in almost a year when she started 9/2 second favourite for the Haydock Sprint Cup in September and finished sixth behind the three-year-old Tamarisk. On her final appearance of the year she was sent to France for the Prix de l'Abbaye over 1000 metres at Longchamp Racecourse in October. She finished sixth behind My Best Valentine after fading in the last 200 metres.

=== 1999: five-year-old season ===
Lochangel remained in training in 1999 but failed to win in six starts. She produced her best performance on her seasonal debut when she finished second to Tipsy Creek in the Temple Stakes on 31 May. She then finished fourth in the King's Stand Stakes before running unplaced behind Stravinsky in the July Cup and the Nunthorpe Stakes. She was then sent to Ireland and dropped in class for the Flying Five at Leopardstown Racecourse in September and started favourite but finished third to Tedburrow. Lochangel made her final appearance later that month in the World Trophy (then a Listed race) at Newbury. She never looked likely to win and finished seventh of the thirteen runners behind Imperial Beauty.

Her retirement was announced shortly after her run at Newbury. Balding said "She's been a wonderful mare for the stable, and had so much class and a lovely temperament. I actually think Lochangel has been desperately unlucky this season. She was badly drawn in the King's Stand Stakes, which I thought she had a great chance of winning, and since then the going has gone against her... Now I just hope she produces lots of lovely babies – and you can be sure they'll be coming to me!"

== Breeding record ==
Lochangel was retired from racing to become a broodmare for the Littleton Stud. The mare was offered for sale at Tattersalls in December 2007 but was bought back by Jeff Smith when the bidding stopped at 150,000 guineas. To date she has produced eight named foals:

- Star Pupil, a chestnut colt, foaled in 2001, sired by Selkirk. Won one race.
- Angel Wing, chestnut filly, 2002, by Barathea. Unraced, dam of Norse King (Prix du Conseil de Paris, Prix Exbury).
- Apache Angel, chestnut colt (later gelded), 2003, by Indian Ridge
- Indian Angel, chestnut filly, 2005, by Indian Ridge. Unraced.
- Celestial Dream, bay filly, 2006, by Oasis Dream. Won one race.
- Strictly Dancing, bay filly, 2007, by Danehill Dancer. Won one race. Dam of Dancing Star (Stewards' Cup).
- Heavenly Song, bay filly, 2008, by Oratorio. Failed to win in two races.
- Verne Castle, chestnut colt, 2013, by Sakhee's Secret.

== Pedigree ==
Pedigree of Lochangel (GB), chestnut mare, 1994
Sire Night Shift (USA) 1980	Northern Dancer (CAN); 1961	Nearctic	Nearco
Sire Night Shift (USA) 1980	Northern Dancer (CAN); 1961	Nearctic	Lady Angela
Sire Night Shift (USA) 1980	Northern Dancer (CAN); 1961	Natalma	Native Dancer
Sire Night Shift (USA) 1980	Northern Dancer (CAN); 1961	Natalma	Almahmoud
Sire Night Shift (USA) 1980	Ciboulette (CAN); 1961	Chip Chop	Flares
Sire Night Shift (USA) 1980	Ciboulette (CAN); 1961	Chip Chop	Sceptical
Sire Night Shift (USA) 1980	Ciboulette (CAN); 1961	Windy Answer	Windfields
Sire Night Shift (USA) 1980	Ciboulette (CAN); 1961	Windy Answer	Reply
Dam Peckitts Well (GB) 1982	Lochnager (GB); 1972	Dumbarnie	Dante
Dam Peckitts Well (GB) 1982	Lochnager (GB); 1972	Dumbarnie	Lost Soul
Dam Peckitts Well (GB) 1982	Lochnager (GB); 1972	Miss Barbara	Le Dieu d'Or
Dam Peckitts Well (GB) 1982	Lochnager (GB); 1972	Miss Barbara	Barbarona
Dam Peckitts Well (GB) 1982	Great Grey Niece (GB); 1976	Great Nephew	Honeyway
Dam Peckitts Well (GB) 1982	Great Grey Niece (GB); 1976	Great Nephew	Sybils Niece
Dam Peckitts Well (GB) 1982	Great Grey Niece (GB); 1976	Grey Shoes	Grey Sovereign
Dam Peckitts Well (GB) 1982	Great Grey Niece (GB); 1976	Grey Shoes	Evening Shoe (Family: 13-a)
