= Seaton Delaval Stakes =

Discontinued flat horse race in Britain

- Class: Group 3
- Location: Newcastle Racecourse; Newcastle, England
- Inaugurated: 1867
- Final run: 13 August 1985
- Race type: Flat / Thoroughbred
- Website: Newcastle

Race information
- Distance: 5f (1,006 metres); 7f (1,408 metres)
- Surface: Turf
- Track: Straight
- Qualification: Two-year-olds

The Seaton Delaval Stakes was a Group 3 flat horse race in Great Britain open to two-year-old horses. It was run at Newcastle, and in its later years it was scheduled to take place in August.

== History ==
The event was named after Seaton Delaval, a village located to the north of Newcastle. It was established in 1867, and was originally held in late June. For much of its history it took place on the day after the Northumberland Plate. It was usually contested over 5 furlongs.

The Seaton Delaval Stakes continued to be staged in June until 1961. It was switched to early August in 1962. The present grading system was introduced in 1971, and the event was classed at Group 3 level. It was extended to 7 furlongs in 1976.

The race was discontinued after 1985.

== Records ==
Leading jockey since 1900 (4 wins):

- Billy Nevett – Old Friend (1929), Blue Charm (1934), Royal Romance (1936), Dornoch (1951)
- Lester Piggott – Pinched (1957), Tin Whistle (1959), Sky Rocket (1967), Blessed Rock (1973)

Leading trainer since 1900 (4 wins):

- Geoffrey Barling – North Cone (1954), Lunar Way (1956), Unity (1964), Galipar (1966)

== Winners since 1900 ==
Year	Winner	Jockey	Trainer
1900	Orchid	Thomas Weldon	Felix Leach
1901	Abbot's Anne	Mornington Cannon	John Porter
1902	Mrs Gamp	Danny Maher	Richard Marsh
1903	Henry the First		Gilbert
1904	Cyanean	Bernard Dillon	Jack Fallon
1905	Illustrious	William Griggs	Cort
1906	Orwell	Herbert Randall	Reg Day
1907	Bromus	Otto Madden	James Ryan
1908	Holiday House	Otto Madden	George Chaloner
1909	Charles O'Malley	William Saxby	Lewis
1910	Manwolf	Elijah Wheatley	Matthew D Peacock
1911	Combination	Fred Rickaby Jr.	Butters
1912	St Begoe	Billy Higgs	Sam Darling
1913	Cressingham	Danny Maher	Charles Archer
1914	Egretta	William Saxby	J Smith
1915-18	No race
1919	Prince Herod	Steve Donoghue	Harry Cottrill
1920	Thunderer	Steve Donoghue	Charles Morton
1921	Ethereal (Note: In 1921 Ethereal was unnamed and raced as 'Seraph colt')	William Griggs	Robert Colling
1922	Prunus	Joseph Thwaites	Wilmot
1923	Appleby	Ted Gardner	Basil Jarvis
1924	Iron Mask	Bobby Jones	Harry Cottrill
1925	Blackmoor	George Archibald Sr.	Charles Peck
1926	Helene	Harry Beasley Jr.	Atty Persse
1927	Carsebreck	Harry Wragg	Tom Waugh Sr.
1928	Sonnelli	George Baines	Felix Leach Jr.
1929	Old Friend	Billy Nevett	Matthew D Peacock
1930	Pot-Pourri	Tommy Weston	Frank Butters
1931	Bonnie Briar	Tommy Weston	Tom Waugh Sr.
1932	Jim Thomas (Note: In 1932 Jim Thomas was unnamed and raced as 'Honour Bright colt')	Arthur Wragg	Stanley Wootton
1933	Armour Bright	Ronald James	Jack Colling
1934	Blue Charm	Billy Nevett	Matthew D Peacock
1935	Don Valley (Note: In 1935 Don Valley was unnamed and raced as 'Sister Anne colt')	Harry Wragg	Charles Elsey
1936	Royal Romance	Billy Nevett	Matthew J Peacock
1937	Conversation Piece (Note: In 1937 Conversation Piece was unnamed and raced as 'Tete-a-Tete filly')	Rufus Beasley	Atty Persse
1938	Buoyant	Fred Herbert	Noel Cannon
1939	Tullyford	Richard Perryman	Ted Leader
1940-46	No race
1947	Gold Mist	Harry Carr	Noel Murless
1948	Ballisland	Charlie Smirke	Dick Warden
1949	Peter Anthony	Ken Gethin	Harry Wragg
1950	Judith Paris	Eph Smith	Rufus Beasley
1951	Dornoch	Billy Nevett	Matthew J Peacock
1952	Good Brandy	Geoff Littlewood	Harry Peacock
1953	Tiger Kloof	Manny Mercer	Harry Wragg
1954	North Cone	Geoff Littlewood	Geoffrey Barling
1955	Vigo	Jack Brace	Bill Dutton
1956	Lunar Way	Frank Barlow	Geoffrey Barling
1957	Pinched	Lester Piggott	Noel Murless
1958	Lindsay	Eddie Larkin	Richard Peacock
1959	Tin Whistle	Lester Piggott	Pat Rohan
1960	China Clipper	Liam Ward	Tommy Shaw
1961	La Tendresse	Ron Hutchinson	Paddy Prendergast
1962	Dunce Cap	David Morris	Cecil Boyd-Rochfort
1963	Abandoned due to waterlogging
1964	Unity	Taffy Thomas	Geoffrey Barling
1965	Gay Palm	Johnny Seagrave	Pat Rohan
1966	Galipar	Taffy Thomas	Geoffrey Barling
1967	Sky Rocket	Lester Piggott	Sam Armstrong
1968	Lady's View	Duncan Keith	Peter Ashworth
1969	Goldwyn	Jimmy Etherington	Mick Easterby
1970	Melodina	Sandy Barclay	Noel Murless
1971	Sharpen Up	Willie Carson	Bernard van Cutsem
1972	Rapid River	Tommy Kelsey	Arthur Stephenson
1973	Blessed Rock	Lester Piggott	Jeremy Hindley
1974	Asterina	Geoff Lewis	Noel Murless
1975	Sweet Nightingale	Bruce Raymond	Mick Easterby
1976	Nice Balance	Brian Taylor	Ryan Price
1977	Sexton Blake	Willie Carson	Barry Hills
1978	Abandoned due to waterlogging
1979	Final Straw	Greville Starkey	Michael Stoute
1980	Robellino	John Matthias	Ian Balding
1981	Zilos	Edward Hide	Bruce Hobbs
1982	All Systems Go	George Duffield	Gavin Pritchard-Gordon
1983	Knoxville	Steve Cauthen	Barry Hills
1984	Zaizafon	Steve Cauthen	Barry Hills
1985	Moorgate Man	Pat Eddery	Ron Boss

== Earlier winners ==
- 1867: La Mousse
- 1868: Number Nip
- 1869: Agility
- 1870: King of the Forest
- 1871: Hunsdon
- 1872: Mediator
- 1873: Organist
- 1874: Holy Friar
- 1876: Black Knight
- 1877: Carillon
- 1878: Jennie Agnes
- 1879: Novice
- 1880: Abbess of Beauchief
- 1881: Bonnie Rose
- 1882: Chislehurst
- 1883: Knight Errant
- 1884: Albert
- 1885: Minting
- 1886: Lady Muncaster
- 1887: Friday
- 1888: Chittabob
- 1889: Loup
- 1890: Cleator
- 1891: Persistive
- 1892: New Guinea
- 1893: Chin Chin
- 1894: Jim Selby
- 1895: Amaryllis
- 1896: Fiorini
- 1897: De Rougement
- 1898: Model Agnes
- 1899: O'Donovan Rossa

== See also ==
- Horse racing in Great Britain
- List of British flat horse races
