= Carry On Katie =

American-bred Thoroughbred racehorse

- Racing silks of Lucayan Stud; Mohammed Rashid and Godolphin
- Sire: Fasliyev
- Grandsire: Nureyev
- Dam: Dinka Raja
- Damsire: Woodman
- Sex: Mare
- Foaled: 14 January 2001
- Country: United States
- Colour: Brown
- Breeder: Swordlestown Stud
- Owner: Lucayan Stud; Mohammed Rashid; Godolphin
- Trainer: Jeremy Noseda; Saeed bin Suroor
- Record: 5: 3-0-0
- Earnings: £158,149

Major wins
- Lowther Stakes (2003); Cheveley Park Stakes (2003)

Carry On Katie (foaled 14 January 2001) is an American-bred British-trained Thoroughbred racehorse and broodmare. She was undefeated in three races as a juvenile in 2003 when she was one of the best two-year-old fillies of her generation in Britain. After winning by twelve lengths on her debut she won the Group Two Lowther Stakes and the Group One Cheveley Park Stakes. After being transferred to the ownership of Godolphin Racing for the 2004 season, she was well-beaten in the 1000 Guineas and the Poule d'Essai des Pouliches, and was retired from racing. She has made no impact as a broodmare.

== Background ==
Carry On Katie is a brown mare with a narrow white blaze foaled in Kentucky and bred by the County Kildare-based Swordlestown Stud. She was from the first crop of foals sired by Fasliyev, who was undefeated in five races before his racing career was ended by injury at the end of his two-year-old season. His other offspring have included Chineur (King's Stand Stakes), City Leader (Royal Lodge Stakes), Amico Fritz (Goldene Peitsche) and Steppe Dancer (September Stakes). Carry On Katie's dam Dinka Raja, was an unraced daughter of Woodman and a great-granddaughter of the outstanding racemare Cawston's Pride whose other descendants have included Solinus and Kostroma.

In August 2002 the yearling filly was offered for sale at Deauville and was bought for €100,000 by the bloodstock agent Dwayne Woods. The filly entered the ownership of Edward St George's Lucayan Stud and was sent into training with Jeremy Noseda at Newmarket.

== Racing career ==
=== 2003: two-year-old season ===
On her racecourse debut, Carrie On Katie started 7/4 favourite for a six furlong maiden race at Ascot Racecourse on 25 July. Ridden by Darryll Holland, she started slowly, but took the lead after a furlong before accelerating in the last quarter mile. She drew away from her four rivals in the closing stages and won "easily" by twelve lengths from Three Secrets. After the race the filly was bought in a private deal by Mohammed Rashid, a friend of the Maktoum family. Rumours that the deal involved Sheikh Mohammed's Godolphin Racing organisation were denied.

Carrie On Katie was moved up in class for the Group Two Lowther Stakes at York Racecourse on 21 August in which she was ridden by Frankie Dettori. The filly was expected to start favourite, but after fighting against Dettori's attempts to restrain her on the way to the start she went off 3/1 second choice behind the Albany Stakes winner Silca's Gift. She took the lead and set the pace down the centre of the track before accelerating approaching the final furlong and winning by two lengths from Badminton with Dunloskin a length away in third. After the race Noseda commented "I saw the betting but she is a free filly, she likes to get on with the job. She has no malice and there is nothing wrong with her, she is just exuberant. She worked beautifully at Newmarket a couple of weeks ago and then went absolutely fabulously in a blow-out the other day. We came here with plenty of confidence, I've no interest in what the bookmakers thought beforehand."

On 2 October, Carry On Katie was moved up to Group One class for the Cheveley Park Stakes at Newmarket Racecourse and started 13/8 favourite against nine opponents. Badminton was again in the field, but her stiffest competition appeared to come from the French-trained Much Faster (winner of the Prix du Bois and Prix Robert Papin) and the John Gosden-trained Nyramba (Dick Poole Fillies' Stakes). The other runners included Ruby Rocket (Firth of Clyde Stakes), China Eyes (runner-up in the Flying Childers Stakes), Voile (third in the Princess Margaret Stakes) and Majestic Desert (third to Attraction in the Queen Mary Stakes and winner of a valuable sales race in Ireland). After her antics before the start at York, Carry On Katie was led down to the start fifteen minutes before the other fillies. The favourite took the lead after two furlongs and stayed on well under pressure in the closing stages to win by a short head from Majestic Desert with Badminton a length and three quarters back in third. After the race she was made favourite for the following year's 1000 Guineas and Dettori commented "She switched off in the race and was fighting all the way, which are good signs for her getting a mile. This filly has the talent to be a very serious contender next year."

At the end of the year the filly joined the Godolphin team with her training being handled by Saeed bin Suroor.

=== 2004: three-year-old season ===
Carry on Katie spent the winter in Dubai, where she had an unusual training regime, working alone with her pony companion rather than galloping against other horses. It was decided that on her return to Britain she would not contest any of the early season trials and go straight for the 1000 Guineas. Godolphin's racing manager Simon Crisford explained "she is the type of filly you want to catch first time and that would send her back. She might give a career-best effort in the trial and we want a career-best effort in the Guineas".

On her first public appearance in the Godolphin colours Carry On Katie started the 7/1 fourth choice in the betting for the 191st running of the 1000 Guineas over the Rowley Mile at Newmarket on 2 May. She stayed on in the closing stages without ever looking likely to win and finished sixth of the sixteen runners behind Attraction. Two weeks later she was sent to France and started 7/2 second favourite in the Poule d'Essai des Pouliches over 1600 metres at Longchamp Racecourse. Dettori sent her into the lead from the start, but after maintaining her advantage until 400 metres from the finish she weakened quickly and finished ninth behind Torrestrella.

== Breeding record ==
Carry On Katie was retired from racing to become a broodmare for Sheikh Mohammed's Darley Stud. She has not been a success as a dam of winners with her first six foals recording a total of three minor wins from 79 attempts. In November 2015 she was auctioned at the Goffs sale in Ireland and was sold for €80,000 to the Tally-Ho Stud.

- Charles Dickens, a bay colt, foaled in 2006, sired by Cape Cross. Failed to win in four races.
- Capacity, bay colt (later gelded), 2007, by Cape Cross. Failed to win in 25 races.
- Circus Act, bay colt (later gelded), 2006, by Cape Cross. Failed to win in 15 races.
- Vocational, bay filly, 2009, by Exceed and Excel. Won two of her 24 races.
- Sandys Row, bay filly, 2010, by Street Cry. Won one race from eleven starts.
- Minola, filly, 2011, by Street Cry. Unraced.
- Sunbreak, bay colt (later gelded), 2015, by Dawn Approach. Won two of his 13 races.
- Opportune Moment, bay colt (later gelded), 2016. Failed to win in two races.
- Call Me Katie, bay filly, 2017, by Kodiac. Failed to win in six races.

== Pedigree ==
Pedigree of Carry On Katie (USA), brown mare, 2001
| Sire Fasliyev (USA) 1997 | Nureyev (USA); 1977 | Northern Dancer | Nearctic |
| Sire Fasliyev (USA) 1997 | Nureyev (USA); 1977 | Northern Dancer | Natalma |
| Sire Fasliyev (USA) 1997 | Nureyev (USA); 1977 | Special | Forli |
| Sire Fasliyev (USA) 1997 | Nureyev (USA); 1977 | Special | Thong |
| Sire Fasliyev (USA) 1997 | Mr P's Princess (USA); 1993 | Mr. Prospector | Raise a Native |
| Sire Fasliyev (USA) 1997 | Mr P's Princess (USA); 1993 | Mr. Prospector | Gold Digger |
| Sire Fasliyev (USA) 1997 | Mr P's Princess (USA); 1993 | Anne Campbell | Never Bend |
| Sire Fasliyev (USA) 1997 | Mr P's Princess (USA); 1993 | Anne Campbell | Repercussion |
| Dam Dinka Raja (USA) 1995 | Woodman (USA); 1983 | Mr. Prospector | Raise a Native |
| Dam Dinka Raja (USA) 1995 | Woodman (USA); 1983 | Mr. Prospector | Gold Digger |
| Dam Dinka Raja (USA) 1995 | Woodman (USA); 1983 | Playmate | Buckpasser |
| Dam Dinka Raja (USA) 1995 | Woodman (USA); 1983 | Playmate | Intriguing |
| Dam Dinka Raja (USA) 1995 | Miss Profile (IRE); 1990 | Sadler's Wells | Northern Dancer |
| Dam Dinka Raja (USA) 1995 | Miss Profile (IRE); 1990 | Sadler's Wells | Fairy Bridge |
| Dam Dinka Raja (USA) 1995 | Miss Profile (IRE); 1990 | Katie May | Busted |
| Dam Dinka Raja (USA) 1995 | Miss Profile (IRE); 1990 | Katie May | Cawston's Pride (Family: 4-n) |

- Carry On Katie is inbred 3 × 3 to Mr. Prospector, meaning that this stallion appears twice in the third generation of her pedigree. She is also inbred 3 × 4 to Northern Dancer.
