= Cawston's Pride =

British-bred Thoroughbred racehorse (1968–1976)

- Sire: Con Brio
- Grandsire: Ribot
- Dam: Cawston Tower
- Damsire: Maharaj Kumar
- Sex: Mare
- Foaled: 1968
- Country: United Kingdom
- Colour: Chestnut
- Breeder: Len Hall
- Owner: Len Hall
- Trainer: Freddie Maxwell
- Record: 10: 9-0-0

Major wins
- Queen Mary Stakes (1970); Molecomb Stakes (1970); Lowther Stakes (1970); Cornwallis Stakes (1970); Ascot 1000 Guineas Trial (1971)

Awards
- Top-rated British two-year-old filly (1970); Timeform top-rated two-year-old filly (1970); Timeform rating 131

Cawston's Pride (1968 – 2 June 1976) was a British Thoroughbred racehorse and broodmare. In 1970, she was unbeaten in eight races including the Queen Mary Stakes, Molecomb Stakes, Lowther Stakes and Cornwallis Stakes and was recognised as the outstanding juvenile filly of her generation. After winning Britain's first ever Group race, the Ascot 1000 Guineas Trial, on her debut as a three-year-old she developed temperament problems and was beaten when favourite for the 1000 Guineas. She refused to race on her only subsequent appearance and was retired to stud. She made an exceptional start as a broodmare, producing four stakes winners, including the champion sprinter Solinus, from four foals before dying at the age of eight in 1976. Cawston's Pride has been retrospectively rated the best two-year-old filly trained in Britain in the second half of the 20th century.

== Background ==
Cawston's Pride was a tall, powerful chestnut mare with a narrow white blaze bred by her owner Len Hall at his stud near Rugby in Warwickshire. She was sired by Con Brio, a son of Ribot, who stood as a stallion in Europe before being exported to Argentina in 1967. Her dam, Cawston Tower won six races over sprint distances and produced several other winners. Hall sent the filly into training with Wiliam Farnham "Freddie" Maxwell at Lambourn in Berkshire. Up to that time, Maxwell was best known as a trainer of stayers, having won the Ascot Gold Cup with Pandofell and Fighting Charlie.

== Racing career ==
=== 1970: two-year-old season ===
As a two-year-old, Cawston's Pride ran eight times, with all of her races being over the minimum distance of five furlongs. In the spring of 1970 she won the St Anne's Stakes, the Cucumber Stakes and the George Lambton Stakes before being moved up in class for the Queen Mary Stakes at Royal Ascot in June. Ridden as in all her major races by Brian Taylor, she started at odds of 2/1 and won by six lengths from Areola. In July she won the Star Fillies' Stakes and the Molecomb Stakes at Goodwood Racecourse, starting at odds of 1/5 in the latter race.

By August few owners were willing to test their fillies against Cawston's Pride, and she won the Lowther Stakes at York Racecourse at odds of 8/100 against a single opponent. In October, she was matched against colts in the Cornwallis Stakes at Ascot Racecourse. She started 4/5 favourite and won from Mummy's Pet, a colt who had won the Norfolk Stakes at Royal Ascot and finished second to Brigadier Gerard in the Middle Park Stakes.

=== 1971: three-year-old season ===
On her three-year-old debut, Cawston's Pride was moved up in distance for the Ascot 1,000 Guineas Trial Stakes, the first Group race run in Britain or Ireland under the newly inaugurated Pattern race system. She won the race from the future Irish 1,000 Guineas winner Favoletta with Super Honey in third place. Cawston's Pride started 6/4 favourite for the 1000 Guineas over the Rowley Mile course at Newmarket Racecourse at the end of April. Her behaviour delayed the race as she refused to go to the start and eventually had to be led down by a Welsh cob pony ridden by Jimmy Lindley. In the race she started well and looked a likely winner, but she began to swish her tail and refused to go through with her run, finishing fifth of the ten runners behind Altesse Royale, who won from Super Honey.

Cawston's Pride was then brought back to sprint distances for the King's Stand Stakes at Royal Ascot. Her temperament again came to the fore as she refused to start in the race won by Amber Rama.

== Assessment ==
In the 1970 Free Handicap, a rating of the best two-year-olds to have raced in Britain, Cawston's Pride was the top-rated filly on 130 pounds, the same as Brigadier Gerard and just behind the leading colts Mill Reef (132) and My Swallow (133). Timeform rated her on 131, making her the best two-year-old filly and the best female racehorse of any age. In their book, A Century of Champions, based on the Timeform rating system, John Randall and Tony Morris rated Cawston's Pride the fourth-best British or Irish two-year-old filly of the 20th century, after Pretty Polly, Mumtaz Mahal and Sun Chariot.

== Stud record ==
Cawston's Pride was retired from racing to become a broodmare. In four seasons at stud she produced four foals, all of whom won races:

- Katie May (brown filly, foaled in 1973, sired by Busted), won two races, third in the Nell Gwyn Stakes. She produced Grise Mine (Prix Saint-Alary) and Kostroma and was female-line ancestor of Carry On Katie
- Cawston's Clown (bay colt, 1974, by Comedy Star), won Coventry Stakes
- Solinus (bay colt, 1975, by Comedy Star), won Coventry Stakes, Anglesey Stakes, July Cup, King's Stand Stakes, William Hill Sprint Championship
- Man of Vision (chestnut colt, 1976, by Never Say Die), won two races, second in the King Edward VII Stakes, exported to Japan

Cawston's Pride died of a twisted gut on 2 June 1976 at the Castle Hyde Stud in County Cork, Ireland.

== Pedigree ==
Pedigree of Cawston's Pride (GB), chestnut mare 1968
Sire Con Brio (GB) 1961	Ribot (GB); 1952	Tenerani	Bellini
Sire Con Brio (GB) 1961	Ribot (GB); 1952	Tenerani	Tofanella
Sire Con Brio (GB) 1961	Ribot (GB); 1952	Romanella	El Greco
Sire Con Brio (GB) 1961	Ribot (GB); 1952	Romanella	Barbara Burrini
Sire Con Brio (GB) 1961	Petronella (GB); 1955	Petition	Fair Trial
Sire Con Brio (GB) 1961	Petronella (GB); 1955	Petition	Art Paper
Sire Con Brio (GB) 1961	Petronella (GB); 1955	Dance d'Espoir	Umidwar
Sire Con Brio (GB) 1961	Petronella (GB); 1955	Dance d'Espoir	Coppelia
Dam Cawston Tower (GB) 1956	Maharaj Kumar (GB); 1943	Stardust	Hyperion
Dam Cawston Tower (GB) 1956	Maharaj Kumar (GB); 1943	Stardust	Sister Stella
Dam Cawston Tower (GB) 1956	Maharaj Kumar (GB); 1943	Pancha	Gold Bridge
Dam Cawston Tower (GB) 1956	Maharaj Kumar (GB); 1943	Pancha	Diomedia
Dam Cawston Tower (GB) 1956	Silver Ribbon (GB); 1949	The Satrap	The Tetrarch
Dam Cawston Tower (GB) 1956	Silver Ribbon (GB); 1949	The Satrap	Scotch Gift
Dam Cawston Tower (GB) 1956	Silver Ribbon (GB); 1949	Salmonella	King Salmon
Dam Cawston Tower (GB) 1956	Silver Ribbon (GB); 1949	Salmonella	Bucella (Family: 4-n)
