= Lochnager =

British-bred Thoroughbred racehorse

- Sire: Dumbarnie
- Grandsire: Dante
- Dam: Miss Barbara
- Damsire: Le Dieu d'Or
- Sex: Stallion
- Foaled: 4 March 1972
- Country: United Kingdom
- Colour: Brown
- Breeder: E A Dandy
- Owner: Charles Spence
- Trainer: Mick Easterby
- Record: 16:9-2-1

Major wins
- Temple Stakes (1976); King's Stand Stakes (1976); July Cup (1976); William Hill Sprint Championship (1976)

Awards
- Timeform rating 88 (1974), 120 (1975), 132 (1976); Timeform Best Sprinter (1976)

Lochnager (4 March 1972 – 1994) was a British Thoroughbred racehorse and sire. A specialist sprinter, he raced mainly in the North of England winning nine of his sixteen starts and was regarded as the best horse in Europe over sprint distances in 1976. He won one minor race as a two-year-old but made relentless progress when campaigned in handicap races in 1975, winning several valuable events. He emerged as a top-class performer as a four-year-old, establishing himself as the year's best sprinter with a run of four successive wins in the Temple Stakes, King's Stand Stakes, July Cup and William Hill Sprint Championship. He made little impact at stud, but was the damsire of Lochsong.

== Background ==
Lochnager was a big, powerful brown horse bred in England by E A Dandy. He was by far the best horse sired by Dumbarnie (a son of the Derby winner Dante) who won several races at sprint distances and was placed in the Gimcrack Stakes and the Diadem Stakes in the early 1950s. Lochnager's dam Miss Barbara did not come from a particularly distinguished family but won six races.

As a foal Lochnager was sold for a "modest sum" to Charles Spence. The colt was sent into training with Mick Easterby at his stable near Sheriff Hutton in North Yorkshire. In his early life his size and strength meant that he was viewed as a potential National Hunt horse. Lochnager was ridden in most of his races by the leading northern jockey Edward Hide.

== Racing career ==
=== 1974: two-year-old season ===
As a two-year-old, Lochnager raced exclusively over the minimum distances of five furlongs. After finishing second on his debut and unplaced on his next start he contested the Studley Stakes, a minor event at Thirsk Racecourse in August. Racing against eight opponents, he recorded his first success, beating Bello Baletta by one and a half lengths. In September, over the same course and distance, he was matched against better opposition and finished fourth.

=== 1975: three-year-old season ===
As a three-year-old, Lochnager made steady improvement throughout the season as he competed in handicap races. After finishing unplaced on his seasonal debut he won the Bass Apprentices Handicap over five furlongs at Haydock Park. He then beat Walk By by three lengths in the Finch Decanter Handicap over the same distance at Ascot Racecourse, ridden by Ernie Johnson and carrying a weight of 106 pounds. On his next appearance he was up in distance to six furlongs for the Northumberland Sprint Trophy at Newcastle and winning by a length from the Stewards' Cup-winner Import. When starting favourite for the Ayr Gold Cup in September he finished third, beaten a short head and half a length by Roman Warrior (who carried top weight of 140 pounds) and Import. On his final appearance of the season Lochnager carried a weight of 125 pounds in the Bovis Handicap over five furlongs at Ascot. He looked "magnificent" before the race and dominated the race to win "very impressively" by three lengths from Import.

=== 1976: four-year-old season ===
Lochnager began his third season by finishing fifth in a handicap at York and then finished second over the same distance in a minor at Thirsk but was never beaten again. In May was moved up in class to contest his first Group race, the Temple Stakes over five furlongs at Sandown Park Racecourse. Matched against Roman Warrior at level weights he started at odds of 5/1 and produced his best performance up to that time taking the lead approaching the final furlong and drawing away to win by two lengths. Lochnager then started the 6/4 favourite in a field of thirteen runners for the King's Stand Stakes at Royal Ascot after being backed down from 5/2 in "one of the biggest gambles seen at Ascot for years" and produced another impressive performance. He was among the leaders from the start, opened up a clear advantage and held the late challenge of the French-trained filly Realty to win by three-quarters of a length. Timeform described his victory as a "sparkling display". Remembering the race in 2002, Mick Easterby, speaking his distinctive Yorkshire dialect said "Lochnager was such a good 'oss and so strongly fancied, I don't think I've ever been so nervous before a race. I couldn't stop sweatin', just thinking about it. The one thing I told [Hide], over and over again, was not to come too soon. Lochnager was an 'oss with all the gears. What made him so brilliant was that he was so switched off - he'd pick grass on't side of a gallop at home while others galloped past him. But when you asked him to pick up in a race, he was like a Ferrari in overdrive, he had an unbelievable burst of speed. I couldn't watch t'race from the stands. I ended up watching it from t'weighing room ... I've never had an 'oss like him and never seen a better sprinter. He was a machine." He also recalled that he was reprimanded by the racecourse stewards for failing to wear appropriate dress as he appeared at the course in his usual suit and trilby.

Lochnager was moved up in distance for the Group One July Cup over six furlongs at Newmarket Racecourse. He was heavily supported in the ante-post betting but his odds drifted out to 3/1 following rumours that he was not at his best. As in Lochnager's last two races, Hide sent the colt to the front approaching the final furlong and won decisively, holding off challenges from Three Legs (winner of that year's Duke of York Stakes) and Import (Wokingham Stakes) to win by three-quarters of a length and a neck. After the race Easterby was somewhat critical of Hide, offering the opinion that the horse would be better suited to more exaggerated waiting tactics. In August, Lochnager returned to five furlongs and started the 4/5 favourite for the William Hill Sprint Championship (formerly known as the Nunthorpe Stakes) at York Racecourse. Having already beaten most of his opponents he was expected to win easily, but after taking the lead a furlong out he had to be driven out by Hide to prevail by half a length from Faliraki with the 100/1 outsider Polly Peachum (also trained by Easterby) a neck away in third. Lochnager's win made him the first horse to complete the King's Stand-July Cup-Nunthorpe treble since Abernant in 1949.

It was expected that Lochnager would end his career in the Prix de l'Abbaye at Longchamp Racecourse in October but he was withdrawn from the race. It was believed that his trainer did not wish to run him on the prevailing soft ground.

== Assessment ==
Lochnager was not rated in the 1974 Free Handicap, a listing of the best two-year-olds to race in the United Kingdom. In their annual Racehorses of 1974, the independent Timeform organisation gave him a rating of 88, forty-six pounds below their top-rated two-year-old Grundy. Lochnager's Timeform rating improved to 120 pounds in 1975, fourteen pounds behind their Best Sprinter Flirting Around and seventeen behind their Horse of the Year Grundy. The official British handicapper rated him fourteen pounds inferior to Grundy, making him the seventeenth best three-year-old colt of his generation in the United Kingdom. At the end of 1976 he was rated 132 by Timeform, three pounds behind their Horse of the Year Youth and was named their Best Sprinter of the season. In their annual Racehorses of 1976 Timeform described him as an outstanding sprinter and bemoaned the fact that he had received few votes in the British Horse of the Year poll won by Pawneese. In the official British handicap for older horses he was rated second, level with Bruni and two pounds below the French-trained stayer Sagaro.

== Stud record ==
Lochnager was retired from racing at the end of the 1976 season with a valuation of £260,000 and became a breeding stallion at the Easthorpe Hall Stud, near Malton, North Yorkshire.

He was not a successful sire of winners, but did get some fast horses including Reesh (winner of the Palace House Stakes, Temple Stakes and Greenlands Stakes) and Imperial Jade (placed in the Lowther Stakes and Palace House Stakes). His most important offspring however, was the filly Peckitt's Well who produced the outstanding racemare Lochsong who was twice named Cartier Champion Sprinter and was voted Cartier Horse of the Year in 1993.

== Pedigree ==
Pedigree of Lochnager (GB), brown stallion, 1972
| Sire Dumbarnie (GB) 1949 | Dante (GB); 1942 | Nearco | Pharos |
| Sire Dumbarnie (GB) 1949 | Dante (GB); 1942 | Nearco | Nogara |
| Sire Dumbarnie (GB) 1949 | Dante (GB); 1942 | Rosy Legend | Dark Legend |
| Sire Dumbarnie (GB) 1949 | Dante (GB); 1942 | Rosy Legend | Rosy Cheeks |
| Sire Dumbarnie (GB) 1949 | Lost Soul (GB); 1931 | Solario | Gainsborough |
| Sire Dumbarnie (GB) 1949 | Lost Soul (GB); 1931 | Solario | Sun Worship |
| Sire Dumbarnie (GB) 1949 | Lost Soul (GB); 1931 | Orlass | Orby |
| Sire Dumbarnie (GB) 1949 | Lost Soul (GB); 1931 | Orlass | Simon Lass |
| Dam Miss Barbara (GB) 1961 | Le Dieu d'Or (GB); 1952 | Petition | Fair Trial |
| Dam Miss Barbara (GB) 1961 | Le Dieu d'Or (GB); 1952 | Petition | Art Paper |
| Dam Miss Barbara (GB) 1961 | Le Dieu d'Or (GB); 1952 | Gilded Bee | Gold Bridge |
| Dam Miss Barbara (GB) 1961 | Le Dieu d'Or (GB); 1952 | Gilded Bee | Lady Buzzer |
| Dam Miss Barbara (GB) 1961 | Barbarona (GB); 1947 | Punt Gun | Roar |
| Dam Miss Barbara (GB) 1961 | Barbarona (GB); 1947 | Punt Gun | Lily Willy |
| Dam Miss Barbara (GB) 1961 | Barbarona (GB); 1947 | Bessarona | Thyestes |
| Dam Miss Barbara (GB) 1961 | Barbarona (GB); 1947 | Bessarona | Obscure (Family 20-b) |
