= Kirrane =

Kirrane is an Irish surname. Notable people with the surname include:

- Danny Kirrane, British actor
- Jack Kirrane (1928–2016), American ice hockey player
- Sean Kirrane (born 2000), Irish jockey
