= La Tendresse =

British-bred Thoroughbred racehorse

- Sire: Grey Sovereign
- Grandsire: Nasrullah
- Dam: Isetta
- Damsire: Morland
- Sex: Mare
- Foaled: 1959
- Country: United Kingdom
- Colour: Bay
- Breeder: Frank Tuthill
- Owner: Pansy Parker Poe
- Trainer: Paddy Prendergast
- Record: 9:6-2-0

Major wins
- Seaton Delaval Stakes (1961); Molecomb Stakes (1961); Lowther Stakes (1961); King George Stakes (1962)

Awards
- Top-rated two-year-old in Britain (1961); Timeform top-rated two-year-old (1961); Timeform rating 135 (1961)

La Tendresse (1959–1972) was a British-bred Irish-trained Thoroughbred racehorse and broodmare. Regarded as one of the fastest two-year-old fillies to race in Britain and Ireland she won five races in 1961 including the Molecomb Stakes and the Lowther Stakes, and was rated the best European juvenile of either sex. She was less dominant as a three-year-old, but did win the King George Stakes at Goodwood. After her retirement from racing she had some success as a broodmare.

== Background ==
La Tendresse was a bay filly with no white markings bred in Britain by the Irish breeder Frank Tuthill. Her sire, Grey Sovereign, a son of Nasrullah, won the Richmond Stakes in 1950 before becoming a successful breeding stallion. Her dam, Isetta, never won a race, but was a good broodmare who went on to produce the Coronation Cup winner I Say.

La Tendresse was brought back to Europe and in September 1960 she was offered for sale at Doncaster where she was bought for 4,800 guineas by the Irish trainer Paddy Prendergast, acting on behalf of Pansy Parker Poe. Prendergast, who had built a reputation for handling precocious juveniles such as Windy City and Floribunda, trained the filly at his stables at the Curragh, County Kildare.

== Racing career ==
=== 1961: two-year-old season ===
La Tendresse ran six times as a two-year-old in 1961 and won five races, all of them over the minimum distance of five furlongs. She won two races in Ireland, one at the Curragh where she won by a margin of six lengths, but failed on her first run in England for the Lily Agnes Stakes when she was unsuited by the very soft ground at Chester in May and finished second by five lengths to Sir Percy Loraine's colt Rescind.

The filly returned to England in the summer and won her three remaining races without being seriously challenged. In July she ran against colts in the Seaton Delaval Stakes at Newcastle Racecourse and won by four lengths from Gay Mairi. At Goodwood Racecourse at the end of the month she was even more impressive when she was ridden by the Australian jockey Ron Hutchinson to win the Molecomb Stakes "in a canter" by six lengths from Alpine Scent. In August at York Racecourse she produced her best performance in the Lowther Stakes. Starting the 2/7 favourite she accelerated clear of her opponents to win by twelve lengths with Alpine Scent again finishing second. La Tendresse developed a cough in early October and was withdrawn from competition in the Cornwallis Stakes at Ascot.

=== 1962: three-year-old season ===
In 1962 La Tendresse was not trained for the classics, being kept instead to sprint races over five furlongs. At Royal Ascot in June she ran in the King's Stand Stakes in which she finished second to the Vincent O'Brien-trained filly Cassarate. Her only success came at Goodwood a month later when she won the King George Stakes, beating Nerium and Caerphilly.

== Assessment ==
Until the British, Irish and French handicappers collaborated to produce the first International Classification in 1977, each country produced its own ratings of the best two-year-olds. In the British Free Handicap for 1961, La Tendresse was the top-rated two-year-old of either sex, four pounds clear of her stable companion Display and six ahead of the leading colt Miralgo. The independent Timeform organisation assigned La Tendresse a figure of 135, making the highest rated European two-year-old of either sex.

In their book A Century of Champions, based on a modified version of the Timeform system, John Randall and Tony Morris rated La Tendresse the sixth best British or Irish-trained two-year-old filly of the 20th century.

== Breeding record ==
La Tendresse was retired from racing to become a broodmare. Her most notable offspring was Prince Tenderfoot, a colt sired by Blue Prince who won the Coventry Stakes in 1969 and became a successful sire of winners. La Tendresse died at the age of thirteen in 1972.

== Pedigree ==
Pedigree of La Tendresse (GB), bay mare, 1959
Sire Grey Sovereign (GB) 1948	Nasrullah (GB); 1940	Nearco	Pharos
Sire Grey Sovereign (GB) 1948	Nasrullah (GB); 1940	Nearco	Nogara
Sire Grey Sovereign (GB) 1948	Nasrullah (GB); 1940	Mumtaz Begum	Blenheim
Sire Grey Sovereign (GB) 1948	Nasrullah (GB); 1940	Mumtaz Begum	Mumtaz Mahal
Sire Grey Sovereign (GB) 1948	Kong (GB); 1933	Baytown	Achtoi
Sire Grey Sovereign (GB) 1948	Kong (GB); 1933	Baytown	Princess Herodias
Sire Grey Sovereign (GB) 1948	Kong (GB); 1933	Clang	Hainault
Sire Grey Sovereign (GB) 1948	Kong (GB); 1933	Clang	Vibration
Dam Isetta (GB) 1943	Morland (GB); 1934	Gainsborough	Bayardo
Dam Isetta (GB) 1943	Morland (GB); 1934	Gainsborough	Rosedrop
Dam Isetta (GB) 1943	Morland (GB); 1934	Lichen	Manna
Dam Isetta (GB) 1943	Morland (GB); 1934	Lichen	Loweswater
Dam Isetta (GB) 1943	Isolda (FR); 1933	Rustom Pasha	Son-in-Law
Dam Isetta (GB) 1943	Isolda (FR); 1933	Rustom Pasha	Cos
Dam Isetta (GB) 1943	Isolda (FR); 1933	Yveline	Gardefeu
Dam Isetta (GB) 1943	Isolda (FR); 1933	Yveline	Photime (Family:8-c)
