= 2004 1000 Guineas =

191st 1000 Guineas Stakes
- 1000 Guineas
- Location: Newmarket Racecourse
- Date: 2 May 2004
- Winning horse: Attraction (GB)
- Jockey: Kevin Darley
- Trainer: Mark Johnston (GB)
- Owner: 10th Duke of Roxburghe

The 2004 1000 Guineas Stakes was a horse race held at Newmarket Racecourse on Sunday 2 May 2004. It was the 191st running of the 1000 Guineas.

The winner was Guy Innes-Ker, 10th Duke of Roxburghe's Attraction, a bay filly trained by Mark Johnston at Middleham, North Yorkshire and ridden by Kevin Darley. Attraction's victory was the first in the race for her owner, trainer and jockey.

== The contenders ==
The race attracted a field of sixteen runners, fifteen trained in the United Kingdom and one in Ireland: there were no challengers from continental Europe. The favourite was the Cheveley Park Stud's Red Bloom, the winner of the Group One Fillies' Mile at Ascot. The second choice in the betting was Attraction, who had been named European Champion Two-year old Filly in 2003 when she had won the Queen Mary Stakes and the Cherry Hinton Stakes but who had been off the racecourse for almost ten months. The Irish challenger was the Aidan O'Brien-trained Necklace, the winner of the Moyglare Stud Stakes and the Debutante Stakes. The Godolphin Racing stable was represented by Carry On Katie, the winner of the Cheveley Park Stakes and the Lowther Stakes as well as the Rockfel Stakes winner Cairns and the Japanese-bred Sundrop. The other contenders included Hathrah (Masaka Stakes), Silca's Gift (Nell Gwyn Stakes) and Majestic Desert (Fred Darling Stakes). Red Bloom headed the betting at odds of 4/1 ahead of Attraction (11/2) and Hathrah (6/1) with Secret Charm and Carry On Katie on 7/1 and Necklace on 8/1.

== The race ==
Shortly after the start, most of the fillies moved to the far side of the wide Newmarket straight (the right side of the course from the jockey's point of view), with only Sundrop and the 33/1 outsider Spotlight racing down the centre. Attraction took the lead on the far side and set the pace with Hathrah, Carry On Katie, Majestic Desert, Cairns and Necklace close behind. A furlong from the finish, Attraction began to come under pressure as Red Bloom moved forward and Secret Charm, who had struggled to obtained a clear run also began to make progress. Attraction stayed on "gamely" in the closing stages to win by half a length from Sundrop with Hathrah a further half a length away in third place. Red Bloom took third ahead of Secret Charm and Carry On Katie.

After the race Attraction's trainer Mark Johnston said: "She doesn't have the most perfect physical confirmation in the world, but believe me, there are a lot worse horses than her. She is a champion two-year-old, the best in Europe, and now she is a Classic winner. She didn't just win that, she galloped and stayed all the way to the line. I am thrilled to see it happen. Everybody put doubts in my mind about her stamina, but really I never doubted her".

== Race details ==
- Sponsor: ultimatebet.com
- First prize: £187,195
- Surface: Turf
- Going: Good
- Distance: 8 furlongs
- Number of runners: 16
- Winner's time: 1:36.78

== Full result ==
Pos.	Marg.	Horse (bred)	Jockey	Trainer (Country)	Odds
1		Attraction (GB)	Kevin Darley	Mark Johnston (GB)	11/2
2	½	Sundrop (JPN)	Kerrin McEvoy	Saeed bin Suroor (GB)	16/1
3	½	Hathrah (IRE)	Richard Hills	John Dunlop (GB)	6/1
4	1¼	Red Bloom (GB)	Kieren Fallon	Michael Stoute (GB)	4/1 fav
5	½	Secret Charm (IRE)	Michael Hills	Barry Hills (GB)	14/1
6	hd	Carry On Katie (USA)	Frankie Dettori	Saeed bin Suroor (GB)	7/1
7	1¼	Nataliya (GB)	Seb Sanders	John Dunlop (GB)	20/1
8	nk	Silca's Gift (GB)	Ted Durcan	Mick Channon (GB)	16/1
9	hd	Majestic Desert (GB)	Darryll Holland	Mick Channon (GB)	7/1
10	2½	Cairns (UAE)	John Carroll	Saeed bin Suroor (GB)	25/1
11	2	Kelucia (IRE)	J. F. Egan	Jim Goldie (GB)	100/1
12	¾	Necklace (GB)	Johnny Murtagh	Aidan O'Brien (IRE)	8/1
13	2½	Valjarv (IRE)	Tom McLaughlin	Nick Littmoden (GB)	200/1
14	3	Incheni (IRE)	Steve Drowne	Geoff Wragg (GB)	25/1
15	1½	Jath (GB)	Neil Callan	Julian Poulton (GB)	100/1
16	shd	Spotlight (GB)	Eddie Ahern	John Dunlop (GB)	33/1

- Abbreviations: nse = nose; nk = neck; shd = head; hd = head; dist = distance; UR = unseated rider; DSQ = disqualified; PU = pulled up

== Winner's details ==
Further details of the winner, Attraction

- Foaled: 19 February 2001
- Country: Scotland
- Sire: Efisio; Dam: Flirtation (Pursuit of Love)
- Owner: 10th Duke of Roxburghe
- Breeder: Floors Farming
