= Fasliyev =

American-bred Thoroughbred racehorse

- Racing silks of Michael Tabor
- Sire: Nureyev
- Grandsire: Northern Dancer
- Dam: Mr P's Princess
- Damsire: Mr. Prospector
- Sex: Stallion
- Foaled: 9 February 1997
- Country: United States
- Colour: Bay
- Breeder: Harold Harrison
- Owner: Sue Magnier & Michael Tabor
- Trainer: Aidan O'Brien
- Record: 5: 5-0-0
- Earnings: £245,639

Major wins
- Coventry Stakes (1999); Phoenix Stakes (1999); Prix Morny (1999)

Awards
- European Champion Two-Year-Old (1999)
- Last updated on June 21, 2007

Fasliyev (9 February 1997 – 9 July 2013) was a Thoroughbred racehorse and active sire who was bred in the United States and trained in Ireland. He was the highest-rated European two-year-old of 1999 and was named European Champion Two-Year-Old at the Cartier Racing Awards. He retired undefeated in five races after suffering a training injury when being prepared for the Dewhurst Stakes. He died in Japan at sixteen years.

== Background ==
Fasliyev was bred in Kentucky by Harold Harrison. Harrison is based in Winder, Georgia, but sends his mares to breed at the Dixiana Farm, near Lexington, Kentucky. Fasilyev was sired by the disqualified 2000 Guineas winner Nureyev out of the Mr. Prospector mare Mr P's Princess. Apart from Fasliyev, Nureyev was the sire the winners of at least forty-five Group One/Grade I including Peintre Celebre, Spinning World, Zilzal, Stravinsky and Wolfhound. His career as a stallion has been described as "outstanding". Mr P's Princess never raced, but was the sister to the top class American winners Menifee and Desert Wine. She also produced Butterfly Cove, the dam of the 2010 European Champion Two-year-old Filly Misty for Me.

Fasliyev was sent by Harrison to the Keeneland sales as a yearling in July 1998. He was bought for $450,000 by the bloodstock agent Dermot "Demi" O'Byrne, acting on behalf of Michael Tabor and the Coolmore organisation.

He was sent into training with Aidan O'Brien at Ballydoyle. He was ridden in all of his races by Michael Kinane.

== Racing career ==
Fasliyev made his debut in a five furlong maiden race at Leopardstown in April. He led from the start, and went clear in the final furlong to win by three lengths from Desert Sky in "impressive" style at odds of 4/7. At The Curragh a month later he was theoretically moved up to Listed class for the Marble Hill Stakes, but the standard of the opposition was very similar, and Fasliyev once again led from the start to beat Desert Sky at by two lengths.

His first real test came at Royal Ascot where he faced several previous winners in an eighteen-runner field for the Group Three Coventry Stakes. The result, however, was much the same, with Fasliyev being sent into the lead by Kinane in the early stages and pulling clear inside the final furlong to win by two and a half lengths from the future Hong Kong Champions Mile winner Red Pepper. According to John Martin in the Irish Independent Faslivev won "more or less as he liked".

In August, Fasliyev established himself as Europe's leading two-year-old with two Group One wins. At Leopardstown he started at odds of 2/7 for the Phoenix Stakes and led from the start to win easily, despite hanging to the left in the closing stages.

Three weeks later he was sent to France for the Prix Morny at Deauville. Only two French colts, including the Prix de Cabourg winner Harbour Island, opposed him, but the challenge was provided by a strong English-trained Godolphin entry including the Group race winners Bachir (Richmond Stakes), Warm Heart (Norfolk Stakes), and City On A Hill (July Stakes). In the early stages, Fasliyev had to dispute the lead with Harbour Island, but took control after a quarter of a mile and in the closing stages he pulled clear. Although Kinane eased the colt down in the final stages he crossed the line four lengths ahead of Warm Heart. The victory was described as "immensely impressive", while John Gosden, the trainer of the runner-up reportedly asked "Was that a three-year-old we were racing against?"

Fasliyev's final start of the season was scheduled to be the Dewhurst Stakes at Newmarket in October. Two days before the race, Fasliyev suffered a fractured pastern when cantering in the paddock at Ballydoyle. Surgery, which involved the insertion of five metal pins into the leg, and intensive veterinary treatment saved the colt's life, but his racing career was over.

== Race record ==
Date	Race	Dist (f)	Course	Class	Prize (£K)	Odds	Runners	Placing	Margin	Time	Jockey	Trainer
18 April 1999	Mick Holly Memorial EBF Maiden	5	Leopardstown	M	6	4/7	8	1	3	0:59.80	Michael Kinane	Aidan O'Brien
22 May 1999	Marble Hill Stakes	5	The Curragh	Listed	17	4/9	7	1	2	0:59.20	Michael Kinane	Aidan O'Brien
15 June 1999	Coventry Stakes	6	Ascot	3	35	15/8	18	1	2.5	1:14.59	Michael Kinane	Aidan O'Brien
8 August 1999	Phoenix Stakes	6	Leopardstown	1	100	2/7	6	1	1.5	1:17.10	Michael Kinane	Aidan O'Brien
22 August 1999	Prix Morny	6	Deauville	1	86	6/5	7	1	4	1:11.00	Michael Kinane	Aidan O'Brien

== Assessment ==
When the International Classification for the two-year-old on 1999 was released in January 2000, Fasliyev was rated the best of his generation in Europe with a rating of 125, five pounds clear of Distant Music and Giant's Causeway.

He had previously been named European Champion Two-year-old Colt at the Cartier Racing Awards.

== Stud career ==
Fasliyev was retired to the Coolmore Stud at Fethard, County Tipperary. In 2007 he was sold to Japanese interests and stood at the Yushun Stallion Station. He died in Japan on 9 July 2013.

Fasliyev has sired the winners of more than four hundred races. His only Group One winner has been Carry On Katie (Cheveley Park Stakes), but his best product has probably been the sprinter Chineur who won the King's Stand Stakes when it was still a Group Two race.

== Pedigree ==
Pedigree of Fasliyev (USA), bay stallion, 1997
Sire Nureyev (USA) 1977	Northern Dancer; 1961	Nearctic	Nearco
Sire Nureyev (USA) 1977	Northern Dancer; 1961	Nearctic	Lady Angela
Sire Nureyev (USA) 1977	Northern Dancer; 1961	Natalma	Native Dancer
Sire Nureyev (USA) 1977	Northern Dancer; 1961	Natalma	Almahmoud
Sire Nureyev (USA) 1977	Special; 1969	Forli	Aristophanes
Sire Nureyev (USA) 1977	Special; 1969	Forli	Trevisa
Sire Nureyev (USA) 1977	Special; 1969	Thong	Nantallah
Sire Nureyev (USA) 1977	Special; 1969	Thong	Rough Shod
Dam Mr P's Princess (USA) 1993	Mr. Prospector; 1970	Raise a Native	Native Dancer
Dam Mr P's Princess (USA) 1993	Mr. Prospector; 1970	Raise a Native	Raise You
Dam Mr P's Princess (USA) 1993	Mr. Prospector; 1970	Gold Digger	Nashua
Dam Mr P's Princess (USA) 1993	Mr. Prospector; 1970	Gold Digger	Sequence
Dam Mr P's Princess (USA) 1993	Anne Campbell; 1973	Never Bend	Nasrullah
Dam Mr P's Princess (USA) 1993	Anne Campbell; 1973	Never Bend	Lalun
Dam Mr P's Princess (USA) 1993	Anne Campbell; 1973	Repercussion	Tatan
Dam Mr P's Princess (USA) 1993	Anne Campbell; 1973	Repercussion	Tomina (Family: 16-h)
