= Dahlia Handicap =

- Class: Grade II
- Location: Hollywood Park Racetrack; Inglewood, California, United States
- Inaugurated: 1982
- Final run: 2008
- Race type: Thoroughbred - Flat racing
- Website: Hollywood Park official website

Race information
- Distance: 1 1/16 miles (8.5 furlongs)
- Surface: Turf
- Track: Left-handed
- Qualification: Fillies & Mares, three-years-old & up
- Weight: Assigned
- Purse: $150,000

The Dahlia Handicap was a race for thoroughbred horses run annually at Hollywood Park Racetrack in Inglewood, California. The Dahlia is open to fillies and mares, age three and up, willing to race one and one-sixteenth miles on the turf. A Grade II was last run in 2008.

The race was run in two divisions in 1982, 1983, 1987, 1989, and 1990. It is named in honor of the National Museum of Racing and Hall of Fame inductee, the great racing mare Dahlia. Born in 1970, died in 2001 at the age of 31, Dahlia won the big races in France, England, the United States, and Canada.

Due to problems with the turf course, in 2004, the race was run on dirt, and as such, for that event was downgraded to a G-III event.

== Records ==
Speed record:

- 1:40.40 - Stylish Star (1989)
- 1:40.40 - Saros Brig (1989)

Most wins:

- No horse has won this race more than once.

Most wins by a trainer:

- 7 - Robert J. Frankel

== Winners since 1999 ==
Year	Winner	Age	Jockey	Trainer	Owner	Time
2008	Vacare	5	Jose Valdivia, Jr.	Christophe Clement	Jon & Sarah Kelly	1:43.17
2007	Citronnade	4	David Flores	Robert J. Frankel	Stronach Stables	1:41.49
2006	Grande Melody	3	Julien Leparoux	Patrick Biancone	H. Joseph Allen	1:40.96
2005	no race					
2004	Festival	5	Danny Sorenson	Paddy Gallagher	Grand Farm	1:42.11
2003	Katdogawn	3	Mike E. Smith	James M. Cassidy	John Cuchna et al.	1:41.52
2002	Tout Charmant (DH)	6	Alex Solis	Ron McAnally	Stonerside Stable	1:44.55
2002	Surya (DH)	4	Pat Valenzuela	Robert J. Frankel	Flaxman Holdings	1:44.55
2001	Verruma	5	Garrett Gomez	James K. Chapman	J. K. Chapman & partners	1:43.24
2000	Follow the Money	4	Victor Espinoza	David Hofmans	Christopher & Patricia Elia	1:40.71
1999	Lady at Peace	3	Garrett Gomez	Julio C. Canani	Jon & Sarah Kelly	1:41.50

== Earlier winners ==
- 1998 - Tuzla
- 1997 - Golden Arches
- 1996 - Sixieme Sens
- 1995 - Fidina
- 1994 - Skimble
- 1993 - Kalita Melody
- 1992 - Kostroma
- 1991 - Re Toss
- 1990 - Petalia
- 1990 - Little Brianne
- 1989 - Stylish Star
- 1989 - Saros Brig
- 1988 - Balbonella
- 1987 - Top Corsage
- 1987 - Invited Guest
- 1986 - Aberuschka
- 1985 - Capricorn Belle
- 1984 - Lina Cavalieri
- 1983 - Geraldines Store
- 1983 - First Advance
- 1982 - Sangue
- 1982 - Milingo
