= Lowther Stakes =

Flat horse race in Britain

- Class: Group 2
- Location: York Racecourse; York, England
- Inaugurated: 1946
- Race type: Flat / Thoroughbred
- Sponsor: Sky Bet
- Website: York

Race information
- Distance: 6f (1,207 metres)
- Surface: Turf
- Track: Straight
- Qualification: Two-year-old fillies
- Weight: 9 st 0 lb Penalties; 3 lb for G1 / G2 winners
- Purse: £250,000 (2025); 1st: £141,775

Lowther Stakes
2026
Libertango	Star Of State	Jolivette

Previous years
2025
Royal Fixation	America Queen	Staya
2024
Celandine	Time For Sandals	Leovanni
2023
Relief Rally	Cherry Blossom	Symbology
2022
Swingalong	Queen Me	Matilda Picotte
2021
Zain Claudette	Sandrine	Desert Dreamer

2020-2011
2020
Miss Amulet	Sacred	Umm Kulthum
2019
Living In The Past	Liberty Beach	Good Vibes
2018
Fairyland	The Mackem Bullet	Queen Jo Jo
2017
Threading	Madeline	Mamba Noire
2016
Queen Kindly	Roly Poly	Fair Eva
2015
Besharah	Lumiere	Easton Angel
2014
Tiggy Wiggy	Cursory Glance	Anthem Alexander
2013
Lucky Kristale	Queen Catrine	Wind Fire
2012
Rosdhu Queen	Baileys Jubilee	Royal Rascal
2011
Best Terms	Fire Lily	Hello Glory

2010-2001
2010
Hooray	Margot Did	Rimth
2009
Lady Of The Desert	Beyond Desire	Dubawi Heights
2008
Infamous Angel	Penny's Gift	Langs Lash
2007
Nahoodh	Fleeting Spirit	Unilateral
2006
Silk Blossom	Indian Ink	Darrfonah
2005
Flashy Wings	La Chunga	Beauty Bright
2004
Soar	Salsa Brava	Spirit of Chester
2003
Carry On Katie	Badminton	Dunloskin
2002
Russian Rhythm	Danaskaya	Romantic Liason
2001
Queen's Logic	Sophisticat	Silent Honor

2000-1991
2000
Enthused	Khulan	Autumnal
1999
Jemima	Seraphina	Tabheej
1998
Bint Allayl	Wannabe Grand	Flanders
1997
Cape Verdi	Embassy	Nadwah
1996
Bianca Nera	Arethusa	Seebe
1995
Dance Sequence	My Melody Parkes	Sweet Robin
1994
Harayir	Gay Gallanta	Warning Star
1993
Velvet Moon	Risky	Mehthaaf
1992
Niche	Shamisen	Toocando
1991
Culture Vulture	Poolesta	Sahara Star

1990-1988
1990
Only Yours	Dangora	Cloche D'Or
1989
Dead Certain	Routilante	Princess Taufan
1988
Miss Demure	Muhbubh	Always On A Sunday

The Lowther Stakes is a Group 2 flat horse race in Great Britain open to two-year-old fillies. It is run at York over a distance of 6 furlongs (1,207 metres) and is scheduled to take place each year in August.

Until 1975 the race was run over a distance of 5 furlongs. A horse running in this "prestigious" race often indicates confidence in the filly's ability and aptitude for improvement.

== History ==
A different event called the Lowther Stakes, a middle-distance race open to horses aged three or older, used to be contested at Newmarket. Its winners included Bay Ronald (1896), Bayardo (1909) and Gay Crusader (1917).

The present version is named in memory of Hugh Lowther (1857–1944), the 5th Earl of Lonsdale. It was established in 1946, and the inaugural running was won by Southernwood.

The Lowther Stakes is currently held on the second day of York's four-day Ebor Festival meeting. The leading horses from the race sometimes go on to compete in the Cheveley Park Stakes and the most recent filly to win both races was Fairyland in 2018.

== Records ==
Leading jockey (3 wins):

- Harry Carr – Woodflower (1947), Gamble in Gold (1950), Dunce Cap (1962)
- Ron Hutchinson – Kathy Too (1960), La Tendresse (1961), Sovereign (1967)
- Lester Piggott – Kittyhawk (1980), Prickle (1983), Niche (1992)
- Richard Hughes - Best Terms (2011), Rosdhu Queen (2012), Tiggy Wiggy (2014)

Leading trainer (5 wins):

- Richard Hannon Sr. – Enstone Spark (1977), Only Yours (1990), Niche (1992), Infamous Angel (2008), Best Terms (2011)

== Winners ==
Year	Winner	Jockey	Trainer	Time
1946	Southernwood	Billy Nevett	Charles Elsey	1:00.40
1947	Woodflower	Harry Carr	Cecil Boyd-Rochfort	0:59.20
1948	Shard Bridge	Tommy Lowrey	Bobby Jones	0:58.40
1949	Corejada	Charlie Elliott	Charles Semblat	0:59.20
1950	Gamble In Gold	Harry Carr	Cecil Boyd-Rochfort	1:00.20
1951	Constantia	Peter Maher	Ryan Jarvis	0:59.40
1952	Royal Duchy	Charlie Elliott	Paddy Prendergast	0:59.60
1953	Crimson	Joe Mercer	Ted Smyth	0:59.00
1954	Our Betters	Charlie Smirke	Harry Thomson Jones	1:07.60
1955	La Fresnes	Doug Smith	George Colling	0:59.60
1956	Pharsalia	Willie Snaith	Hunphrey Cottrill	1:04.80
1957	Liberal Lady	Ken Gethin	Peter Thrale	1:03.40
1958	Fortune's Darling	Stan Clayton	Dick Hern	1:02.00
1959	Queensberry	Eph Smith	John Waugh	0:59.80
1960	Kathy Too	Ron Hutchinson	Paddy Prendergast	0:59.20
1961	La Tendresse	Ron Hutchinson	Paddy Prendergast	0:59.20
1962	Dunce Cap	Harry Carr	Cecil Boyd-Rochfort	1:02.40
1963	Pourparler	Garnie Bougoure	Paddy Prendergast	1:02.00
1964	Pugnacity	Joe Mercer	Walter Wharton	1:05.20
1965	Reet Lass	Brian Connorton	W Gray	1:00.00
1966	Pia	Edward Hide	Bill Elsey	1:01.40
1967	Sovereign	Ron Hutchinson	Harry Wragg	1:05.60
1968	Flying Legs	Frankie Durr	Michael Jarvis	1:03.40
1969	Humble Duty	Duncan Keith	Peter Walwyn	Not taken
1970	Cawston's Pride	Brian Taylor	Freddie Maxwell	1:04.40
1971	Rode Dubarry	Tony Murray	Tom Waugh	1:01.50
1972	Regardia	Jimmy Lindley	Atty Corbett	0:59.50
1973	Bitty Girl	Bruce Raymond	Michael Jarvis	1:01.70
1974	Cry of Truth	John Gorton	Bruce Hobbs	0:58.96
1975	Pasty	Pat Eddery	Peter Walwyn	0:59.39
1976	Icena	Brian Taylor	Harry Thomson Jones	1:15.54
1977	Enstone Spark	Frankie Durr	Richard Hannon Sr.	1:14.92
1978	Devon Ditty	Greville Starkey	Harry Thomson Jones	1:14.18
1979	Mrs Penny	John Matthias	Ian Balding	1:16.11
1980	Kittyhawk	Lester Piggott	Dick Hern	1:15.96
1981	Circus Ring	Walter Swinburn	Michael Stoute	1:14.10
1982	Habibti	Willie Carson	John Dunlop	1:13.01
1983	Prickle	Lester Piggott	Henry Cecil	1:12.24
1984	Al Bahathri	Tony Murray	Harry Thomson Jones	1:10.82
1985	Kingscote	Pat Eddery	Jeremy Tree	1:14.65
1986	Polonia	John Reid	Jim Bolger	1:10.99
1987	Ela Romara	Paul Eddery	Geoff Wragg	1:14.06
1988	Miss Demure	Michael Roberts	Robert Armstrong	1:12.84
1989	Dead Certain	Steve Cauthen	David Elsworth	1:11.54
1990	Only Yours	Bruce Raymond	Richard Hannon Sr.	1:10.68
1991	Culture Vulture	Richard Quinn	Paul Cole	1:12.44
1992	Niche	Lester Piggott	Richard Hannon Sr.	1:11.61
1993	Velvet Moon	Alan Munro	Paul Cole	1:11.82
1994	Harayir	Willie Carson	Dick Hern	1:11.14
1995	Dance Sequence	Walter Swinburn	Michael Stoute	1:11.59
1996	Bianca Nera	Kevin Darley	David Loder	1:10.54
1997	Cape Verdi	John Reid	Peter Chapple-Hyam	1:12.48
1998	Bint Allayl	Michael Kinane	Mick Channon	1:10.92
1999	Jemima	Lindsay Charnock	Tim Easterby	1:14.83
2000	Enthused	Johnny Murtagh	Sir Michael Stoute	1:12.72
2001	Queen's Logic	Steve Drowne	Mick Channon	1:11.01
2002	Russian Rhythm	Kieren Fallon	Sir Michael Stoute	1:11.05
2003	Carry On Katie	Frankie Dettori	Jeremy Noseda	1:10.67
2004	Soar	Johnny Murtagh	James Fanshawe	1:15.90
2005	Flashy Wings	Ted Durcan	Mick Channon	1:10.14
2006	Silk Blossom	Michael Hills	Barry Hills	1:14.82
2007	Nahoodh	Jamie Spencer	Mick Channon	1:12.62
2008 (Note: The 2008 running took place at Newmarket)	Infamous Angel	Eddie Ahern	Richard Hannon Sr.	1:11.65
2009	Lady of the Desert	Martin Dwyer	Brian Meehan	1:09.34
2010	Hooray	Seb Sanders	Sir Mark Prescott	1:10.14
2011	Best Terms	Richard Hughes	Richard Hannon Sr.	1:12.35
2012	Rosdhu Queen	Richard Hughes	William Haggas	1:11.75
2013	Lucky Kristale	Tom Queally	George Margarson	1:10.58
2014	Tiggy Wiggy	Richard Hughes	Richard Hannon Jr.	1:08.90
2015	Besharah	Pat Cosgrave	William Haggas	1:11.87
2016	Queen Kindly	Jamie Spencer	Richard Fahey	1:09.84
2017	Threading	James Doyle	Mark Johnston	1:12.48
2018	Fairyland	Ryan Moore	Aidan O'Brien	1:11.23
2019	Living In The Past	Daniel Tudhope	Karl Burke	1:10.74
2020	Miss Amulet	James Doyle	Ken Condon	1:10.71
2021	Zain Claudette	Ray Dawson	Ismail Mohammed	1:10.46
2022	Swingalong	Clifford Lee	Karl Burke	1:10.80
2023	Relief Rally	Tom Marquand	William Haggas	1:10.89
2024	Celandine	Tom Marquand	Ed Walker	1:10.77
2025	Royal Fixation	William Buick	Ed Walker	1:11.27
2026	Libertango	Billy Loughnane	George Boughey	1:13.66

== See also ==
- Horse racing in Great Britain
- List of British flat horse races
