= Solinus (horse) =

British-bred Thoroughbred racehorse (1975–1979)

- Sire: Comedy Star
- Grandsire: Tom Fool
- Dam: Cawston's Pride
- Damsire: Con Brio
- Sex: Stallion
- Foaled: 18 February 1975
- Country: United Kingdom
- Colour: Bay
- Breeder: Len Hall
- Owner: Danny Schwartz
- Trainer: Vincent O'Brien
- Record: 10:8-2-0

Major wins
- Coventry Stakes (1977); Anglesey Stakes (1977); Ballyogan Stakes (1978); King's Stand Stakes (1978); July Cup (1978); William Hill Sprint Championship (1978)

Awards
- Timeform best sprinter (1978); Timeform rating 124 (1977), 130 (1978)
- Last updated on 21 August 2025

Solinus (18 February 1975 – 1979) was a British-bred, Irish-trained Thoroughbred racehorse and sire. A specialist sprinter, he won eight races over five and six furlongs in a ten-race career which lasted from June 1977 until October 1978. Solinus was a long horse, bay coloured with white socks on his hind feet. As a two-year-old, he won three of his four races, including the Coventry Stakes in England and the Anglesey Stakes in Ireland. In the following year, he was the dominant sprinter in Britain and Ireland, winning the Ballyogan Stakes, King's Stand Stakes, July Cup and William Hill Sprint Championship. He was then retired to stud but died in 1979.

== Background ==
Solinus was a strong, lengthy, good-looking bay horse with a large white snip and white socks on his hind feet, bred by Len Hall at his stud near Rugby, Warwickshire. He was the best horse sired by Comedy Star, an American-bred stallion who raced in England, producing his best effort when finishing second to Brigadier Gerard in the Washington Singer Stakes. Solinus was the third foal of Cawston's Pride, an outstanding filly who won nine of her ten races and had previously produced the Coventry Stakes winner Cawston's Clown (also by Comedy Star).

Solinus was sent to the United States and was consigned to the Saratoga Yearling Sales where he was bought for $75,000 by representatives of California businessman, Danny Schwartz. Solinus was returned to Europe and sent into training with Vincent O'Brien at Ballydoyle in County Kildare.

== Racing career ==
=== 1977: two-year-old season ===
Solinus began his racing career in a maiden race over five furlongs in early June. He started the odds-on favourite and won by eight lengths. Later in the month, he was sent to England and moved up in class for the Group Three Coventry Stakes over six furlongs at Royal Ascot. Ridden by Lester Piggott, he started the 7/4 favourite and won by three lengths from Sharpen Your Eye, having taken the lead shortly after half way. Solinus did not reappear until late August, when he started 4/9 favourite for the Anglesey Stakes at the Curragh in which he was opposed by the Railway Stakes winner Thunor. He won very easily by six lengths from Embee Twist. In September, Solinus went back to England to contest the Champagne Stakes at Doncaster Racecourse. He took the lead and quickened two furlongs from the finish but was overtaken in the closing stages and beaten three quarters of a length by Sexton Blake. Piggott expressed the view that the seven furlong distance was too short for the colt.

=== 1978: three-year-old season ===
Despite Piggott's opinion, Solinus was campaigned exclusively at sprint distances in 1978. He made his first appearance in the Group Three Ballyogan Stakes at Leopardstown Racecourse in early June and started second favourite behind the four-year-old Ballad Rock. Ridden by Tommy Murphy, Solinus disputed the lead from the start and won by a head from Ballad Rock. Three weeks later, Solinus was moved up in class for the Group One King's Stand Stakes over five furlongs at Royal Ascot in which he was ridden by Piggott and started the 4/6 favourite. He took the lead soon after the start and drew away from the field in the final furlong to win by four lengths from the Temple Stakes winner Oscilight. On his next appearance, Solinus started 4/7 favourite for the Group One July Cup over six furlongs at Newmarket Racecourse. In what Timeform described as the best sprint race run in England that year, he took the lead after a furlong, turned back the challenge of Double Form, and held off the late run of the French-trained filly Sanedtki to win by a neck.

At York Racecourse in August, Solinus started the 1/2 favourite for the Group Two William Hill Sprint Championship over five furlongs. He raced lazily, following the filly Smarten Up before taking the lead a furlong from the finish and winning by one and a half lengths. Solinus returned to Ireland in September for the Airlie/Coolmore/Castle Hyde Championships over six furlongs at the Curragh. Despite rumours that he had sustained an injury a day earlier, he started favourite and won easily by three lengths from Spence Bay. In October, Solinus was sent to France for the Prix de l'Abbaye over 1000 metres at Longchamp Racecourse. He started the 6/10 favourite despite an unfavourable draw but was beaten three lengths by the two-year-old French filly Sigy.

== Assessment ==
In the Irish Free Handicap for 1977, Solinus was rated the second best colt of his generation, five pound behind his stable companion Try My Best. The independent Timeform organisation gave Solinus a rating of 124, six pounds behind the champion Try My Best. In the following year, Solinus was rated on 130 by Timeform, who named him the best sprinter of the year. The International Classification placed him eighth among the three-year-old colts of 1978, seven pounds below Ile de Bourbon. Vincent O'Brien described Solinus as the fastest sprinter he had ever trained.

== Stud record ==
Solinus was retired from racing and became a breeding stallion at the Longfield Stud in County Tipperary, having been valued at £800,000 for syndication. He died in 1979 after a single season at stud, with the best of his offspring being the filly Henry's Secret who finished second in the Princess Margaret Stakes and was rated 108 by Timeform in 1982.

== Pedigree ==
Pedigree of Solinus (GB), bay stallion, 1975
Sire Comedy Star (USA) 1968	Tom Fool (USA); 1949	Menow	Pharamond
Sire Comedy Star (USA) 1968	Tom Fool (USA); 1949	Menow	Alcibiades
Sire Comedy Star (USA) 1968	Tom Fool (USA); 1949	Gaga	Bull Dog
Sire Comedy Star (USA) 1968	Tom Fool (USA); 1949	Gaga	Alpoise
Sire Comedy Star (USA) 1968	Latin Walk (USA); 1960	Roman Tread	Roman
Sire Comedy Star (USA) 1968	Latin Walk (USA); 1960	Roman Tread	Stepwisely
Sire Comedy Star (USA) 1968	Latin Walk (USA); 1960	Stall Walker	Bimelech
Sire Comedy Star (USA) 1968	Latin Walk (USA); 1960	Stall Walker	Pansy Walker
Dam Cawston's Pride (GB) 1968	Con Brio (GB); 1961	Ribot	Tenerani
Dam Cawston's Pride (GB) 1968	Con Brio (GB); 1961	Ribot	Romanella
Dam Cawston's Pride (GB) 1968	Con Brio (GB); 1961	Petronella	Petition
Dam Cawston's Pride (GB) 1968	Con Brio (GB); 1961	Petronella	Danse d'Espoir
Dam Cawston's Pride (GB) 1968	Cawston Tower (GB); 1956	Maharaj Kumar	Stardust
Dam Cawston's Pride (GB) 1968	Cawston Tower (GB); 1956	Maharaj Kumar	Pancha
Dam Cawston's Pride (GB) 1968	Cawston Tower (GB); 1956	Silver Ribbon	The Satrap
Dam Cawston's Pride (GB) 1968	Cawston Tower (GB); 1956	Silver Ribbon	Salmonella (Family:4-n)
