= Mick Easterby =

British racehorse trainer

Michael William Easterby (born 30 March 1931) is a British racehorse trainer.

He is a dual-purpose trainer, saddling runners in both flat racing and National Hunt racing. He gained his only Classic winner with Mrs McArdy in the 1977 1,000 Guineas and his major successes have come with Lochnager, winner of the King's Stand Stakes, July Cup and Nunthorpe Stakes in 1976; and Peterhof, winner of the Triumph Hurdle also in 1976. His most recent British Pattern race winner came in the 2007 Winter Derby with Gentleman's Deal.

Mick combines training racehorses with farming and has run a working farm at Sheriff Hutton since the 1950s. Mick runs an annual Point-to-Point on his land at Sheriff Hutton in aid of the Yorkshire Air Ambulance and has raised over £100,000 for this cause.

Mick's late brother, Peter Easterby, was also a racehorse trainer, and his nephew Tim Easterby is an active trainer. Mick's cousin Henry is the father of Irish rugby union internationals Simon and Guy Easterby.
