= Floribunda (horse) =

British-bred Thoroughbred racehorse

- Sire: Princely Gift
- Grandsire: Nasrullah
- Dam: Astrentia
- Damsire: Denturius
- Sex: Stallion
- Foaled: 1958
- Country: United Kingdom
- Colour: Bay
- Breeder: Meg Mullion
- Owner: Meg Mullion
- Trainer: Paddy Prendergast
- Record: 8:5-1-1

Major wins
- New Stakes (1960); King George Stakes (1961); Nunthorpe Stakes (1961)

Awards
- Timeform top-rated two-year-old (1961); Timeform rating 136 (1962)

Floribunda (1958–1979) was a British-bred Irish-trained Thoroughbred racehorse and sire. A specialist sprinter, he won his first three races (including the New Stakes) by wide margins before his two-year-old season was curtailed by injury. In 1961 he was beaten in his first two races before returning to his best to win the King George Stakes and Nunthorpe Stakes. He was retired to stud at the end of the season and had mixed success as a sire of winners.

== Background ==
Floribunda was a dark-coated bay horse with no white markings, bred in Britain by his owner Meg Mullion. Mullion, who owned the Ardenode Stud in partnership with her husband Jim, sent the colt to Ireland to be trained at the Curragh, County Kildare, by Paddy Prendergast, a trainer noted for his handling of precocious two-year-olds. His sire Princely Gift was a leading sprinter who broke the track record at Doncaster Racecourse when carrying 130 pounds in the 1955 Portland Handicap. Floribunda's dam Astrentia also produced his full sister Kew, the great-grand-dam of the Prix de Diane winner Sil Sila.

== Racing career ==
=== 1960: two-year-old season ===
Floribunda began his racing career in Ireland in spring, winning a maiden race at the Curragh Racecourse by twelve lengths. On his next appearance he set a new track record when winning over five furlongs at Phoenix Park. Predergast sent the colt to England in June for the New Stakes, one of the most important two-year-old races at Royal Ascot. Ridden by the Australian jockey Ron Hutchinson he started the 2/7 favourite and won by eight lengths. His "runaway" win led to him being described as the best two-year-old of the season up to that point.

Floribunda returned to England in August when he was stepped up to six furlongs in the Gimcrack Stakes at York. He sustained an injury in the race and finished third behind Test Case. He did not run again that season.

=== 1961: three-year-old season ===
On his first appearance as a three-year-old, Floribunda was tried over seven furlongs in the Tetrarch Stakes at the Curragh, but failed to stay the distance and finished unplaced behind Time Greine. Floribunda returned to sprinting at Royal Ascot in June and showed better form, without looking likely to win, when finishing second to Silver Tor in the King's Stand Stakes.

In July Floribunda returned to England for the King George Stakes at Goodwood Racecourse. Despite having sustained three consecutive defeats he was made 4/6 favourite and won decisively from the filly Cynara with the previous season's leading sprinter Bleep-Bleep in third place. Floribunda's best performance came at York in August when he was ridden by Hutchinson in the Nunthorpe Stakes. He won "in brilliant style" by four lengths from Cynara and Silver Tor. According to John Randall, writing in the Racing Post, the performance established Floribunda as "Ireland's greatest sprinter".

It was expected that Floribunda would run in the Prix de l'Abbaye at Longchamp in October and then stay in training as a four-year-old, but he never ran again and was retired to stud.

== Assessment ==
The independent Timeform organisation rated Floribunda the best two-year-old of 1960 with a rating of 135. The official Free Handicap, however, was topped by the filly Opaline. In the following season, Floribunda improved his Timeform rating to 136, making him the second highest-rated horse in Europe behind the Prix de l'Arc de Triomphe winner Molvedo.

In their book A Century of Champions, based on a modified version of the Timeform system, John Randall and Tony Morris rated Floribunda the best British or Irish-trained horse of his generation. He was also rated the thirteenth-best British or Irish-trained sprinter and the sixteenth-best Irish racehorse of the 20th century.

== Stud career ==
Floribunda retired to stand as a stallion at his owners Ardenode Stud. He had moderate results, the best of his offspring being Princely Son (Haydock Sprint Cup) and Porto Bello (New Stakes). He was sold and exported to Japan where he died 30 September 1979.

== Pedigree ==
Pedigree of Floribunda (GB), bay stallion, 1958
Sire Princely Gift (GB) 1951	Nasrullah (GB); 1940	Nearco	Pharos
Sire Princely Gift (GB) 1951	Nasrullah (GB); 1940	Nearco	Nogara
Sire Princely Gift (GB) 1951	Nasrullah (GB); 1940	Mumtaz Begum	Blenheim
Sire Princely Gift (GB) 1951	Nasrullah (GB); 1940	Mumtaz Begum	Mumtaz Mahal
Sire Princely Gift (GB) 1951	Blue Gem (GB); 1943	Blue Peter	Fairway
Sire Princely Gift (GB) 1951	Blue Gem (GB); 1943	Blue Peter	Fancy Free
Sire Princely Gift (GB) 1951	Blue Gem (GB); 1943	Sparkle	Blandford
Sire Princely Gift (GB) 1951	Blue Gem (GB); 1943	Sparkle	Gleam
Dam Astrentia (GB) 1953	Denturius (GB); 1937	Gold Bridge	Golden Boss
Dam Astrentia (GB) 1953	Denturius (GB); 1937	Gold Bridge	Flying Diadem
Dam Astrentia (GB) 1953	Denturius (GB); 1937	La Solfatara	Lemberg
Dam Astrentia (GB) 1953	Denturius (GB); 1937	La Solfatara	Ayesha
Dam Astrentia (GB) 1953	Aherlow Valley (GB); 1945	His Highness	Hyperion
Dam Astrentia (GB) 1953	Aherlow Valley (GB); 1945	His Highness	Moti Ranee
Dam Astrentia (GB) 1953	Aherlow Valley (GB); 1945	Glen of Aherlow	Young Lover
Dam Astrentia (GB) 1953	Aherlow Valley (GB); 1945	Glen of Aherlow	Diana Bula (Family:1-o)
