= Cartier Horse of the Year =

European horse racing award

The Cartier Horse of the Year is an award in European horse racing, founded in 1991, and sponsored by Cartier SA as part of the Cartier Racing Awards. The award winner is decided by points earned in group races plus the votes cast by British racing journalists and readers of the Racing Post and The Daily Telegraph newspapers.

== Records ==
Most successful horse (2 wins):

- Ouija Board – 2004, 2006
- Frankel – 2011, 2012
- Enable – 2017, 2019

Leading trainer (6 wins):

- Aidan O'Brien – Giant's Causeway (2000), Rock of Gibraltar (2002), Dylan Thomas (2007), Minding (2016), St Mark's Basilica (2021), City of Troy (2024)

Leading owner (6 wins):

- Sue Magnier – Giant's Causeway (2000), Rock of Gibraltar (2002), Dylan Thomas (2007), Minding (2016), St Mark's Basilica (2021), City of Troy (2024)

=== Winners ===
Year	Horse	Age	Gender	Bred	Trained	Trainer	Owner
1991	Arazi	2	C	USA	FR	François Boutin	Allen Paulson
1992	User Friendly	3	F	GB	GB	Clive Brittain	Bill Gredley
1993	Lochsong	5	M	GB	GB	Ian Balding	Jeff Smith
1994	Barathea	4	C	IRE	GB	Luca Cumani	Sheikh Mohammed
1995	Ridgewood Pearl	3	F	GB	IRE	John Oxx	Anne Coughlan
1996	Helissio	3	C	FR	FR	Élie Lellouche	Enrique Sarasola
1997	Peintre Celebre	3	C	USA	FR	André Fabre	Daniel Wildenstein
1998	Dream Well	3	C	FR	FR	Pascal Bary	Niarchos family
1999	Daylami	5	H	IRE	GB	Saeed bin Suroor	Godolphin
2000	Giant's Causeway	3	C	USA	IRE	Aidan O'Brien	Sue Magnier and Michael Tabor
2001	Fantastic Light	5	H	USA	GB	Saeed bin Suroor	Godolphin
2002	Rock of Gibraltar	3	C	IRE	IRE	Aidan O'Brien	Sue Magnier and Alex Ferguson
2003	Dalakhani	3	C	IRE	IRE	Jim Bolger	Princess Haya of Jordan
2004	Ouija Board	3	F	GB	GB	Ed Dunlop	Edward Stanley, 19th Earl of Derby
2005	Hurricane Run	3	C	IRE	FR	André Fabre	Michael Tabor
2006	Ouija Board	5	M	GB	GB	Ed Dunlop	Edward Stanley, 19th Earl of Derby
2007	Dylan Thomas	4	C	IRE	IRE	Aidan O'Brien	Sue Magnier and Michael Tabor
2008	Zarkava	3	F	IRE	FR	Alain de Royer-Dupré	Aga Khan IV
2009	Sea the Stars	3	C	IRE	IRE	John Oxx	Christopher Tsui
2010	Goldikova	5	M	IRE	FR	Freddy Head	Wertheimer et Frère
2011	Frankel	3	C	GB	GB	Henry Cecil	Khalid Abdullah
2012	Frankel	4	C	GB	GB	Henry Cecil	Khalid Abdullah
2013	Treve	3	F	FR	FR	Criquette Head-Maarek	Sheikh Joaan al Thani
2014	Kingman	3	C	GB	GB	John Gosden	Khalid Abdullah
2015	Golden Horn	3	C	GB	GB	John Gosden	Anthony Oppenheimer
2016	Minding	3	F	IRE	IRE	Aidan O'Brien	Tabor, Smith and Magnier
2017	Enable	3	F	GB	GB	John Gosden	Khalid Abdullah
2018	Roaring Lion	3	C	USA	GB	John Gosden	Qatar Racing
2019	Enable	5	M	GB	GB	John Gosden	Khalid Abdullah
2020	Ghaiyyath	5	H	IRE	GB	Charlie Appleby	Godolphin
2021	St Mark's Basilica	3	C	FR	IRE	Aidan O'Brien	Tabor, Smith and Magnier
2022	Baaeed	4	C	GB	GB	William Haggas	Shadwell Estate
2023	Ace Impact	3	C	IRE	FR	Jean-Claude Rouget	Ecuries Serge Stempniak
2024	City of Troy	3	C	USA	IRE	Aidan O'Brien	Magnier, Tabor & Smith
2025	Calandagan	4	G	IRE	FR	Francis-Henri Graffard	Aga Khan Studs SCEA
2026	Ombudsman	5	H	IRE	IRE	John & Thady Gosden	Godolphin
