= Lochsong =

British-bred Thoroughbred racehorse

- Sire: Song
- Grandsire: Sing Sing
- Dam: Peckitt's Well
- Damsire: Lochnager
- Sex: Mare
- Foaled: 26 April 1988
- Country: Great Britain
- Colour: Bay
- Breeder: Littleton Stud
- Owner: Jeff C. Smith
- Trainer: Ian Balding
- Record: 27: 15-2-4
- Earnings: £600,888

Major wins
- Stewards' Cup (1992); Portland Handicap (1992); Ayr Gold Cup (1992); Sprint Stakes (1993); King George Stakes (1993 & 1994); Nunthorpe Stakes (1993); Prix de l'Abbaye (1993 & 1994); Palace House Stakes (1994); Temple Stakes (1994); King's Stand Stakes (1994); Timeform rating: 129

Awards
- Cartier Champion Sprinter (1993 & 1994); Cartier Horse of the Year (1993)
- Last updated on 4 August 2023

Lochsong (26 April 1988 – 27 May 2014) was a bay Thoroughbred filly who twice won the Cartier Award as Top European Sprinter and was voted 1993 European Horse of the Year.

== Background ==
Lochsong was a bay mare bred by her owner, Jeff Smith's Littleton stud.

== Racing career ==
As a two and three-year-old in racing, Lochsong accomplished little until Ian Balding took over as her trainer. In 1992 the filly won the rare Sprint-Handicap triple of Stewards' Cup, Portland Handicap and Ayr Gold Cup. The filly won numerous other top races including the Group 1 Nunthorpe Stakes as well as twice capturing the Group 1 Prix de l'Abbaye at Longchamp in Paris, France.

== Assessment and honours ==
In addition to her two Top Sprinter awards, Lochsong's performance in the 1993 season won her the most prestigious honor in European horse racing, the Cartier Racing Award as European Horse of the Year.

== Stud record ==
Lochsong was retired to her owner's Littleton Stud in the parish of Littleton & Harestock in Hampshire, England. On 27 May 2014, Lochsong was euthanised at Littleton after contracting colic.

Her foals included:

1999 Lochridge (GB): Chesnut filly, foaled 27 March, by Indian Ridge (IRE) – won 5 races including the LR Flying Fillies' Stakes at Pontefract and placed 7 times including 2nd LR Achilles Stakes at Kempton, 3rd G2 Diadem Stakes, Ascot and G3 Summer Stakes at York from 24 starts in Britain and France 2001–2004 – dam of winners

2003 Loch Verdi (GB): Bay filly, foaled 15 February, by Green Desert (USA) – won 4 races including the LR EBF Flower of Scotland Stakes at Hamilton and placed 6 times including 2nd LR Scarbrough Stakes at Doncaster from 20 starts in Britain 2005–2008 – dam of winners
