= Sean Kirrane =

Irish jockey

Personal information
- Born: London, United Kingdom
- Occupation: Jockey

Horse racing career
- Sport: Horse racing

Major racing wins
- Nunthorpe Stakes (2023)

Significant horses
- Live In The Dream

Sean Kirrane is a Group 1-winning Irish jockey.

Kirrane grew up in Mount Merrion on the outskirts of Dublin, ten minutes walk from Leopardstown Racecourse, which he used to visit as a child. He attended Blackrock College. He was from a non-racing background but started riding as a teenager after his uncle put him in contact with trainer Willie Mullins. He had his first victory on Bainne, trained by Johnny Levins in an apprentice handicap at the Curragh in 2017. It was his sixth racecourse ride.

In his first full season in the UK in 2019, he rode 20 winners from 152 rides and bettered that in 2022 with 23 from 194.

He is currently based with trainer Tim Easterby in Malton, North Yorkshire but gained his first major success on the Adam West trained Live In The Dream in the 2023 Nunthorpe Stakes at York, not long after losing his apprentice's allowance. The win was both Kirrane's and West's first at Group level. His association with the horse and West's stable came about by chance, after he stayed over in the south of England between days riding at Epsom and Goodwood and called West in Epsom to see if he could ride out for him.

== Major wins ==
(United Kingdom) Great Britain

- Nunthorpe Stakes - (1) - Live In The Dream (2023)
