= Kostroma (horse) =

Irish-bred Thoroughbred racehorse

- Sire: Caerleon
- Grandsire: Nijinsky
- Dam: Katie May
- Damsire: Busted
- Sex: Filly
- Foaled: 1986
- Country: Ireland
- Colour: Bay
- Breeder: Thomas B. Stack & Valerio Ltd
- Owner: 1) Robert E. Sangster (Ireland); 2) William de Burgh, Prestonwood Farm, Robert E. Sangster (USA)
- Trainer: 1) Thomas B. Stack (Ireland); 2) Gary F. Jones (USA)
- Record: 26: 12-2-3
- Earnings: US$1,205,813

Major wins
- Mooresbridge Stakes (1990); Ballycullen Stakes (1990); Brownstown Stakes (1990); Desmond Stakes (1990); Osunitas Handicap (1991); Las Palmas Handicap (1991); Yellow Ribbon Stakes (1991); Beverly D. Stakes (1992); Dahlia Handicap (1992); Wilshire Handicap (1992)

Kostroma (foaled 1986 in Ireland) was an Irish-bred Thoroughbred racehorse who competed successfully in Ireland as well as in the United States, where she set a world record for a mile and an eighth on turf at Santa Anita Park in Arcadia, California.

== Breeding ==
Kostroma was bred in Ireland by Valerio Ltd. in partnership with trainer Tommy Stack. Out of the mare Katie May, whose sire was the 1967 English Horse of the Year, Busted, she was sired by Caerleon, a two-time leading sire in Great Britain & Ireland and son of English Triple Crown champion Nijinsky.

== Racing in Ireland ==
At age three, Kostroma made a winning debut on May 20, 1989, for owner Robert Sangster and trainer Tommy Slack in the Glengarrif Fillies Maiden at Ireland's Curragh Racecourse. She raced four more times that year without another win, but at age four won her 1990 debut, taking the Mooresbridge Stakes at the Curragh. She went on to win the Ballycullen Stakes, Brownstown Stakes and Desmond Stakes before being sent to California to compete in the November 4, 1990, Grade I Yellow Ribbon Invitational Stakes at Santa Anita Park. Kostroma finished a distant eighth to longshot winner Plenty of Grace.

== Racing in the United States ==
Owner Robert Sangster sold a share of Kostroma to Americans William de Burgh and Prestonwood Farm, and her race conditioning was then taken over by California-based trainer Gary Jones. A stomach disorder kept Kostroma out of racing until early September 1991, but she returned to set a stakes record in winning the Osunitas Handicap at Del Mar Racetrack. Six weeks later, Kostroma won the October 20 Las Palmas Handicap at Santa Anita, setting a world record time of 1:43.92 for 1 1/8 miles on turf. She next won the Grade I Yellow Ribbon Invitational Stakes on November 10 at Santa Anita Park.

Racing at age six in 1992, Kostroma added two more Grade I wins, capturing the Beverly D. Stakes at Arlington Park in Chicago and the Santa Barbara Handicap at Santa Anita Park. In addition, she won the Grade II Dahlia Handicap and Grade III Wilshire Handicap, both at Hollywood Park.

== Broodmare ==
Kostroma was bred to top sires including Storm Cat, Danzig, and AP Indy. Her best offspring on the track was a 2005 filly by Doneraile Court named Ariege, who earned more than half a million dollars with wins including the Grade I Kentucky Oaks.

== Pedigree ==
Pedigree of Kostroma
Sire Caerleon	Nijinsky	Northern Dancer	Nearctic
Sire Caerleon	Nijinsky	Northern Dancer	Natalma
Sire Caerleon	Nijinsky	Flaming Page	Bull Page
Sire Caerleon	Nijinsky	Flaming Page	Flaring Top
Sire Caerleon	Foreseer	Round Table	Princequillo
Sire Caerleon	Foreseer	Round Table	Knight's Daughter
Sire Caerleon	Foreseer	Regal Gleam	Hail To Reason
Sire Caerleon	Foreseer	Regal Gleam	Miz Carol
Dam Katie May	Busted	Crepello	Donatello
Dam Katie May	Busted	Crepello	Crepuscule
Dam Katie May	Busted	Sans Le Sou	Vimy
Dam Katie May	Busted	Sans Le Sou	Martian Loan
Dam Katie May	Cawston's Pride	Con Brio	Ribot
Dam Katie May	Cawston's Pride	Con Brio	Petronella
Dam Katie May	Cawston's Pride	Cawston Tower	Maharaj Kumar
Dam Katie May	Cawston's Pride	Cawston Tower	Silver Ribbon
