= Nunthorpe Stakes =

Flat horse race in Britain

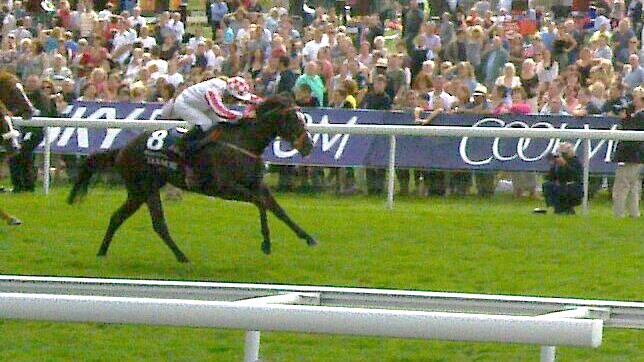
- Sole Power winning the race in 2010
- Class: Group 1
- Location: York Racecourse; York, England
- Inaugurated: 1922
- Race type: Flat
- Sponsor: Coolmore
- Website: York

Race information
- Distance: 5f (1,006 metres)
- Surface: Turf
- Track: Straight
- Qualification: Two-years-old and up
- Weight: 8 st 3 lb (2yo); 9 st 11 lb (3yo); 9 st 13 lb (4yo+); Allowances; 3 lb for fillies and mares
- Purse: £600,000 (2026); 1st: £340,260

Nunthorpe Stakes
2026
Bacio	Starlust	Rumstar

Previous years
2025
Asfoora	Ain't Nobody	Frost At Dawn
2024
Bradsell	Believing	Starlust
2023
Live In The Dream	Highfield Princess	Bradsell
2022
Highfield Princess	The Platinum Queen	Emaraaty Ana
2021
Winter Power	Emaraaty Ana	Dragon Symbol

2020-2011
2020
Battaash	Que Amoro	Moss Gill
2019
Battaash	Soldier's Call	So Perfect
2018
Alpha Delphini	Mabs Cross	Blue Point
2017
Marsha	Lady Aurelia	Cotai Glory
2016
Mecca's Angel	Limato	Take Cover
2015
Mecca's Angel	Acapulco	Mattmu
2014
Sole Power	Stepper Point	Extortionist
2013
Jwala	Shea Shea	Sole Power
2012
Ortensia	Spirit Quartz	Hamish McGonagall
2011
Margot Did	Hamish McGonagall	Prohibit

2010-2001
2010
Sole Power	Starspangledbanner	Piccadilly Filly
2009
Borderlescott	Benbaun	Radiohead
2008
Borderlescott	National Colour	Kingsgate Native
2007
Kingsgate Native	Desert Lord	Dandy Man
2006
Reverence	Amadeus Wolf	Pivotal Flame
2005
La Cucaracha	The Tatling	Majestic Missile
2004
Bahamian Pirate	The Tatling	One Cool Cat
2003
Oasis Dream	The Tatling	Acclamation
2002
Kyllachy	Malhub	Indian Prince
2001
Mozart	Nuclear Debate	Bishops Court

2000-1991
2000
Nuclear Debate	Bertolini	Pipalong
1999
Stravinsky	Sainte Marine	Proud Native
1998
Lochangel	Sainte Marine	Dashing Blue
1997
Coastal Bluff	Ya Malak	Averti
1996
Pivotal	Eveningperformance	Hever Golf Rose
1995
So Factual	Ya Malak	Hever Golf Rose
1994
Piccolo	Blue Siren	Mistertopogigo
1993
Lochsong	Paris House	College Chapel
1992
Lyric Fantasy	Mr Brooks	Diamonds Galore
1991
Sheikh Albadou	Paris House	Blyton Lad

1990-1981
1990
Dayjur	Statoblest	Pharaoh's Delight
1989
Cadeaux Genereux	Silver Fling	Statoblest
1988
Handsome Sailor	Silver Fling	Perion
1987
Ajdal	Sizzling Melody	Perion
1986
Last Tycoon	Double Schwartz	Green Desert
1985
Never So Bold	Primo Dominie	Storm Warning
1984
Committed	Jonacris	Habibti
1983
Soba	Habibti	Fine Edge
1982
Sharpo	Chellaston Park	Kind Music
1981
Sharpo	Marwell	Moorestyle

1980-1978
1980
Sharpo	Valeriga	Abdu
1979
Ahonoora	Thatching	Abdu
1978
Solinus	Smarten Up	Epsom Imp

The Nunthorpe Stakes is a Group 1 flat horse race in Great Britain open to horses aged two years or older. It is run at York over a distance of 5 furlongs (1,006 metres), and it is scheduled to take place each year in August.

== History ==
The event is named after Nunthorpe, an area of York. The first version, a low-grade selling race, was established in 1903. The present version began in 1922, and the inaugural running was won by Two Step.

The race was sponsored by William Hill from 1976 to 1989, and during this period it was known as the William Hill Sprint Championship. It has had several different sponsors since then, and the latest is Coolmore Stud, which started supporting the event in 2007.

The Nunthorpe Stakes became part of the Breeders' Cup Challenge series in 2011. The winner of the race now earns an automatic invitation to compete in the same year's Breeders' Cup Turf Sprint.

The event is one of a limited number of races in which two-year-old horses can compete against their elders. The first juvenile to win was High Treason in 1953, and the most recent was Kingsgate Native in 2007. It is also the only Group 1 race in Great Britain open to two-year-old geldings.

The Nunthorpe Stakes is currently held on the third day of York's four-day Ebor Festival meeting.

== Records ==
Most successful horse (3 wins):

- Tag End – 1928, 1929, 1930
- Sharpo – 1980, 1981, 1982

Other repeat winners (2 wins):

- Highborn – 1926, 1927
- Linklater – 1942, 1943
- Abernant – 1949, 1950
- Royal Serenade – 1951, 1952
- Right Boy – 1958, 1959
- Borderlescott – 2008, 2009
- Sole Power - 2010,2014
- Mecca's Angel – 2015, 2016
- Battaash – 2019, 2020

Leading jockey (7 wins):

- Lester Piggott – Right Boy (1958, 1959), Matatina (1963), Caterina (1966), Tower Walk (1969), Swing Easy (1971), Solinus (1978)

Leading trainer (5 wins):

- Ossie Bell – Highborn II (1926, 1927), Greenore (1932), Concerto (1933), Ipsden (1937)

Leading owner (3 wins):

- Sir Hugo Cunliffe-Owen – Highborn II (1926, 1927), Concerto (1933)
- Jack Joel – Tag End (1928, 1929, 1930)
- Monica Sheriffe – Sharpo (1980, 1981, 1982)

== Winners ==
Year	Winner	Age	Jockey	Trainer	Owner	Time
1922	Two Step	3	Herbert Jones	Alec Taylor Jr.	S Tattersall	0:59.40
1923	Golden Boss	3	Charlie Elliott	Cecil Boyd-Rochfort	A K Macomber	1:00.80
1924	Mumtaz Mahal	3	George Archibald	Dick Dawson	Aga Khan III	0:59.80
1925	Diomedes	3	Jack Leach	Harvey Leader	Sidney Beer	0:59.60
1926	Highborn	3	Joe Childs	Ossie Bell	Hugo Cunliffe-Owen	0:59.80
1927	Highborn	4	Joe Childs	Ossie Bell	Hugo Cunliffe-Owen	1:03.00
1928	Tag End	4	Brownie Carslake	Charles Peck	Jack Barnato Joel	1:00.20
1929	Tag End	5	Freddie Fox	Charles Peck	Jack Barnato Joel	0:58.00
1930	Tag End	6	Brownie Carslake	Charles Peck	Jack Barnato Joel	1:00.00
1931	Portlaw	3	Harry Beasley	Atty Persse	Abe Bailey	1:02.00
1932	Greenore	3	Harry Wragg	Ossie Bell	Lady Ludlow	0:59.60
1933	Concerto	5	Brownie Carslake	Ossie Bell	Hugo Cunliffe-Owen	0:59.00
1934	Gold Bridge	5	Charlie Elliott	Vandeleur Beatty	Lord Beatty	0:57.00
1935	Shalfleet	4	Henri Jelliss	Harvey Leader	Harvey Leader	0:58.80
1936	Bellacose	4	Patrick Beasley	Jack Colling	P Dunne	1:00.40
1937	Ipsden	4	Sam Wragg	Ossie Bell	Lady Ludlow	0:58.80
1938	Mickey The Greek	4	Harry Wragg	Henry Leach	Henry Leach	0:58.60
1939	Portobello	3	Gordon Richards	Jack Colling	P Dunne	1:00.00
1940-41	No race
1942 (Note: Took place at Newmarket)	Linklater	6	Eph Smith	William Smyth	A E Saunders	1:00.60
1943	Linklater	7	Eph Smith	William Smyth	A E Saunders	1:00.20
1944	Sugar Palm	6	Charlie Elliott	Frank Hartigan	A Bonsor	1:00.00
1945	Golden Cloud	4	Michael Beary	Teddy Lambton	Mrs G Lambton	0:59.00
1946	The Bug	3	Charlie Smirke	Marcus Marsh	Norman Wachman	0:59.80
1947	Como	5	Harry Carr	Gerald Armstrong	J Fielden	0:58.80
1948	Careless Nora	3	Charlie Elliott	Johnny Dines	George Frampton	0:58.40
1949	Abernant	3	Gordon Richards	Noel Murless	Reginald Macdonald-Buchanan	0:58.20
1950	Abernant	4	Gordon Richards	Noel Murless	Reginald Macdonald-Buchanan	0:58.60
1951	Royal Serenade	3	Charlie Elliott	Harry Wragg	Mrs G Kohn	0:58.80
1952	Royal Serenade	4	Gordon Richards	Harry Wragg	G Bell	1:00.80
1953	High Treason	2	Derrick Greening	Ted Leader	Jim Joel	0:59.20
1954	My Beau	2	Tommy Carter	Paddy Prendergast	A Wimbush	1:02.60
1955	Royal Palm	3	Willie Snaith	Sam Armstrong	Jack Gerber	0:58.80
1956	Ennis	2	Paul Tulk	Walter Nightingall	C Harper	1:01.00
1957	Gratitude	4	Willie Snaith	Humphrey Cottrill	Lionel Brook Holliday	1:02.60
1958	Right Boy	4	Lester Piggott	Bill Dutton	Geoffrey Gilbert	1:02.40
1959	Right Boy	5	Lester Piggott	Pat Rohan	David Wills	0:59.00
1960	Bleep-Bleep	4	Harry Carr	Harry Cottrill	Mrs M Turner	1:00.00
1961	Floribunda	3	Ron Hutchinson	Paddy Prendergast	Meg Mullion	0:59.60
1962	Gay Mairi	3	Scobie Breasley	H Whiteman	A Macdonald	1:01.40
1963	Matatina	3	Lester Piggott	Sam Armstrong	Mrs R Wilson	1:00.40
1964	Althrey Don	3	Russ Maddock	Pat Rohan	J Done	0:59.20
1965	Polyfoto	3	Jock Wilson	Eddie Reavey	Mrs C Reavey	1:00.80
1966	Caterina	3	Lester Piggott	Sam Armstrong	R F Scully	0:59.60
1967	Forlorn River	5	Bruce Raymond	Arthur Stephenson	Mrs W A Richardson	1:01.60
1968	So Blessed	3	Frankie Durr	Michael Jarvis	David Robinson	0:59.40
1969	Tower Walk	3	Lester Piggott	Geoffrey Barling	V W Hardy	0:59.20
1970	Huntercombe	3	Sandy Barclay	Arthur Budgett	H Renshaw	1:04.00
1971	Swing Easy	3	Lester Piggott	Jeremy Tree	John Hay Whitney	1:00.80
1972	Deep Diver	3	Bill Williamson	Paul Davey	David Robinson	0:57.70
1973	Sandford Lad	3	Tony Murray	Ryan Price	C Olley	1:00.60
1974	Blue Cashmere	4	Edward Hide	Michael Stoute	R Clifford-Turner	0:59.21
1975	Bay Express	4	Willie Carson	Peter Nelson	P Miller	0:58.99
1976	Lochnager	4	Edward Hide	Mick Easterby	Charles Spence	0:58.92
1977	Haveroid	3	Edward Hide	Neil Adam	T Newton	1:01.47
1978	Solinus	3	Lester Piggott	Vincent O'Brien	Danny Schwartz	0:59.23
1979	Ahonoora (Note: Thatching finished first in 1979 but was disqualified and placed last after a stewards' enquiry)	4	Greville Starkey	Frankie Durr	Essa Alkhalifa	1:00.58
1980	Sharpo	3	Pat Eddery	Jeremy Tree	Monica Sheriffe	1:01.20
1981	Sharpo	4	Pat Eddery	Jeremy Tree	Monica Sheriffe	1:00.86
1982	Sharpo	5	Steve Cauthen	Jeremy Tree	Monica Sheriffe	0:58.68
1983	Habibti	3	Willie Carson	John Dunlop	Mohamed Mutawa	0:57.99
1984	Committed	4	Brent Thomson	Dermot Weld	Robert Sangster	0:57.24
1985	Never So Bold	5	Steve Cauthen	Robert Armstrong	Edward Kessly	0:59.81
1986	Last Tycoon	3	Yves Saint-Martin	Robert Collet	Richard C. Strauss	0:57.47
1987	Ajdal	3	Walter Swinburn	Michael Stoute	Sheikh Mohammed	0:58.48
1988	Handsome Sailor	5	Michael Hills	Barry Hills	Robert Sangster	0:58.73
1989	Cadeaux Genereux	4	Pat Eddery	Alex Scott	Maktoum Al Maktoum	0:57.67
1990	Dayjur	3	Willie Carson	Dick Hern	Hamdan Al Maktoum	0:56.16
1991	Sheikh Albadou	3	Pat Eddery	Alex Scott	Hilal Salem	0:58.21
1992	Lyric Fantasy	2	Michael Roberts	Richard Hannon Sr.	7th Earl of Carnarvon	0:57.39
1993	Lochsong	5	Frankie Dettori	Ian Balding	Jeff Smith	0:58.12
1994	Piccolo (Note: Blue Siren finished first in 1994, but she was relegated to second place following a stewards' inquiry)	3	John Reid	Mick Channon	John Mitchell & Partners	0:57.61
1995	So Factual	5	Frankie Dettori	Saeed bin Suroor	Godolphin	0:57.47
1996	Pivotal	3	George Duffield	Sir Mark Prescott	Cheveley Park Stud	0:56.53
1997 (dh)	Coastal Bluff; Ya Malak	5; 6	Kevin Darley; Alex Greaves	David Barron; David Nicholls	Mrs David Sharp; Contrac / Consultco	0:59.58
1998	Lochangel	4	Frankie Dettori	Ian Balding	Jeff Smith	0:56.83
1999	Stravinsky	3	Michael Kinane	Aidan O'Brien	Magnier / Tabor	0:59.33
2000	Nuclear Debate	5	Gérald Mossé	John Hammond	Bob Chester	0:57.83
2001	Mozart	3	Michael Kinane	Aidan O'Brien	Tabor / Magnier	0:57.27
2002	Kyllachy	4	Jamie Spencer	Henry Candy	Thurloe / Cheveley Park	0:58.10
2003	Oasis Dream	3	Richard Hughes	John Gosden	Khalid Abdullah	0:56.20
2004	Bahamian Pirate	9	Seb Sanders	David Nicholls	Lucayan Stud	0:59.89
2005	La Cucaracha	4	Michael Hills	Barry Hills	Guy Reed	0:56.82
2006	Reverence	5	Kevin Darley	Eric Alston	G. & L. Middlebrook	1:00.68
2007	Kingsgate Native	2	Jimmy Quinn	John Best	John Mayne	0:58.14
2008	Borderlescott	6	Pat Cosgrave	Robin Bastiman	Edgar / Donaldson	0:56.09
2009	Borderlescott	7	Neil Callan	Robin Bastiman	Edgar / Donaldson	0:57.50
2010	Sole Power	3	Wayne Lordan	Edward Lynam	Sabena Power	0:57.14
2011	Margot Did	3	Hayley Turner	Michael Bell	Redman / Philipps	0:58.66
2012	Ortensia	7	William Buick	Paul Messara	Fraser / Fraser / Ridley	0:57.62
2013	Jwala	4	Steve Drowne	Robert Cowell	Manor Stud / Hoare	0:57.34
2014	Sole Power	7	Richard Hughes	Edward Lynam	Sabena Power	0:57.92
2015	Mecca's Angel	4	Paul Mulrennan	Michael Dods	David T J Metcalfe	0:57.24
2016	Mecca's Angel	5	Paul Mulrennan	Michael Dods	David T J Metcalfe	0:56.24
2017	Marsha	4	Luke Morris	Sir Mark Prescott	Elite Racing Club	0:57.97
2018	Alpha Delphini	7	Graham Lee	Bryan Smart	Alpha Delphini Partnership	0:57.18
2019	Battaash	5	Jim Crowley	Charles Hills	Hamdan Al Maktoum	0:55.90
2020	Battaash	6	Jim Crowley	Charles Hills	Hamdan Al Maktoum	0:57.38
2021	Winter Power	3	Silvestre De Sousa	Tim Easterby	King Power Racing	0:56.72
2022	Highfield Princess	5	Jason Hart	John Quinn	Trainers House Enterprises	0:57.18
2023	Live In The Dream	4	Sean Kirrane	Adam West	Steve & Jolene De'Lemos	0:56.87
2024	Bradsell	4	Hollie Doyle	Archie Watson	Victorious Racing	0:57.34
2025	Asfoora	7	Oisin Murphy	Henry Dwyer	Noor Elaine Farm Pty Ltd	0:57.38
2026	Bacio	3	Juan J. Hernandez	Wesley A. Ward	Myracehorse, Gladwell, Dailey, Dejablu	0:59.42

== See also ==
- Horse racing in Great Britain
- List of British flat horse races
