= Paddy Prendergast (racehorse trainer) =

Irish trainer (1910–1980)

Personal information
- Born: August 6, 1910 Carlow, Ireland
- Died: June 20, 1980 (aged 69)
- Occupation: Trainer

Horse racing career
- Sport: Horse racing

Major racing wins
- Irish Classic Race wins as trainer: Irish 1000 Guineas (1950, 1963, 1969, 1976, 1978); Irish Derby (1950, 1952, 1963, 1965); Irish Oaks (1952); Irish 2000 Guineas (1960, 1963, 1972, 1980); Irish St Leger (1962, 1963, 1974) British Classic Race wins as trainer: 2000 Guineas (1960); Epsom Oaks (1963); St Leger (1963); 1000 Guineas (1964)

Racing awards
- Irish flat racing Champion Trainer (1950, 1951, 1952, 1953, 1963, 1965); British flat racing Champion Trainer (1963, 1964, 1965)

Significant horses
- Windy City, The Pie King, Martial, Floribunda, La Tendresse, Noblesse, Ragusa, Pourparler, Meadow Court, Bold Lad (IRE), Ballymore, Sarah Siddons, Nikoli, Ardross

Patrick Joseph Prendergast (1910–1980), known as Paddy "Darkie" Prendergast was an Irish trainer of racehorses. He won seventeen Irish classics and became the first Irish trainer to have a major impact on British flat racing. He trained the first Irish winners of the 2000 Guineas and The Oaks and was British champion trainer for three successive seasons.

== Early career ==
Paddy Prendergast was born at Carlow in County Carlow, the eldest of a brotherhood of jockeys, but moved to Athy in County Kildare when very young. His father, Pat, was a horse trader and was known "as a good judge of hunters and other breeds". He was apprenticed to Roderic More O'Ferrall at Kildangan, County Kildare, but soon moved to Epsom where he rode under both rules but principally National Hunt. In August 1931 with his young bride he moved to Melbourne and obtained a licence to ride the following month. Their eldest son was born in Australia but though he rode there for a year he failed to ride any winners and returned to continue an unremarkable riding career in England and Ireland.

== Training career ==
Prendergast began training racehorses in 1940. An early illustration of Paddy Prendegast's skills at acquiring good horses cheaply was Pelorus who was acquired as a yearling for 30 guineas at Goffs in September 1941. Pelorus was successful on the flat and as a steeplechaser for many years including the Troytown Chase at Navan in 1949 and the Naas November Handicap in 1950. Pelorus, according to Michael O'Farrell in the Irish Times obituary published in 1980, established Paddy as a "trainer of some consequence". Prendergast had his first winner in Britain in 1945 and had his first champion five years later when Windy City was the top-rated two-year-old in Ireland, Britain and France. Prendergast soon became one of the leading trainers in Ireland, winning four Irish classics between 1950 and 1952. Between 1950 and 1965 he trained 12 two years olds to top the Irish Free handicap.

In 1950 Paddy Prendergast was Champion Trainer in Ireland with £25,764 then a record. His thirty horses won 53 races. Winners included the Irish Derby with Dark Warrior and Irish 1,000 Guineas with Princess Trudy. He also won several of the most important juvenile events including the Phoenix Plate with Gold Cup who was placed second overall allocated 9st 4lb's in the Irish Free Handicap known as the Madrid Handicap. In 1951 the Leading Trainers title in Ireland was retained with 44 winners generating prize money of £15,949. The main performers for the stable were two-year-olds. Blue Butterfly was the top filly winning two races including the National Produce Stakes, worth £1,723 at the Curragh in October which was Ireland's most valuable two-year-old race of the season. The best two-year-old for the year in both Ireland and England was Windy City. He won four times at two, including the Phoenix Plate at Phoenix Park racecourse and the Gimcrack at York. He was rated 142 by Timeform in Racehorses of 1951 the highest-rated two-year-old in that organisation's history. In 1952 P J Prendergast trained the winners of 74 races worth £31,527 in Ireland, a new Irish record. His winners included the Irish Derby with Thirteen Of Diamonds and Irish Oaks with Five Spots. Thirteen of Diamonds won the Irish Derby by 8 lengths and also won the mile-and-a-half Blandford Stakes at the Curragh before coming second in the Irish St Leger. Both Five Spots and Thirteen of Diamonds were owned by A. L (Henry) Hawkins who was leading owner in 1952. Six of the top nine two-year-olds in the Irish Free Handicap of 1952 were trained by Mr Prendergast. The leading two-year-old was the filly Royal Duchy, who won two races in Ireland, one in England (Lowther Stakes at York) and suffered her only defeat in France.

In 1953 Prendergast had considerable success in Britain with The Pie King, a two-year-old colt which won the Coventry Stakes, Richmond Stakes and Gimcrack Stakes and was the top-rated juvenile of the year. The Pie King was bought for 1,850 guineas by his trainer for the owner of Windy City Ray Bell. The Pie King was unplaced in a Maiden at Naas in March and won at Leopardstown over 5 furlongs. These were his only races in Ireland but he was rated top of the Irish Free Handicap with 10 stone 3 pounds based on his English form. He was allocated 9stone 7 pounds in the English Free Handicap which he also topped. In its review of the Racing Year, The Bloodstock Breeders Review of 1953 complimented Mr Prendergast on "his judgement of yearlings that he has bought two such brilliant colts in the space of three years, for neither are what is generally known as fashionably bred". Timeform rated The Pie King 132 and in its essay written by Phil Bull described The Pie King as "very smart, a good looker and a well muscled colt, who is fully entitled to his position as the head of both the English and Irish Free Handicaps".

In October that year he sent another two-year-old called Blue Sail to England for a race at Ascot. The horse, which had run poorly on his last two Irish starts, showed improved form and was narrowly beaten into second place. The stewards of the Jockey Club, the governing body of British racing, took the view that the variation in the horse's form was unacceptable and refused to accept further entries for horses trained by Prendergast, effectively banning him from competing in Britain. Irish Racing's governing body, the Irish Turf Club declined to uphold the decision and exonerated Prendergast, marking the first time that a ruling of the Jockey Club had been challenged by another national organisation. The ban, however, resulted in several good horses, including Blue Sail, being removed from Prendergast's stable. A description of the Blue Sail affair from the 1954 Bloodstock Breeders Review went as follows

The calm of the racing community in England and Ireland was disturbed by news of the temporary suspension of the training licences of P J Prendergast(towards the end of 1953) and of M V (Vincent) O'Brien and Michael Dawson in 1954, all of whom had their licences restored. ... Blue Sail came slowly to hand, for his first appearance on the racecourse was deferred till Navan August meeting when in the 6-furlong Dowth Maiden Two-Year-Old Plate he finished eighth of 28 runners, and, approximately a month afterwards, he was seventh of 15 runners in the 6-furlong 63 yards Railway Two-Year-Old Plate at the Curragh. Three weeks later he was one of 11 runners in the mile Two-Year-Old Cornwallis Stakes at Ascot Heath October meeting, and was beaten a neck by Plainsong.Raceform for 1953 shows Blue Sail finished second and was 5/2 favourite backed in from 3/1. The Racefrom notes state "useful:scope:unf:5th st: effrt 2f out: no ex cl home nk." Bloodstock Breeders Review account continuedthe Stewards of the Jockey Club published in The Racing Calendar a notice that the running of Blue Sail in the Cornwallis Stakes at Ascot on October 10th was inconsistent with his previous running in Ireland and that horses trained by P J Prendergast would not be allowed to run under their Rules and that no entries would be accepted from him. As Prendergast held a trainer's licence from the Stewards of the Turf Club and Irish National Hunt Steeplechase Committee, both bodies, acting conjointly, deemed necessary an enquiry by them into the Jockey Club's ruling. Thirteen witnesses were examined, and the verdict was that"The evidence before the Irish Stewards showed that their three senior officials were satisfied with the running of Blue Sail in Ireland. The Form Books of both countries were examined and the Stewards took note of the fact that the race at Ascot was over a distance of one mile, and that the race in Ireland, at the Curragh, in which Blue Sail ran, was over six furlongs and 63 yards. The Irish Stewards were of the opinion that on the evidence given before them there was no unexplained discrepancy. Prendergast's training in Ireland was of course uniterrupted, and when in August 1954 the Jockey Club's ban on horses trained by him from running in England was lifted he marked his return to favour by bringing ten horses to York August meeting and winning four races, amongst them the Nunthorpe Stakes.

Peter O'Sullevan the Racing journalist of the BBC and Daily Express commented that Blue Sail at Ascot "was a punt despite the jockey Tommy Gosling being 3 lb overweight". He also explained that the affair "aroused considerable feeling. It is being said in Ireland that the English are determined to win the Gimcrack themselves for a change" On the lifting of the ban O'Sullevan commented that the Senior Steward in England Sir Humphrey de Trafford said to Paddy Prendergast " Welcome back! Well done Paddy".

One of Paddy Prendergast's four winners at York in 1954 was ironically Blue Sail in the Voltigeur Stakes. Timeform's Racehorses of 1954 said of the race that Blue Sail "galloped right away from the field, and had ten lengths to spare over his nearest rival, at the finish."Heavy going that day was considered a factor in the scale of the win. Blue Sail was 10th in the St Leger won by Never Say Die. He was rated 119 in 1954 by Timeform.

Prendergast's ban was eventually lifted and in the early 1960s he enjoyed the most successful period of his career. In 1960 he sent out the 18/1 outsider Martial to become the first Irish trained horse to win England's 2000 Guineas in the 152-year history of the race. Prendergast had bought the horse as a yearling for 2,400 guineas at Dublin in September 1958. Later in 1960 he won the New Stakes with Floribunda, an exceptionally fast colt who went on to win the King George Stakes and Nunthorpe Stakes in 1961. Prendergast's next champion was the American-bred filly La Tendresse who won five races to become the top-rated two-year-old of either sex to run in Britain in 1961.

A year later, Prendergast found an even better juvenile in Noblesse who established herself as the best two-year-old filly of her generation by defeating colts in the Observer Gold Cup. Noblesse was even better as a three-year-old, winning The Oaks by ten lengths, before her career was curtailed by injury. Prendergast's biggest winner of 1963 however, was the colt Ragusa, who showed little worthwhile form before finishing third as a 25/1 outsider in The Derby. He then improved rapidly to win the Irish Derby, King George VI and Queen Elizabeth Stakes and St Leger Stakes. The success of Noblesse and Ragusa saw Prendergast become the first Irish-based trainer to win the British trainers' championship, with prize money of £125,294. Ragusa returned to win the Eclipse Stakes in 1964, a year in which Prendergast claimed a third British classic when Pourparler won the 1000 Guineas. His horses earned £128,012 in Britain, enabling him to retain his trainers' title. A third championship followed in 1965 when Meadow Court finished second in the Derby at Epsom before emulating Ragusa by winning the Irish Derby and the King George VI and Queen Elizabeth Stakes. Prendergast renamed his home and stables at Maddenstown, near The Curragh in honour of Meadow Court.

By the 1970s, Prendergast was having less success, but did win four more Irish classics during the decade. By this time, his sons Patrick Jnr and Kevin had both established themselves as leading trainers in Ireland. Paddy Prendergast died on 20 June 1980, less than two months after recording his last major success when Nikoli won the Irish 2000 Guineas.

== Assessment ==
Peter O'Sullevan described Patrick Prendergast as "a trainer of utterly exceptional talent and achievement" He went on to quote Champion Jockey Christy Roche who said "He was well before his time, an innovator. He concentrated on a horse's mind as much as his fitness. He liked them to be relaxed and confident, especially the fillies. He was brilliant at keeping them stress-free. The fillies would have a pony companion and he'd have them out (for two hours) on a lead rein from the pony's rider. The filly not mounted. That way they'd be exercised without knowing they'd done any work. He could judge their ability even before he had them in the yard."

The Irish Times described Paddy Prendergast "as the man who first brought Ireland into the international racing scene and who contributed more than any other in establishing his country as a major racing power. Paddy had many fine qualities as a trainer, but above all he was great judge of a horse".
