= Ian Balding =

British racehorse trainer (1938–2026)

- Balding at Kingsclere in 2001
- Born: Ian Anthony Balding; 7 November 1938; Long Branch, New Jersey, U.S.
- Died: 2 January 2026 (aged 87)
- Occupation: Horse trainer
- Spouse: Emma Hastings-Bass (m. 1969)
- Children: Clare; Andrew
- Father: Gerald Matthews Balding
- Relatives: Toby Balding (brother); Ivor G. Balding (uncle); Alice Arnold (daughter-in-law)

Ian Anthony Balding (7 November 1938 – 2 January 2026) was a British racehorse trainer. He was the son of the polo player and racehorse trainer Gerald Matthews Balding and the younger brother of trainer Toby Balding. Ian Balding was born in the US, but his family returned to the UK in 1945. He was educated at Marlborough College and Millfield school in Somerset. He went up to Christ's College, Cambridge, in 1959 to read Rural Estate Management, where he played Rugby for the university team, gaining his Blue in 1961 at full back. He started training in 1964. Kingsclere became his home at the age of 26 and it is here that he earned his reputation as an internationally respected trainer.

Balding principally trained horses for flat races, but did however bring Crystal Spirit to victory in 1991 at the Sun Alliance Novices' Hurdle. Ian Balding had influence on many top-class Thoroughbreds and race horses, amongst whom some are Mill Reef, Lochsong, Mrs Penny, Glint of Gold, Diamond Shoal, Gold and Ivory, Selkirk, Forest Flower, Dashing Blade, Robellino, Silver Fling, King of Clubs, Lochangel, Top Cees, Crystal Spirit, and Tagula. Ian Balding retired in 2002 and gave his Park House stables licence at Kingsclere, Hampshire, to his son Andrew.

== Career ==
=== 1970s ===
==== 1971 ====
Balding trained the winning horse, Mill Reef (1968–1986), ridden by Geoff Lewis, in the 1971 The Derby Stakes or Epsom Derby. The winning time was recorded at 2:37.14. Balding was again Mill Reef's trainer when the horse won the 1971 Prix de l'Arc de Triomphe at Longchamp Racecourse in Paris, France. Philanthropist Paul Mellon was Mill Reef's owner and the horse was again ridden by jockey Geoff Lewis. The purse won was €1,600,000. Mill Reef was introduced to racing older horses at Sandown Park in the Eclipse Stakes. With the same owner and jockey Mill Reef came in at a time of 2:05.40. 1971 was an excellent year for this three-year-old horse and its team, coming in first at the King George VI and Queen Elizabeth Stakes with a time of 2:32.56 on the 1 mile 4 furlongs (2,414 m) Ascot Racecourse. Even though Mill Reef was born and bred at the Virginia Rokeby Stables he was sent to England to race on turf courses in Europe and to be trained by Balding. Geoff Lewis rode Mill Reef in all his races, bearing the owner's colours: black with gold cross, stripe on cap.

=== 1980s ===
==== 1982 ====
Balding and owner, Paul Mellon entered the Grand Prix de Saint-Cloud twice consecutively. In 1982, four-year-old Glint of Gold ridden by Pat Eddery placed first with a time of 2:41.4. Again in 1983, the Saint-Cloud Racecourse saw a thoroughbred of Paul Mellon's stock, Diamond Shoal ridden by Steve Cauthen, win with a time of 2:34.9.

Balding has won several purses of €87,000 at the Grosser Preis von Baden (a German horse race at Iffezheim Racecourse in Baden-Baden of 2400 metres (12 furlongs). Glint of Gold, a four-year-old, performed well in 1982 under jockey Pat Eddery. The time of 2:29.10 by Glint of Gold was shortened to 2:28.00 by Diamond Shoal another of Paul Mellon's four-year-old thoroughbreds again ridden by Steve Cauthen in 1983.

==== 1985 ====
Again in 1985 Balding trained Gold and Ivory from Paul Mellon's Thoroughbreds to win in the Grosser Preis von Baden ridden by Cauthen. The winning time was 2:37.80 slower than that set in 1982, and 1983.

==== 1986 ====
In 1986 Forest Flower, a two-year-old filly owned by Mellon, trained by Balding and ridden by Tony Ives completed the 6 furlongs (1,207 m) Cherry Hinton Stakes at the Newmarket Racecourse in 1:12.38. Forest Flower performed well again in 1987 with the same trainer and jockey, winning the Irish 1,000 Guineas in the Republic of Ireland. Forest Flower, finished the 1-mile (1.6 km) at the Curragh Racecourse in 1:43.9.

In 1986 Balding trained Insular, owned by the Queen Mother, which won the 1986 Imperial Cup at Sandown.

==== 1988 ====
Jockey Pat Eddery rode Silver Fling at the Goodwood Racecourse in 1988. This three-year-old was trained by Ian Balding to capture the King George Stakes purse. Silver Fling won the 5 furlongs (1,006 m) in 0:58.50.

==== 1989 ====
The Dewhurst Stakes is a 7 furlongs (1,408 m) race at Newmarket's Rowley Mile course. Ian Balding trained Dashing Blade to come in first in 1989 with a time of 1:25.43. Jockey John Matthias and owner Jeff Smith were also part of this team.

1989 again saw a four-year-old, Silver Fling brought to the winner's circle which was trained by Ian Balding. George W. Strawbridge Jr., the owner, together with jockey John Matthias won the purse by completing the 1,000 metres (approximately 5 furlongs) at Longchamp Racecourse in 0:59.9. The purse at the French Prix de l'Abbaye de Longchamp was a win.

Jeff Smith's two-year-old, Dashing Blade received guidance from Ian Balding to come ahead in the 1989 National Stakes. The 7 furlongs (1,408 m) at the Curragh was completed in 1:25.2 with jockey John Matthias.

A 5 furlongs (1,006 metres) Group 3 flat race was won by Silver Fling in 1989. Jockey John Matthias rode the horse to victory in a time of 0:58.27. The trainer was Ian Balding to help achieve this Palace House Stakes purse at Newmarket's Rowley Mile course.

=== 1990s ===
==== 1990 ====
Paul Mellon entered two-year-old Heart of Darkness in the 1990 National Stakes. Jockey Pat Shanahan brought Heart of Darkness to victory in the 7 furlongs (1,408 m) race with a time of 1:23.1.

The Washington Singer Stakes was also a win for Heart of Darkness in 1990. Steve Cauthen, jockey, and Ian Balding entered the Listed race which is 7 furlongs (1,408 m). Heart of Darkness placed first at the Newbury Racecourse with a time of 1:30.41.

The Prix Eugène Adam at the French Maisons-Laffitte Racecourse was a win for Dashing Blade who was ridden by John Matthias in 1990. This three-year-old completed the distance of 2,000 metres (approximately 1 mile 2 furlongs) in 2:03.6.

Jeff Smith's three-year-old Dashing Blade competed in the 1990 Gran Premio d'Italia. Jockey Brian Rouse won the race at the San Siro Racecourse in Milan with a time of 2:29.2.

Song of Sixpence ran the 1 mile 2 furlongs and 7 yards (2,018 metres) in 2:07.40. This six-year-old was ridden by jockey, Steve Cauthen to complete the Winter Hill Stakes in first place.

==== 1991 ====
In 1991 jockey Jimmy Frost brought four-year-old novice racehorse, Crystal Spirit, to victory in the Sun Alliance Novices' Hurdle. This Grade 1 National Hunt hurdle race is a length of 2 miles 5 furlongs (4,225 m) at Cheltenham Racecourse.

The Queen Elizabeth II Stakes saw Selkirk win with a time of 1:44.34 in 1991. In 1992, Ian Balding was the trainer for Selkirk, ridden by now retired jockey Ray Cochrane. George W. Strawbridge Jr., the owner saw the horse come in first in a time of 1:36.99. Selkik also won the Celebration Mile in 1992 with a time of 1:41:72 on the 1-mile (1.6 km) Goodwood Racecourse. Again Ray Cochrane was the jockey. Selkirk received three victories in 1992, achieving success at the Challenge Stakes. The four-year-old ran the distance of 7 furlongs (1,408 m) in 1:22.27 at Newmarket's Rowley Mile course.

==== 1992 ====
1992 was a busy season for Ian Balding, who was also able to train Poker Chip and achieve victory at the Flying Childers Stakes. Working together with jockey Michael Hills, the 5 furlongs (1,006 m) Doncaster Racecourse was completed in 1:00.56.

Lochsong, a four-year-old, won the 1992 Ayr Gold Cup under the guidance of Ian Balding and riding skill of Francis Arrowsmith. This 6 furlongs (1,207 m) race at Ayr Racecourse saw a finishing time of 1:15.51. Ian Balding showed his skill in continuing training Lochsong, a bay filly, who was a winner in a flat horse race for two-year-old and above thoroughbreds. Lochsong was ridden by jockey, Frankie Dettori, and the horse owner was Jeff Smith. Nunthorpe Stakes was won in a time of 0:58.12 in 1993. Prix de l'Abbaye de Longchamp was completed by this team, 1,000 metres (approximately 5 furlongs) in 0:59.7 brought in the 1993 purse.

==== 1994 ====
1994 again saw Lochsong, bring in a victory by jockey, Frankie Dettori and trainer, Ian Balding with a time of 1:00.84. This time was over a distance of 5 furlongs and 6 yards (1,011 m) at Sandown Park in the Temple Stakes. The 1993 Group 3 Sprint Stakes purse was captured again by the team of Lochsong, Frankie Dettori. This 5 furlongs 6 yards (1,011 m) race was made in a net time of 1:00.32. The Oak Tree Stakes purse was also an easy win in 1993 for this same team. Lochsong ran the 7 furlongs (1,408 m) at Goodwood Racecourse in 1:00.20. Again in 1994, the time of 0:57.36 at Goodwood Racecourse won the Oak Tree Stakes purse. The King's Stand Stakes saw victory also in 1994 to this same team for Lochsong who easily completed the 5 furlongs (1,006 m) at Ascot Racecourse in a time of 1:00.73. 1994 also brought victory again at the Prix de l'Abbaye de Longchamp in France bringing in a purse for a run completed in 0:57.2. Lochsong was voted as the 1993 European Horse of the Year. Frankie Dettori, an Italian jockey of fame who was a Lester Award winner as well as nominated as a member of the Order of the British Empire.

==== 1995 ====
Trainer Ian Balding, and jockey Walter Swinburn combined to help the two-year-old, Tagula run the distance of 6 furlongs (1,207 m) in 1:11.83. This recorded time at the Newmarket Racecourse was enough to win the purse at the July Stakes in 1995. Robert and Elizabeth Hitchins had success at the Prix Morny also with Tagula in 1995. Walter Swinburn and Ian Balding were able to complete the 1,200 metres (approximately 6 furlongs) French Deauville Racecourse in 1:11.6.

==== 1996 ====
Jockey Pat Eddery rode a four-year-old named Grey Shot in 1996 at Goodwood Racecourse. Ian Balding as Grey Shot's trainer achieved a time of 3:25.17 in a 2 miles (3,219 m) Group 2 flat race, which earned the team the Goodwood Cup. Ian Balding teamed up with former jockey Pat Eddery who won the Lester Award for Flat Jockey of the Year.

Showing his skill at training Thoroughbreds in a flat race, Ian Balding trained Jayannpee, a five-year-old, to complete the 6 furlongs 8 yards (1,214 m) race. Willie Ryan, the jockey, rode Jayannpee to win the Hackwood Stakes purse in 1996.

The 1996 Princess Margaret Stakes purse was achieved by the filly Seebe who was ridden by Michael Hills. This 6 furlongs (1,207 m) Group 3 race was achieved in a time of 1:14.81.

==== 1997 ====
Grey Shot, a five-year-old, ran the a distance of 2 miles (3,219 m) at Newmarket in 1997. The Jockey Club Cup was the price to the delight of trainer Ian Balding and jockey Richard Quinn.

A 7 furlongs (1,408 metres) Listed flat race was raced in 1997 by Hidden Meadow. The European Free Handicap was completed in 1:25.60 by jockey Frankie Dettori.

==== 1998 ====
1998 saw a win for Ian Balding the trainer of Jeff Smith's Lochangel in the Nunthorpe Stakes. This race was completed in 0:56.83 by jockey Frankie Dettori.

==== 1999 ====
Top Cees was entered in the United Kingdom handicap race at Newmarket Racecourse in 1999. The Cesarewitch Handicap purse was won with a time of 3:40.30 over 2 miles 1 furlong 65 yards (3,479 m). Again teaming up with jockey Kieren Fallon was able to bring this nine-year-old, Top Cees to victory.

Grangeville was the 1999 winner at the Ayr Gold Cup for trainer Ian Balding, and jockey Kieren Fallon. 1:11.16 was the completion time to win this purse.

Ian Balding and jockey Kieren Fallon again paired up in 1999 and bring the four-year-old Trans Island to victory at the Prix Daniel Wildenstein. 1:44.9 was the time of completion for the distance of 1,600 metres (approximately 1 mile) at the Group 2 race at Longchamp Racecourse.

Continuing their good fortune in 1999 Kieren Fallon rode Putuna, a four-year-old filly to victory in the Dahlia Stakes. She covered the 1 mile 1 furlong (1,811 m) at Newmarket in 1:46.10.

Halmahera is a four-year-old which was ridden by jockey Kevin Darley in the 1999 Chipchase Stakes at Newcastle Racecourse. A time of 1:11.23 on the 6 furlongs (1,207 m) brought in the purse, for this horse trained by Ian Balding.

=== 2000s ===
==== 2000 ====
Ian Balding demonstrated his versatility as a trainer by starting the new millennium with Brandon Court's victory over hurdles at the Cheltenham New Year meeting.

==== 2001 ====
Later, in 2001, Ian Balding was able to bring a four-year-old, Distant Prospect and arrive again at Newmarket. Distant Prospect travelled the length of the Newmarket Racecourse, 2 miles 2 furlongs (3,621 m) from Cambridgeshire to place first for the Cesarewitch Handicap purse in Suffolk with jockey, Martin Dwyer. The race was completed in a time of 4:00.27.

In 2001, Ian Balding brings Nicobar a four-year-old, to Sandown Park racecourse to win the Sandown Mile in 1:49.61. Irish born, Kieren Fallon was Nicobar's jockey at this event.

Also in 2001 Ian Balding saw Firebreak ridden by jockey Martin Dwyer come to victory. The two-year-old won the Mill Reef Stakes in 1:11.79 at the Newbury Racecourse which is 6 furlongs and 8 yards (1,214 m) in distance.

The 1 mile 2 furlongs and 7 yards (2,018 m) at Sandown Park was completed in 2:08.69 by Border Arrow. This six-year-old won the 2001 Brigadier Gerard Stakes under the guidance of Ian Balding and jockey Frankie Dettori.

Trans Island, now a five-year-old won the Diomed Stakes in 2000. Kieren Fallon, jockey, and trainer, Ian Balding, saw the 1 mile 114 yards (1,714 m) completed in 1:44.15 at the Epsom Downs Racecourse.

== Personal life and death ==
Balding was born in Long Branch, New Jersey, United States.

He married Emma Hastings-Bass, now Lady Emma Balding, in 1969; they have two children. Emma is the only daughter of the trainer Peter Hastings-Bass and the sister of another trainer, William Hastings-Bass, 17th Earl of Huntingdon.

Their daughter Clare Balding was born in 1971 and is a journalist and broadcaster. Their son Andrew Balding was born in 1972 and is a Kingsclere horse trainer.

Balding died on 2 January 2026, at the age of 87.

== Awards ==
- Ian Balding won the 1971 award as British flat racing Champion Trainer of flat racing in Great Britain. This award is presented to the trainer whose horses have won the most prize money during a season.
- Honorary member of the Jockey Club.

== Published works ==
- Balding, Ian Making the Running: A Racing Life. (2004) Headline Book Publishing Ltd. ISBN 0-7553-1278-3

== See also ==
- List of significant families in British horse racing
