= Leading sire in Japan =

The list below shows the leading Thoroughbred sire of racehorses in Japan for each year since 1924. This is determined by the amount of prize money won by the sire's progeny during the season. The current leading sire in Japan is Kizuna.

== Records ==
Most leadings:

- 13 – Sunday Silence – 1995–2007
- 11 – Deep Impact – 2012–2022
- 10 – Northern Taste – 1982, 1983, 1985–1992
- 7 – Hindostan – 1961–1965, 1967, 1968
- 6 – Ebor – 1924–1929; Kumohata – 1952–1957; Tesco Boy – 1974, 1975, 1978–1981
- 5 – Tournesol – 1935–1939; Theft – 1947–1951

== Leading sires 1924–2025 ==
- 1924 – Ebor (1)
- 1925 – Ebor (2)
- 1926 – Ebor (3)
- 1927 – Ebor (4)
- 1928 – Ebor (5)
- 1929 – Ebor (6)
- 1930 – Chapel Brampton (1)
- 1931 – Perion (1)
- 1932 – Perion (2)
- 1933 – Clackmannan (1)
- 1934 – Clackmannan (2)
- 1935 – Tournesol (1)
- 1936 – Tournesol (2)
- 1937 – Tournesol (3)
- 1938 – Tournesol (4)
- 1939 – Tournesol (5)
- 1940 – Review Order (1)
- 1941 – Mint d'Or (1)
- 1942 – Diolite (1)
- 1943 – Diolite (2)
- 1944–45 – no racing in Japan
- 1946 – Diolite (3)
- 1947 – Theft (1)
- 1948 – Theft (2)
- 1949 – Theft (3)
- 1950 – Theft (4)
- 1951 – Theft (5)
- 1952 – Kumohata (1)
- 1953 – Kumohata (2)
- 1954 – Kumohata (3)
- 1955 – Kumohata (4)
- 1956 – Kumohata (5)
- 1957 – Kumohata (6)
- 1958 – Rising Flame (1)
- 1959 – Rising Flame (2)
- 1960 – Rising Flame (3)
- 1961 – Hindostan (1)
- 1962 – Hindostan (2)
- 1963 – Hindostan (3)
- 1964 – Hindostan (4)
- 1965 – Hindostan (5)
- 1966 – Solonaway (1)
- 1967 – Hindostan (6)
- 1968 – Hindostan (7)
- 1969 – Guersant (1)
- 1970 – Never Beat (1)
- 1971 – Partholon (1)
- 1972 – Never Beat (2)
- 1973 – China Rock (1)
- 1974 – Tesco Boy (1)
- 1975 – Tesco Boy (2)
- 1976 – Partholon (2)
- 1977 – Never Beat (3)
- 1978 – Tesco Boy (3)
- 1979 – Tesco Boy (4)
- 1980 – Tesco Boy (5)
- 1981 – Tesco Boy (6)
- 1982 – Northern Taste (1)
- 1983 – Northern Taste (2)
- 1984 – Partholon (3)
- 1985 – Northern Taste (3)
- 1986 – Northern Taste (4)
- 1987 – Northern Taste (5)
- 1988 – Northern Taste (6)
- 1989 – Northern Taste (7)
- 1990 – Northern Taste (8)
- 1991 – Northern Taste (9)
- 1992 – Northern Taste (10)
- 1993 – Real Shadai (1)
- 1994 – Tony Bin (1)
- 1995 – Sunday Silence (1)
- 1996 – Sunday Silence (2)
- 1997 – Sunday Silence (3)
- 1998 – Sunday Silence (4)
- 1999 – Sunday Silence (5)
- 2000 – Sunday Silence (6)
- 2001 – Sunday Silence (7)
- 2002 – Sunday Silence (8)
- 2003 – Sunday Silence (9)
- 2004 – Sunday Silence (10)
- 2005 – Sunday Silence (11)
- 2006 – Sunday Silence (12)
- 2007 – Sunday Silence (13)
- 2008 – Agnes Tachyon (1)
- 2009 – Manhattan Cafe (1)
- 2010 – King Kamehameha (1)
- 2011 – King Kamehameha (2)
- 2012 – Deep Impact (1)
- 2013 – Deep Impact (2)
- 2014 – Deep Impact (3)
- 2015 – Deep Impact (4)
- 2016 – Deep Impact (5)
- 2017 – Deep Impact (6)
- 2018 – Deep Impact (7)
- 2019 – Deep Impact (8)
- 2020 – Deep Impact (9)
- 2021 – Deep Impact (10)
- 2022 – Deep Impact (11)
- 2023 – Duramente (1)
- 2024 – Kizuna (1)
- 2025 – Kizuna (2)

== Top sire line ==
The following sire-lines have produced champion sires (1924–2023).

- Darley Arabian – 24 stallion, 89 leadings. All titles since 1985.
- Byerley Turk – 2 stallions, 8 championships, most recently Partholon in 1984.
- Godolphin Arabian – 1 stallion, 1 championship, most recently Chapel Brampton in 1930.

Sire lines of the leading sires

Darley Arabian	Byerley Turk	Godolphin Arabian
Bartlett's Childers	Jigg	Cade
Squirt	Partner	Matchem
Marske	Tartar	Conductor
Eclipse	Herod	Trumpator
King Fergus	Pot-8-os	Woodpecker	Sorcerer
Hambletonian	Waxy	Buzzard	Comus
Whitelock	Whalebone	Selim	Castrel	Humphrey
Blacklock	Sir Hercules	Camel	Sultan	Pantaloon	Melbourne
Voltaire	Birdcatcher	Touchstone	Bay Middleton	Windhound	West Australian
Voltigeur	The Baron	Newminster	The Flying Dutchman	Thormanby	Solon
Vedette	Stockwell	Rataplan	Hermit	Lord Clifden	Dollar	Atlantic	Barcaldine
Galopin	Doncaster	Blinkhoolie	Heaume	Hampton	Petrarch	Androcles	Le Sancy	Marco
St. Simon	Bend Or	Wisdom	Le Rois Soleil	Bay Ronald	Hacler	Cambyse	Le Samartain	Beppo
Chaucer	Desmond	Bona Vista	Ormonde	Love Wisely	Sans Souci	Bayardo	Ebor; 1924–1929	Gradefeu	Roi Herode	Chapel Brampton; 1930
Prince Chimay	Lomond	Cyllene	Orme	Amadis	La Farina	Gainsborough	Chouberski	The Tetrarch
Vatout	Clackmannan; 1933, 1934	Polymelus	Captivation	Flying Fox	Orby	Perion; 1931, 1932	Bubbles	Hyperion	Tournesol; 1935–1939	Bruleur	Tetratema
Bois Roussel	Phalaris	Kircubbin	Val d'Or	Grand Parade	Guersant; 1969	Rockefella	Kumohata; 1952–1957	Ksar	Theft; 1947–1951
Hindostan; 1961–1965, 1967, 1968	Sickle	Pharos	Fairway	Chateau Bouscaut	Mint d'Or; 1941	Diophon	Review Order; 1940	China Rock; 1973	Tourbillon
Unbreakable	Nearco	Solferino	The Phoenix	Diolite; 1942, 1943, 1946	Djebel
Polynesian	Royal Charger	Nearctic	Nasrullah	Solonaway; 1966	Rising Flame; 1958–1960	My Babu
Native Dancer	Turn-to	Northern Dancer	Grey Sovereign	Princely Gift	Never Say Die	Milesian
Raise a Native	Hail to Reason	Northern Taste; 1982, 1983, 1985–1992	Zeddaan	Tesco Boy; 1974, 1978–1981	Never Beat; 1970, 1972, 1977	Partholon; 1971, 1976, 1984
Mr. Prospector	Halo	Roberto	Kalamoun
Kingmambo	Sunday Silence; 1995–2007	Real Shadai; 1993	Kampala
King Kamehameha; 2010, 2011	Agnes Tachyon; 2008	Manhattan Cafe; 2009	Deep Impact; 2012–2022	Tony Bin; 1994
Duramente; 2023	Kizuna; 2024–2025

== See also ==
- Leading broodmare sire in Japan
- Leading sire in Australia
- Leading sire in France
- Leading sire in Germany
- Leading sire in Great Britain & Ireland
- Leading sire in North America
- Leading broodmare sire in Great Britain & Ireland
- Leading broodmare sire in North America
