= Diolite =

British-bred Thoroughbred racehorse

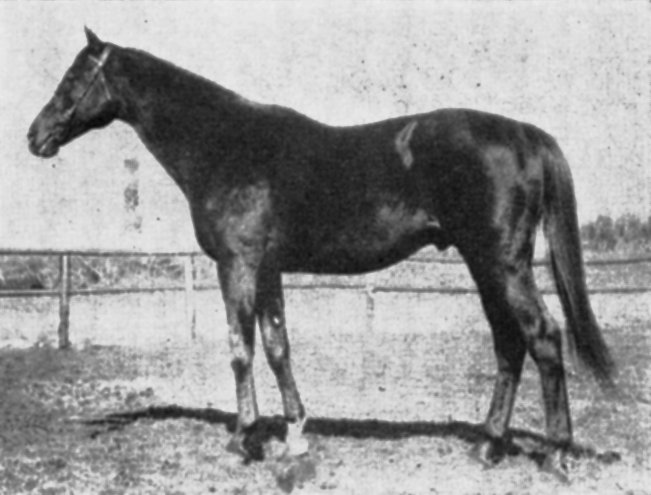
- Sire: Diophon
- Grandsire: Grand Parade
- Dam: Needle Rock
- Damsire: Rock Sand
- Sex: Stallion
- Foaled: 1927
- Died: 1951 (aged 23–24)
- Country: United Kingdom
- Colour: Bay
- Breeder: C W Birkin
- Owner: Hugo Hirst
- Trainer: Fred Templeman
- Record: 13: 5-2-3 (incomplete)
- Earnings: £17,066

Major wins
- Coventry Stakes (1929); Molecomb Stakes (1929); 2000 Guineas (1930)

Awards
- Top-rated British two-year-old (1929)

Diolite (1927 – 1951) was a British Thoroughbred racehorse and sire. He was arguably the best British two-year-old of 1929, when he won three of his five races including the Coventry Stakes and the Molecomb Stakes. In the following year he won the 2000 Guineas and finished third when favourite for the Epsom Derby. He remained in training for another two years but won only one more race. After his retirement from racing he became a very successful breeding stallion in Japan.

== Background ==
Diolite was a "well made" bay horse "of medium size, with a good action" bred by C W Birkin. As a yearling in October 1928 he was offered for sale at Doncaster and bought for 480 guineas by Hugo Hirst. The colt was sent into training with Fred Templeman at Lambourn in Berkshire.

Diolite was probably the best horse sired by Diophon, who won the 2000 Guineas in 1924. Diolite's dam Needle Rock also produced Lady Kroon, the female-line ancestor of Lavandin.

== Racing career ==
=== 1929: two-year-old season ===
Until 1946 two-year-old racehorses in Britain did not have to be officially named and the colt who was to become Diolite was unnamed on his racecourse debut in April 1929 when he finished third to the Aga Khan's Blenheim in the Manton Plate at Newmarket Racecourse. After then finishing second at Goodwood Racecourse he recorded his first success in the Spring Stakes at Newmarket in May. At Royal Ascot in June he started at odds of 7/1 in the Coventry Stakes and won from Lovat Scout. In the following month at Goodwood Racecourse he took the Molecomb Stakes, beating the fillies Qurrat-Al Ain and Grace Dalrymple at odds of 3/1.

In the Free Handicap, a ranking of the season's best juveniles Diolite received a weight of 129 pounds making him the best British two-year-old of 1929 ahead of Press Gang (128), Challenger (127) and Blenheim (126).

=== 1930: three-year-old season ===
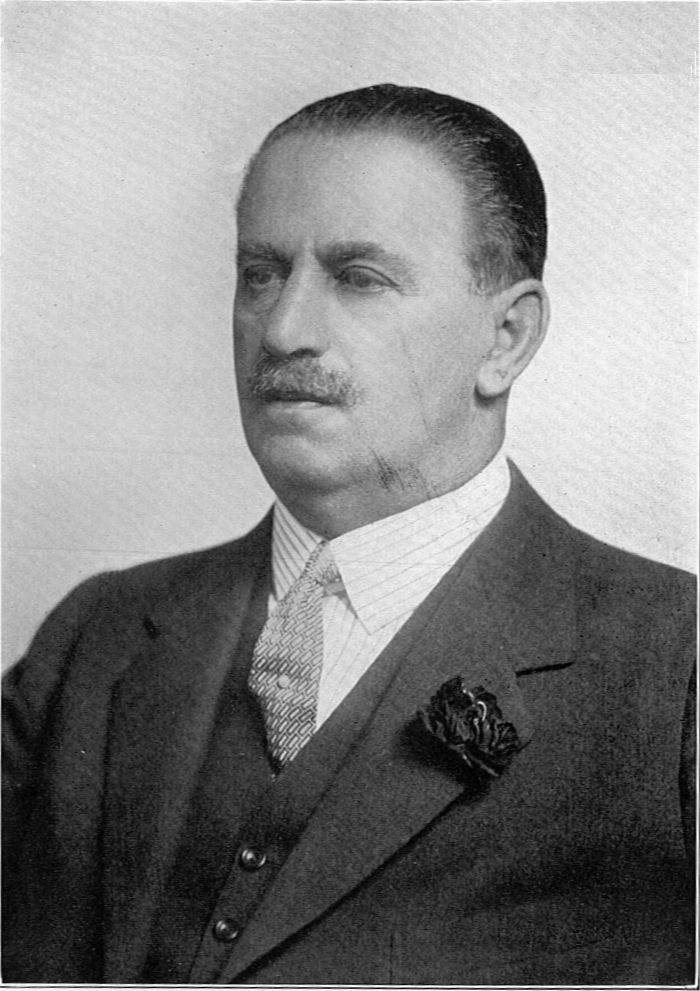
Hugo Hirst, who owned Diolite

On 7 May 1930, Diolite, ridden by Freddie Fox, started at odds of 10/1 in a 28-runner field for the 122nd running 2000 Guineas over the Rowley Mile at Newmarket. The race was attended by the King and attracted enormous betting interest, with a record £9,308 being wagered on The Tote. Fox restrained the colt just behind the leaders before allowing Diolite to sprint clear inside the final furlong and win "easily" by two lengths from Paradine, with Silver Flare a length away in third place. After the race Hugo Hirst commented "I always fancied the chance of Diolite and I was justified. I think he will win the Derby".

In the Derby over 1 1/2 miles at Epsom Racecourse on 4 June Diolite started 11/4 favourite against sixteen opponents, despite doubts about his ability to stay the distance. He was among the leaders for most of the way and took the lead early in the straight but was overtaken in the closing stages and finished third behind Blenheim and Illiad, beaten three lengths by the winner. There were some suggestions that Diolite's jockey C. Day was at fault for going too quickly in the early stages instead of holding the colt up for a late run. At Royal Ascot later in June Diolite was dropped back to sprint distances for the five furlong Fern Hill Stakes and finished third behind Stingo.

Diolite returned for the St Leger over 14 1/2 furlongs at Doncaster Racecourse but appeared to run short of stamina as he came home seventh behind Singapore. A month later the colt finished unplaced behind Rustom Pasha in the Champion Stakes. In November Hirst decline a challenge to send Diolite to Australia for a match race against Phar Lap, suggesting instead that the Australian champion should be sent to England.

=== Later career ===
Diolite remained in training as a four-year-old but failed to recover his best form and recorded his only victory in a handicap race at Liverpool. In April 1931 he finished unplaced in the Great Jubilee Handicap at Kempton Park Racecourse. In October he finished second to the three-year-old Portlaw in the Challenge Stakes at Newmarket, beaten three quarters of a length in a two-runner race. In April 1932 he was strongly fancied for the Lincoln Handicap but finished unplaced behind Jerome Fandor.

== Assessment and honours ==
In their book, A Century of Champions, based on the Timeform rating system, John Randall and Tony Morris rated Diolite an "inferior" winner of the 2000 Guineas.

== Stud record ==
At the end of his racing career Diolite was sold exported to become a breeding stallion in Japan where he was Champion Sire in 1942, 1943 and 1946. The best of his offspring include St Lite, the first Japanese triple crown champion, Hide Hikari (Satsuki Sho), and the Oka Sho winners Umeshiro and Fuku Iwai.

== Pedigree ==
Pedigree of Diolite (GB), bay stallion, 1927
Sire Diophon (GB) 1921	Grand Parade (GB); 1916	Orby	Orme
Sire Diophon (GB) 1921	Grand Parade (GB); 1916	Orby	Rhoda B
Sire Diophon (GB) 1921	Grand Parade (GB); 1916	Grand Geraldine (IRE)	Desmond (GB)
Sire Diophon (GB) 1921	Grand Parade (GB); 1916	Grand Geraldine (IRE)	Grand Marnier (GB)
Sire Diophon (GB) 1921	Donetta (GB); 1900	Donovan	Galopin
Sire Diophon (GB) 1921	Donetta (GB); 1900	Donovan	Mowerina
Sire Diophon (GB) 1921	Donetta (GB); 1900	Rinovata	Wenlock
Sire Diophon (GB) 1921	Donetta (GB); 1900	Rinovata	Traviata
Dam Needle Rock (GB) 1915	Rock Sand (GB); 1910	Sainfoin	Springfield
Dam Needle Rock (GB) 1915	Rock Sand (GB); 1910	Sainfoin	Sanda
Dam Needle Rock (GB) 1915	Rock Sand (GB); 1910	Roquebrune	St Simon
Dam Needle Rock (GB) 1915	Rock Sand (GB); 1910	Roquebrune	St Marguerite
Dam Needle Rock (GB) 1915	Needlepoint (GB); 1908	Isinglass	Isonomy
Dam Needle Rock (GB) 1915	Needlepoint (GB); 1908	Isinglass	Dead Lock
Dam Needle Rock (GB) 1915	Needlepoint (GB); 1908	Etui	Bread Knife
Dam Needle Rock (GB) 1915	Needlepoint (GB); 1908	Etui	Pindi (Family 4-p)
