= My Love (horse) =

French-bred Thoroughbred racehorse

- Sire: Vatellor
- Grandsire: Vatout
- Dam: For My Love
- Damsire: Amfortas
- Sex: Stallion
- Foaled: 1945
- Country: France
- Colour: Bay
- Breeder: Leon Volterra
- Owner: Leon Volterra; Aga Khan III
- Trainer: Richard Carver
- Record: 8: 3-2-1
- Earnings: £

Major wins
- Prix Hocquart (1948); Epsom Derby (1948); Grand Prix de Paris (1948)

My Love (1945–after 1962) was a French Thoroughbred racehorse and sire. In a career that lasted from 1947 to 1948 he ran eight times and won three races. In the summer of 1948 he became the third French-trained horse to win The Derby and the fifth horse to win both the Derby and the Grand Prix de Paris. At the end of the season he was retired to stud but he had little success before or after being exported to Argentina in 1951.

== Background ==
My Love was bred in France by his original owner Leon Volterra, who later sold a half share in the colt to the Aga Khan. The colt was trained at Chantilly by Richard “Dick” Carver an Englishman whose family had been based in France for many years. Carver had never been to Epsom before My Love ran in the 1948 Derby.

My Love’s sire, Vatellor was a high class racehorse who won eight races in France including the race now called the Prix Jean Prat. He later became a successful stallion being Champion sire in France in 1956 and getting such notable performers as Pearl Diver, Nikellora (Prix de l'Arc de Triomphe) and Vattel (Grand Prix de Paris). My Love’s dam, For My Love was bred by Volterra and won two small races, but produced no other horses of importance.

== Racing career ==
=== 1947: two-year-old season ===
My Love provided little evidence of potential as a two-year-old in 1948. He ran twice without winning, although he was beaten only a head on his debut.

=== 1948: three-year-old season ===
In the spring of 1948, My Love ran in the major French middle-distance trial races (Poules des Produits). In April he finished second to Flush Royal in the Prix Noailles over 2200m at Longchamp and then finished third to Rigolo and Flush Royal in the Prix Greffulhe. At this point in the season, My Love was not considered a serious Derby contender and was available at odds of 100/1. On his next start on May 9 he was moved up in distance for the Prix Hocquart over 2400m and showed improved form, winning in "brilliant" style from Turmoil and Flush Royal. Shortly after the race the Aga Khan, reportedly acting on the advice of My Love’s Australian jockey Rae Johnstone, bought a half share in the colt for £15,000.

At Epsom My Love started at 100/9 (approximately 11/1) in a field of thirty-two runners, the largest since 1862. The 2000 Guineas winner My Babu started favourite at 7/2, in front of a crowd estimated at up to 1,000,000 which included the King and the Prime Minister. My Love was held up at the back of the field by Rae Johnstone in the early stages as Tory II made the running. Turning into the straight the French-trained Royal Drake overtook the leader and went clear. Johnstone switched My Love to the outside and the colt produced what was described as a "brilliant burst of speed" to catch Royal Drake well inside the final furlong and win by one and a half lengths with Noor (horse) four lengths further back in third. The second and third placed horses were owned by Volterra and the Aga Khan respectively. Third place finisher Noor would later ship to the United States, set several world time records, defeat the American Triple Crown winner Citation four times, and be elected to the U.S. Racing Hall of Fame.

At the end of June My Love returned to Longchamp for the Grand Prix de Paris, at that time the most valuable race in France ($16,800), for which he was made 2/1 favourite. As at Epsom, he was held up at the rear of the field in the early running before making a "terrific run" in the straight. He became the first horse since Spearmint in 1906 to complete the Derby-Grand Prix double, beating Flush Royal by a length with the Prix du Jockey Club winner Bey in third. In September attempted to complete a unique treble by adding the St Leger at Doncaster. He was strongly fancied in the build-up to the race, with Noor and the improving American-bred Black Tarquin being seen as his most serious rivals. My Love started favourite for a race which, with a prize of £15,368, was the most valuable ever run in Britain but finished unplaced behind Black Tarquin and Alycidon. My Love was then retired to stud.

== Assessment ==
In their book A Century of Champions, John Randall and Tony Morris rated My Love an “average” Derby winner.

== Stud career ==
My Love was based in France for his first three seasons at stud, but the foals he sired in Europe made little impact. He was sold to the Argentinian government in 1951, exported and auctioned in Buenos Aires where he fetched a sum of £46,250. The date of My Love’s death is not recorded, but his last foals would appear to have been conceived in either 1962 or 1963.

== Pedigree ==
Pedigree of My Love (FR), bay stallion, 1945
Sire Vatellor (FR) 1933	Vatout; 1926	Prince Chimay	Chaucer
Sire Vatellor (FR) 1933	Vatout; 1926	Prince Chimay	Gallorette
Sire Vatellor (FR) 1933	Vatout; 1926	Vashti	Sans Souci
Sire Vatellor (FR) 1933	Vatout; 1926	Vashti	Vaya
Sire Vatellor (FR) 1933	Lady Elinor; 1919	Teddy*	Ajax
Sire Vatellor (FR) 1933	Lady Elinor; 1919	Teddy*	Rondeau
Sire Vatellor (FR) 1933	Lady Elinor; 1919	Madame Royale	Tarquin
Sire Vatellor (FR) 1933	Lady Elinor; 1919	Madame Royale	Royal Abbess
Dam For My Love (FR) 1936	Amfortas; 1927	Ksar	Bruleur
Dam For My Love (FR) 1936	Amfortas; 1927	Ksar	Kizil Kourgan
Dam For My Love (FR) 1936	Amfortas; 1927	Persephone	Teddy*
Dam For My Love (FR) 1936	Amfortas; 1927	Persephone	Persistent
Dam For My Love (FR) 1936	Najmi; 1921	Grand Parade	Orby
Dam For My Love (FR) 1936	Najmi; 1921	Grand Parade	Grand Geraldine
Dam For My Love (FR) 1936	Najmi; 1921	Chivalry	Amadis
Dam For My Love (FR) 1936	Najmi; 1921	Chivalry	Far Nell (Family: 7-b)

* My Love is inbred 3S x 4D to the stallion Teddy, meaning that he appears third generation on the sire side of his pedigree and fourth generation on the dam side of his pedigree.
