= Diophon =

British-bred Thoroughbred racehorse

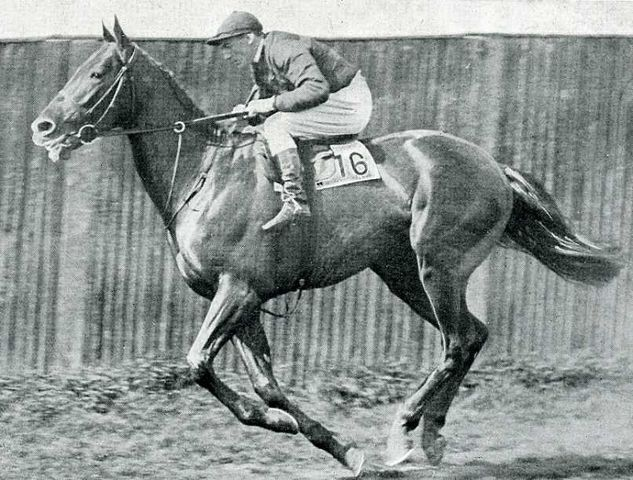
- Diophon in action
- Sire: Grand Parade
- Grandsire: Orby
- Dam: Donnetta
- Damsire: Donovan
- Sex: Stallion
- Foaled: 1921
- Country: United Kingdom
- Colour: Chestnut
- Breeder: Edgar Vincent, 1st Viscount D'Abernon
- Owner: Aga Khan III
- Trainer: Dick Dawson
- Record: 15: 8-5-1
- Earnings: £23,182

Major wins
- July Stakes (1923); Chesterfield Stakes (1923); Lavant Stakes (1923); Middle Park Stakes (1923); 2000 Guineas (1924); Newbury Royal Plate (1925); Atlantic Cup (1925); Great Midland Breeders' Plate (1925)

Diophon (1921 – after 1935) was a British Thoroughbred racehorse and sire. He was probably the best two-year-old colt of his generation in England in 1923 when he won four of his five races including the July Stakes Lavant Stakes and Middle Park Stakes. In the following spring he gave his owner Aga Khan III the first of his many classic wins when he took the 2000 Guineas. He failed to win again that year but returned to take three valuable prizes in 1925. After his retirement from racing he had some success as a breeding stallion.

== Background ==
Diophon was a "handsome" chestnut horse bred in England by Edgar Vincent, 1st Viscount D'Abernon. As a yearling he was put up for auction at Doncaster and bought for 4000 guineas by George Lambton on behalf of the Aga Khan. The colt was sent into training with Dick Dawson at Whatcombe, near Lambourn in Berkshire.

He was from the first crop of foals sired by the 1919 Derby winner Grand Parade, the rest of whose stud career was disappointing. Diophon's dam Donetta was a durable racemare who competed until the age of six before becoming a very successful broodmare, with her other foals including Diadem, Dionysos (Irish St Leger) and Diadumenos (Jubilee Handicap).

== Racing career ==
=== 1923: two-year-old season ===
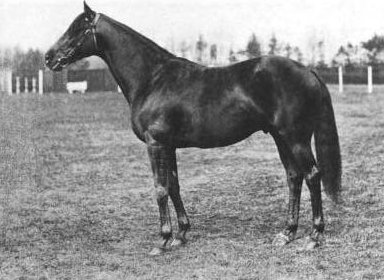
Diophon's sire Grand Parade

Diophon made a successful racecourse debut in the July Stakes at Newmarket Racecourse in which he was ridden George Hulme and won at odds of 7/1 from Obliterate. At the next Newmarket meeting he was allowed to walk over in the Chesterfield Stakes when no horses appeared to oppose him and then took the Lavant Stakes at Goodwood Racecourse. Despite conceding weight to his seven opponents, Diophon started favourite for the Hopeful Stakes at Newmarket in early October but sustained his first defeat as he was beaten a head into second place by the previously unraced Woodend.

Two weeks later, in "dismal weather conditions", Diophon started 2/1 favourite in an eleven-runner field for the Middle Park Plate over six furlongs at the same track. He won by one and a half lengths from Plack, a filly who went on to win the 1000 Guineas, with Knight of the Garter third and Woodend unplaced.

Although Diophon was considered a leading contender for the following year's British Classic Races he was regarded as being inferior to his female stablemate Mumtaz Mahal.

=== 1924: three-year-old season ===
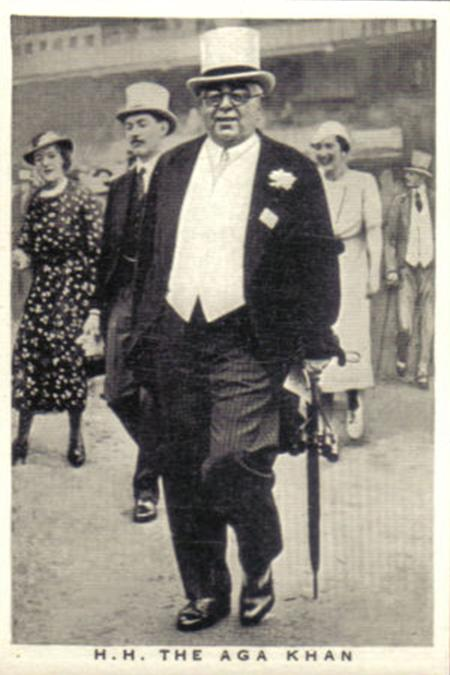
Diophon's owner Aga Khan III

On 7 May, with Hulme in the saddle, Diophon started at odds of 11/2 in a twenty-runner field for the 116th running of the 2000 Guineas over the Rowley Mile course at Newmarket. In a very close finish, which saw the leaders racing up opposite sides of the wide Newmarket track, he was adjudged to have won by a head from Bright Knight with Green Fire a neck away in third. The photo-finish camera was not used in England at that time and most of the spectators disagreed with the judge's decision, believing that Bright Knight had crossed the line in front. The runner-up's jockey, Frank Bullock, stated that he was certain that he had won the race by at least a length. Diophon's victory provided a first classic success for both his owner and jockey.

The 1924 Derby Stakes was run in exceptionally wet and testing conditions at Epsom Racecourse on 4 June. Despite doubts about his ability to cope with the heavy ground, Diophon was strongly fancied, but was never in contention and finished unplaced behind Sansovino who won easily. At Royal Ascot he ran in the Ribblesdale Stakes (then a race open to both colts and fillies) and finished second to Live Wire. In the Sussex Stakes at Goodwood in August Diophon initially refused to go down to the start and had to be led by a mounted policeman. He took the lead in the straight but was overtaken in the closing stages and beaten by Burslem, leading to speculation that he was not "in love with racing".

=== 1925: four-year-old season ===
On 4 May 1925 Diophon contested the Lingfield Park Spring Stakes and finished second, beaten a head by Sansovino, with the Argentinian colt El Cacique three lengths back in third. At Newbury Racecourse on 10 June he was assigned a weight of 140 pounds for the Royal Plate and won from Glommen and Invershin despite struggling to obtain a clear run in the straight. It was said by the Sporting Life that "no horse could have battled more heartily" and that the impression that he sometimes gave less than his best effort was created by the colt's oddly-set ears. He then finished second to Caravel in the Rous Memorial Stakes over one mile at Royal Ascot, beaten a head in a "great finish". In the Eclipse Stakes at Sandown Park on 17 July he came home third behind Polyphontes and Zambo in a thirteen-runner field. In the same month he won the £2595 Atlantic Cup at Liverpool. In August Diophon added an "easy" win in the Great Midland Breeders' Plate over ten furlongs at Nottingham Racecourse.

== Assessment and honours ==
In their book, A Century of Champions, based on the Timeform rating system, John Randall and Tony Morris rated Diophon an "inferior" winner of the 2000 Guineas.

== Stud record ==
Diophon was retired from racing at the end of his four-year-old season to become a breeding stallion. The best of his offspring were Diolite, who won the 2000 Guineas in 1930 and the Irish Oaks winner Theresina. His overall record was disappointing and he was sold and exported to Greece.

== Pedigree ==
Pedigree of Diophon (GB), chestnut stallion, 1921
Sire Grand Parade (GB) 1916	Orby (GB); 1904	Orme	Ormonde
Sire Grand Parade (GB) 1916	Orby (GB); 1904	Orme	Angelica
Sire Grand Parade (GB) 1916	Orby (GB); 1904	Rhoda B (USA)	Hanover
Sire Grand Parade (GB) 1916	Orby (GB); 1904	Rhoda B (USA)	Margerine
Sire Grand Parade (GB) 1916	Grand Geraldine (IRE); 1905	Desmond (GB)	St Simon
Sire Grand Parade (GB) 1916	Grand Geraldine (IRE); 1905	Desmond (GB)	L'Abbesse de Jouarre
Sire Grand Parade (GB) 1916	Grand Geraldine (IRE); 1905	Grand Marnier (GB)	Friar's Balsam
Sire Grand Parade (GB) 1916	Grand Geraldine (IRE); 1905	Grand Marnier (GB)	sister to Helena
Dam Donnetta (GB) 1900	Donovan (GB); 1886	Galopin	Vedette
Dam Donnetta (GB) 1900	Donovan (GB); 1886	Galopin	Flying Duchess
Dam Donnetta (GB) 1900	Donovan (GB); 1886	Mowerina	Scottish Chief
Dam Donnetta (GB) 1900	Donovan (GB); 1886	Mowerina	Stockings
Dam Donnetta (GB) 1900	Rinovata (GB); 1887	Wenlock	Lord Clifden
Dam Donnetta (GB) 1900	Rinovata (GB); 1887	Wenlock	Mineral
Dam Donnetta (GB) 1900	Rinovata (GB); 1887	Traviata	Cremorne
Dam Donnetta (GB) 1900	Rinovata (GB); 1887	Traviata	The White Lady (Family 2-n)
