= Coventry Stakes =

Flat horse race in Britain

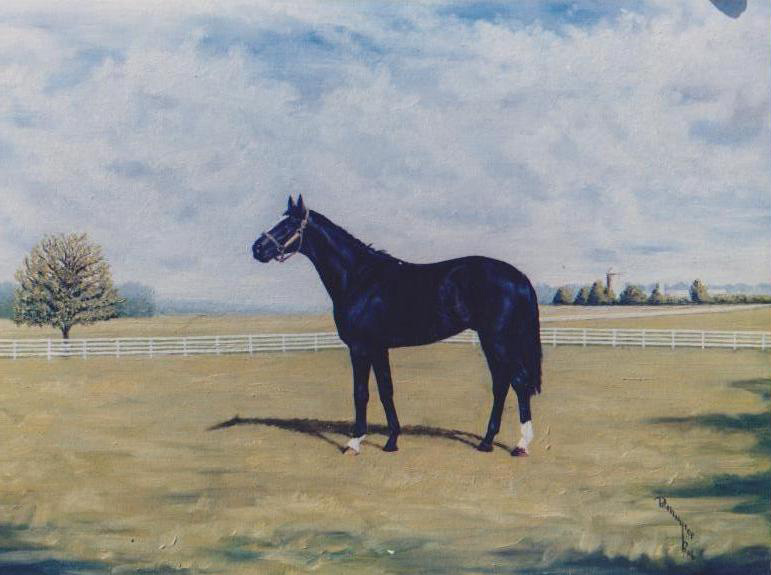
- Chief Singer, 1983 winner, painted by Bob Demuyser oil on canvas
- Class: Group 2
- Location: Ascot Racecourse; Ascot, England
- Inaugurated: 1890
- Race type: Flat / Thoroughbred
- Website: Ascot

Race information
- Distance: 6f (1,207 metres)
- Surface: Turf
- Track: Straight
- Qualification: Two-year-olds
- Weight: 9 st 3 lb Allowances; 3 lb for fillies
- Purse: £175,000 (2025); 1st: £99,243

Coventry Stakes
2026
Great Barrier Reef	Adaay Of Scarlett	Royal Heritage

Previous years
2025
Gstaad	Do Or Do Not	Coppull
2024
Rashabar	Electrolyte	Columnist
2023
River Tiber	Army Ethos	Bucanero Fuerte
2022
Bradsell	Persian Force	Royal Scotsman
2021
Berkshire Shadow	Eldrickjones	Vintage Clarets

2020-2011
2020
Nando Parrado	Qaader	Saeiqa
2019
Arizona	Threat	Guildsman
2018
Calyx	Advertise	Sergei Prokofiev
2017
Rajasinghe	Headway	Murillo
2016
Caravaggio	Mehmas	Psychedelic Funk
2015
Buratino	Air Force Blue	Eltezam
2014
The Wow Signal	Cappella Sansevero	Jungle Cat
2013
War Command	Parbold	Sir John Hawkins
2012
Dawn Approach	Olympic Glory	Cristoforo Colombo
2011
Power	Roman Soldier	St Barths

2010-2001
2010
Strong Suit	Elzaam	Roayh
2009
Canford Cliffs	Xtension	Rakaan
2008
Art Connoisseur	Intense Focus	Lord Shanakill
2007
Henrythenavigator	Swiss Franc	Luck Money
2006
Hellvelyn	Major Cadeaux	Tariq
2005
Red Clubs	Pacific Pride	Amadeus Wolf
2004
Iceman	Council Member	Capable Guest
2003
Three Valleys	Botanical	Privy Seal
2002
Statue Of Liberty	Pakhoes	Kawagino
2001
Landseer	Firebreak	Meshaheer

2000-1991
2000
Cd Europe	Bram Stoker	Modigliani
1999
Fasliyev	Red Pepper	Cornelius
1998
Red Sea	Be The Chief	Access All Areas
1997
Harbour Master	Desert Prince	Bold Fact
1996
Verglas	Daylight In Dubai	Deadly Dudley
1995
Royal Applause	Russian Revival	South Salem
1994
Sri Pekan	Moon King	Missel
1993
Stonehatch	Polish Laughter	Wajiba Riva
1992
Petardia	So Factual	Pips Pride
1991
Dilum	Dr Devious	Casteddu

1990-1988
1990
Mac's Imp	Generous	Bold Nephew
1989
Rock City	Wadood	Candy Glen
1988
High Estate	Dancing Dissident	Sharp N' Early

The Coventry Stakes is a Group 2 flat horse race in Great Britain open to two-year-old horses. It is run at Ascot over a distance of 6 furlongs (1,207 metres), and it is scheduled to take place each year in June.

== History ==
The event was established in 1890, and it was named after the 9th Earl of Coventry, who served as the Master of the Buckhounds at that time.

The present system of race grading was introduced in 1971, and for a period the Coventry Stakes was classed at Group 3 level. It was promoted to Group 2 status in 2004. It is usually contested on the opening day of the Royal Ascot meeting.

== Records ==
Leading jockey (9 wins):

- Sir Gordon Richards – Manitoba (1932), Medieval Knight (1933), Hairan (1934), Nasrullah (1942), Khaled (1945), Tudor Minstrel (1946), The Cobbler (1947), Palestine (1949), King's Bench (1951)

Leading trainer (12 wins):

- Aidan O'Brien - Harbour Master (1997), Fasliyev (1999), Landseer (2001), Statue of Liberty (2002), Henrythenavigator (2007), Power (2011), War Command (2013), Caravaggio (2016), Arizona (2019), River Tiber (2023), Gstaad (2025), Great Barrier Reef (2026)

== Winners ==
Year	Winner	Jockey	Trainer	Time
1890	The Deemster	William Robinson	James Jewitt
1891	Dunure	Tom Cannon Sr.	Jimmy Ryan
1892	Milford	John Watts	Joe Cannon
1893	Ladas	Alfred White	Mathew Dawson
1894	Whiston	Seth Chandley	James Waugh
1895	Persimmon	John Watts	Richard Marsh
1896	Goletta	Tommy Loates	Alfred Heyhoe
1897	Orzil	Walter Bradford	Tom Jenning Jr.
1898	Desmond	Tommy Loates	Robert Louis Sherwood
1899	Democrat	Tod Sloan	John Huggins
1900	Good Morning	Lester Reiff	Sam Darling	1:14.80
1901	Sterling Balm	Otto Madden	Jack Watts
1902	Rock Sand	Danny Maher	George Blackwell	1:18.00
1903	St Amant	Kempton Cannon	Alfred Heyhoe
1904	Cicero	Danny Maher	Percy Peck
1905	Black Arrow	Herbert Jones	William Robinson
1906	Traquair	Danny Maher	Percy Peck
1907	Prospector	Henry Stokes	Sir C Nugent	1:05.20
1908	Louviers	George Stern	D Waugh
1909	Admiral Hawke	Bernard Dillon	Peter Gilpin	1:02.60
1910	Radiancy	Walter Griggs	Charles Morton
1911	Lady Americus	Steve Donoghue	Atty Persse
1912	Shogun	Frank Wootton	Richard Wootton	1:05.40
1913	The Tetrarch	Steve Donoghue	Atty Persse	1:02.80
1914	Lady Josephine	Steve Donoghue	Fallon
1915 (Note: The race was run at Newmarket from 1915 to 1918)	Marcus	Herbert Jones	John Dawson
1916	Diadem	Skeets Martin	George Lambton	1:02.40
1917	Benevente	Skeets Martin	Captain Dewhurst
1918	Bruff Bridge	Jack Evans	Captain Dewhurst
1919	Sarchedon	Skeets Martin	Peter Gilpin
1920	Milesius	Bernard Carslake	Harry Cottrill	1:04.20
1921	Pondoland	Joe Shatwell	Eddie de Mestre	1:01.80
1922	Drake	Albert Whalley	Harry Cottrill	1:03.00
1923	Knight Of The Garter	Herbert Jones	Richard Marsh	1:03.60
1924	Iceberg	Freddy Lane	Ralph Moreton	1:03.00
1925	Colorado	Tommy Weston	George Lambton	1:03.20
1926	Knight Of The Grail	Bernard Carslake	Robert Farquharson	1:25.20
1927	Fairway	Tommy Weston	Frank Butters	1:01.40
1928	Reflector	Richard Perryman	John Watson	1:05.60
1929	Diolite	Cecil Ray	Fred Templeman	1:03.60
1930	Lemnarchus	Freddie Fox	Fred Darling	1:02.20
1931	Cockpen	Freddie Fox	Fred Darling	1:03.60
1932	Manitoba	Sir Gordon Richards	Fred Darling	1:01.40
1933	Medieval Knight	Sir Gordon Richards	Fred Darling	1:04.00
1934	Hairan	Sir Gordon Richards	Frank Butters	1:03.80
1935	Black Speck	Tommy Burns Sr.	Harry Cottrill	1:06.00
1936	Early School	Bobby Dick	Joseph Lawson	1:03.00
1937	Mirza II	Charlie Smirke	Frank Butters	1:03.00
1938	Panorama	Rufus Beasley	Cecil Boyd-Rochfort	1:03.40
1939	Turkhan	Charlie Smirke	Frank Butters	1:03.60
1940	no race
1941 (Note: The race was run at Newmarket from 1941 to 1944)	Big Game	Harry Wragg	Fred Darling	1:00.00
1942	Nasrullah	Sir Gordon Richards	Frank Butters	1:00.20
1943	Orestes	Tommy Carey	Walter Nightingall	1:01.60
1944	Dante	Billy Nevett	Matthew Peacock	0:59.20
1945	Khaled	Sir Gordon Richards	Frank Butters	1:03.00
1946	Tudor Minstrel	Sir Gordon Richards	Fred Darling	1:04.00
1947	The Cobbler	Sir Gordon Richards	Fred Darling	1:03.20
1948	Royal Forest	Cliff Richards	Noel Murless	1:03.80
1949	Palestine	Sir Gordon Richards	Frank Butters	1:03.60
1950	Big Dipper	Harry Carr	Cecil Boyd-Rochfort	1:05.20
1951	King's Bench	Sir Gordon Richards	Matt Feakes	1:04.00
1952	Whistler	Edgar Britt	Peter Nelson	1:03.20
1953	The Pie King	Tommy Gosling	Paddy Prendergast	1:04.40
1954	Noble Chieftain	Frank Barlow	Humphrey Cottrill	1:07.20
1955	Ratification	Harry Carr	Vic Smyth	1:17.80
1956	Messmate	Manny Mercer	Jack Jarvis	1:20.35
1957	Amerigo	Eph Smith	John Waugh	1:15.22
1958	Hieroglyph	Harry Carr	Cecil Boyd-Rochfort	1:16.88
1959	Martial	Wally Swinburn	Paddy Prendergast	1:17.20
1960	Typhoon	Ron Hutchinson	Paddy Prendergast	1:22.21
1961	Xerxes	Doug Smith	Geoffrey Brooke	1:19.50
1962	Crocket	Doug Smith	Geoffrey Brooke	1:19.02
1963	Showdown	Doug Smith	Fred Winter Snr.	1:24.09
1964	Silly Season	Geoff Lewis	Ian Balding	1:20.12
1965	Young Emperor	Lester Piggott	Paddy Prendergast	1:17.59
1966	Bold Lad	Des Lake	Paddy Prendergast	1:16.56
1967	Mark Royal	Scobie Breasley	P Norris	1:17.84
1968	Murrayfield	Geoff Lewis	Ian Balding	1:17.21
1969	Prince Tenderfoot	Bill Williamson	Paddy Prendergast	1:16.99
1970	Mill Reef	Geoff Lewis	Ian Balding	1:16.16
1971	Sun Prince	Joe Mercer	Dick Hern	1:23.19
1972	Perdu	Jimmy Lindley	Atty Corbett	1:17.59
1973	Doleswood	Frankie Durr	Reg Akehurst	1:17.23
1974	Whip It Quick	Geoff Lewis	Bill Marshall	1:18.35
1975	Galway Bay	Lester Piggott	Ian Balding	1:17.16
1976	Cawston's Clown	Taffy Thomas	Neil Adam	1:16.96
1977	Solinus	Lester Piggott	Vincent O'Brien	1:18.90
1978	Lake City	Brian Taylor	Ryan Price	1:16.76
1979	Varingo	Brian Taylor	Ryan Price	1:15.45
1980	Recitation	Greville Starkey	Guy Harwood	1:18.22
1981	Red Sunset	Greville Starkey	Guy Harwood	1:16.32
1982	Horage	Pat Eddery	Matt McCormack	1:15.52
1983	Chief Singer	Ray Cochrane	Ron Sheather	1:16.00
1984	Primo Dominie	John Reid	Brian Swift	1:15.36
1985	Sure Blade	Brent Thomson	Barry Hills	1:14.83
1986	Cutting Blade	Cash Asmussen	Lester Piggott	1:17.14
1987	Always Fair	Walter Swinburn	Michael Stoute	1:17.49
1988	High Estate	Steve Cauthen	Henry Cecil	1:13.80
1989	Rock City	Willie Carson	Richard Hannon Sr.	1:15.02
1990	Mac's Imp	Alan Munro	Bill O'Gorman	1:15.69
1991	Dilum	Alan Munro	Paul Cole	1:15.99
1992	Petardia	Walter Swinburn	Geoff Wragg	1:13.95
1993	Stonehatch	John Reid	Peter Chapple-Hyam	1:18.15
1994	Sri Pekan	Richard Quinn	Paul Cole	1:15.24
1995	Royal Applause	Walter Swinburn	Barry Hills	1:15.26
1996	Verglas	Willie Supple	Kevin Prendergast	1:14.34
1997	Harbour Master	Christy Roche	Aidan O'Brien	1:14.45
1998	Red Sea	Richard Quinn	Paul Cole	1:17.58
1999	Fasliyev	Michael Kinane	Aidan O'Brien	1:14.59
2000	Cd Europe	Steve Drowne	Mick Channon	1:16.97
2001	Landseer	Jamie Spencer	Aidan O'Brien	1:15.62
2002	Statue of Liberty	Michael Kinane	Aidan O'Brien	1:15.73
2003	Three Valleys	Richard Hughes	Roger Charlton	1:13.62
2004	Iceman	Kieren Fallon	John Gosden	1:14.83
2005 (Note: The 2005 running took place at York)	Red Clubs	Michael Hills	Barry Hills	1:10.91
2006	Hellvelyn	Ted Durcan	Bryan Smart	1:14.51
2007	Henrythenavigator	Michael Kinane	Aidan O'Brien	1:12.46
2008	Art Connoisseur	Jamie Spencer	Michael Bell	1:13.59
2009	Canford Cliffs	Richard Hughes	Richard Hannon Sr.	1:13.64
2010	Strong Suit	Richard Hughes	Richard Hannon Sr.	1:14.29
2011	Power	Ryan Moore	Aidan O'Brien	1:13.55
2012	Dawn Approach	Kevin Manning	Jim Bolger	1:13.64
2013	War Command	Seamie Heffernan	Aidan O'Brien	1:12.86
2014	The Wow Signal	Frankie Dettori	John Quinn	1:12.99
2015	Buratino	William Buick	Mark Johnston	1:13.11
2016	Caravaggio	Ryan Moore	Aidan O'Brien	1:16.36
2017	Rajasinghe	Stevie Donohoe	Richard Spencer	1:12.39
2018	Calyx	Frankie Dettori	John Gosden	1:13.51
2019	Arizona	Ryan Moore	Aidan O'Brien	1:13.02
2020	Nando Parrado	Adam Kirby	Clive Cox	1:15.21
2021	Berkshire Shadow	Oisin Murphy	Andrew Balding	1:13.55
2022	Bradsell	Hollie Doyle	Archie Watson	1:13.02
2023	River Tiber	Ryan Moore	Aidan O'Brien	1:15.49
2024	Rashabar	Billy Loughnane	Brian Meehan	1:13.90
2025	Gstaad	Ryan Moore	Aidan O'Brien	1:13.43
2026	Great Barrier Reef	Wayne Lordan	Aidan O'Brien	1:13.14

== See also ==
- Horse racing in Great Britain
- List of British flat horse races
