= Diadem (horse) =

British-bred Thoroughbred racehorse

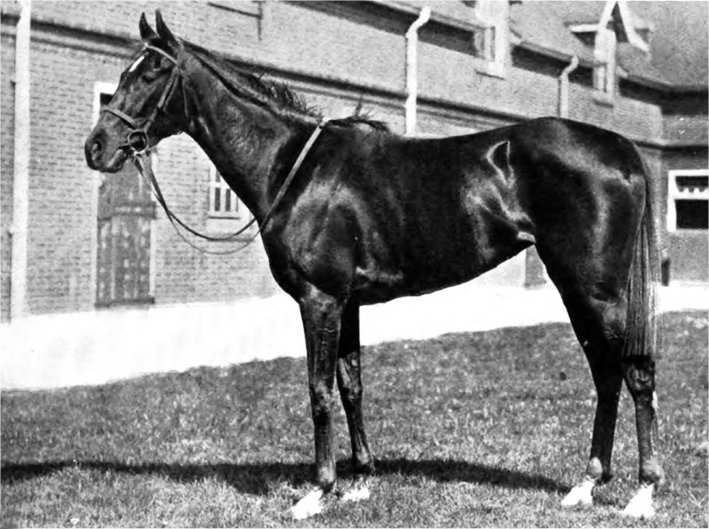
- Diadem in 1917.
- Sire: Orby
- Grandsire: Orme
- Dam: Donnetta
- Damsire: Donovan
- Sex: Mare
- Foaled: 1914
- Country: Great Britain
- Colour: Chestnut
- Breeder: 1st Baron d'Abernon
- Owner: 1st Baron d'Abernon
- Trainer: George Lambton
- Record: 39 starts 24 wins

Major wins
- New Coventry Stakes (1916); Moulton Stakes (1916); 1000 Guineas (1917); King's Stand Stakes (1919, 1920); July Cup (1919, 1920); Challenge Stakes (1919); Rous Memorial Stakes (1920); All-Aged Stakes (1920)

Honours
- Diadem Stakes at Ascot Racecourse

Diadem (1914–1931) was a British Thoroughbred racehorse who won the 1000 Guineas in 1917. She went on to become a top sprinter, recording two victories in both the King's Stand Stakes and the July Cup. In total she won 24 of her 39 races. Diadem was bred and owned by Edgar Vincent, 1st Viscount D'Abernon, and trained by George Lambton. The Diadem Stakes at Ascot Racecourse was named after her.

== Background ==
Diadem was a chestnut filly bred by Edgar Vincent, 1st Viscount D'Abernon and foaled in 1914. She was sired by Epsom Derby and Irish Derby winner Orby. As a stallion Orby sired Derby winner Grand Parade and Champion Stakes winner Orpheus. Diadem's dam was Donnetta, a daughter of Donovan.

== Racing career ==
=== 1916: Two-year-old season ===
Diadem won the New Coventry Stakes at Newmarket by two lengths from Golden Maid. She then won the five-furlong Fulbourne Stakes at Newmarket by three lengths from Sunset Glow. At the end of the year she also won the five-furlong Moulton Stakes at Newmarket.

=== 1917: Three-year-old season ===
In May she won the 1000 Guineas after starting as the 6/4 favourite. Sunny Jane finished second, with Nonpareil in third. At Newmarket she finished unplaced in the New Derby that was won by Gay Crusader. She started as the favourite for the New Oaks. The filly Sunny Jane took the lead of the race with four furlongs left to run and was then challenged by Diadem. Sunny Jane held off Diadem to win by half a length, with Moravia a further four lengths back in third place. In October she won the six-furlong Great Eastern Railway Handicap at Newmarket, beating Roscius by half a length.

=== 1918: Four-year-old season ===
In May 1918, Diadem won the Salford Borough Handicap at Manchester by half a length from Golly Eyes. She was carrying 10 pounds more weight than any of the other horses in the field. In October she won the Snailwell Stakes after starting as the odds-on favourite. Later in the month she finished third in the Champion Stakes, three and a half lengths behind winner My Dear.

=== 1919: Five-year-old season ===
At Royal Ascot in 1919 Diadem started as the 7/2, fourth favourite for the King's Stand Stakes. She won the race by two lengths from favourite Best Born. In July she beat Iron Hand by three lengths to win the July Cup at Newmarket. At Goodwood she started in the King George Stakes, but another runner, Sun d'Or cut across her at the start and she was never in contention, cantering home behind winner Chiffre d'Amour and two others. At the Doncaster St. Leger meeting she carried top weight and started favourite for the seven-furlong Town Moor Handicap. She took the lead with a quarter of a mile still to run and despite being challenged in the closing stages, she held on the win by a head from Quadrille. In October Diadem beat her only opponent, Freesia, by three quarters of a length to win the Challenge Stakes. Later in the month she finished second of eighteen in the Cambridgeshire Stakes, six lengths behind winner Brigand.

=== 1920: Six-year-old season ===
In June 1920 she walked over for the Rous Memorial Stakes at Ascot. She also won the All-Aged Stakes by six lengths from her only rival, Tetramenter. The following day she recorded her second victory in the King's Stand Stakes., before walking over for her second July Cup. In July she finished second in Molyneux Plate, two lengths behind Racket. She had her third walk over of the year in September for the Snailwell Stakes. In October she won the Thames Stakes at Kempton by three lengths from Prince Umbria, before finishing third in the Champion Stakes, seven lengths behind winner Orpheus.

=== 1921: Seven-year-old season ===
In June 1921 Diadem finished fourth in the Royal Stakes at Epsom, behind winner Orby's Pride. Later in the month she finished second behind Monarch in the Rous Memorial Stakes at Ascot.

== Assessment ==
In 1918 she was described as "one of the most brilliant sprinters seen in England for very many years." She finished her career with 24 wins from 39 starts. In 1946 Ascot Racecourse named a new sprint race in her honour, the Diadem Stakes, which is now known as the British Champions Sprint Stakes.

== Breeding record ==
Diadem was retired to become a broodmare. In 1928 one of her foals, Dian, was sold for 14,000 guineas. At the same auction Diadem herself was purchased by Major Mairs for 10,000 guineas. Diadem died in 1931.

== Pedigree ==
Pedigree of Diadem, chestnut mare, 1914
Sire Orby (GB) ch. 1904	Orme b. 1889	Ormonde b. 1883	Bend Or
Sire Orby (GB) ch. 1904	Orme b. 1889	Ormonde b. 1883	Lily Agnes
Sire Orby (GB) ch. 1904	Orme b. 1889	Angelica b. 1879	Galopin*
Sire Orby (GB) ch. 1904	Orme b. 1889	Angelica b. 1879	St. Angela
Sire Orby (GB) ch. 1904	Rhoda B. br. 1895	Hanover ch. 1884	Hindoo
Sire Orby (GB) ch. 1904	Rhoda B. br. 1895	Hanover ch. 1884	Bourbon Belle
Sire Orby (GB) ch. 1904	Rhoda B. br. 1895	Margerine b. 1886	Algerine
Sire Orby (GB) ch. 1904	Rhoda B. br. 1895	Margerine b. 1886	Sweet Songstress
Dam Donnetta (GB) b. 1900	Donovan b. 1886	Galopin* b. 1872	Vedette
Dam Donnetta (GB) b. 1900	Donovan b. 1886	Galopin* b. 1872	Flying Duchess
Dam Donnetta (GB) b. 1900	Donovan b. 1886	Mowerina ch. 1876	The Scottish Chief
Dam Donnetta (GB) b. 1900	Donovan b. 1886	Mowerina ch. 1876	Stockings
Dam Donnetta (GB) b. 1900	Rinovata b. 1887	Wenlock b. 1869	Lord Clifden
Dam Donnetta (GB) b. 1900	Rinovata b. 1887	Wenlock b. 1869	Mineral
Dam Donnetta (GB) b. 1900	Rinovata b. 1887	Traviata b. 1881	Cremorne
Dam Donnetta (GB) b. 1900	Rinovata b. 1887	Traviata b. 1881	The White Lady

Note: b. = Bay, br. = Brown, ch. = Chestnut

* Diadem was inbred 3x4 to Galopin. This means that the stallion appears once in the third generation and once in the fourth generation of her pedigree.
