= Kumohata =

Japanese Thoroughbred racehorse (1936–1953)

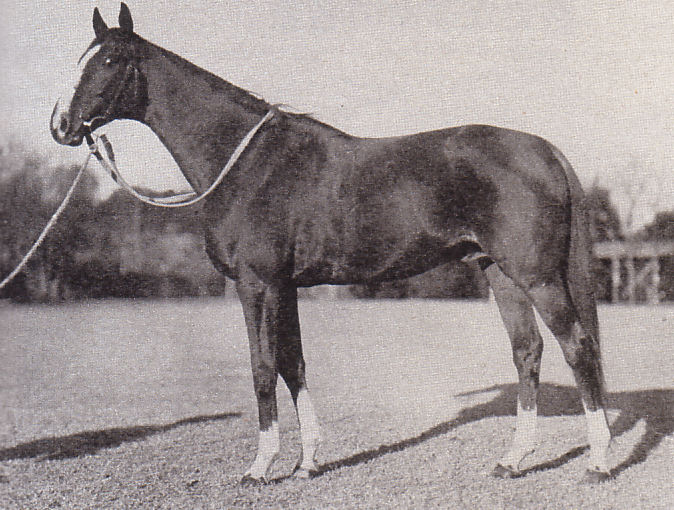
- Breed: Thoroughbred
- Sire: Tournesol
- Grandsire: Gainsborough
- Dam: Fairy Maiden
- Damsire: Gnome
- Sex: Stallion
- Foaled: 4 March 1936
- Died: 10 September 1953 (aged 17); Hidaka, Hokkaido, Japan
- Country: Japan
- Colour: Chestnut
- Breeder: Shimofusa Imperial Stud
- Owner: Yusaku Kato
- Trainer: Waiichiro Tanaka
- Jockey: Shōtarō Abe
- Record: 21: 9-4-4
- Earnings: ¥74,414

Major wins
- Tōkyō Yūshun (1939)

Awards
- Leading sire in Japan (1952–1957)

Honors
- Japan Racing Association Hall of Fame (1984); Kumohata Kinen

Kumohata (Japanese: クモハタ, Kumohata; 4 March 1936 – 10 September 1953) was a Japanese Thoroughbred racehorse and sire. He won the 8th Tōkyō Yūshun (Japanese Derby) in 1939, nine days after his racecourse debut. He was the Leading Sire in Japan for six consecutive years from 1952 to 1957, the first domestically-bred stallion to achieve this. He was inducted into the JRA Hall of Fame in 1984.

== Background ==
Kumohata was a chestnut colt bred at the government-operated Shimofusa Imperial Stud in Narita, Chiba Prefecture. He was sired by Tournesol, a British-bred stallion by Gainsborough, and his dam was Fairy Maiden (星旗), an American-bred mare by Gnome. His half-sister Cleopatra Thomas (クレオパトラトマス) won the Teishitsu Goshoten. He was sold at auction for ¥37,600, the highest price at the sale, to owner Yusaku Kato. He was trained by Waiichiro Tanaka at Tokyo Racecourse.

== Racing career ==
=== 1939: three-year-old season ===
Kumohata did not debut until 20 May 1939, having been delayed by thrush in all four hooves. He finished second in a newcomer race at Tokyo Racecourse over 2300 metres. Six days later, he won a newcomer race over 1800 metres on heavy ground.

Two days after that, on 28 May, he contested the 8th Tōkyō Yūshun (Japanese Derby) over 2400 metres on heavy ground in a field of twenty. Ridden by Shōtarō Abe, he was the 8th choice in the betting. He raced at the rear before advancing on the inside rail on the final turn and overtook Richmond in the final 50 metres to win by 0.5 seconds. His debut-to-Derby interval of nine days remains the shortest in the race's history.

After the Derby, Kumohata finished seventh in a handicap at Yokohama in October, third in a four-year-old handicap, and third in the Yokohama Nōrinshō Shōten behind Sugenuma. He won two open races at Tokyo in November, finished second at Nakayama Racecourse, and won again at Nakayama. He finished the season with five wins from eleven starts.

=== 1940: four-year-old season ===
Kumohata won a handicap at Hanshin Racecourse on 10 May and finished third in the Teishitsu Goshoten (Spring) over 3200 metres on dirt on 19 May. He won the Tokyo Five-Year-Old Special on 27 May and an open race at Tokyo on 9 June. In autumn, he won an open race at Yokohama on 14 October but finished second in the Yokohama Nōrinshō Shōten and second in the Teishitsu Goshoten (Autumn) over 3200 metres at Tokyo on 17 November. He was retired after the autumn race.

== Statistics ==
The following table details all 21 starts of Kumohata's racing career. Times and margins were not officially recorded for all races in this era; unrecorded entries are shown as –.

Date	Distance (Condition)	Race	Class	Course	Odds (Favourite)	Field	Finish	Time	Jockey	Winning (Losing) Margin	Winner (2nd Place)	Ref
1939 – three-year-old season
May 20	Turf 2300 m (Good)	Newcomer	Maiden	Tokyo	– (1st)	7	2nd	–	Shōtarō Abe	2.0	Shijiridake	
May 26	Turf 1800 m (Heavy)	Newcomer	Maiden	Tokyo	– (3rd)	7	1st	1:59.3	Shōtarō Abe	–0.4	(Heinera)	
May 28	Turf 2400 m (Heavy)	Tōkyō Yūshun	Classic	Tokyo	– (8th)	20	1st	2:36.1	Shōtarō Abe	–0.5	(Richmond)	
Oct 7	Turf 2200 m (Good)	Open Handicap	Open	Yokohama	– (2nd)	8	7th	–	Shōtarō Abe	–	Sugenuma	
Oct 8	Turf 2000 m (Yielding)	4-Y-O Handicap	Open	Yokohama	– (4th)	4	3rd	–	Shōtarō Abe	–	Rocky More	
Oct 17	Turf 2800 m (Soft)	Yokohama Nōrinshō Shōten	Stakes	Yokohama	– (2nd)	5	3rd	–	Shōtarō Abe	–	Sugenuma	
Nov 3	Turf 2300 m (Good)	Open Handicap	Open	Tokyo	– (2nd)	8	1st	2:27.0	Shōtarō Abe	–0.7	(Kumokiku)	
Nov 19	Turf 2600 m (Good)	Open Winners	Open	Tokyo	– (1st)	8	1st	2:48.3	Shōtarō Abe	–0.5	(Tate)	
Nov 24	Turf 2600 m (Soft)	Open	Open	Nakayama	– (1st)	10	2nd	–	Shōtarō Abe	0.1	Rocky More	
Nov 27	Turf 2400 m (Good)	Open	Open	Nakayama	– (1st)	7	1st	2:35.1	Shōtarō Abe	–0.1	(Tate)	
Dec 10	Turf 2600 m (Good)	Open Winners	Open	Nakayama	– (1st)	8	4th	–	Shōtarō Abe	–	Happy Might	
1940 – four-year-old season
May 10	Turf 2200 m (Good)	Open Handicap	Open	Hanshin	– (1st)	4	1st	2:24.1	Shōtarō Abe	–0.4	(Goford)	
May 19	Turf 3200 m (Good)	Teishitsu Goshoten (Spring)	Imperial Prize	Hanshin	– (3rd)	7	3rd	–	Shōtarō Abe	–	Toki no Chikara	
May 27	Turf 2600 m (Good)	Tokyo Five-Year-Old Special	Stakes	Tokyo	– (1st)	8	1st	2:49.2	Shōtarō Abe	–1.5	(Tamasakura)	
Jun 9	Turf 2600 m (Yielding)	Open Winners	Open	Tokyo	– (1st)	5	1st	2:50.1	Shōtarō Abe	–0.2	(Waldmine)	
Oct 12	Turf 2200 m (Good)	Open Handicap	Open	Yokohama	– (2nd)	7	5th	–	Shōtarō Abe	–	Rocky More	
Oct 14	Turf 2800 m (Good)	Open	Open	Yokohama	– (2nd)	6	1st	3:08.1	Shōtarō Abe	–0.7	(Kumokiku)	
Oct 20	Turf 2800 m (Good)	Yokohama Nōrinshō Shōten	Stakes	Yokohama	– (3rd)	4	2nd	–	Shōtarō Abe	0.7	Rocky Mor	
Nov 7	Turf 2300 m (Yielding)	Open Handicap	Open	Tokyo	– (1st)	6	5th	–	Shōtarō Abe	–	Rocky More	
Nov 9	Turf 2600 m (Good)	Tokyo Five-Year-Old Special	Stakes	Tokyo	– (1st)	5	2nd	–	Shōtarō Abe	1.5	Marutake	
Nov 17	Turf 3200 m (Good)	Teishitsu Goshoten (Autumn)	Imperial Prize	Tokyo	– (2nd)	7	2nd	–	Shōtarō Abe	0.2	Rocky Mor	

== Stud career ==
Kumohata stood as a government stallion at the Hidaka Stud Farm in Hokkaido. He was the Leading Sire in Japan for six consecutive years from 1952 to 1957, the first domestically-bred stallion to top the sire list. He sired seven Tennō Shō winners. He was also the Leading Broodmare Sire in Japan in 1964.

Kumohata contracted equine infectious anemia during an outbreak in the Hidaka region in the summer of 1953. He was euthanised on 10 September 1953 under the Livestock Infectious Disease Control Law. He was buried beneath the merit-horse memorial at Hidaka Stud Farm.

The Kumohata Kinen (クモハタ記念) was established at Nakayama Racecourse in 1951 in his honour and was run until 1980.

=== Notable progeny ===
Progeny	Major wins
Newford (ニユーフオード)	Kikuka Shō, Tennō Shō (Autumn)
Meiji Hikari (メイヂヒカリ)	Kikuka Shō, Tennō Shō (Spring), Nakayama Grand Prix, Asahi Hai Futurity Stakes; Japan Racing Association Hall of Fame (1990)
Katsufuji (カツフジ)	Tennō Shō (Autumn)
Yashima Daughter (ヤシマドオター)	Oka Shō, Tennō Shō (Autumn)
Hatakaze (ハタカゼ)	Tennō Shō (Autumn)
Kiyofuji (キヨフジ)	Yūshun Himba
Mitsu Hata (ミツハタ)	Tennō Shō (Spring)
Quin Narbee (クインナルビー)	Tennō Shō (Autumn)
Wakakusa (ワカクサ)	Hanshin 3-Y-O Stakes, Kobe Cup
Takahata (タカハタ)	Asahi Hai Futurity Stakes, Diamond Stakes, Meguro Kinen (Spring), Nihon Keizai Shō
Kiyo Strong (キヨストロング)	Nakayama Kinen, Kabutoyama Kinen, Kyoto Kinen (Spring), Nippon TV Hai
Koran (コウラン)	Hanshin Daishoten
Hiyaki Ogan (ヒヤキオーガン)	Hanshin Daishoten, Nikkei Shinshun Hai, Chukyo Kinen
Meiji Homare (メイジホマレ)	Chukyo Kinen
Takahagi (タカハギ)	St. Lite Kinen
Masahata (マサハタ)	Kumohata Kinen
Tokino O (トキノオー)	Hanshin Tokubetsu
Fukuryu (フクリユウ)	Nihon Keizai Shō
Toshiwaka (トシワカ)	Diamond Stakes
Hata Ryu (ハタリユウ)	Kyoto 4-Y-O Tokubetsu
Yodo Sakura (ヨドサクラ)	Kyoto Cup
Yamakabuto (ヤマカブト)	Nakayama Daishogai (Autumn), Tokyo Shōgai Tokubetsu (Autumn)
Kenii More (ケニイモア)	Nakayama Daishogai (×2)
Kunihaya (クニハヤ)	Nakayama Daishogai (Spring)
Yoshiminori (ヨシミノリ)	Kyoto Daishōgai (Autumn, Spring)
Kanehata (カネハタ)	Kyoto Daishōgai (Spring)

== Pedigree ==
Pedigree of Kumohata (JPN)
Sire Tournesol (GB) 1922	Gainsborough (GB); 1915	Bayardo	Bay Ronald
Sire Tournesol (GB) 1922	Gainsborough (GB); 1915	Bayardo	Galicia
Sire Tournesol (GB) 1922	Gainsborough (GB); 1915	Rosedrop	St. Frusquin
Sire Tournesol (GB) 1922	Gainsborough (GB); 1915	Rosedrop	Rosaline
Sire Tournesol (GB) 1922	Soliste (FR); 1910	Prince William	Bill of Portland
Sire Tournesol (GB) 1922	Soliste (FR); 1910	Prince William	La Vierge
Sire Tournesol (GB) 1922	Soliste (FR); 1910	Sees	Chesterfield
Sire Tournesol (GB) 1922	Soliste (FR); 1910	Sees	La Goulue
Dam Fairy Maiden (USA) 1924	Gnome (USA); 1916	Whisk Broom	Broomstick
Dam Fairy Maiden (USA) 1924	Gnome (USA); 1916	Whisk Broom	Audience
Dam Fairy Maiden (USA) 1924	Gnome (USA); 1916	Fairy Sprite	Voter
Dam Fairy Maiden (USA) 1924	Gnome (USA); 1916	Fairy Sprite	Cinderella
Dam Fairy Maiden (USA) 1924	Tuscan Maiden (GB); 1918	Maiden Erlegh	Polymelus
Dam Fairy Maiden (USA) 1924	Tuscan Maiden (GB); 1918	Maiden Erlegh	Plum Tart
Dam Fairy Maiden (USA) 1924	Tuscan Maiden (GB); 1918	Tuscan Red	William Rufus
Dam Fairy Maiden (USA) 1924	Tuscan Maiden (GB); 1918	Tuscan Red	Fine Feathers

- Kumohata is inbred 5 × 5 to Hampton (sire side) and 5 × 5 to St. Simon (sire side).
- His sire Tournesol was imported from Britain and was one of the dominant stallions in Japan in the 1930s.
- His dam Fairy Maiden was imported from the United States. His half-sister Cleopatra Thomas won the Teishitsu Goshoten.

== See also ==
- Thoroughbred racing in Japan
- Tōkyō Yūshun
- Leading sire in Japan
