= Sugenuma =

Japanese Thoroughbred racehorse (1935–1945)

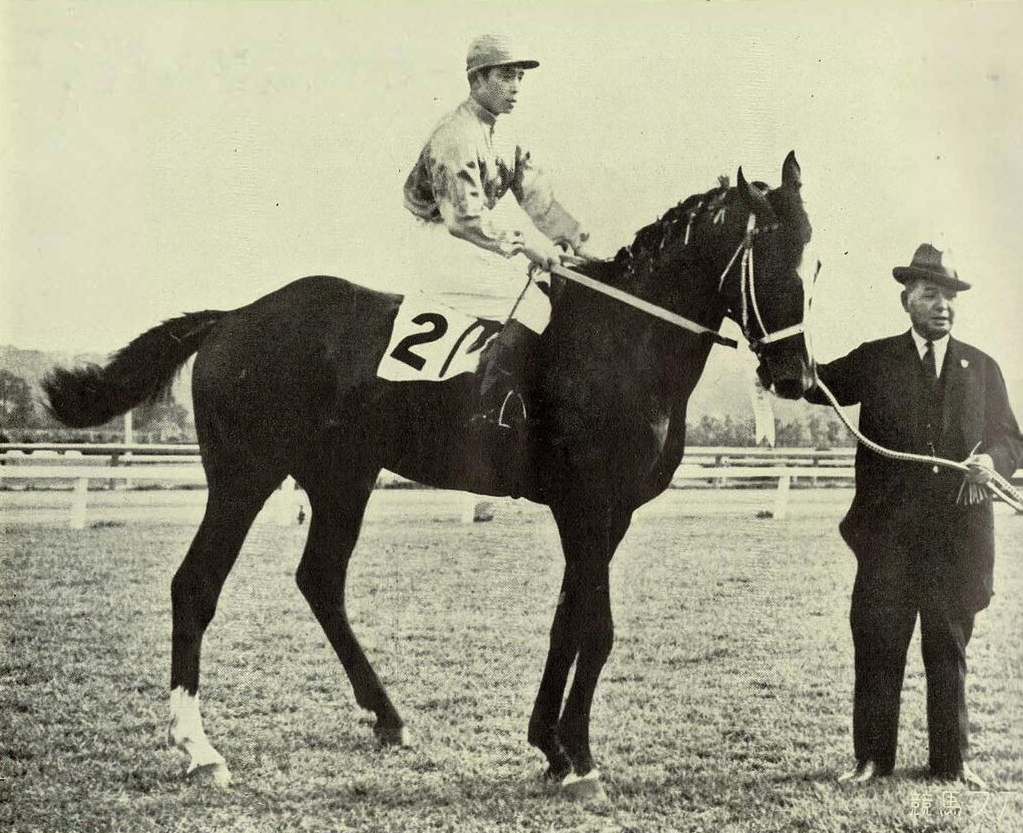
- Sugenuma winning the 7th Tokyo Yushun (1938)
- Breed: Thoroughbred-type
- Sire: Priory Park
- Grandsire: Rocksavage
- Dam: Kokuhō
- Damsire: Gallon
- Sex: Stallion
- Foaled: 7 April 1935
- Died: after 1945
- Country: Japan
- Colour: Dark bay
- Breeder: Chigira Farm
- Owner: Kenji Chigira
- Trainer: Hiroshi Nakamura; Jūzō Osanaie
- Jockey: Hiroshi Nakamura; Shōshirō Itō
- Record: 23: 12-4-3
- Earnings: ¥85,154

Major wins
- Tōkyō Yūshun (1938); Teishitsu Goshoten (Spring) (1939); Yokohama Special (Spring) (1939); Yokohama Nōrinshō Shōten (1939)

Sugenuma (Japanese: スゲヌマ, Sugenuma; 7 April 1935 – after August 1945) was a Japanese Thoroughbred-type racehorse. He competed from 1938 to 1939, recording twelve wins from twenty-three starts, including the Tōkyō Yūshun (Japanese Derby) in 1938 and the Teishitsu Goshoten (Spring) in 1939. He was disqualified from the Meguro Kinen (Autumn) in November 1939 after a stimulant was detected in a post-race drug test, and was retired to stud. He was decommissioned in August 1945 and his subsequent fate is unknown.

== Background ==
Sugenuma was a dark bay colt bred at Chigira Farm in Katashina Village, Gunma Prefecture. He was sired by Priory Park, a British-bred stallion imported to Japan in 1929, and his dam was Kokuhō (国宝), a mare who won the Teishitsu Goshoten under the racing names Carnation (カーネーション) and Kokuhō. His damsire was Gallon, a British import. Kokuhō's dam, Hōei (宝永), was an Australian-bred mare of uncertain pedigree imported in 1913; because no formal pedigree registration system existed at the time, Sugenuma was classified as a "Thoroughbred-type" (サラブレッド系種) rather than a full Thoroughbred.

He was owned by Kenji Chigira and trained by Hiroshi Nakamura at Tokyo Racecourse.

== Racing career ==
=== 1938: three-year-old season ===
Sugenuma debuted on 2 April 1938 in a newcomer race at Nakayama Racecourse, finishing third. He finished third again in his second start two days later. He then won three consecutive races at Nakayama, Yokohama, and Tokyo.

On 29 May, he won the 7th Tōkyō Yūshun (Japanese Derby) at Tokyo Racecourse over 2400 metres on good ground, defeating the favourite Taeyama by a neck in a race-record time of 2:33.2. This was the first running of the race under the name "Tokyo Yushun Kyōsō," having been renamed from "Tokyo Yushun Daikyōsō" (東京優駿大競走) that year.

He finished unplaced in five consecutive races after the Derby, including second in the Yokohama Nōrinshō Shōten at Yokohama in October.

=== 1939: four-year-old season ===
Sugenuma finished second in a handicap at Nakayama on 1 April. He then won six consecutive races, including the Yokohama Special (Spring) over 3450 metres, the Teishitsu Goshoten (Spring) at Naruo Racecourse over 3200 metres on dirt, and the Tokyo Five-Year-Old Special. On 17 October, he won the Yokohama Nōrinshō Shōten over 2800 metres, defeating Tetsumon and Kumohata.

He finished fourth in a handicap at Tokyo on 3 November. On 12 November, he contested the Meguro Kinen (Autumn) over 3400 metres at Tokyo. He finished first but was disqualified after a stimulant was detected in a post-race drug test. The victory was awarded to Hōnen.

== Stud career ==
Sugenuma was retired to stud in 1939 under the name Carnesie Bee (カーネーシービー) at Chigira Farm in Gunma Prefecture. In 1943, he was transferred to the Hidaka Livestock Breeding Farm in Hokkaido and re-registered under his original name. He was decommissioned in August 1945. His stud career produced no notable offspring.

== Legacy ==
Kenji Chigira's son Yasushi Chigira won the 1963 Tōkyō Yūshun with Meizui, and his grandson Daisaku Chigira won the 1983 Tōkyō Yūshun with Mr. C.B. This is the only instance of three generations of the same family winning the Japanese Derby as owners.

Some sources list Sugenuma's owner as Kenji's father, Morizō Chigira, who died on 29 May 1938 at the age of 92.

Trainer-jockey Hiroshi Nakamura stated: "That horse was large in frame but moody. He worked well in training, but in races he was at the mercy of the wind on the day."

== Statistics ==
The following table details all 23 starts of Sugenuma's racing career. Times and margins were not officially recorded for all races in this era; unrecorded entries are shown as –.

Date	Distance (Condition)	Race	Class	Course	Odds (Favourite)	Field	Finish	Time	Jockey	Winning (Losing) Margin	Winner (2nd Place)	Ref
1938 – three-year-old season
Apr 2	Turf 2000 m (Good)	Newcomer	Maiden	Nakayama	– (1st)	5	3rd	–	Hiroshi Nakamura	–	Dashing	
Apr 4	Turf 2000 m (Yielding)	Newcomer	Maiden	Nakayama	– (2nd)	3	3rd	–	Hiroshi Nakamura	–	Taeyama	
Apr 10	Turf 2000 m (Good)	Newcomer	Maiden	Nakayama	– (1st)	4	1st	2:10.0	Hiroshi Nakamura	–2.5	(Waldo)	
Apr 30	Turf 2000 m (Good)	Allowance	Allowance	Yokohama	– (1st)	11	1st	2:10.0	Hiroshi Nakamura	–0.4	(Nasuno Ford)	
May 22	Turf 2000 m (Good)	Allowance	Allowance	Tokyo	– (1st)	12	1st	2:09.3	Hiroshi Nakamura	–1.0	(Optimist)	
May 29	Turf 2400 m (Good)	Tōkyō Yūshun	Classic	Tokyo	– (2nd)	14	1st	R2:33.2	Hiroshi Nakamura	–0.2	(Taeyama)	
Oct 8	Turf 2200 m (Good)	Open Handicap	Open	Yokohama	– (1st)	12	11th	–	Hiroshi Nakamura	–	Taeyama	
Oct 10	Turf 2000 m (Good)	Open	Open	Yokohama	– (1st)	4	3rd	–	Hiroshi Nakamura	–	Fine More	
Oct 17	Turf 2800 m (Soft)	Yokohama Nōrinshō Shōten	Stakes	Yokohama	– (4th)	7	2nd	–	Hiroshi Nakamura	0.2	Hisatomo	
Nov 3	Turf 2300 m (Yielding)	Open	Open	Tokyo	– (1st)	8	2nd	–	Hiroshi Nakamura	0.4	Tōyō	
Nov 19	Turf 2200 m (Good)	Open Handicap	Open	Nakayama	– (1st)	7	5th	–	Hiroshi Nakamura	–	Fair More	
1939 – four-year-old season
Apr 1	Turf 2200 m (Good)	Open Handicap	Open	Nakayama	– (1st)	9	2nd	–	Shōshirō Itō	0.1	Taeyama	
Apr 3	Turf 2400 m (Soft)	Open	Open	Nakayama	– (1st)	2	1st	2:49.2	Shōshirō Itō	–5.0	(Nanrei)	
Apr 16	Turf 2600 m (Good)	Open Winners	Open	Nakayama	– (1st)	3	1st	2:48.2	Shōshirō Itō	–5.0	(Taeyama)	
Apr 22	Turf 2200 m (Heavy)	Open Handicap	Open	Yokohama	– (1st)	5	1st	2:30.0	Shōshirō Itō	–5.0	(Tatsukabuto)	
Apr 30	Turf 3450 m (Good)	Yokohama Special (Spring)	Stakes	Yokohama	– (1st)	2	1st	3:46.1	Shōshirō Itō	–4.0	(Hen'un)	
May 14	Dirt 3200 m (Yielding)	Teishitsu Goshoten (Spring)	Imperial Prize	Naruo	– (1st)	5	1st	3:31.0	Shōshirō Itō	–3.0	(Taeyama)	
May 26	Turf 2600 m (Soft)	Tokyo Five-Year-Old Special	Stakes	Tokyo	– (1st)	5	1st	2:52.4	Shōshirō Itō	–5.0	(Hamatomi)	
Jun 4	Turf 2600 m (Good)	Open Winners	Open	Tokyo	– (1st)	7	2nd	–	Shōshirō Itō	1.0	Optimist	
Oct 7	Turf 2200 m (Good)	Open Handicap	Open	Yokohama	– (1st)	8	1st	2:24.3	Shōshirō Itō	–0.2	(Henun)	
Oct 17	Turf 2800 m (Heavy)	Yokohama Nōrinshō Shōten	Stakes	Yokohama	– (1st)	5	1st	3:17.0	Shōshirō Itō	–5.0	(Tetsumon)	
Nov 3	Turf 2300 m (Good)	Open Handicap	Open	Tokyo	– (1st)	8	4th	–	Shōshirō Itō	–	Kumohata	
Nov 12	Turf 3400 m (Yielding)	Meguro Kinen (Autumn)	Stakes	Tokyo	– (2nd)	8	DSQ	–	Shōshirō Itō	–	Hen'un	

== Pedigree ==
Pedigree of Sugenuma (JPN)
Sire Priory Park (GB) 1922	Rocksavage (GB); 1915	Rock Sand	Sainfoin
Sire Priory Park (GB) 1922	Rocksavage (GB); 1915	Rock Sand	Roquebrune
Sire Priory Park (GB) 1922	Rocksavage (GB); 1915	Manuka	Eager
Sire Priory Park (GB) 1922	Rocksavage (GB); 1915	Manuka	Sempronia
Sire Priory Park (GB) 1922	Chatham (GB); 1908	Darley Dale	St. Simon
Sire Priory Park (GB) 1922	Chatham (GB); 1908	Darley Dale	Ismay
Sire Priory Park (GB) 1922	Chatham (GB); 1908	Coronation Day	Ermak
Sire Priory Park (GB) 1922	Chatham (GB); 1908	Coronation Day	Farceuse
Dam Kokuhō (JPN) 1922	Gallon (GB); 1909	Gallinule	Isonomy
Dam Kokuhō (JPN) 1922	Gallon (GB); 1909	Gallinule	Moorhen
Dam Kokuhō (JPN) 1922	Gallon (GB); 1909	Flair	St. Frusquin
Dam Kokuhō (JPN) 1922	Gallon (GB); 1909	Flair	Glare
Dam Kokuhō (JPN) 1922	Hōei (AUS) c. 1909	Loombah (uncertain)	Grafton
Dam Kokuhō (JPN) 1922	Hōei (AUS) c. 1909	Loombah (uncertain)	Bragibagee
Dam Kokuhō (JPN) 1922	Hōei (AUS) c. 1909	Appearance (uncertain)	Fucile
Dam Kokuhō (JPN) 1922	Hōei (AUS) c. 1909	Appearance (uncertain)	Handsome

- Sugenuma is inbred 4 × 5 to St. Simon and 5 × 4 to Isonomy.
- His sire Priory Park was imported from Britain in 1929.
- His dam Kokuhō won the Teishitsu Goshoten under the racing names Carnation and Kokuhō.
- His dam's dam Hōei was imported from Australia in 1913. Her pedigree was never officially registered, and Sugenuma was classified as a "Thoroughbred-type" (サラブレッド系種).

== See also ==
- Thoroughbred racing in Japan
- Tōkyō Yūshun
- Mr. C.B.
