= Straitlace =

British-bred Thoroughbred racehorse

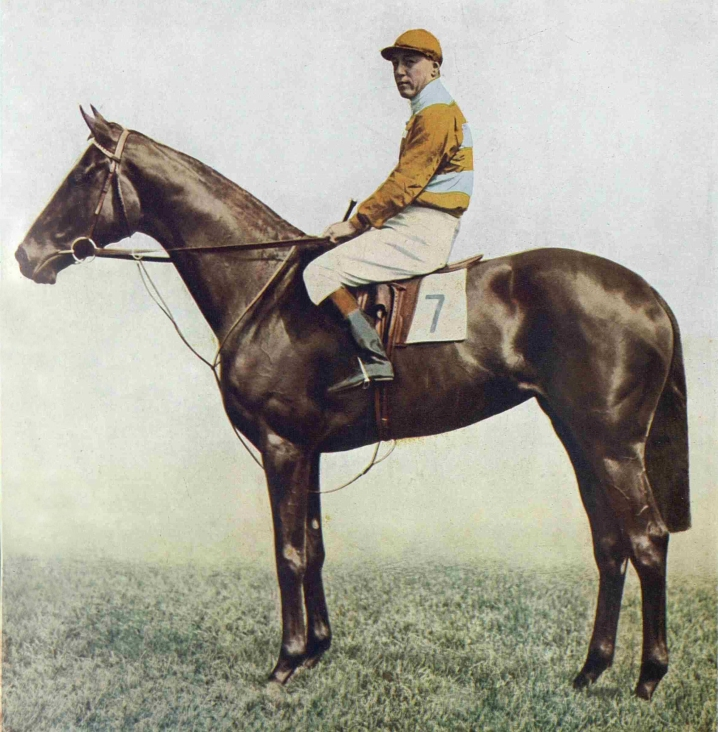
- Straitlace in 1924 with jockey Frank O'Neill.
- Sire: Son-in-Law
- Grandsire: Dark Ronald
- Dam: Stolen Kiss
- Damsire: Best Man
- Sex: Mare
- Foaled: 1921
- Country: United Kingdom
- Colour: Bay
- Breeder: Lady Sykes
- Owner: Edward Hulton
- Trainer: Dawson Waugh
- Record: 16: 8-2-2
- Earnings: £24,130

Major wins
- Epsom Oaks (1924); Coronation Stakes (1924); Nassau Stakes (1924)

Straitlace (1921 – after 1945) was a British Thoroughbred racehorse and broodmare. As a two-year-old she was one of the best fillies of her generation in England when she won five of her eight races. In the following year she finished third in the 1000 Guineas before going on to win the Epsom Oaks, Coronation Stakes and Nassau Stakes, as well as three other races. She earned more money than any other horse in Britain in 1924 and was retired after winning eight of her sister races. Straitlace was exported to France in 1925 and became a very successful and influential broodmare.

== Background ==
Straitlace was a small, but "beautifully proportioned" bay mare with a white star bred at the Sledmere Stud in East Yorkshire by Lady Sykes. As a yearling she was offered for sale and bought for 2,100 guineas by the newspaper proprietor Edward Hulton. The filly was sent into training with Dawson Waugh (trainer of Tagalie) at his Somerville Lodge stable at Newmarket, Suffolk.

She was sired by Son-in-Law, a top-class stayer, whose wins included the Goodwood Cup, Jockey Club Cup and Cesarewitch. Straitlace's dam Stolen Kiss was a very successful sprinter who won nineteen races including the Portland Handicap in 1911. Her other foals included Kiss Again, a mare whose female-line descendants have included Henbit, Dancing Brave, Jolypha, Delta Blues and Lucky Debonair.

== Racing career ==
=== 1923: two-year-old season ===
Straitlace ran consistently against good competition as a two-year-old in 1923, recording five wins, two seconds and one third place from eight starts. After finishing second to Mumtaz Mahal (also bred at Sledmere) at Newmarket Racecourse in May she won the Stud Produce Stakes at Sandown Park, the Great Surrey Foal Plate at Epsom Racecourse, the Exeter Stakes at Newmarket, a Rous Memorial Stakes at Goodwood and the Autumn Breeders' Foal Plate at Manchester.

At Newmarket in October she finished second to Chronometer in the Cheveley Park Stakes. On her only other appearance she finished third to Eatonwick and Heverswool in a Rous Memorial Stakes at Newmarket. By the end of the year she had earned at least £6,175 in prize money.

=== 1924: three-year-old season ===
On 9 May 1924, Straitlace was one of sixteen fillies to contest the Rowley Mile course at Newmarket Racecourse and finished third behind Plack and Mumtaz Mahal, beaten two lengths by the winner.

At Epsom on 6 of June, Straitlace faced a rematch with Plack in the 146th running of the Oaks Stakes. Thecontest was run in fine weather but attracted a smaller than usual crown, with many racegoers reportedly being discouraged by the appalling conditions which had prevailed for the Epsom Derby two days earlier. Ridden by Frank O'Neill, she started at odds of 100/30 second favourite in a twelve-runner field. Straitlace tracked Plack in the early stages before overtaking her rival approaching the straight and then opening up a clear advantage. She won by one and a half lengths from Plack with the fast-finishing Mink a head away in third place.

At Royal Ascot in June Straitlace was brought back in distance for the Coronation Stakes over one mile in which he was ridden by Charlie Elliott and won at odds of 3/1, "in the style of a really good filly". At Goodwood, with Elliott again in the saddle she started 4/9 favourite and won the Nassau Stakes over ten furlongs. The runner-up on this occasion was the Aga Khan's four-year-old Charley's Mount, who went on to win the Cesarewitch later that year. She won three other races in 1924 and was retired at the end of the season having earned £17,965, making her the most financially successful horse in Britain that year.

== Assessment and honours ==
In their book, A Century of Champions, based on the Timeform rating system, John Randall and Tony Morris rated Straitlace an "average" winner of the Oaks.

== Breeding record ==
Straitlace was retired from racing to become a broodmare. After Edward Hulton's death in 1925 the mare was sold for 17,000 guineas by Edward Esmond. She was exported to France, where she spent the rest of her life. Her foals included:

- Necklace, a bay filly, foaled in 1926, sired by Lemberg. Won Prix Morny. Great grand-dam of Pidget.
- Lovelace, brown colt, 1927, by La Farina. Won 10 races including Prix d'Ispahan, Prix de la Forêt.
- Staylace, bay filly, 1928, by Teddy. Winner. Dam of Foxglove (Ebor Handicap).
- Fireplace, chestnut filly, 1929, by Bruleur. Female-line ancestor of Sailor's Guide, Stravinsky and Halfway to Heaven.
- Interlace, bay colt, 1930, by Hurry On. Winner. Third in the Jockey Club Stakes.
- Solace, bay filly, 1934, by Solario. Great grand-dam of Gossiper (AJC Oaks).
- Silverlace, bay filly, 1937, by Hotweed
- Streamlace, bay filly, 1943, by Vatellor

== Pedigree ==
Pedigree of Straitlace (GB), bay mare, 1921
| Sire Son-in-Law (GB) 1911 | Dark Ronald (IRE); 1905 | Bay Ronald (GB) | Hampton |
| Sire Son-in-Law (GB) 1911 | Dark Ronald (IRE); 1905 | Bay Ronald (GB) | Black Duchess |
| Sire Son-in-Law (GB) 1911 | Dark Ronald (IRE); 1905 | Darkie (GB) | Thurio |
| Sire Son-in-Law (GB) 1911 | Dark Ronald (IRE); 1905 | Darkie (GB) | Insignia |
| Sire Son-in-Law (GB) 1911 | Mother In Law (GB); 1906 | Matchmaker | Donovan |
| Sire Son-in-Law (GB) 1911 | Mother In Law (GB); 1906 | Matchmaker | Match Girl |
| Sire Son-in-Law (GB) 1911 | Mother In Law (GB); 1906 | Be Cannie | Jock of Oran |
| Sire Son-in-Law (GB) 1911 | Mother In Law (GB); 1906 | Be Cannie | Reticence |
| Dam Stolen Kiss (GB) 1907 | Best Man (GB); 1890 | Ormonde | Bend Or |
| Dam Stolen Kiss (GB) 1907 | Best Man (GB); 1890 | Ormonde | Lily Agnes |
| Dam Stolen Kiss (GB) 1907 | Best Man (GB); 1890 | Wedlock | Wenlock |
| Dam Stolen Kiss (GB) 1907 | Best Man (GB); 1890 | Wedlock | Cybele |
| Dam Stolen Kiss (GB) 1907 | Breach (GB); 1898 | Hagioscope | Speculum |
| Dam Stolen Kiss (GB) 1907 | Breach (GB); 1898 | Hagioscope | Sophia |
| Dam Stolen Kiss (GB) 1907 | Breach (GB); 1898 | Mitrailleuse | brother to Strafford |
| Dam Stolen Kiss (GB) 1907 | Breach (GB); 1898 | Mitrailleuse | West Australian mare (Family 3-d) |
