= Plack (horse) =

British-bred Thoroughbred racehorse

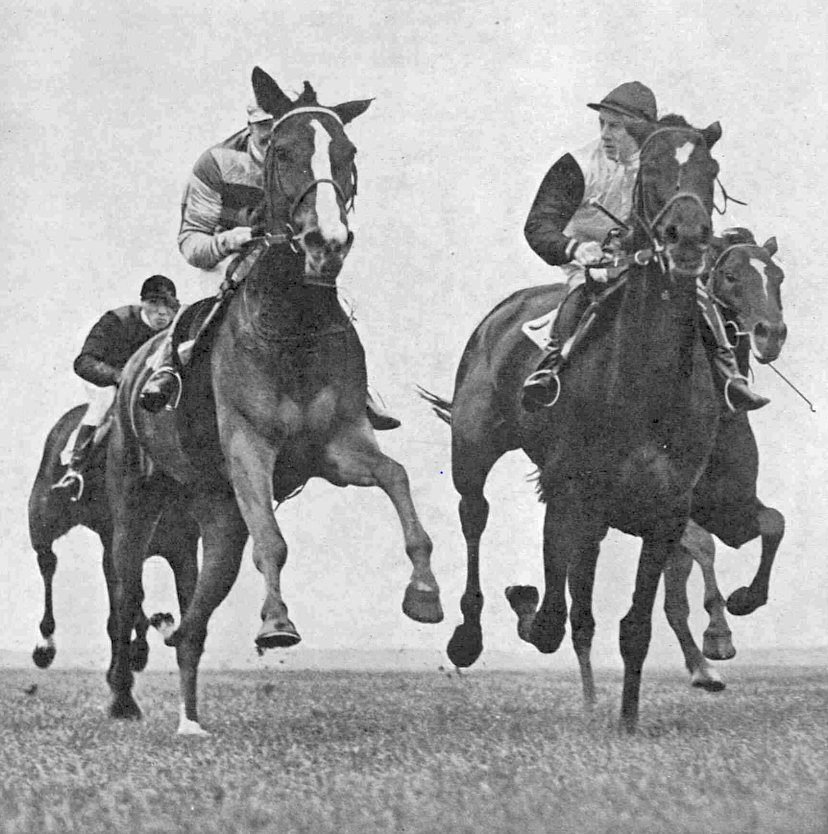
- Plack (left) in 1926 Chippenham Stakes
- Sire: Hurry On
- Grandsire: Marcovil
- Dam: Groat
- Damsire: Junior
- Sex: Mare
- Foaled: 1921
- Country: United Kingdom
- Colour: Chestnut
- Breeder: Archibald Primrose, 5th Earl of Rosebery
- Owner: 5th Earl of Rosebery
- Trainer: Jack Jarvis
- Record: 17: 6-2-6 (incomplete)

Major wins
- 1000 Guineas (1924); Newmarket Oaks (1924); Jockey Club Cup (1924)

Plack (1921–1940) was a British Thoroughbred racehorse and broodmare. As a juvenile in 1923 when she won three races and finished second to Diophon in the Middle Park Stakes. In the following year she recorded her biggest victory when taking a very strong renewal of the 1000 Guineas and then finished second in the Epsom Oaks. Later that year she added wins in the Newmarket Oaks and the Jockey Club Cup. She failed to win in 1925 but was placed in the Coronation Cup, Hardwicke Stakes, Doncaster Cup and Jockey Club Cup. Despite producing few foals she had some influence as a broodmare.

== Background ==
Plack was a chestnut mare bred and owned by Archibald Primrose, 5th Earl of Rosebery. During her racing career he was trained by Jack Jarvis at the Park Lodge at Newmarket, Suffolk. Physically, she was described as being built on a "generous scale with a look of speed in the easy play of her limbs".

She was from the third crop of foals sired by the unbeaten champion, Hurry On, making her a representative of the Godolphin Arabian sire line. Hurry On sired numerous other major winners including Captain Cuttle, Coronach, Call Boy, Pennycomequick, Cresta Run and Precipitation. Plack's dam Groat was a granddaughter of Montem, a broodmare whose other descendants included Sweet Solera, Aunt Edith, Colombo, Ellangowan and Blind Luck.

== Racing career ==
=== 1923: two-year-old season ===
She recorded her first victory in the Lennox Maiden Plate at Hurst Park and followed up by taking the Rous Plate at Doncaster Racecourse in September. Later that month she was sent to Scotland and won the Land o' Burns Nursery Handicap at Ayr, conceding at least fourteen pounds to her opponents.

On 19 October at Newmarket Plack contested the Middle Park Stakes over six furlongs and finished second, beaten one and a half lengths by the Aga Khan III's colt Diophon, after pursuing the winner "gamely to the end". In her two other starts she finished third in the Kingston Plate and unplaced in one race.

=== 1924: three-year-old season ===
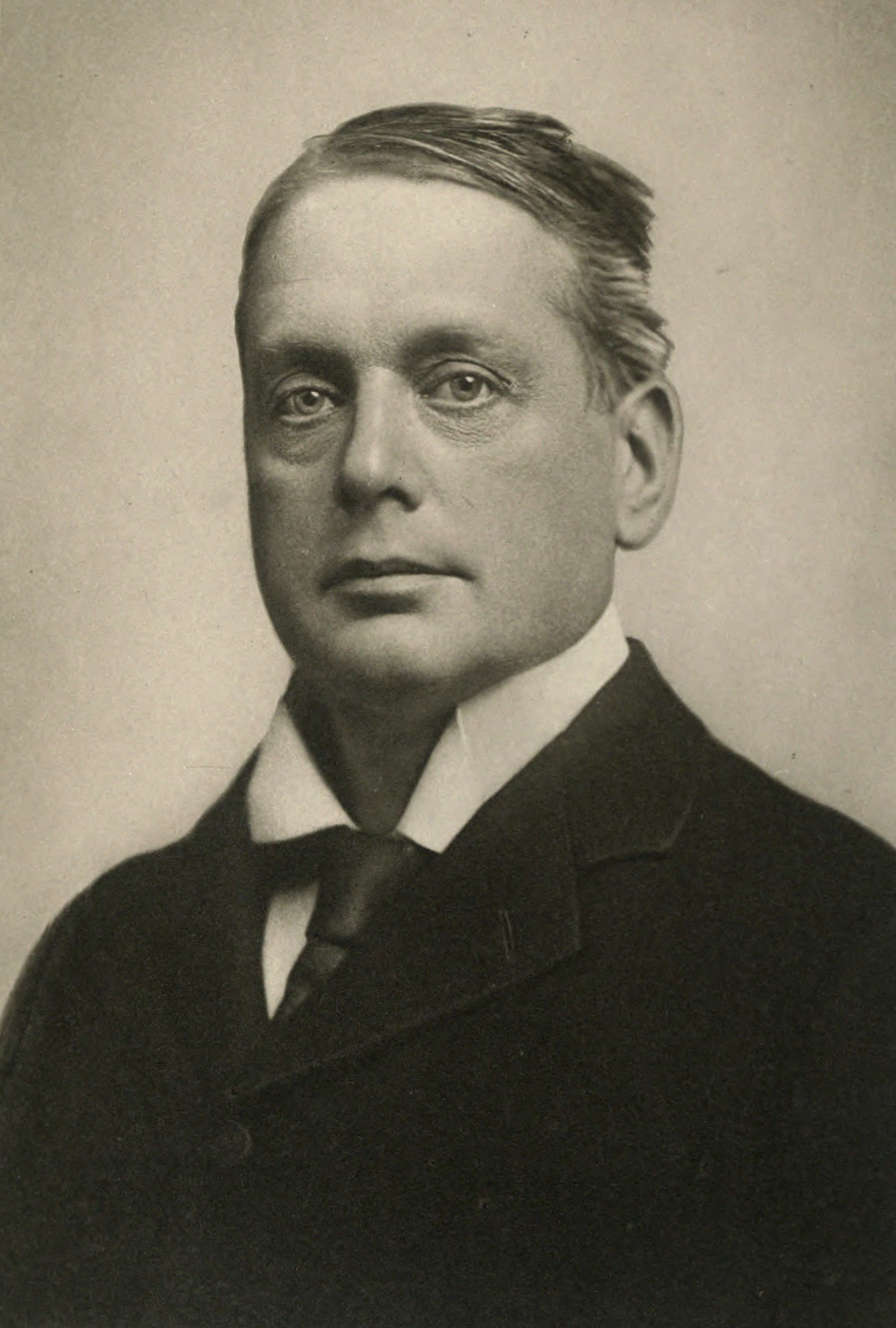
Plack's owner Lord Rosebery

Plack made her second season debut in the Brandon Handicap over nine furlongs at Newmarket in April for which she carried top weight of 132 pounds and finished third behind Brig o' Doon and MacCarthy More.

On 9 May 1924 Plack, ridden by Charlie Elliott, started at odds of 8/1 for the 111th running of the 1000 Guineas over the Rowley Mile course. The favourite Mumtaz Mahal set off in front and opened up a clear lead before tiring in the closing stages. Plack, with her tail "revolving like a windmill" overtook the favourite inside the final furlong and won by one and a half lengths, with half a length back to Straitlace in third place. Lord Rosebery was in poor health and was represented at Newmarket by his son Lord Dalmeny but recovered to celebrate his 77th birthday on 21 May with a number of ceremonies, one of which included a "firework effigy" of Plack.

Plack was moved up in distance and started favourite for the Oaks Stakes over one and a half miles at Epsom Racecourse on 6 June. She took the lead from the start but looked uncomfortable coming down the hill and was overtaken by traitlace entering the straight. She looked completely beaten at that point but rallied well in the last quarter mile and at the finishing line she was only a length and a half behind her rival. The filly was then stepped up in distance and matched against older horses in the Ascot Gold Cup over two and a half miles but after being badly hampered by Papyrus she finished unplaced behind the French four-year-old Massine.

In autumn Plack returned to winning form when she took the Newmarket Oaks over fourteen furlongs. She faced older stayers for the second time on 30 October when she contested the two and a quarter mile Jockey Club Cup at Newmarket. Ridden by Charlie Smirke she started odds-on favourite and won by one and a half lengths from the Prince of Wales's Stakes winner Eastern Monarch.

=== 1925: four-year-old season ===
Plack remained in training as a four-year-old and ran consistently well in top class weight-for-age races without winning. At Epsom on 28 May she finished third of seven behind St Germans and Sansovino in the Coronation Cup at Epsom, and in the Hardwicke Stakes at Royal Ascot in June she again came home third, beaten by Hurstwood and Tournesol. Plack returned to her favoured extended distance in the Goodwood Cup and appeared to be going very easily when she clipped the heels of the horse in front, stumbled badly and unseated Charlie Elliott. In September Plack contested the Doncaster Cup and finished third behind St Germans and Hurstwood. In the following month she was beaten into third behind Bucellas and Foxlaw when attempting to repeat her 1924 success in the Jockey Club Cup.

== Assessment and honours ==
In their book, A Century of Champions, based on the Timeform rating system, John Randall and Tony Morris rated Plack an "average" winner of the 1000 Guineas.

== Breeding record ==
Plack was retired from racing to become a broodmare but proved difficult to get in foal and produced few foals before she died in 1940. Her offspring included:

- Coin of the Realm, a brown filly, foaled in 1930, sired by Phalaris. Winner; second in the Falmouth Stakes; dam of the Derby runner-up and Newmarket Stakes winner Midas.
- Carlino, colt, 1933, Sansovino
- Afterthought, bay filly, 1939, by Obliterate. Won Jockey Clup Cup; second in the Oaks Stakes; granddam of Aunt Edith.

== Pedigree ==
Pedigree of Plack (GB), chestnut mare, 1921
Sire Hurry On (GB) 1913	Marcovil (GB); 1903	Marco	Barcaldine
Sire Hurry On (GB) 1913	Marcovil (GB); 1903	Marco	Novitiate
Sire Hurry On (GB) 1913	Marcovil (GB); 1903	Lady Villikins	Hagioscope
Sire Hurry On (GB) 1913	Marcovil (GB); 1903	Lady Villikins	Dinah
Sire Hurry On (GB) 1913	Toute Suite (GB); 1904	Sainfoin	Springfield
Sire Hurry On (GB) 1913	Toute Suite (GB); 1904	Sainfoin	Sanda
Sire Hurry On (GB) 1913	Toute Suite (GB); 1904	Star	Thurio
Sire Hurry On (GB) 1913	Toute Suite (GB); 1904	Star	Meteor
Dam Groat (GB) 1917	Junior (GB); 1909	Symington	Ayrshire
Dam Groat (GB) 1917	Junior (GB); 1909	Symington	Siphonia
Dam Groat (GB) 1917	Junior (GB); 1909	Scylla	Eager
Dam Groat (GB) 1917	Junior (GB); 1909	Scylla	Sirenia
Dam Groat (GB) 1917	Sixpenny (GB); 1912	William the Third	St Simon
Dam Groat (GB) 1917	Sixpenny (GB); 1912	William the Third	Gravity
Dam Groat (GB) 1917	Sixpenny (GB); 1912	Montem	Ladas
Dam Groat (GB) 1917	Sixpenny (GB); 1912	Montem	Kermesse (Family 11-f)
