= The Panther (horse) =

British-bred Thoroughbred racehorse

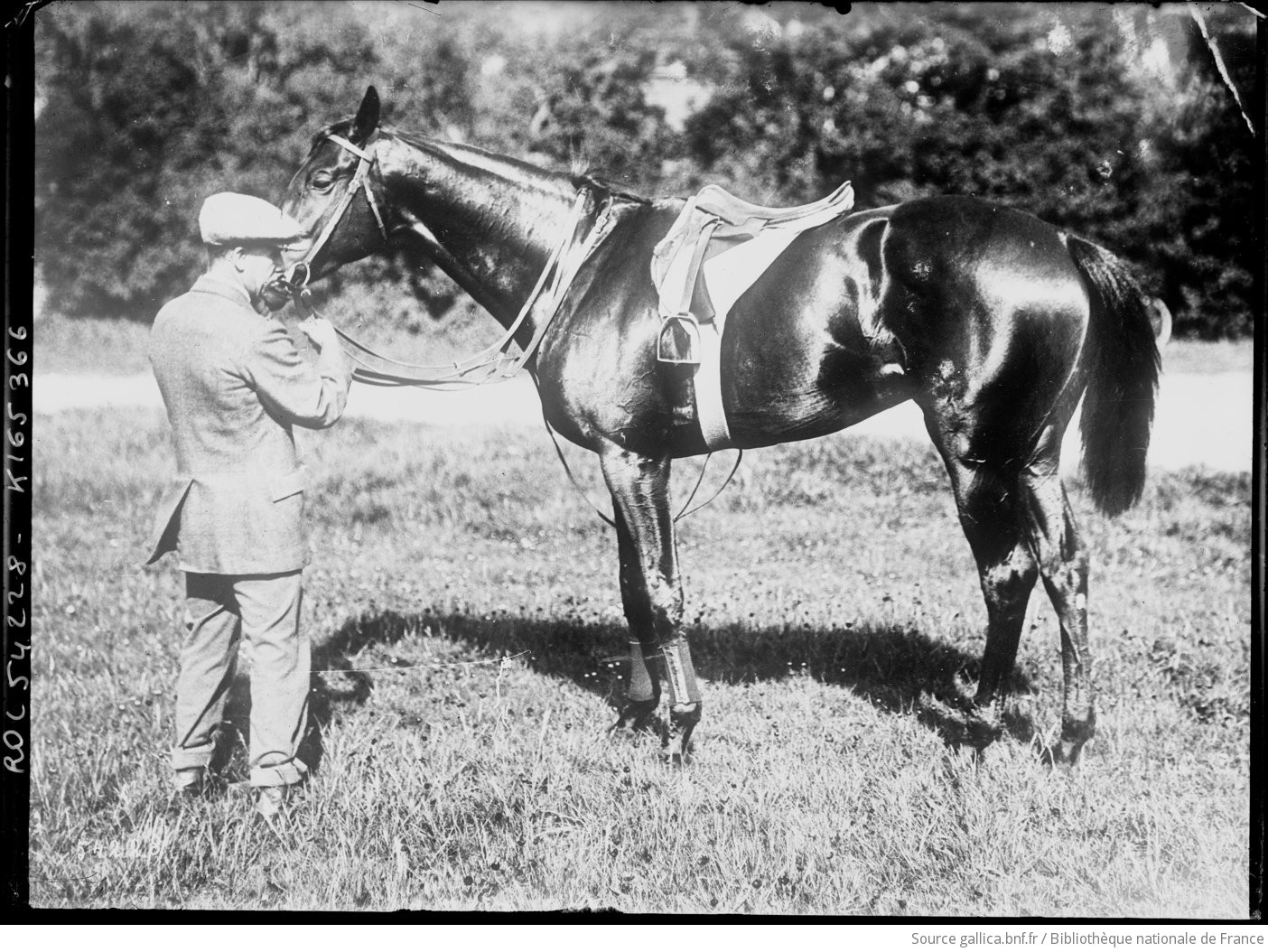
- photographed in 1919
- Sire: Tracery
- Grandsire: Rock Sand
- Dam: Countess Zia
- Damsire: Gallinule
- Sex: Stallion
- Foaled: 8 February 1916
- Country: United Kingdom
- Colour: Brown
- Breeder: National Stud
- Owner: Sir Alec Black
- Trainer: George Manser
- Record: 7:3-1-0
- Earnings: £5,736

Major wins
- 2000 Guineas (1919)

Awards
- Top-rated British Two-year-old (1918)

The Panther (8 February 1916 – October 1931) was a British Thoroughbred racehorse and sire. In a career that lasted from May 1918 to October 1919 he ran seven times and won three races. Although he ran only three times in 1918, he was rated the best British two-year-old of the year on the strength of his win in the Autumn Stakes. The following spring he won the Classic 2000 Guineas at Newmarket. He started favourite for The Derby but finished unplaced after becoming distressed before the race. He failed to recover his form in two subsequent races and was retired to a stud career in Argentina. He was returned to Britain shortly before his death in 1931.

== Background ==
The Panther was a brown horse officially bred by the British National Stud. He was sired by August Belmont Jr.'s American-bred St Leger winner Tracery out of Countess Zia, a mare owned by Lord Wavertree. In 1915, Wavertree donated all his bloodstock, including the pregnant Countess Zia, to the British Government, and The Panther was foaled the following spring at the National Stud. In 1916, the yearling colt was sent to the sales at Newmarket, Suffolk where his striking appearance made him the subject of considerable interest before he was bought by the shipping magnate Sir Alec Black for 3,600 guineas, the highest price paid for a yearling that year. Black sent the colt to his private trainer George Manser at his Warren House stables at Newmarket.

== Racing career ==
=== 1918: two-year-old season ===
The Panther made his first racecourse appearance at Newmarket in May 1918. He showed promise in finishing a close second to Galloper Light, a colt who went on to win the Grand Prix de Paris. At the next Newmarket meeting he recorded his first win when he beat a field of thirty opponents very easily by eight lengths in the Bartlow Plate.

After a break of four months, The Panther returned in the six furlong Autumn Stakes at Newmarket in September. He won impressively from the filly Bayuda, with Galloper Light in third. Bayuda subsequently won the Cheveley Park Stakes, the year's most important race for two-year-old fillies and won The Oaks in 1919.

Following The Panther's win, Black sent the colt to the Newmarket Sales with the huge reserve price of £40,000, announcing via the auctioneer that if the reserve was not met he would leave the ring "and nobody will be able to buy him afterward." There were no bids, with some considering the affair to be rather ridiculous as the reserve was double what anyone would be likely to offer. Despite his lack of experience, The Panther was the top-rated juvenile in the British Free Handicap, being assigned 126 pounds, two pounds ahead of Galloper Light and Grand Parade.

=== 1919: three-year-old season ===
The Panther began the year as the leading fancy for the Classics, despite some queries about the validity of his entries: it was unsuccessfully argued that a horse's entries had to be made by a named individual, rather than an organisation like the National Stud. Confidence in the horse waned however, after it became known that he had been beaten in a "private" trial race at Newmarket. On his first public appearance of the year on 7 May he started at 10/1 for the 2000 Guineas over one mile at Newmarket against eleven opponents. Ridden by Richard "Dick" Cooper, he won by a neck and three quarters of a length from Buchan and Dominion.

The Panther's win in the Guineas created enormous public interest and he was heavily backed for The Derby. Press reports stated that his backers stood to take up to £100,000 in winning bets and considered him to be an "unbeatable proposition". His task appeared to have been made easier when Stefan the Great, who had been considered his most serious rival, failed to recover from injury and was withdrawn from the race. At Epsom he started 6/5 favourite in a field of thirteen for the "Victory Derby" on 4 June. Before the race he became highly agitated and delayed the start by "rampaging about" and refusing to line up with the others. He started badly then rushed up to join the leaders after four furlongs before dropping away quickly and finishing ninth behind Grand Parade. There was some speculation that the colt had been upset by the huge crowd on his first race away from Newmarket, while according to Cooper the colt "never promised to do anything" after the first half mile. A later explanation was that The Panther was distracted by the presence in the pre-race parade of a mounted policeman riding a mare which was described as being "in a condition to upset any stallion" (in season).

The Panther's subsequent career was a complete failure. He finished fifth of the eight runners behind Loch Lomond in the Irish Derby at the Curragh on 25 June. In the Champion Stakes at Newmarket in October he looked impressive before the race and was ridden by the Champion Jockey Steve Donoghue, Cooper having had his license to ride withdrawn by the Jockey Club stewards after allegations of race-fixing. After showing good early speed however, The Panther dropped away quickly and finished unplaced behind Buchan, leading The Sportsman to suggest that he was deficient in either ability or courage. He was then retired from racing.

== Stud career ==
The Panther was sold as a prospective stallion for £15,000 and exported to Argentina. He had some success in South America, siring Capablanca, who won the 1924 Gran Premio Polla de Potrillos (Argentinian 2000 Guineas), while his son Poor Chap was the leading sire in Chile in 1939. He was eventually returned to Britain in 1929 after being bought by a syndicate of breeders, but died in October 1931. A post-mortem examination revealed evidence of serious and chronic heart disease.

== Pedigree ==
Pedigree of The Panther (GB), brown stallion, 1916
Sire Tracery (USA) 1909	Rock Sand; 1900	Sainfoin	Springfield
Sire Tracery (USA) 1909	Rock Sand; 1900	Sainfoin	Sanda
Sire Tracery (USA) 1909	Rock Sand; 1900	Roquebrune	St. Simon*
Sire Tracery (USA) 1909	Rock Sand; 1900	Roquebrune	St. Marguerite
Sire Tracery (USA) 1909	Topiary; 1901	Orme	Ormonde
Sire Tracery (USA) 1909	Topiary; 1901	Orme	Angelica
Sire Tracery (USA) 1909	Topiary; 1901	Plaisanterie	Wellingtonia
Sire Tracery (USA) 1909	Topiary; 1901	Plaisanterie	Poetess
Dam Countess Zia (GB) 1910	Gallinule; 1884	Isonomy	Sterling
Dam Countess Zia (GB) 1910	Gallinule; 1884	Isonomy	Isola Bella
Dam Countess Zia (GB) 1910	Gallinule; 1884	Moorhen	Hermit
Dam Countess Zia (GB) 1910	Gallinule; 1884	Moorhen	sister to Ryshworth
Dam Countess Zia (GB) 1910	Order of Merit; 1904	Collar	St. Simon*
Dam Countess Zia (GB) 1910	Order of Merit; 1904	Collar	Ornament
Dam Countess Zia (GB) 1910	Order of Merit; 1904	Lady Rayleigh	Hampton
Dam Countess Zia (GB) 1910	Order of Merit; 1904	Lady Rayleigh	St. Cypria (Family:8-d)

- The Panther was inbred 4x4 to St. Simon, meaning this stallion appears twice in the fourth generation of his pedigree.
