= Fred Templeman =

British jockey

Personal information
- Born: 10 February 1892
- Died: 17 May 1973 (aged 81)
- Occupation: Jockey

Horse racing career
- Sport: Horse racing

Major racing wins
- Major races Epsom Derby (1919)

Significant horses
- Grand Parade

Frederick George Templeman (10 February 1892 – 17 May 1973) was an Epsom Derby winning English jockey.

He was born in Hertford and rode his first racehorse aged 13. His father William had been a jockey, and his great-uncle Sim Templeman had won both the Derby and the Oaks three times.

He was a surprise winner of the 1919 running of the race on Grand Parade. Owner Lord Glanely entered two horses for the race – Grand Parade and Dominion. Dominion was the favoured of the pair, and trainer Frank Barling's stable jockey Arthur Smith, who had the choice of rides, chose Dominion. This left Templeman to take the ride on the eventual winner.

The same year he won the Royal Hunt Cup on Irish Elegance, carrying a record weight of 9st lllb, and the Liverpool Summer Cup on Arion. He was 7th in the jockeys' championship of 1919 too.

On retirement, he became a trainer and smallholder at Lambourn in Berkshire. During the war he bought a farm of 400 acres at nearby Mildenhall, with the intention of also started a stud farm there once the war was over.

== Major wins ==
(United Kingdom) Great Britain

- Epsom Derby – Grand Parade (1919)

== See also ==
- List of jockeys
- List of significant families in British horse racing
