= Algerine (horse) =

American-bred Thoroughbred racehorse

- Sire: Abd-el-Kader
- Grandsire: Australian
- Dam: Nina
- Damsire: Boston
- Sex: Stallion
- Foaled: 1873
- Country: United States
- Colour: Bay
- Breeder: Thomas W. Doswell
- Owner: Thomas W. Doswell; William L. Scott
- Trainer: Thomas W. Doswell
- Record: 8: 2-2-1
- Earnings: US$ 1,180 (comparable to $39,821 today)

Major wins
- Belmont Stakes (1876)

Honours
- Algerine Stakes

Algerine (1873 — c. 1892) was an American Thoroughbred racehorse that won the 1876 Belmont Stakes and was the maternal grandsire of Rhoda B, the dam of the 1907 Epsom Derby winner Orby.

== Pedigree ==
Algerine was foaled in 1873 at Bullfield Stud, formerly located in Hanover Junction, Virginia. Bullfield Stud was owned by Major Thomas Walker Doswell (1823 — 1890), and it was a premiere Thoroughbred breeding farm in the years preceding the Civil War. Algerine is described as a blood bay with black points and no white markings that stood 15.3 hands tall.

Abd-el-Kader, Algerine's sire, (foaled in 1865) was a son of the imported British stallion Australian out of the Bethune mare, Rescue. Australian also notably sired Spendthrift and Springbok. Adb-el-Kader was a successful long-distance racer, notably winning a four-mile (6.4 km) race at Saratoga in a time of 7:31 3/4. An injury to his hips as a two-year-old resulted in his having poor hip conformation. As a sire, Algerine is his most notable offspring. Abd-el-Kader died at Bullfield Stud on December 4, 1885, at the age of twenty.

Algerine's dam, Nina, (foaled in 1848) was sired by Boston out of the imported British mare Frolicsome Fanny. Nina won 23 races in 27 starts and was more successful in long-distance races between two and four miles (3.2 and 6.4 km) long. Nina raced until she was four years old and produced Planet in her first season as a broodmare at Doswell's Bullfield Stud. She also produced the good runner Exchequer in 1856. Nina was 25 years old when she foaled Algerine, and her last foal was his full-sister Algeria (foaled 1875). Nina died at the age of 31 years on September 19, 1879, and she was the last surviving offspring of Boston.

== Racing career ==
Algerine did not race at the age of two years and he made his racing debut in the 1876 Preakness Stakes, finishing third behind the winner Shirley and Rappahonnock. His next start was the Belmont Stakes, run at Jerome Park Racetrack, and he had not won any races (was still a maiden) before the Belmont. He was unplaced in the 1876 Dixie Stakes and started five times as a four-year-old, placing behind Parole in the 1877 Maturity Stakes and he ran unplaced in the All-Age Sweepstakes.

=== 1876 Belmont Stakes ===
The 1876 field consisted of five horses, including August Belmont's Fiddlesticks. Algerine won the 1 1/2 mile race over dirt in two minutes and 40.5 seconds.

== Breeding career ==
Algerine was sold after his racing career to congressman William Lawrence Scott and stood as stud at the Algeria Stud farm in Erie, Pennsylvania. When Scott died in September 1891, Algerine was still listed as a stallion at the farm. However, he was not listed as one of the lots in the dispersal auction of the Algeria Stud that occurred in October 1892, indicating that he was sold by other means or he most likely died during this period. In S. D. Bruce's report of foals born in 1894, there is no record of any sired by Algerine that year and no mares were covered by him in 1893.

Algerine's most lasting contribution to Thoroughbred genetics is through his daughter Margerine (foaled 1886 out of Sweet Songstress by Doncaster). Margerine notably foaled Rhoda B and Margerique. Rhoda B (foaled 1895) was sired by Hanover and was sent to England. She was bred to Orme and foaled the Epsom and Irish Derby winner Orby in 1904. Orby sired the 1919 Epsom Derby winner Grand Parade (out of Grand Geraldine) in 1916. Margerique (foaled 1893) was sired by imported Order and produced the 1901 Champion two-year-old colt Nasturtium with Watercress. Nasturtium in turn produced the 1907 champion two-year-old filly, Stamina with Endurance by Right.
