= Grand Parade (horse) =

Irish-bred Thoroughbred racehorse

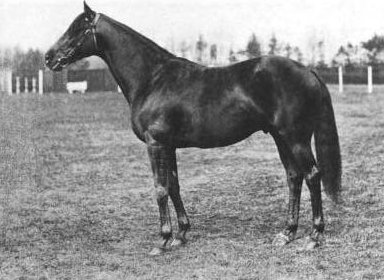
- Grand Parade, circa 1920, as photographed by Clarence Hailey.
- Sire: Orby
- Grandsire: Orme
- Dam: Grand Geraldine
- Damsire: Desmond
- Sex: Stallion
- Foaled: 1916
- Country: United Kingdom of Great Britain and Ireland
- Colour: Black
- Breeder: Richard Croker
- Owner: Lord Glanely
- Trainer: Etienne G. de Mestre; Behan; Frank Barling
- Record: 8: 7-0-1
- Earnings: £

Major wins
- Anglesey Stakes (1918); National Produce Stakes (1918); Epsom Derby (1919); St. James's Palace Stakes (1919)

Grand Parade (1916–1932) was an Irish-bred Thoroughbred racehorse and sire. In a career that lasted from April 1918 to June 1919, he ran eight times, winning seven races and was never beaten at level weights. He was a leading two-year-old in Ireland in 1918, winning the Anglesey Stakes and the National Produce Stakes. In 1919 he won both his races and became the first black horse for 106 years to win The Derby.

== Background ==
Grand Parade (foaled 1916) was bred in Ireland by the American politician Richard Croker at his Glencairn Stud. He was sold as a foal to the shipping magnate Lord Glanely for a sum of 470 gns. The colt was trained during his three-year-old season by Lord Glanely’s private trainer Frank Barling at the Falmouth House stables at Newmarket, Suffolk.

Grand Parade’s sire, Orby, was owned and bred by Croker and had become the first Irish-trained horse to win The Derby in 1907. He went on to be a reasonably successful stallion, siring, apart from Grand Parade, the 1000 Guineas winner and leading sprinter Diadem. The female side of Grand Parade’s pedigree was undistinguished: his dam Grand Geraldine was a former cart-horse that raced only one time as a two-year-old. She produced several full-siblings to Grand Parade (Howard O'Carroll, Oakland and Ybro) that met with limited racing success.

== Racing career ==
=== 1918: two-year-old season ===
Grand Parade won five of his six races as a two-year-old, beginning with the Fitzwilliam Stakes at Newmarket in April. He was then off the course for three months before returning to Newmarket to win the Soltykoff Stakes at the July meeting. He was trained for these races by Etienne G. de Mestre, the son of the notable Australian trainer Etienne L. de Mestre. Grand Parade’s season then took an unusual turn as he was relocated to Ireland where his training was supervised by a trainer named Behan. Grand Parade was unbeaten in three Irish starts, all at the Curragh, winning the Biennial Stakes, the Anglesey Stakes and the National Produce Stakes. In the autumn he was returned to England and joined Frank Barling's stable. Despite a rough sea journey from which he was given no time to recover, Grand Parade was sent straight to Newmarket for the Moulton Stakes. He finished third to Glanmerin and Knight of the Air, attempting to give fifteen pounds to the winner and five to the runner-up, with his jockey, Steve Donoghue, being criticised for giving the colt a poor ride. At the end of the year he was rated the equal second best two-year-old in Britain, two pounds below The Panther.

=== 1919: three-year-old season ===
Grand Parade did not race in public in the spring of 1919. Most attention was focused on his stable companion Dominion, who finished third in the 2000 Guineas, won the Newmarket Stakes and was strongly fancied for the Derby. Grand Parade however, was in good form and earned his place in the Derby field in a private race against a four-year-old called “He”. Grand Parade conceded three pounds to the older horse (a high-class performer who subsequently won the Coronation Cup) and won comfortably. News of his impressive work became public and he became a strong Derby fancy, with odds of 100/12 (just over 8/1) being offered. Shortly before the Derby however, Grand Parade suffered an injury to a heel which interrupted his training and put his participation in doubt, causing his odds to drift out to 33/1. Glanely and Barling’s stable jockey, Arthur Smith, elected to ride Dominion at Epsom, leaving Grand Parade to be partnered by Fred Templeman.

The Derby of the 1919 was the first to be run at Epsom since the First World War. The turf course, having been used by the military for almost four years, was in very poor condition, and was made "treacherous" by rain on the morning of the race. The event attracted a record crowd, including the King who was attending his first race meeting since the end of the war. Grand Parade, making his public debut for the season, started a 33/1 outsider in a field of thirteen, with the 2000 Guineas winner The Panther starting 6/5 favourite. The Panther probably lost his chance at the start, when he became highly agitated, delaying the start by several minutes. Once the race was underway, Templeman had Grand Parade in a prominent position from the start and turned into the straight in second place behind Paper Money Halfway down the straight, Grand Parade overtook Paper Money and stayed on strongly in an "exciting" finish to hold off the challenge of Buchan by half a length, with Paper Money third. The tactics of Buchan's jockey were questionable, as he switched his mount to the inside at a crucial stage, but Grand Parade's win appeared to be decisive. Indeed, according to "Robin Goodfellow" in the Daily Mail, Grand Parade's only problem came when he attempted to jump over a road which crossed the course.

Grand Parade reappeared in mid-June at Royal Ascot when he was brought back in distance to one mile for the St. James's Palace Stakes in which he was matched against Glanmerin, the horse who had beaten him in his only defeat. On what proved to be his final racecourse appearance Grand Parade reversed the form to win by three quarters of a length, although on this occasion it was Glanmerin who appeared to have been given a poor ride.

== Assessment ==
In their book A Century of Champions, John Randall and Tony Morris rated Grand Parade an “inferior” Derby winner.

== Stud career ==
Grand Parade retired to Lord Glanely's Exning Stud, standing at a fee of 400 gns. He sired a large number of winners but only one top-class performer, the 2000 Guineas winner Diophon, who was from his first crop of foals. Grand Parade was also the damsire of the classic winners My Love and Ambiguity. Grand Parade died at Newmarket in May 1932.

== LNER steam locomotive ==
A Class A3 steam locomotive, no. 2744 was named after the horse (most Class A1/A3 locomotives were similarly named for racehorses of the era). The locomotive was destroyed in a serious accident at Castlecary in 1937 which killed 35 people, although the driver and fireman survived with only minor injuries. A replacement Grand Parade of the same class was built.

== Pedigree ==
Pedigree of Grand Parade (IRE), black stallion, 1916
| Sire Orby (GB) ch. 1904 | Orme b. 1889 | Ormonde b. 1883 | Bend Or |
| Sire Orby (GB) ch. 1904 | Orme b. 1889 | Ormonde b. 1883 | Lily Agnes |
| Sire Orby (GB) ch. 1904 | Orme b. 1889 | Angelica b. 1879 | Galopin* |
| Sire Orby (GB) ch. 1904 | Orme b. 1889 | Angelica b. 1879 | St. Angela |
| Sire Orby (GB) ch. 1904 | Rhoda B. br. 1895 | Hanover ch. 1884 | Hindoo |
| Sire Orby (GB) ch. 1904 | Rhoda B. br. 1895 | Hanover ch. 1884 | Bourbon Belle |
| Sire Orby (GB) ch. 1904 | Rhoda B. br. 1895 | Margerine b. 1886 | Algerine |
| Sire Orby (GB) ch. 1904 | Rhoda B. br. 1895 | Margerine b. 1886 | Sweet Songstress |
| Dam Grand Geraldine (GB) 1905 | Desmond blk. 1896 | St. Simon br. 1881 | Galopin* |
| Dam Grand Geraldine (GB) 1905 | Desmond blk. 1896 | St. Simon br. 1881 | St. Angela |
| Dam Grand Geraldine (GB) 1905 | Desmond blk. 1896 | L'Abbesse de Jouarre blk. 1886 | Trappist |
| Dam Grand Geraldine (GB) 1905 | Desmond blk. 1896 | L'Abbesse de Jouarre blk. 1886 | Festive |
| Dam Grand Geraldine (GB) 1905 | Grand Marnier blk. 1900 | Friar's Balsam ch. 1885 | Hermit |
| Dam Grand Geraldine (GB) 1905 | Grand Marnier blk. 1900 | Friar's Balsam ch. 1885 | Flower of Dorset |
| Dam Grand Geraldine (GB) 1905 | Grand Marnier blk. 1900 | Galopin mare br. 1887 | Galopin* |
| Dam Grand Geraldine (GB) 1905 | Grand Marnier blk. 1900 | Galopin mare br. 1887 | Mother Superior(Family:5-c) |

Note: b. = Bay, blk. = Black, br. = Brown, ch. = Chestnut

* Grand Parade was inbred 4x4x4 to 1875 Epsom Derby winner Galopin. This means that the stallion appears three times in the fourth generation of his pedigree.
