= Orby (horse) =

British-bred Thoroughbred racehorse

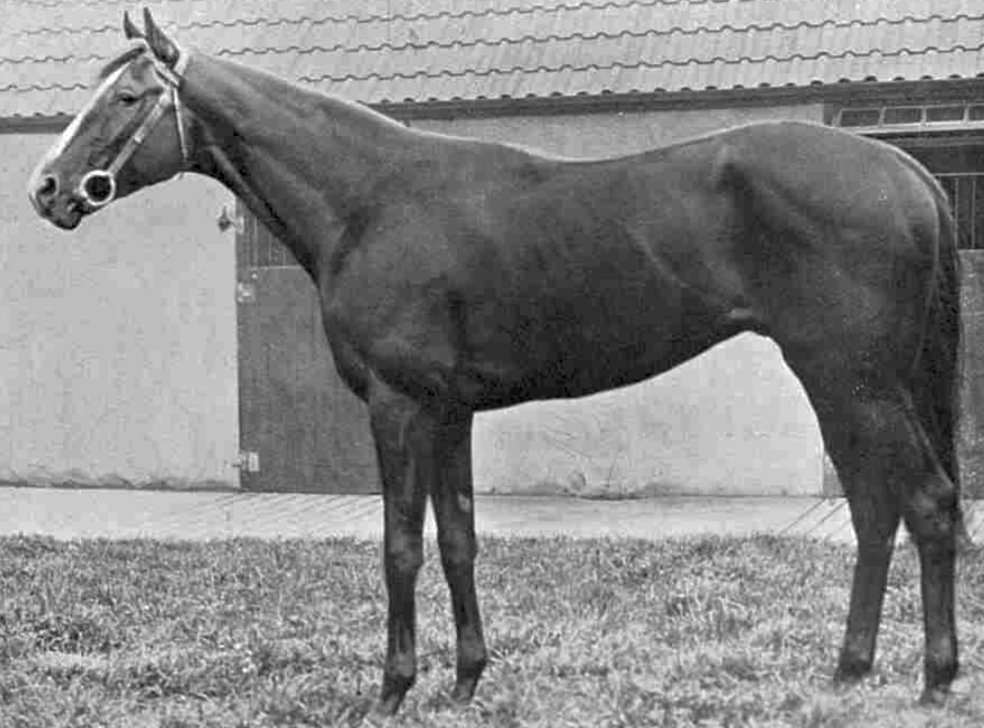
- Orby in 1907.
- Sire: Orme
- Grandsire: Ormonde
- Dam: Rhoda B.
- Damsire: Hanover
- Sex: Stallion
- Foaled: 1904
- Country: United Kingdom of Great Britain and Ireland
- Colour: Chestnut
- Breeder: Richard Croker
- Owner: Richard Croker
- Trainer: Frederick McCabe
- Record: 7: 4-0-3
- Earnings: £

Major wins
- Epsom Derby (1907); Irish Derby (1907)

Honours
- Orby Stakes at The Curragh

Orby (1904–1918) was an Anglo-Irish Thoroughbred racehorse and sire. In a racing career which lasted from 1906 to 1907 he ran seven times and won four races. In 1907 he became the first Irish-trained horse, and the third owned by an American, to win The Derby. In the same year, he became the first horse to complete the Epsom Derby-Irish Derby double, but his racing career was ended by training problems after one further race. He went on to become a successful breeding stallion.

== Background ==
Orby, a rangy, well-made chestnut horse with a narrow white blaze was bred by his owner, the American politician Richard "Boss" Croker and raised at his Glencairn Stud. Although sometimes referred to as "Irish-bred", Orby was actually born in England and brought back with his mother to Ireland when still a foal. Croker was a controversial figure who based his racing and breeding operations in Ireland after being refused permission by the Jockey Club to set up in Newmarket. He was briefly in training with Henry “Atty” Persse, and then with Jim Parkinson at Maddenstown, County Kildare before being sent to Fred McCabe at his Glencairn Lodge Stables at Sandyford, near Dublin.

Orby’s sire, Orme, was a successful racehorse whose victories included the Eclipse Stakes (twice), and the Champion Stakes. At stud he was the champion sire in 1899, the year in which his best son Flying Fox won the Triple Crown. Orby’s dam the American-bred Rhoda B., also produced the 1000 Guineas winner Rhodora.

== Racing career ==
=== 1906: two-year-old season ===
Orby was a backward (immature) two-year-old with fragile hooves and his trainer at the time, Jim Parkinson, only raced him at the insistence of the colt’s owner “Boss” Croker. The colt finished third at Leopardstown on hard ground, returning to the paddock with his feet bleeding, and third again in a race at the Curragh.

=== 1907: three-year-old season ===
==== Spring ====
Orby was trained at three by Fred McCabe. Early in the season he was mentioned as a potential Derby contender, being offered at odds of around 20/1 although he had not been entered in the 2000 Guineas. On his debut he was sent to England and won the Earl of Sefton Plate at Liverpool. He then returned to Ireland in May for the Baldoyle Plate over a mile and a half at Baldoyle Racecourse, north of Dublin. He started at odds of 8/18 against a "useful field" Orby was an easy and impressive winner and he became regarded as a serious Derby prospect.

Croker backed the colt heavily and spent 2,500 guineas to buy a successful racehorse called Hayden to act as Orby's lead horse in training. When sending the colt to England, Croker arranged for him to be accompanied by a bodyguard consisting of seventeen "stout Irishmen" to ensure his security.

==== Summer ====
On a "cold, wet, windy and miserable" day at Epsom, Orby started at odds of 100/9 (approximately 11/1) in a field of nine, with the 2000 Guineas winner Slieve Gallion starting the 8/13 favourite on rain-softened ground. The crowd was reported to be unusually sober and formal; the spectators for this "silk-hatted Derby" including the King and the Prince of Wales. Ridden by the American John Reiff– Danny Maher had reportedly turned down the ride– Orby was settled in fifth or sixth place in the early stages as first John Bull and then Slieve Gallion led the field. Reiff moved Orby into the third place just after half way and took the lead when Slieve Gallion ran wide entering the straight. Orby opened up a clear lead and stayed on to win "cleverly" by two lengths from Wool Winder with Slieve Gallion finishing third. Although many were of the view that Sleive Gallion had failed to stay, his trainer, Sam Darling offered no excuses and said that he had been "beaten by a better horse." Wool Winder made up a great deal of ground in the straight and was felt by some to have been an unlucky loser. Croker, who reportedly landed bets of £40,000 on the race gave his winning prize money to charity.

Shortly after Orby's win, Croker challenged the owner of Slieve Gallion to a match race between the colts for "a substantial sum" over any distance. The challenge was not accepted. Orby bypassed a possible run at Royal Ascot and instead became the first Epsom Derby winner to also win the Irish Derby at the Curragh, justifying his position as 1/10 favourite.

==== Autumn ====
Before his next race, stories began to circulate that Orby was a "whistler", suggesting that he was developing respiratory problems ("touched in the wind"). Orby was back in England before the end of July and started 4/7 favourite for the Atlantic Stakes at Liverpool. He finished last of the four runners behind Linacre, a colt who had finished third to Slieve Gallion in the 2000 Guineas and to whom Orby was conceding eighteen pounds. A veterinary examination was undertaken, and his owner was advised that the colt needed to be rested. Croker however, insisted on having Orby prepared for the St Leger, a race in which he was scheduled to have a much-anticipated rematch with Wool Winder.

Shortly before the St Leger, Orby broke down badly in training, sustaining injuries which forced his withdrawal. One contemporary report suggests that the colt was also suffering from "kidney trouble." At the end of the season it was said to be "improbable" that Orby would return to racing and although there were hopes of a return in the early part of 1908, he was retired to stud.

== Assessment ==
In their book A Century of Champions, John Randall and Tony Morris rated Orby on 133, making him an “average” Derby winner but the best Irish-trained horse of the first half of the 20th century. Despite Orby's lack of success at two, Jim Parkinson, who trained him in 1906 was reported to have regarded him as "by far and away the best he had ever tried or ever known."

Orby earned £6,717 in win prize money in 1907, placing him seventh in the British list of highest earners behind Lally, Wool Winder, Sancy, Lesbia, Slieve Gallion and White Eagle.

== Stud career ==
Orby stood as a stallion at his owner's Glencairn Stud. He proved to be reasonably successful, siring the Classic winners Grand Parade (Derby) and Diadem (1000 Guineas) and being regarded as a good source of speed. He sired the winners of at least seventy races and £30,000 in prize money. Orby died at Sandyford on 6 April 1918.

== Pedigree ==
Pedigree of Orby (GB), chestnut stallion, 1904
Sire Orme (GB) b. 1889	Ormonde b. 1883	Bend Or ch. 1877	Doncaster*
Sire Orme (GB) b. 1889	Ormonde b. 1883	Bend Or ch. 1877	Rouge Rose
Sire Orme (GB) b. 1889	Ormonde b. 1883	Lily Agnes b. 1871	Macaroni
Sire Orme (GB) b. 1889	Ormonde b. 1883	Lily Agnes b. 1871	Polly Agnes
Sire Orme (GB) b. 1889	Angelica b. 1879	Galopin br. 1872	Vedette
Sire Orme (GB) b. 1889	Angelica b. 1879	Galopin br. 1872	Flying Duchess
Sire Orme (GB) b. 1889	Angelica b. 1879	St. Angela b. 1865	King Tom
Sire Orme (GB) b. 1889	Angelica b. 1879	St. Angela b. 1865	Adeline
Dam Rhoda B. (USA) b. 1895	Hanover ch. 1884	Hindoo b. 1878	Virgil
Dam Rhoda B. (USA) b. 1895	Hanover ch. 1884	Hindoo b. 1878	Florence
Dam Rhoda B. (USA) b. 1895	Hanover ch. 1884	Bourbon Belle b. 1869	Bonnie Scotland
Dam Rhoda B. (USA) b. 1895	Hanover ch. 1884	Bourbon Belle b. 1869	Ella D
Dam Rhoda B. (USA) b. 1895	Margerine b. 1886	Algerine b. 1873	Abd-El-Kader
Dam Rhoda B. (USA) b. 1895	Margerine b. 1886	Algerine b. 1873	Nina
Dam Rhoda B. (USA) b. 1895	Margerine b. 1886	Sweet Songstress b. 1879	Doncaster*
Dam Rhoda B. (USA) b. 1895	Margerine b. 1886	Sweet Songstress b. 1879	Melodious (Family: 26)

Note: b. = Bay, br. = Brown, ch. = Chestnut

* Orby was inbred 4 × 4 to 1873 Epsom Derby winner Doncaster. This means that the stallion appears twice in the fourth generation of his pedigree.
