= General Harman =

General Harman may refer to:

- George Harman (British Army officer) (1830–1892), British Army lieutenant general
- Jack Harman (British Army officer) (1920–2009), British Army general
- Wentworth Harman (1872–1961), British Army lieutenant general
- William Henry Harman (1828–1865), Virginia Militia brigadier general on the side of the Confederacy in the American Civil War

== See also ==
- General Harmon (disambiguation)
