= May Hill (horse) =

British-bred Thoroughbred racehorse

- Racing silks of Percival Williams
- Sire: Hill Clown
- Grandsire: Hillary
- Dam: Mabel
- Damsire: French Beige
- Sex: Mare
- Foaled: 1972
- Country: United Kingdom
- Colour: Bay
- Breeder: Percival Williams
- Owner: Percival Williams
- Trainer: Peter Walwyn
- Record: 13:4-3-4

Major wins
- Duke of Edinburgh Stakes (1974); Yorkshire Oaks (1975); Park Hill Stakes (1975)

Awards
- Timeform rating 102 p (1974), 124 (1975), 106 (1976); Top-rated British three-year-old filly (1975)

Honours
- May Hill Stakes at Doncaster Racecourse

May Hill (foaled 1972) was a British Thoroughbred racehorse and broodmare. In a racing career which lasted from October 1974 until October 1976 she won four of her thirteen races and was placed on seven occasions. She won her only race as a two-year-old but showed moderate form in the early part of her three-year-old season. In the late summer and autumn of 1975, however, she emerged as a top-class filly, winning the Yorkshire Oaks and the Park Hill Stakes and was subsequently rated the best British filly of her generation. She remained in training in 1976, but failed to win in five races. She was then retired to stud and had some success as a broodmare. She is commemorated in the May Hill Stakes, a race for two-year-old fillies at Doncaster Racecourse.

== Background ==
May Hill was a "well-made, good-quartered" bay mare, with a white star and snip and three white socks, bred in England by her owner Percival Williams. She was probably the best horse sired by the American horse Hill Clown, who won the Sunset Handicap in 1967 before being sent to the United Kingdom. May Hill was the third of four foals produced by her dam Mabel, a high-class racemare who won the Yorkshire Oaks in 1965 and was placed in the Oaks Stakes, 1000 Guineas and Park Hill Stakes.

Like Williams' other good horses, which included Pasty, May Hill was sent into training with Peter Walwyn at Lambourn in Berkshire.

== Racing career ==
=== 1974: two-year-old season ===
May Hill made her racecourse debut over six furlongs at Ascot Racecourse on 9 October 1974 in the Duke of Edinburgh Stakes (not the current race of the same name) for two-year-old colts and fillies which had not run before 22 September 1974. Ridden by the Welsh jockey Geoff Lewis, she started a 20/1 outsider and produced an impressive burst of acceleration in the closing stages to win by a length from the colt Red Lever, who was conceding eight pounds.

=== 1975: three-year-old season ===
May Hill took time to reach her best form in 1975. On her seasonal debut she contested the Fred Darling Stakes over seven furlongs at Newbury Racecourse in April and finished second, beaten three lengths by the Italian-trained filly Carnauba. She bypassed the 1000 Guineas at Newmarket Racecourse and reappeared in the Musidora Stakes over ten and a half furlongs at York Racecourse in May. As in her previous appearance, she looked short of peak condition and finished second, but produced a better performance and was only beaten a head by the winner Moonlight Night.

On 7 June, May Hill contested the 197th running of the Oaks Stakes at Epsom. Looking unsuited by the firm ground, she turned into the straight in eleventh place and although she made sty progress in the closing stages she finished a distant fourth behind Juliette Marny, Val's Girl and Moonlight Night. The filly then returned to winning form in a minor race over a mile and a half at Haydock Park Racecourse, winning easily from her only opponent. In August at York Racecourse, May Hill faced Juliette Marny again in the Yorkshire Oaks, and started at odds of 4/1. Ridden by Pat Eddery, she won the race by one and a half lengths from Light Duty, with Juliette Marny in third. The result was only confirmed after a stewards' inquiry into possible interference caused when May Hill hung to the left in the closing stages.

In September, May Hill was moved up in distance for the Park Hill Stakes over fourteen and a half furlongs at Doncaster Racecourse. Starting at odds of 13/8 she was restrained by Eddery for most of the race before taking the lead two furlongs from the finish and winning impressively by one and a half lengths from the Irish-trained filly Tuscarora. Later that month, May Hill was sent to France to contest the Prix Vermeille at Longchamp Racecourse. She started the 4/1 third favourite and ran well, but proved no match for the two leading French fillies and finished third, beaten one and a half lengths and eight lengths by Ivanjica and Nobiliary.

=== 1976: four-year-old season ===
May Hill remained in training as a four-year-old, and was campaigned mainly in staying races, but failed to win in five attempts. On her seasonal debut she finished third to Marco Ricci and Major Green in the Paradise Stakes over two miles at Ascot in May and then ran second on her next appearance. She then sustained a serious injury when running third behind Mr Bigmore in the Lymm Stakes at Haydock. She was then off the racecourse until autumn, when the best of her two runs came when she finished third to Bright Finish and Shangamuzo in the Jockey Club Cup.

== Assessment ==
There was no International Classification of European two-year-olds in 1974: the official handicappers of Britain, Ireland and France compiled separate rankings for horses which competed in those countries. In the British Free Handicap May Hill was allotted a weight of 111 pounds, twenty pounds behind the top-rated filly Cry of Truth. The independent Timeform organisation gave her a rating of 102 p, (the "p" indicating that she was likely to make more than usual improvement) placing her twenty-seven pounds behind Cry of Truth and thirty-one behind the French-trained Broadway Dancer. In their annual Racehorses of 1974 Timeform argued at length that the official handicap had over-rated the filly and several other lightly raced animals, and had become an exercise in attracting runners for the European Free Handicap (for which only horses given a rating were eligible) rather than an accurate assessment of the season's best juveniles. In 1975, the official British handicap rated May Hill the best three-year-old filly of the season, equal with Rose Bowl and nine pounds below the leading colt Grundy. Timeform gave her a rating of 124, nine pounds behind their top-rated three-year-old filly Rose Bowl. In 1976, May Hill was rated 106 by Timeform and did not receive a rating in the official British handicap.

== Breeding record ==
May Hill produced at least five foals and three winners from 1981 to 1989:

- Apodemus (gelding, foaled in 1981, sired by Record Token)
- Picea (bay colt, 1983, by Mummy's Pet), won three races
- Bint Naas (filly, 1986, by Lomond)
- Rising Tempo (bay gelding, 1988, by Lomond), won four races
- May Hills Legacy (bay filly, 1989, by Be My Guest), won three races

== Pedigree ==
Pedigree of May Hill (GB), bay mare, 1972
Sire Hill Clown (USA) 1963	Hillary (USA); 1952	Khaled	Hyperion
Sire Hill Clown (USA) 1963	Hillary (USA); 1952	Khaled	Eclair
Sire Hill Clown (USA) 1963	Hillary (USA); 1952	Snow Bunny	Boswell
Sire Hill Clown (USA) 1963	Hillary (USA); 1952	Snow Bunny	La Rose
Sire Hill Clown (USA) 1963	Mary Machree (USA); 1951	Moonlight Run	Bobsleigh
Sire Hill Clown (USA) 1963	Mary Machree (USA); 1951	Moonlight Run	Selene
Sire Hill Clown (USA) 1963	Mary Machree (USA); 1951	Jessie-o-Doon	Brig o'Doon
Sire Hill Clown (USA) 1963	Mary Machree (USA); 1951	Jessie-o-Doon	Editrix
Dam Mabel (GB) 1962	French Beige (GB); 1953	Bois Roussel	Vatout
Dam Mabel (GB) 1962	French Beige (GB); 1953	Bois Roussel	Plucky Liege
Dam Mabel (GB) 1962	French Beige (GB); 1953	Nivea	Nearco
Dam Mabel (GB) 1962	French Beige (GB); 1953	Nivea	Diva
Dam Mabel (GB) 1962	Aunt May (GB); 1955	Grey Sovereign	Nasrullah
Dam Mabel (GB) 1962	Aunt May (GB); 1955	Grey Sovereign	Kong
Dam Mabel (GB) 1962	Aunt May (GB); 1955	Mrs Mops	Colombo
Dam Mabel (GB) 1962	Aunt May (GB); 1955	Mrs Mops	Charwoman (Family: 15-a)
