= Pasty (horse) =

British-bred Thoroughbred racehorse

- Sire: Raffingora
- Grandsire: Grey Sovereign
- Dam: Ma Marie
- Damsire: My Babu
- Sex: Mare
- Foaled: 1 May 1973
- Died: 12 February 1993 (Aged 19)
- Country: United Kingdom
- Colour: Grey
- Breeder: Percival Williams
- Owner: Percival Williams
- Trainer: Peter Walwyn
- Record: 10:5-0-0

Major wins
- Lavant Stakes (1975); Lowther Stakes (1975); Cheveley Park Stakes (1975)

Awards
- Timeform rating 122 (1975); Top-rated British two-year-old filly (1975)

Pasty (1 May 1973 – 12 February 1993) was a British Thoroughbred racehorse and broodmare. She was the leading two-year-old filly of her generation in Britain in 1975 when she was undefeated in five races, including the Lavant Stakes, Lowther Stakes and Cheveley Park Stakes. She failed to progress as a three-year-old and finished no better than fourth in her five races. She was then retired to become a broodmare and produced at least three minor winners.

== Background ==
Pasty was a "neat, well-made" grey mare bred in England by her owner Percival Williams. She was from the second crop of foals sired by Raffingora, a very fast horse who won the King George Stakes and several major handicap races, including the Cherkley Sprint Handicap at Epsom Downs Racecourse when he ran five furlongs in 53.89 seconds under a weight of 140 pounds. He was beginning to make a mark as a breeding stallion in Europe when he was exported to Japan in 1973. Pasty's dam Ma Marie was a granddaughter of the broodmare Scotia's Glen, whose other descendants included the 2000 Guineas winner Our Babu and the Eclipse Stakes winner King of the Tudors.

Like Williams' other good horses, which included May Hill, Pasty was sent into training with Peter Walwyn at Lambourn in Berkshire.

== Racing career ==
=== 1975: two-year-old season ===
In June, Pasty began her racing career in the Dr Abernethy Maiden Plate over five furlongs at Wolverhampton Racecourse. Racing against moderate opposition, she took the lead in the final furlong and won by one and a half lengths. In July, she won a minor race over five furlongs at Sandown Park Racecourse and was then moved up in class for the Lavant Stakes over the same distance at Goodwood Racecourse. Receiving weight from her three opponents, she started odds-on favourite and won by one and a half lengths from the Ian Balding-trained Key to the Kingdom. In August, Pasty, ridden by Pat Eddery, started at odds of 15/8 for the Group Two Lowther Stakes over six furlongs at York Racecourse. She was one of five fillies still in contention a furlong from the finish and drew ahead to win by a length from the Seaton Delaval Stakes winner Sweet Nightingale, from whom she was receiving three pounds.

In October, the filly was again ridden by Eddery when she started at odds of 9/1 for the Cheveley Park Stakes, which was then the only Group One race in Britain restricted to two-year-old fillies. The race attracted an international field, including the Irish filly Petipa (winner of the Moyglare Stud Stakes), who started favourite, and the French challenger Guichet. The British runners included Nagwa (already the winner of nine races), Outer Circle (Princess Margaret Stakes), Hayloft (Molecomb Stakes) and Western Jewel (runner-up to the colt Vitiges in the Group One Prix Robert Papin). Despite an unfavourable draw on the outside of the fourteen-runner field, Pasty took the lead two furlongs from the finish and held off several challengers to win by a neck from the 33/1 outsider Dame Foolish, with Solar a neck away in third.

=== 1976: three-year-old season ===
Pasty began her three-year-old season in the Fred Darling Stakes over seven furlongs at Newbury Racecourse in April, finishing fourth behind Rowantree, Solar and Manilata. In the 1000 Guineas over the Rowley Mile course at Newmarket, Pasty started 12/1 as the second favourite but made little impression, finishing twentieth of the twenty-five runners behind the French-trained favourite Flying Water. She ran poorly at Royal Ascot again, finishing last of the eight runners behind Kesar Queen. She was then dropped in class but did not recover her form, finishing unplaced in two handicap races over six furlongs.

== Assessment ==
There was no International Classification of European two-year-olds in 1975: the official handicappers of Britain, Ireland and France compiled separate rankings for horses which competed in those countries. In the British Free Handicap, Pasty was the top-rated two-year-old filly, a pound ahead of Dame Foolish and eight behind the leading colt Wollow. The independent Timeform organisation awarded her a rating of 122, six pounds below the French filly Theia. Timeform did not award the filly a rating as a three-year-old.

== Breeding record ==
Pasty retired from racing to become a broodmare and produced at least ten foals from 1978 to 1991. Pasty died in Australia on 12 February 1993.

- Cornish Granite (grey colt, foaled in 1978, sired by Ragstone), won one race
- June Fayre (bay filly, 1979, by Sagaro), failed to win in two races
- Addaana (grey filly, 1981, by Mill Reef), won one race
- Giovanni (grey gelding, 1982, by Star Appeal), failed to win in nine races
- Fargad (colt, 1983, by Troy), failed to win in four races
- Denomination (colt, 1985, by Dominion)
- Dominion Fayre (bay filly, 1986, by Dominion), failed to win in six races
- Myth and Merriment (colt, 1988, by Ahonoora)
- Noble Choice (grey filly, 1990, by Danger's Hour), raced in Australia
- Bold Zoffany (grey gelding, 1991, by Zoffany), winner in Australia

== Pedigree ==
Pedigree of Pasty (GB), grey mare, 1973
Sire Raffingora (GB) 1965	Grey Sovereign (GB); 1948	Nasrullah	Nearco
Sire Raffingora (GB) 1965	Grey Sovereign (GB); 1948	Nasrullah	Mumtaz Begum
Sire Raffingora (GB) 1965	Grey Sovereign (GB); 1948	Kong	Baytown
Sire Raffingora (GB) 1965	Grey Sovereign (GB); 1948	Kong	Clang
Sire Raffingora (GB) 1965	Cameo (GB); 1955	Como	Sir Cosmo
Sire Raffingora (GB) 1965	Cameo (GB); 1955	Como	Maia
Sire Raffingora (GB) 1965	Cameo (GB); 1955	Record Serenade	Straight Deal
Sire Raffingora (GB) 1965	Cameo (GB); 1955	Record Serenade	Columbia
Dam Ma Marie (GB) 1956	My Babu (FR); 1945	Djebel	Tourbillon
Dam Ma Marie (GB) 1956	My Babu (FR); 1945	Djebel	Loika
Dam Ma Marie (GB) 1956	My Babu (FR); 1945	Perfume	Badruddin
Dam Ma Marie (GB) 1956	My Babu (FR); 1945	Perfume	Lavendula
Dam Ma Marie (GB) 1956	Marie d'Ecosse (GB); 1947	Mieuxce	Massine
Dam Ma Marie (GB) 1956	Marie d'Ecosse (GB); 1947	Mieuxce	L'Olivete
Dam Ma Marie (GB) 1956	Marie d'Ecosse (GB); 1947	Scotia's Glen	Beresford
Dam Ma Marie (GB) 1956	Marie d'Ecosse (GB); 1947	Scotia's Glen	Queen Scotia (Family: 19-b)
