= General Harmon =

General Harmon may refer to:

- Ernest N. Harmon (1894–1979), U.S. Army major general
- Hubert R. Harmon (1892–1957), U.S. Air Force lieutenant general
- Millard Harmon (1888–1945), U.S. Army Air Forces lieutenant general
- Reginald C. Harmon (1900–1992), U.S. Air Force major general

== See also ==
- General Harman (disambiguation)
