= Netheravon House =

Historic building in Wiltshire, England

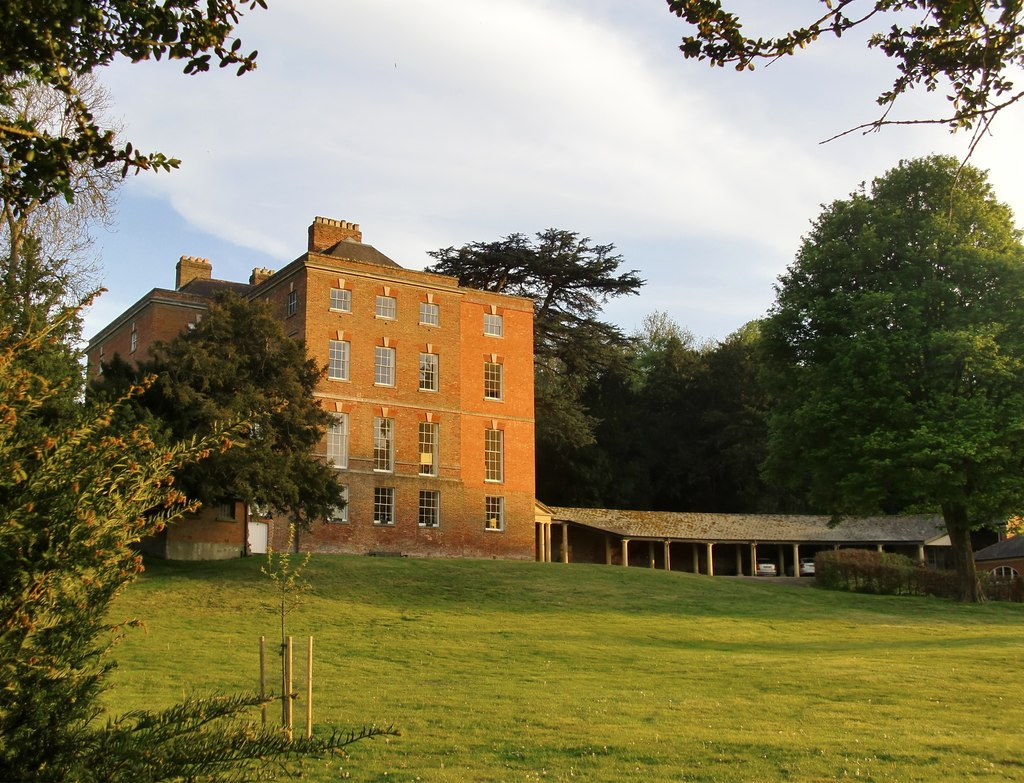
- The house in May 2017

- Shown in Wiltshire
- 51.2336°N 1.7903°W
- Location: Lower Road, Netheravon

History
- Built: c.1734

Site notes
- Architectural style: Neoclassical style

Listed Building – Grade II*
- Designated: 3 June 1986
- Reference no.: 1299956

Netheravon House is a Grade II listed building in Netheravon, Wiltshire, England.

== History ==
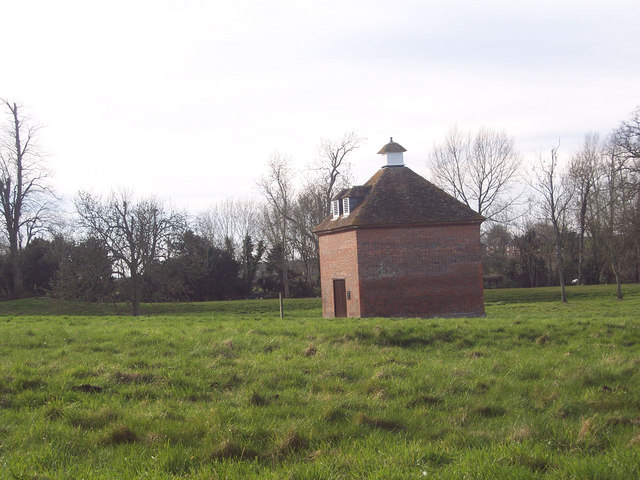
The dovecote at Netheravon House

The house was commissioned as a hunting lodge by Henry Scudamore, 3rd Duke of Beaufort. The site he selected had been occupied by a Roman villa and later by a manor house. It was designed in the neoclassical style, built in red brick and completed in around 1734. The grounds were laid out before 1755 by Thomas Wright. In 1791 a block was added in the centre of the north front, for Michael Hicks Beach to designs of John Soane. The three-storey house is built in brick and has five bays to its south entrance front, where there is a pedimented porch.

An 18th-century dovecote stands in the grounds to the north of the house. The large stable block, added some time between 1734 and 1740, is also in brick, and surrounds four sides of a courtyard with a narrow opening to the north. A colonnade links the house and stables.

Following the purchase of much of the parish by the War Department in 1898, the house and stables became the home of the Cavalry School from 1904. The Cavalry School was amalgamated with the Royal Artillery Riding Establishment to become the Army School of Equitation at Weedon in 1922. The building was subsequently used by the Machine Gun School, which had been based at Grantham until 1919, and then at Seaford.

In 1975, the house began to serve as the Officers' Mess for the Support Weapons Wing of the School of Infantry. Avon Camp closed in the 1990s and the house, stables and grounds were sold by the Ministry of Defence. In 2004 the house was converted into two homes and the stables into seven.

In 1986 the house was recorded as Grade II* listed, and the stables and dovecote Grade II.

A November 2020 article in Country Life magazine provided an update, with photographs, on the property. By that time the 11,188 square foot home had been extensively renovated; the north wing remained a separate residence.
