= Jack Harman (British Army officer) =

British Army general (1920–2009)

General Sir Jack Harman GCB OBE MC
- Born: 20 July 1920; Farnham, Surrey, England
- Died: 28 December 2009 (aged 89); Dinton, Wiltshire, England
- Military career
- Nickname: "Jackie"
- Military career
- Allegiance: United Kingdom
- Branch: British Army
- Service years: 1940–1981
- Rank: General
- Service number: 123536
- Units: 2nd Dragoon Guards (Queen's Bays); 1st The Queen's Dragoon Guards
- Commands: Deputy Supreme Allied Commander, Europe (1978–1981); 1st (British) Corps (1974–1976); Royal Military Academy Sandhurst (1972–1973); 1st Division (1970–1972); 11th Infantry Brigade Group (1965–1966); 1st The Queen's Dragoon Guards (1960–1962)
- Conflicts: Second World War
- Awards: Knight Grand Cross of the Order of the Bath; Officer of the Order of the British Empire; Military Cross

General Sir Jack Wentworth Harman, GCB, OBE, MC (20 July 1920 – 28 December 2009) was a British Army officer who served as Adjutant-General to the Forces from 1976 to 1978. He began his military career in 1940, serving in The Queen's Bays for the majority of his early career and saw service with them during Second World War in the Middle East, Europe and Africa. Following the war Harman held various appointments at regimental, divisional and corps, level rising to fulfil the role of Adjutant-General to the Forces in 1976. His final position was as Deputy Supreme Allied Commander Europe, which he held until retirement in 1981. In later life he served as a director of an insurance brokers and vice-chairman of the National Army Museum and the Automobile Association before he died in 2009, at the age of 89.

== Early life ==
Harman was the son of Lieutenant General Sir Wentworth Harman. He was educated at Wellington College, Berkshire.

== Military career ==
Upon completion of training at the Royal Military College, Sandhurst, Jack Harman was commissioned into the 2nd Dragoon Guards (Queen's Bays) on 2 March 1940. Promoted to lieutenant on 2 September 1941, he served in the Second World War and was awarded the Military Cross in August 1943, "in recognition of gallant and distinguished services in the Middle East." He joined the 24th Lancers in mid July 1944. However, when that regiment was disbanded just a few weeks later he re-joined the Bay's for the Italian Campaign and was involved in the Spring 1945 offensive. During the Second World War, Harman served with the 2nd Armoured Brigade in the Western Desert and the Italian Campaign.

Harman was promoted to captain on 1 July 1946 and to major on 2 March 1953. He was appointed commanding officer (CO) of 1st The Queen's Dragoon Guards in 1960, and, having promoted to colonel on 22 January 1965 (with seniority from 7 May 1963) he became Commander 11th Infantry Brigade in 1965. Promoted to brigadier on 31 December 1966, after attending the Imperial Defence College in 1967 he became Assistant Chief of Staff, Intelligence and Operations in January 1968.

Promoted to major-general on 12 February 1970 (with seniority from 25 August 1969) Harman served as general officer commanding, 1st Division from 1970 until 1972 and as Commandant of the Royal Military Academy Sandhurst between 1972 and 1973. During his tenure, and with his assistance, the Army Board cut the commissioning course from two years to one year. Promoted to lieutenant general on 24 January 1974 (with seniority from 24 January 1973), he served as General Officer Commanding (GOC) of 1 (British) Corps from 1974, until 1976.

On 1 November 1975, Harman was appointed the colonel, 1st The Queen's Dragoon Guards. Promoted to full general on 15 July 1976 (with seniority from 25 March 1976) he was appointed Adjutant-General to the Forces that same year. Finally he served as Deputy Supreme Allied Commander Europe from 1978 to 1981. He retired from the British Army on 7 May 1981.

He was also aide-de-camp general to the Queen from 1977 to 1980.

He was appointed as an Officer of the Order of the British Empire in 1962, as a Knight Commander of the Order of the Bath in 1974 and as a Knight Grand Cross of the Order of the Bath in 1978.

== Later life ==
Upon retirement from the military, Harman became a Director of Wilsons Hogg Robinson, an insurance brokers; a position he filled from 1982 to 1988. He was vice-chairman of the National Army Museum from 1980 to 1987. He also held the post of vice-chairman of The Automobile Association between 1986 and 1989.

== Family ==
In 1947, he was married to Gwladys May Murphy; widow of Lieutenant-Colonel RJ Murphy and was the daughter of Sir Idwal Lloyd. In 2001 he married again, this time to Sheila Perkins (née Gurdon), widow of Major Christopher Perkins. He has a daughter from his first marriage and two stepdaughters from his second. He died in his sleep the morning of 28 December 2009.

Military offices
Preceded by Allan Taylor	General Officer Commanding 1st Division; 1970–1972	Succeeded by Edwin Bramall
Preceded by Philip Tower	Commandant of the Royal Military Academy Sandhurst; 1972–1973	Succeeded by Robert Ford
Preceded by Sir Roland Gibbs	General Officer Commanding 1st (British) Corps; 1974–1976	Succeeded by Sir Richard Worsley
Preceded by Sir Cecil Blacker	Adjutant General; 1976–1978	Succeeded by Sir Robert Ford
Preceded by Sir Harry Tuzo	Deputy Supreme Allied Commander Europe; 1978–1981	Succeeded by Sir Peter Terry
