= Army School of Equitation =

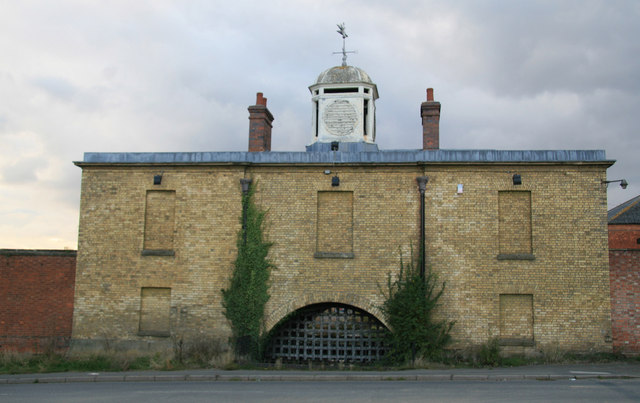
- The canal gateway at Weedon

Site information
- Type: Barracks
- Owner: Ministry of Defence
- Operator: British Army

Location
- Location within Northamptonshire
- Coordinates: 52.2325°N 1.0834°W

Site history
- Built: 1922
- Built for: War Office
- In use: 1922 to 1940

Garrison information
- Occupants: Depot of the Intelligence Corps

The Army School of Equitation was a British Army school at Weedon in Northamptonshire, created in 1922 and closed in 1940. In the worlds of cavalry and horses it was commonly called simply Weedon.

== History ==
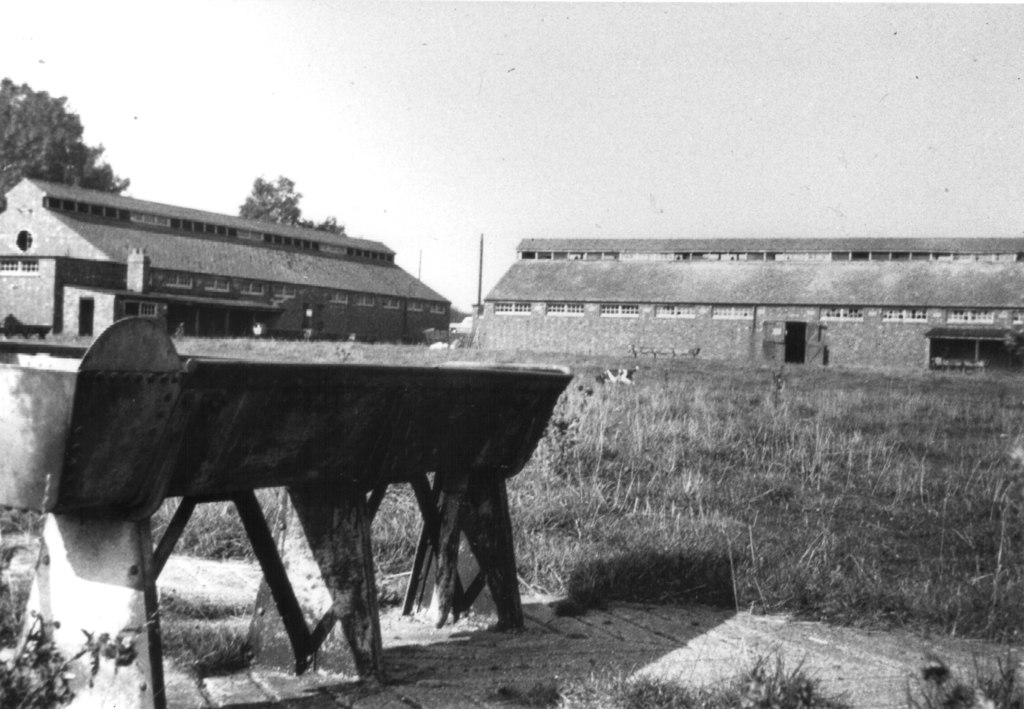
The stables of the Army School of Equitation photographed in 1974

The site had its origins in the Military Ordnance Depot established there in 1805. By 1919, it was also the home of the Royal Artillery Riding Establishment after the riding school at the Royal Artillery Barracks in Woolwich was designated solely for the purposes of teaching cadets at the Royal Military Academy, Woolwich to ride.

In December 1922, the Royal Artillery Riding Establishment amalgamated with the Cavalry School, previously based at Netheravon House in Wiltshire, to form the Army School of Equitation at Weedon. The first Commandant was Colonel Charles Walwyn, known as "Taffy".

The choice of location gave an area with good riding country, in the heart of England, served not only by the Grand Union Canal and Weedon railway station but also by a branch line to the military depot.

The school came to be seen as the leading centre of British horsemanship and was described as "the Mecca of cavalrymen throughout the Empire".

The Great Britain equestrian team at the 1936 Summer Olympics in Berlin was raised from the Army School of Equitation at Weedon, with Philip Bowden-Smith, a former Chief Instructor at Weedon, as team captain. It won the Bronze Medal in the team eventing.

Weedon closed in 1940. Its demonstration horses were dispersed and were noted for their high standard of accuracy in performing the school movements. Ten years later, the term "Weedon seat" was still being used for the style of riding taught at Weedon. Instead of the old-fashioned "backward seat", it taught a version of the "forward seat" developed by Federico Caprilli in the Italian Army's school at Pinerolo.

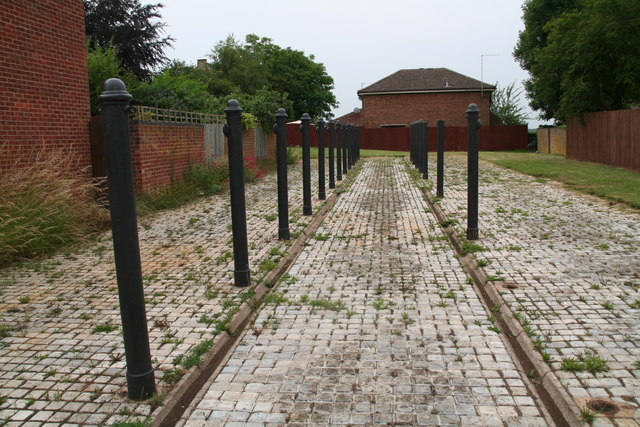
The floor of the former stables, now a feature within a housing estate

Weedon gained fame through the achievements of its pupils, including Harry Llewellyn and his horse Foxhunter.

In 1950, John Board wrote that "All English riding to-day is based on the teaching of Weedon." In 1952, he added that "nearly all of our best horsemen" had graduated from the school, adding "Now there is no Weedon."

== Commandants ==
- 1922–1923 : Charles Walwyn
- 1923: George Alexander Weir, CMG, DSO
- 1926–1930: Wentworth Harman
- 1934–1938: John Blakiston-Houston
- 1938–1939: James Joseph Kingstone

== Question to War Secretary ==
On Tuesday 25 July 1939, in the House of Commons Somerset de Chair asked Leslie Hore-Belisha, Secretary of State for War "whether it has been definitely decided to close down the Equitation School at Weedon; and, if so, whether he will consider establishing a training and remounts depot there to supply the remaining horsed cavalry regiments." The reply was

"The establishment at Weedon comprises an equitation school, where officers and other ranks are trained as instructors in equitation; and a remount wing. The transfer of the school and remount wing elsewhere has not yet been finally approved. A depot squadron for training cavalry recruits has been opened at Edinburgh."

Chair then asked "May I take it that, if it is decided to transfer the establishment from Weedon, it is not proposed to abolish the Equitation School as such?" The reply to this was

"I hope that my honourable Friend will not read into the answer more than it contains."

== Aftermath ==
The Equine Training Squadron of the Defence Animal Training Regiment, based at Melton Mowbray, has stabling for 140 horses and grazing for 260. It provides training for all riders and horses going to the Household Cavalry (Life Guards and Blues and Royals) and the King's Troop, Royal Horse Artillery. When Anne, Princess Royal, formally opened a riding school there in 2008, it was referred to as "the new Army School of Equitation Riding School at the Defence Animal Centre".

== See also ==
- Irish Army Equitation School
