= Joe Kingstone =

British Army officer (1892–1966)

Brigadier Joe Kingstone CBE DSO* MC DL
- Born: 26 August 1892; Milton Lilbourne, Wiltshire, England
- Died: 20 September 1966 (aged 74); Upton Lovell, Warminster, Wiltshire, England
- Military career
- Allegiance: United Kingdom
- Branch: British Army
- Service years: 1912–1950
- Rank: Brigadier
- Service number: 4968
- Units: 2nd Dragoon Guards (Queen's Bays); 9th Queen's Royal Lancers
- Commands: 9th Queen's Royal Lancers; 5th Cavalry Brigade; Army School of Equitation; 4th Cavalry Brigade; 30th Armoured Brigade
- Conflicts: World War I World War II
- Awards: Distinguished Service Order & Bar; Military Cross; Commander of the Order of the British Empire; Mentioned in dispatches (2)

Brigadier James Joseph Kingstone CBE DSO* MC DL (26 August 1892 – 20 September 1966) was an officer in the British Army during the First and Second World Wars.

== Military career ==
Kingstone was born in Milton Lilbourne, Wiltshire, England, on 26 August 1892, the son of William John Kingstone. He was educated at Sherborne School and then entered the Royal Military College, Sandhurst, from where he was commissioned as a second lieutenant into the 2nd Dragoon Guards (Queen's Bays) in 1912. His service number was 4968.

He was promoted to temporary lieutenant in the 2nd Dragoon Guards on 15 November 1914. He was appointed adjutant in his regiment on 1 May 1915 and was mentioned in dispatches on 30 November 1915. He was awarded the Military Cross (MC) on 11 January 1916 and promoted to lieutenant on 21 January 1916. On 6 July 1917, as a captain, he was awarded the Distinguished Service Order for action in Flanders. He was also twice mentioned in dispatches during the First World War. He was awarded a medal bar to his Distinguished Service Order in 1919.

He moved with the Queens Bays to India in 1922 and then appointed staff officer grade three. From April 1924 until August 1928 he returned to Sandhurst, this time as an Officer Commanding a Company of Gentlemen Cadets.

In 1932 he was promoted to lieutenant colonel and appointed commanding officer of the 9th Queen's Royal Lancers and in 1936, having been promoted to colonel, he was given command of the 5th Cavalry Brigade.

In 1938 as a temporary brigadier he was appointed Commandant of the Army School of Equitation, Weedon. He became commander of 4th Cavalry Brigade in 1939 and was deployed to the Middle East. He was briefly acting General Officer Commanding, 1st Cavalry Division in the Middle East in 1940 and then returned to the command of the 4th Cavalry Brigade in the Middle East later that year. He then briefly commanded 1st Cavalry Division again in 1941 before returning to the command of the 4th Cavalry Brigade.

During the Anglo-Iraqi War in May 1941, Kingstone was under the command of Major General J. G. W. Clark and was part of his relieving Habforce which included the 4th Cavalry Brigade, a battalion of The Essex Regiment, the Arab Legion Mechanised Regiment, a field artillery battery and a troop of anti-tank guns. Kingstone commanded a flying column named Kingcol in his honor. Habforce and Kingcol, parts of Iraqforce, attacked from the British Mandate of Palestine to relieve the forces defending RAF Habbaniya. Kingstone was again under Clark's command during the Syria-Lebanon Campaign in June 1941. He returned to the UK and became commander of 30th Armoured Brigade later in 1941 retaining the role until 1942.

== See also ==
- Iraqforce

== Bibliography ==
- Joslen, Lt-Col H.F. (1990) [1st. Pub. HMSO:1960]. Orders of Battle, Second World War, 1939–1945. London: London Stamp Exchange. ISBN 0-948130-03-2.

Honorary titles
Preceded by Sir Wentworth Harman	Colonel of the 2nd Dragoon Guards (Queen's Bays); 1945–1959	Succeeded by George Draffen
