= 1st The Queen's Dragoon Guards =

Regiment of the British Army

- Badge of the regiment
- Active: Since 1 January 1959
- Allegiance: United Kingdom
- Branch: British Army
- Type: Dragoon Guards
- Role: Light cavalry
- Size: Regiment ~403 personnel
- Part of: Royal Armoured Corps
- Garrison/HQ: RHQ – Cardiff; Regiment – Swanton Morley
- Nickname: The Welsh Cavalry
- Mottos: Pro rege et patria (For King and Country) (Latin)
- March: Quick – The Radetzky March and Rusty Buckles; Slow – 1st Dragoon Guards and 2nd Dragoon Guards Slow March
- Mascot: Welsh pony (Emrys Forlan Jones)
- Engagements: Combined battle honours of 1st King's Dragoon Guards, and 2nd Dragoon Guards (Queen's Bays); Wadi al-Batin 1991

Commanders
- Colonel-in-Chief: Catherine, Princess of Wales
- Regimental Colonel: Brigadier Alan Richmond
- Commanding Officer: Lieutenant-Colonel David G. A. Landon

Insignia
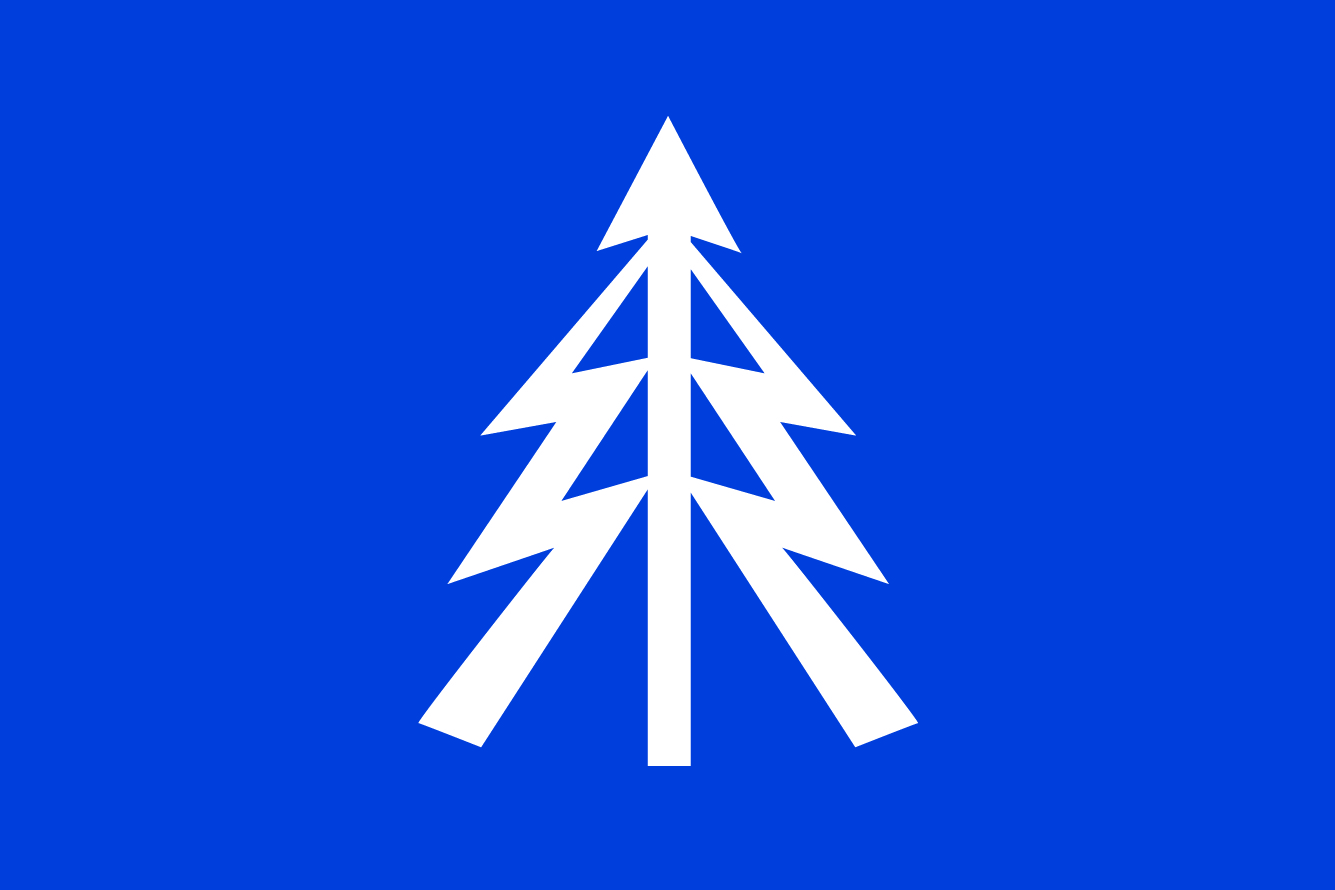
- Tactical recognition flash
- Arm badge: Royal Cypher of Queen Caroline; From the Queen's Bays (2nd Dragoon Guards)
- Abbreviation: QDG

1st The Queen's Dragoon Guards (QDG) is an armoured cavalry regiment in the Royal Armoured Corps (RAC) of the British Army that specialised in armoured reconnaissance, combined arms, counterinsurgency in desert terrain, counter-sniper tactics and special reconnaissance (snipers units only), desert warfare, ISTAR, manoeuvre warfare, and support to providing security in areas at risk of attack or terrorism.

Nicknamed The Welsh Cavalry, the regiment recruits from Wales and the bordering English counties of Cheshire, Herefordshire, Shropshire, and Worcestershire. It is the senior RAC cavalry regiment and therefore senior regiment of the line of the British Army.

== History ==
The current regiment was formed in 1959 by the amalgamation of 1st King's Dragoon Guards (raised in 1685 by Sir John Lanier as Lanier's or the 2nd Queen's Regiment of Horse in response to the Monmouth Rebellion) and the 2nd Dragoon Guards (Queen's Bays) (raised in 1685 by the Earl of Peterborough as Peterborough's or the 3rd Regiment of Horse, also in response to the Monmouth Rebellion).

The regiment has spent much of its short history based in Germany. It served during the Aden Emergency in 1966 and 1967 and its squadrons were dispersed throughout the Middle East during that time. Perhaps the best known member in the 1970s was Captain Mark Phillips, one-time husband of The Princess Anne: they married in 1973.

In 1983, the regiment was deployed to Lebanon in support of the allied Multinational Force, in 1990 it was sent to the Middle East for the Gulf War, and in 1996 it was deployed to Bosnia as part of NATO peacekeeping forces during the Yugoslav Wars.

In 2003, the regiment served during the invasion of Iraq providing the armoured reconnaissance and light armour support necessary to allow 3 Commando Brigade's advance north to Basra. On their return from Iraq in 2005, Brigadier Rose of 3 Commando Brigade presented the Regiment with the Commando Dagger in recognition of the superb relationship between 'C' Squadron and the Royal Marines during the liberation of Iraq. This squadron had the distinction of spending one of the longest periods of constant contact with the enemy for 20 days or so during this operation. In 2004, the QDG returned to Iraq on Op TELIC 5 in the counter insurgency role with B Squadron deploying from Basra in support of 1st Battalion, The Black Watch in support of operations around Fallujah.

After operations in Basra and Maysan, the Regiment then took command of Al Muthanna Province as a Task Force of over 1000 personnel. In 2006, the QDG returned to Iraq on Operation Telic 8 and oversaw the successful transfer of Al Muthanna province back to Iraqi control.

At the end of 2007, the Regiment left Osnabrück and moved to Dempsey Barracks, Sennelager, where they trained for a six-month deployment to Afghanistan as part of 3 Commando Brigade. Here, they carried out a variety of frontline tasks across Helmand Province. QDG were the first Formation Reconnaissance Regiment to deploy to Helmand as the Intelligence, Surveillance and Target Acquisition Group (ISTAR Gp) on Operation Herrick 15 in 2011. The ISTAR Gp consisted of HQ Squadron, 'C' Squadron, 'D' Squadron QRH, an Intelligence Company, K Battery 5 Regt RA and 11 UAV Battery with 'B' Squadron initially detached to the Danish Battlegroup but joining the remainder of the Regiment towards the end of the tour.

The regiment celebrated its fiftieth anniversary on 31 July 2009 with a ceremony at Cardiff Castle and a parade through the streets of Cardiff city, both attended by the Colonel-in-Chief, the Prince of Wales (now Charles III). The regiment received a great response from the people of Cardiff. That same year, the unit was also awarded with the Freedom of the City of Swansea.

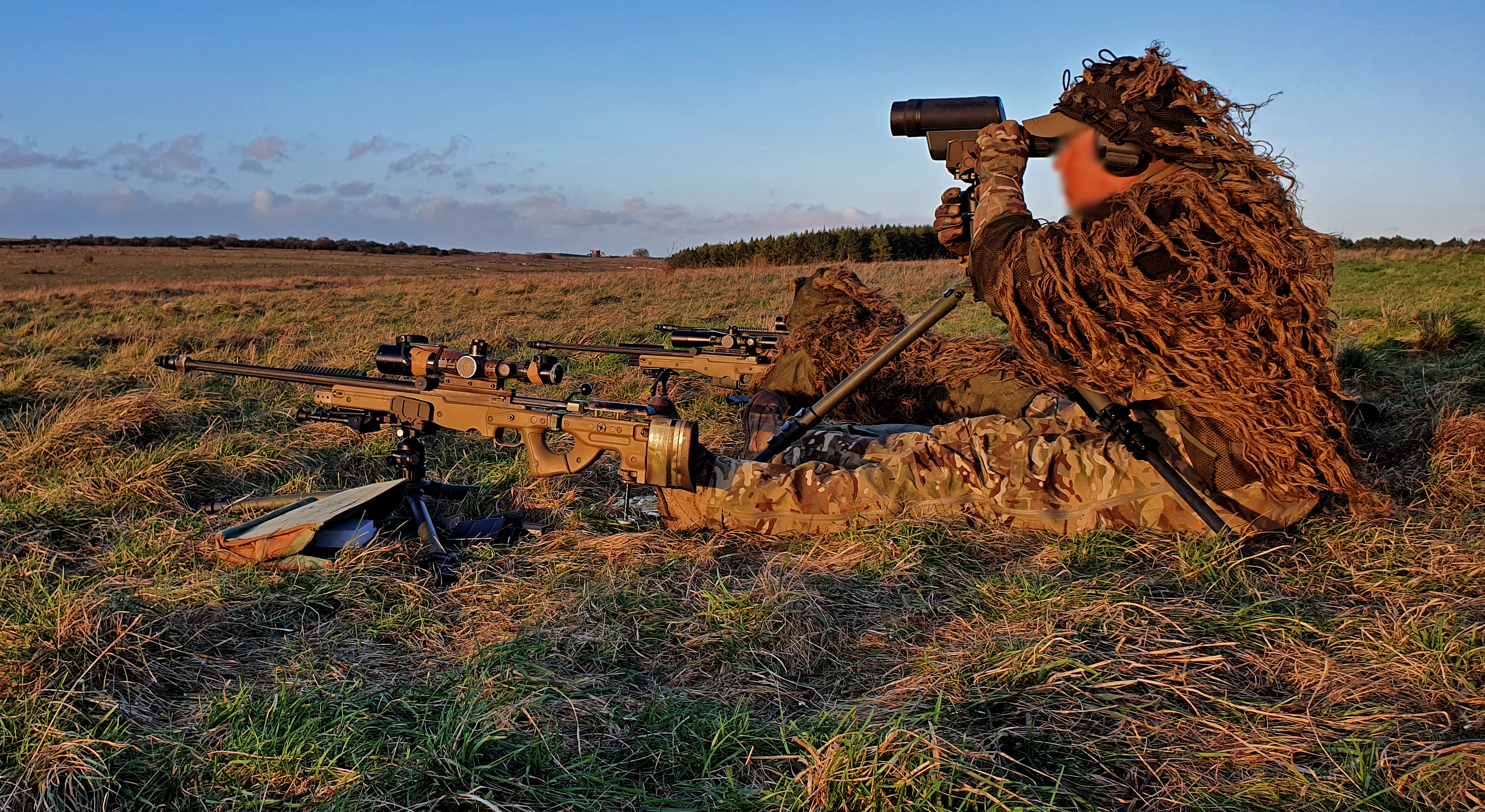
Snipers training while on exercise

In 2012, the regiment were called in to provide security for the 2012 London Olympics with composite squadrons focused on supporting the beach volleyball and securing the athletes village. In May of that year, there was speculation that the unit would become a victim of the defence budget cuts. As it was one of only three regiments historically associated with and one that still largely recruits from Wales, there was much support from the Welsh public to keep the QDG. However, Ministry of Defence officials announced no such plan has been made.

As part of the Army 2020 plans, most units based in Germany returned to the UK and the QDG moved to Robertson Barracks, Swanton Morley, Norfolk, in June 2015. They re-roled as "light cavalry", using Jackal vehicles.

In 2014, the Regiment deployed on the final British combat deployment to Helmand Province on Operation HERRICK 20. Battlegroup Headquarters worked alongside the senior leadership of 3/215 Brigade of the Afghan Army. 'A' Squadron worked with the Afghan Army to develop the latter's capabilities and professionalism in a training capacity. 'B' Squadron formed the Afghan National Security Forces Liaison Team, patrolling to the forward operating bases across the southern part of the province. 'C' Squadron formed the Brigade Reconnaissance Force.

In 2018, the QDG conducted two tours of Poland on Operation Cabrit providing the role for NATO as the enhanced forward presence in order to protect and reassure NATO's Central and Northern European member states on NATO's eastern flank of their security.

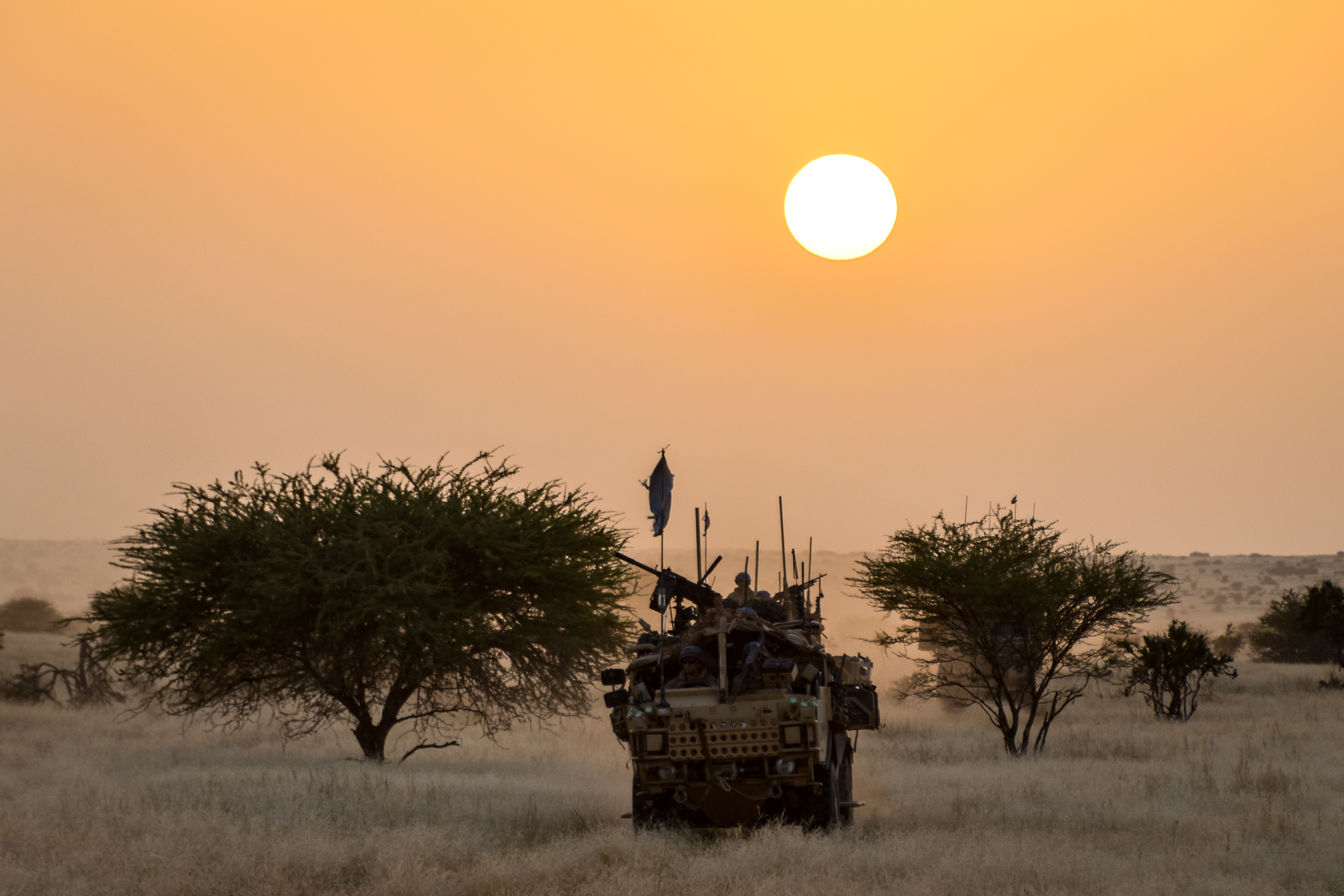
QDG operating in Mali

In June 2021 'C' Squadron, 1st The Queen's Dragoon Guards deployed to Mali with 2nd Battalion The Royal Anglian Regiment to form the Long Range Reconnaissance Group for Op Newcombe rotation 2 for 6 months. Op Newcombe was a peacekeeping operation in support of the United Nations Multidimensional Integrated Stabilisation Mission in Mali (MINUSMA). Whilst deployed C squadron assisted in facilitating war crime investigations and also came under fire for the first time since combat operations in Afghanistan 2014 where the welsh cavalry were also at the time. A member of C squadron QDG earned a mention in dispatches while deployed for courageous actions in the face of the enemy.

In December 2021, the regimental headquarters and 'A' squadron, 1st The Queen's Dragoon Guards, with support from a company from the Royal Irish Regiment, took over from 'C' squadron to start a further 6 months tour of Mali.

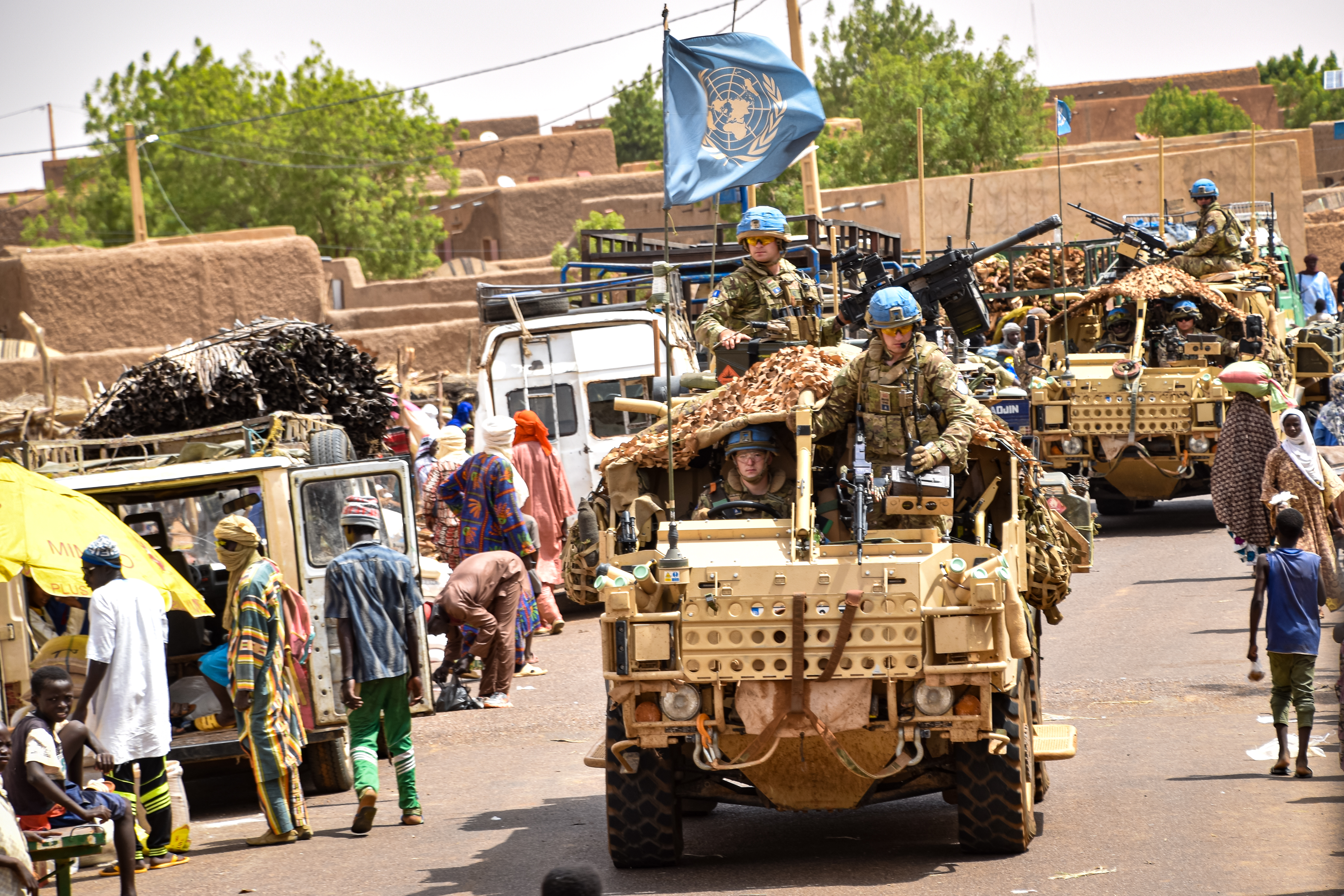
QDG driving through village in Mali

In July 2022, once all squadrons were back from Op Newcombe in Mali, the regiment as a whole took part in freedom parades in Wales, most notably in Cardiff where King Charles III (then Prince Charles) was in attendance. The regiment then went onto parade in Wrexham, Swansea, and Newport.

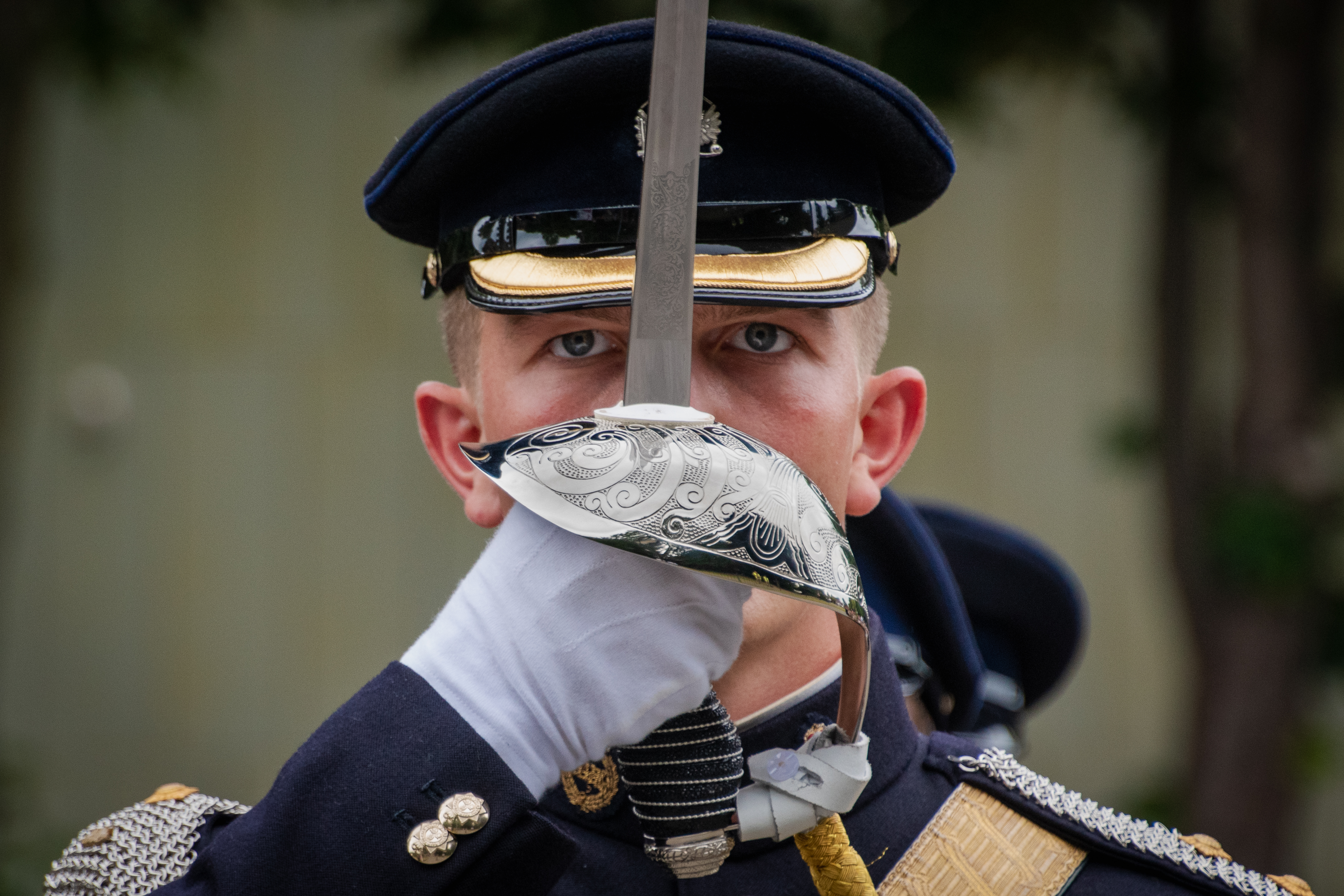
QDG Officer on parade

As part of the Future Soldier programme, the regiment will remain in their armoured cavalry role but move to Caerwent 'not before' 2027.

== Operational role ==
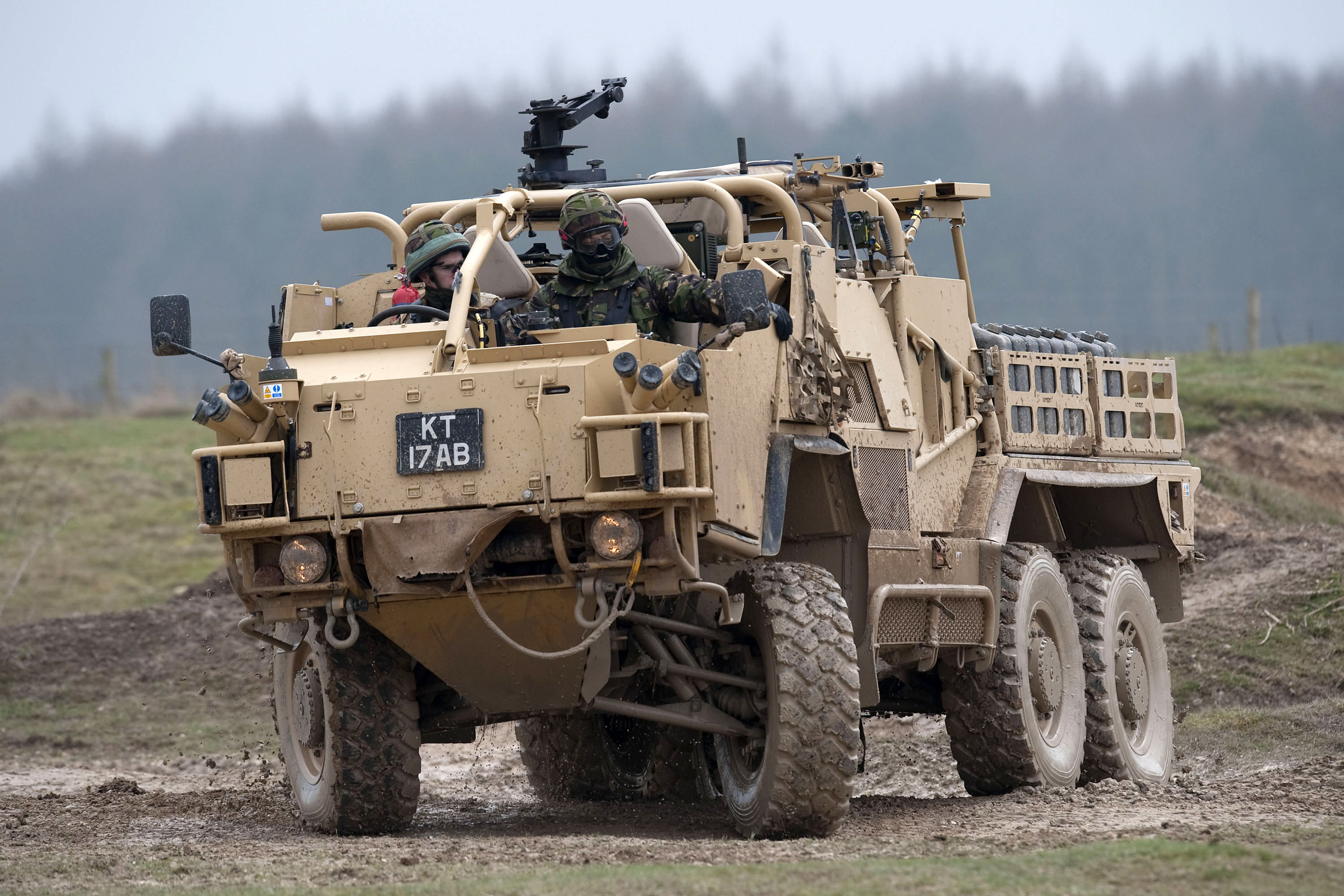
Members of 1st The Queen's Dragoon Guards under training to operate the Coyote vehicle

The regiment's role is reconnaissance using the Jackal 2 and Coyote high mobility vehicles.

== Regimental museum ==
The regimental collection is displayed at Firing Line: Cardiff Castle Museum of the Welsh Soldier in Cardiff.

== Uniform, cap badge and march ==
In 1896, Austria-Hungarian Emperor Franz Joseph I was appointed Colonel-in-Chief of the 1st King's Dragoon Guards and allowed the regiment to wear the imperial Coat of arms of Austria-Hungary, which is still used as the regiment's cap badge today; the collar badge is that of The Queen's Bays. Also the regiment adopted an Austrian military march, Radetzky March, as quick march. The current Regimental March is the Radetzky March and Rusty Buckles, the latter being the Regimental March of The Queen's Bays. Other items of uniform draw on the regiment's dual heritage: thus, whilst the cap of 1st King's Dragoon Guards (with dark blue velvet strip and piping) is worn, trousers have the distinctive broad white stripe of The Queen's Bays.

Full dress is still worn by some on ceremonial occasions: the 1st King's Dragoon Guards tunic (scarlet with blue velvet facings) being paired with Queen's Bays white-striped overalls. The KDG red-plumed brass cavalry helmet is also worn, together with pouch belts and other accoutrements.

In the QDG, lance corporals wear two chevrons, corporals wear two chevrons surmounted by the Bay's emblem, which is worn by all senior NCOs. Squadron Quartermaster Sergeants wear four chevrons surmounted by a crown.

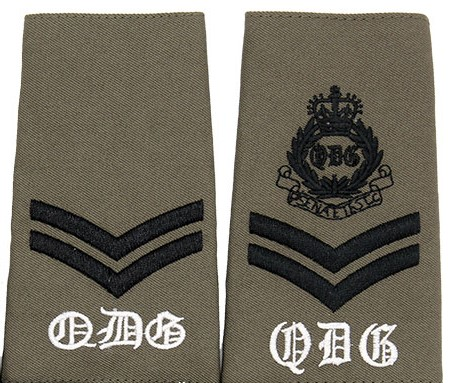
LCpl and Cpl rank slides

== Battle honours ==
- Combined battle honours of 1st King's Dragoon Guards, and 2nd Dragoon Guards (Queen's Bays), plus:
- Wadi al-Batin, Gulf 1991, Iraq 2003

== Commanding officers ==
The Commanding Officers have been:

- 1959–1960: Lt.-Col. H. C. Selby
- 1960–1962: Lt.-Col. Jack W. Harman
- 1962–1964: Lt.-Col. Peter R. Body
- 1964–1967: Lt.-Col. Thomas W. Muir
- 1967–1969: Lt.-Col. George N. Powell
- 1969–1971: Lt.-Col. John H. Lidsey
- 1971–1973: Lt.-Col. Maurice R. Johnston
- 1973–1975: Lt.-Col. Robin C. Middleton
- 1975–1977: Lt.-Col. Robert W. Ward
- 1977–1980: Lt.-Col. John I. Pocock
- 1980–1982: Lt.-Col. Charles H. Bond
- 1982–1985: Lt.-Col. J. Gordon G. de P. Ferguson
- 1985–1987: Lt.-Col. Eric J. K. O’Brien
- 1987–1990: Lt.-Col. Michael G. Boissard
- 1990–1992: Lt.-Col. Christopher Mackenzie-Beevor
- 1992–1994: Lt.-Col. Mark R. M. Eliot
- 1994–1997: Lt.-Col. Hamish L. A. Macdonald
- 1997–1999: Lt.-Col. Simon V. Mayall
- 1999–2001: Lt.-Col. Patrick J. Andrews
- 2001–2003: Lt.-Col. Gilbert T. Baldwin
- 2003–2005: Lt.-Col. Timothy R. Wilson
- 2005–2007: Lt.-Col. Anthony J. Pittman
- 2007–2010: Lt.-Col. Alan S. Richmond
- 2010–2012: Lt.-Col. Jasper J. De Quincey Adams
- 2012–2015: Lt.-Col. William H. L. Davies
- 2015–2017: Lt.-Col. Daniel B. Duff
- 2017–2019: Lt.-Col. Justin G. E. Stenhouse
- 2019–2022: Lt.-Col. Hugo T. Lloyd
- 2022–2024: Lt.-Col. Christopher S. Kierstead
- Since 2024: Lt -Col. David G. A. Landon

== Colonels-in-chief ==
Colonels-in-chief were as follows:

- 1959–2002: Queen Elizabeth the Queen Mother
- 2003–2023: King Charles III
- 2023–present: Catherine, Princess of Wales

== Regimental colonels ==
Regimental colonels were as follows:

- 1959–1961: Brig. John Gerard Edward Tiarks
- 1961–1964: Col. George William Charles Draffen DSO
- 1964–1968: Col. Kenneth Edward Savill DSO DL
- 1968–1975: Brig. Anthony William Allen Llewellyn-Palmer DSO
- 1975–1980: Gen. Sir Jack Wentworth Harman GCB OBE MC ADCGen
- 1980–1986: Maj. Gen. Desmond Hind Garrett Rice CVO CBE
- 1986–1991: Lt Gen. Sir Maurice Robert Johnston KCB OBE
- 1991–1997: Maj. Gen. Robert William Ward CB MBE
- 1997–2002: Col. John Ievers Pocock MBE
- 2002–2007: Col. Christopher MacKenzie-Beevor CBE
- 2007–2019: Lt Gen. Sir Simon Mayall KBE CB
- Since 2019: Brig. Alan Richmond OBE

== Alliances ==
Royal Navy

- HMS Monmouth

Affiliated Regiment

- The Royal Mercian and Lancastrian Yeomanry

Allied Royal Air Force Squadron

- IV Squadron RAF

Affiliation

- The Worshipful Company of Leathersellers

Commonwealth

- Canada – The Governor General's Horse Guards
- Australia – 1st/15th Royal New South Wales Lancers
- South Africa – 1 Special Service Battalion
- Pakistan – 11th Cavalry (Frontier Force)
- Sri Lanka – 1st Reconnaissance Regiment

Non-Commonwealth

- Austria – Panzergrenadierbataillon 35
- France – 1er Régiment Étranger de Cavalerie (Twinned Regiment)

== Order of precedence ==
Preceded by The Blues and Royals (Royal Horse Guards and 1st Dragoons)	Cavalry Order of Precedence	Succeeded by The Royal Scots Dragoon Guards (Carabiniers and Greys)
