= Felix Ready =

British Army general (1872–1940)

General Sir Felix Ready GBE KCB CSI CMG DSO
- Born: 16 July 1872; Ballasalla, Isle of Man
- Died: 6 April 1940 (aged 67); London, England
- Military career
- Allegiance: United Kingdom
- Branch: British Army
- Service years: 1891–1935
- Rank: General
- Commands: 1st Division; Northern Ireland District
- Conflicts: Second Boer War; First World War
- Awards: Knight Grand Cross of the Order of the British Empire; Knight Commander of the Order of the Bath; Companion of the Order of the Star of India; Companion of the Order of St Michael and St George; Distinguished Service Order

General Sir Felix Fordati Ready (16 July 1872 – 6 April 1940) was a British Army officer who served as Quartermaster-General to the Forces from 1931 to 1935. He was considered an expert in military tactics.

== Military career ==
Ready was the son of Colonel John Tobin Ready and the grandson of John Ready, former Lieutenant Governor of the Isle of Man. Educated at Wellington College, Ready was commissioned into the Royal Berkshire Regiment as a second lieutenant on 5 December 1891. He was promoted to lieutenant on 28 July 1894, and was part of the Kitchener Expedition to defeat the Mahdi in Sudan in 1898–99, taking part in the battles of Atbara (April 1898) and Omdurman (September 1898). He attended the Staff College, Camberley, from 1898 to 1899.

With the 2nd Battalion of his regiment, Ready served in South Africa during the Second Boer War of 1899–1900, taking part in operations in the Orange Free State from February to July 1900 and Transvaal from July to November 1900. He returned to South Africa in 1902, as the war drew to a close, and was promoted to captain on 15 January 1902. For his service in the war he was mentioned in despatches, was awarded the Distinguished Service Order and received the Queen's South Africa Medal with three clasps.

After the end of the war in May 1902, Ready and the rest of the 2nd Battalion was sent to Egypt, where they arrived on the SS Dominion in November 1902.

He was promoted from supernumerary lieutenant captain to captain on 29 August 1908.

On 1 August 1910 he was assigned as a commander of a company of gentlemen cadets at the Royal Military College, Sandhurst. He was promoted to major on 29 July 1911.

Ready served in the First World War, becoming in August 1914 a deputy assistant adjutant and quartermaster general and in June 1915 an assistant adjutant and quartermaster general and for which he was promoted to the temporary rank of lieutenant colonel while holding his appointment, He was later an adjutant general in Mesopotamia. In January 1917 he was promoted to brevet colonel and in October was made a temporary major general while employed as a deputy adjutant general.

His major general's rank became substantive in June 1919. He was appointed General Officer Commanding Northern Ireland District in 1926 before becoming General Officer Commanding 1st Division at Aldershot in 1929.

After being promoted to lieutenant general in August 1930, and after vacating command of the 1st Division on 9 November 1930, he became Quartermaster-General to the Forces in 1931. He was made a general on 16 July 1934, and, after relinquishing this assignment, retired from the army on 2 February 1935.

== Personal life ==
In 1900, Ready married Marguerite Violet Daisy Cotterill. He died at his home in Kensington, London, on 6 April 1940, aged 67.

Military offices
Preceded by Sir Archibald Cameron	General Officer Commanding the British Army in Northern Ireland; 1926–1929	Succeeded by Sir Arthur Wauchope
Preceded by John Duncan	General Officer Commanding the 1st Division; 1929–1930	Succeeded by Wentworth Harman
Preceded by Sir Hastings Anderson	Quartermaster-General to the Forces; 1931–1934	Succeeded by Sir Reginald May
