= Humble Duty =

Irish-bred Thoroughbred racehorse

- Sire: Sovereign Path
- Grandsire: Grey Sovereign
- Dam: Flattering
- Damsire: Abernant
- Sex: Mare
- Foaled: 28 April 1967
- Country: Ireland
- Colour: Grey
- Breeder: Frank Tuthill
- Owner: Jean, Lady Ashcombe
- Trainer: Peter Walwyn
- Record: 11: 8-1-1
- Earnings: £63,896

Major wins
- Lowther Stakes (1969); Cheveley Park Stakes (1969); 1000 Guineas (1970); Coronation Stakes (1970); Sussex Stakes (1970); Wills Mile (1970)

Honours
- Top-rated British two-year-old filly (1969); Timeform rating: 127

Humble Duty (1967–1975) was an Irish-bred, British-trained Thoroughbred racehorse. In a racing career lasting from May 1969 until September 1970, the filly ran eleven times and won eight races. As a two-year-old she was rated the best of her age and sex in Britain after winning the Lowther Stakes at York and the Cheveley Park Stakes at Newmarket. In the following season she won five races, all over one mile, including the 1000 Guineas at Newmarket, the Coronation Stakes at Royal Ascot and the Sussex Stakes at Goodwood. She was retired to stud at the end of that season, but had little chance to make an impact as a broodmare, dying in 1975 at the age of eight.

== Background ==
Humble Duty was a grey filly bred at the Owenstown Stud at Maynooth in County Kildare, Ireland by Frank Tuthill. Her sire Sovereign Path, from whom she inherited her colour, was a top class miler who won the Lockinge Stakes and the Queen Elizabeth II Stakes. Humble Duty's dam, Flattering was placed in the Cheveley Park Stakes and was out of Flatter, a moderate race mare but a half-sister to The Derby runner-up Gay Time.

As a yearling, Humble Duty was sent to the Newmarket sales where she was bought for 17,000 guineas by the British Bloodstock Agency, acting on behalf of Jean, Lady Ashcombe, the widow of Roland Cubitt, 3rd Baron Ashcombe. Humble Duty was sent into training with Peter Walwyn at his Seven Barrows stable at Lambourn.

== Racing career ==
=== 1969: two-year-old season ===
Humble Duty's first appearance on a racecourse came in May 1969 when she won the Ann Boleyn Stakes over five furlongs at Sandown Park. Although the winning margin was only a length and the opposition moderate, Humble Duty was immediately moved up in class to contest the Queen Mary Stakes at Royal Ascot. She led for most of the race before being overtaken a furlong from the finish and took third place behind Farfalla. After a break of two months, during which she was affected by a cough, she returned in the Lowther Stakes at York in August in which she was matched against Mange Tout, a filly who had won the Prix d'Arenberg and the Molecomb Stakes. Humble Duty won by three quarters of a length from Pisces, with Mange Tout in third. Her final appearance of the year came in the Cheveley Park Stakes at Newmarket in October. Humble Duty led from the start and won by 2 1/2 lengths from Farfalla and Black Satin.

In the Free Handicap, a ranking of the best two-year-olds to have run in Britain in 1969, Humble Duty was the top-rated filly, seven pounds below the leading colt Nijinsky. She was also made the ante-post favourite for the following year's 1000 Guineas.

=== 1970: three-year-old season ===
On her first appearance of 1970, Humble Duty ran at Newbury in the Fred Darling Stakes, a trial race for the 1000 Guineas. She appeared less than fully fit and was given a very gentle race by her jockey Lester Piggott in finishing second to Highest Hopes. In the 1000 Guineas two weeks later, Humble Duty started 3/1 joint-favourite in a field of twelve runners. Ridden by Piggott Humble Duty took the lead inside the final quarter mile and drew well clear of her opponents. She won very easily by seven lengths from Gleam, with Black Satin two lengths further back in third and Highest Hopes unplaced. The winning margin was the widest in the race in the 20th century.

Humble Duty was sent to Epsom in June, but bypassed the one and a half mile Oaks, running instead in the Ebbisham Stakes over 8 1/2 furlongs and winning by four lengths. At Royal Ascot in June, Humble Duty started at odds of 1/6 in the Coronation Stakes and won very easily from Black Satin, who had won the Irish 1000 Guineas since her defeat at Newmarket. Having beaten the best of her own age and sex, the filly was then tried against colts and older horses in the Sussex Stakes at Goodwood in July. Ridden by Duncan Keith, Humble Duty won decisively by three-quarters of a length from Gold Rod, Joshua and Welsh Pageant. In August, Humble Duty added another major victory over Goodwood's mile course when she won the Wills Mile by a length from Prince de Galles (Cambridgeshire Handicap) and Yellow God (runner-up to Nijinsky in the 2000 Guineas).

In her final race, Humble Duty failed to reproduce her best form, finishing fourth behind Welsh Pageant, Gold Rod and Prince de Galles in the Queen Elizabeth II Stakes at Ascot in September.

== Retirement ==
Humble Duty's breeding career was brief and disappointing. She produced two known foals, neither of whom proved to be of any use as racehorses. In 1974 she miscarried a foal sired by Mill Reef. Humble Duty died in 1975 at the age of eight.

== Assessment and honours ==
In their book, A Century of Champions, based on the Timeform rating system, John Randall and Tony Morris rated Humble Duty a "superior" winner of the 1000 Guineas and the forty-seventh best filly trained in Britain or Ireland in the 20th century.

Humble Duty was given a rating of 127 by Timeform in 1970.

== Pedigree ==
Pedigree of Humble Duty (IRE), grey mare, 1967
Sire Sovereign Path (GB) 1956	Grey Sovereign (GB); 1948	Nasrullah	Nearco
Sire Sovereign Path (GB) 1956	Grey Sovereign (GB); 1948	Nasrullah	Mumtaz Begum
Sire Sovereign Path (GB) 1956	Grey Sovereign (GB); 1948	Kong	Baytown
Sire Sovereign Path (GB) 1956	Grey Sovereign (GB); 1948	Kong	Clang
Sire Sovereign Path (GB) 1956	Mountain Path (GB); 1948	Bobsleigh	Gainsborough
Sire Sovereign Path (GB) 1956	Mountain Path (GB); 1948	Bobsleigh	Toboggan
Sire Sovereign Path (GB) 1956	Mountain Path (GB); 1948	Path of Peace	Winalot
Sire Sovereign Path (GB) 1956	Mountain Path (GB); 1948	Path of Peace	Grand Peace
Dam Flattering (GB) 1961	Abernant (GB); 1946	Owen Tudor	Hyperion
Dam Flattering (GB) 1961	Abernant (GB); 1946	Owen Tudor	Mary Tudor
Dam Flattering (GB) 1961	Abernant (GB); 1946	Rustom Mahal	Rustom Pasha
Dam Flattering (GB) 1961	Abernant (GB); 1946	Rustom Mahal	Mumtaz Mahal
Dam Flattering (GB) 1961	Flatter (GB); 1947	Rockefella	Hyperion
Dam Flattering (GB) 1961	Flatter (GB); 1947	Rockefella	Rockfel
Dam Flattering (GB) 1961	Flatter (GB); 1947	Daring Miss	Felicitation
Dam Flattering (GB) 1961	Flatter (GB); 1947	Daring Miss	Venturesome (Family 21-a)
