= George Draffen =

- Born: 12 May 1899
- Died: 17 February 1986 (aged 86)
- Military career
- Allegiance: United Kingdom
- Branch: British Army
- Rank: Brigadier
- Conflicts: Second World War
- Awards: Distinguished Service Order

Brigadier George William Charles Draffen DSO (12 May 1899 – 17 February 1986) was a British Army officer who saw action during the Second World War.

== Military career ==
Draffen was confirmed as a lieutenant in the 2nd Dragoon Guards (Queen's Bays) on 20 December 1920. He became the commanding officer of his regiment in 1940 and went on to be commander of 26th Armoured Brigade in 1943 during the North African campaign of the Second World War. He served as colonel of the 2nd Dragoon Guards (Queen's Bays) from 1954 to 1959 when the regiment amalgamated with the 1st King's Dragoon Guards to form the 1st The Queen's Dragoon Guards, he then served as colonel of that regiment from 1961 to 1964.

Military offices
Preceded by James Kingstone	Colonel of the 2nd Dragoon Guards (Queen's Bays); 1954–1959	Succeeded by Regiment Amalgamated
