= Charles Walwyn =

Lieutenant-Colonel Charles Lawrence Tyndall "Taffy" Walwyn DSO OBE MC (1883–1959) was a British Army officer of the First World War who received the Military Cross. His son was the race horse trainer Peter Walwyn.

Walwyn was commissioned into the Royal Carmarthen Artillery Militia in June 1901, and transferred to the regular army as a second lieutenant in the Royal Artillery on 24 December 1902.

In 1922, he was appointed as the first commandant of the new Army School of Equitation.
