= Wentworth Harman =

British army general (1872–1961)

Lieutenant-General Sir Wentworth Harman KCB DSO
- Born: 21 April 1872; Carrigaline, County Cork, Ireland
- Died: 26 September 1961 (aged 89); Poole, Dorset, England
- Relatives: General Sir Jack Harman (son)
- Military career
- Allegiance: United Kingdom
- Branch: British Army
- Service years: 1891–1934
- Rank: Lieutenant-General
- Commands: 1st Division; Army School of Equitation; 1st Cavalry Brigade
- Conflicts: First World War
- Awards: Knight Commander of the Order of the Bath; Distinguished Service Order; Mentioned in Despatches

Lieutenant-General Sir Antony Ernest Wentworth Harman, KCB, DSO (21 April 1872 – 26 September 1961) was an Anglo-Irish British Army officer who commanded 1st Division from 1930 to 1934.

== Military career ==
Harman was commissioned into the Limerick City Artillery (Southern Division) in 1891. He transferred to the 3rd Dragoon Guards in January 1894, was promoted to captain on 1 April 1900, and seconded to serve with the Army Service Corps. In May 1902 he was temporary appointed a Staff captain.

Harman served in the First World War, joining the British Expeditionary Force and taking part in the action at Néry in 1914, before becoming commandant of the Cavalry School at Netheravon. He was promoted on 3 June 1918 to brevet colonel.

On 2 June 1919 he was promoted to substantive colonel.

He was appointed commander of the 1st Cavalry Brigade in 1920 and colonel in charge of administration at Northern Command in 1924. He relinquished this assignment, and the temporary rank of colonel on the staff that came with it, in August 1926 when he was made commandant of the Army School of Equitation as well as inspector of cavalry, taking over from Colonel George Weir and receiving promotion to temporary colonel commandant whilst so employed. In June 1928 his temporary colonel commandant's rank was replaced by that of temporary brigadier. In October he was promoted to substantive major general.

He went on to be general officer commanding (GOC) of the 1st Division at Aldershot in 1930. He gave up this appointment in April 1934 and retired from the army and was granted the rank of lieutenant general.

Harman was also colonel of the Queen's Bays (2nd Dragoon Guards).

He died at the age of 89 in 1961 and is buried at Marnhull Churchyard in Dorset.

== Family ==
In 1902 Harman married Dorothy Ricardo; they had two daughters and a son (General Sir Jack Harman).

Military offices
Preceded by Felix Ready	General Officer Commanding the 1st Division; 1930–1934	Succeeded by John Kennedy
Honorary titles
Preceded by Sir Hew Dalrymple Fanshawe	Colonel of the 2nd Dragoon Guards (Queen's Bays); 1930–1945	Succeeded by James Joseph Kingstone
