= 2nd Dragoon Guards (Queen's Bays) =

British Army cavalry regiment

2nd Dragoon Guards (The Queen's Bays)
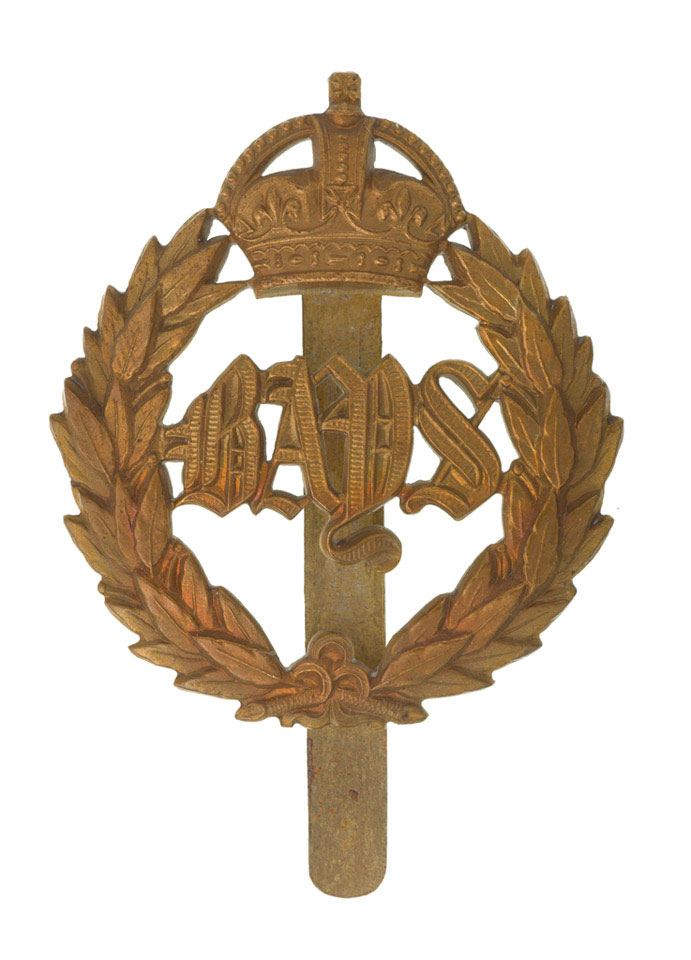
- The regimental cap badge for other ranks between 1920 and 1952
- Active: 1685–1959
- Allegiance: England (1685–1707); Great Britain (1707–1800); United Kingdom (1801–1959)
- Branch: English Army (1685–1707); British Army (1707–1959)
- Type: Dragoons; Armoured cavalry
- Role: Armoured reconnaissance Artillery observer Direct fire Manoeuvre warfare Patrolling
- Size: Regiment
- Part of: Royal Armoured Corps
- Nicknames: The Bays, Rusty Buckles
- Mottos: Pro rege et patria (Latin: "For King & Country")
- March: Quick – Rusty Buckles; Slow – The Queen's Bays

Commanders
- Ceremonial chief: Franz Joseph I of Austria

The 2nd Dragoon Guards (Queen's Bays) was a cavalry regiment of the British Army. It was first raised in 1685 by Henry Mordaunt, 2nd Earl of Peterborough as the Earl of Peterborough's Regiment of Horse by merging four existing cavalry troops. Renamed several times, the regiment was designated the Queen's Regiment of Dragoon Guards in 1746 as it evolved into a dragoon unit.

In 1767 the regiment was renamed the "2nd Dragoon Guards (Queen's Bays)" to reflect the custom of its officers and soldiers to ride only bay horses. The regiment served as horse cavalry until 1937, when it was mechanised with light tanks. The regiment became part of the Royal Armoured Corps in 1939. After service in the First and Second World Wars, the regiment was amalgamated with the 1st King's Dragoon Guards in 1959 to form the 1st The Queen's Dragoon Guards.

== History ==
=== Early history ===
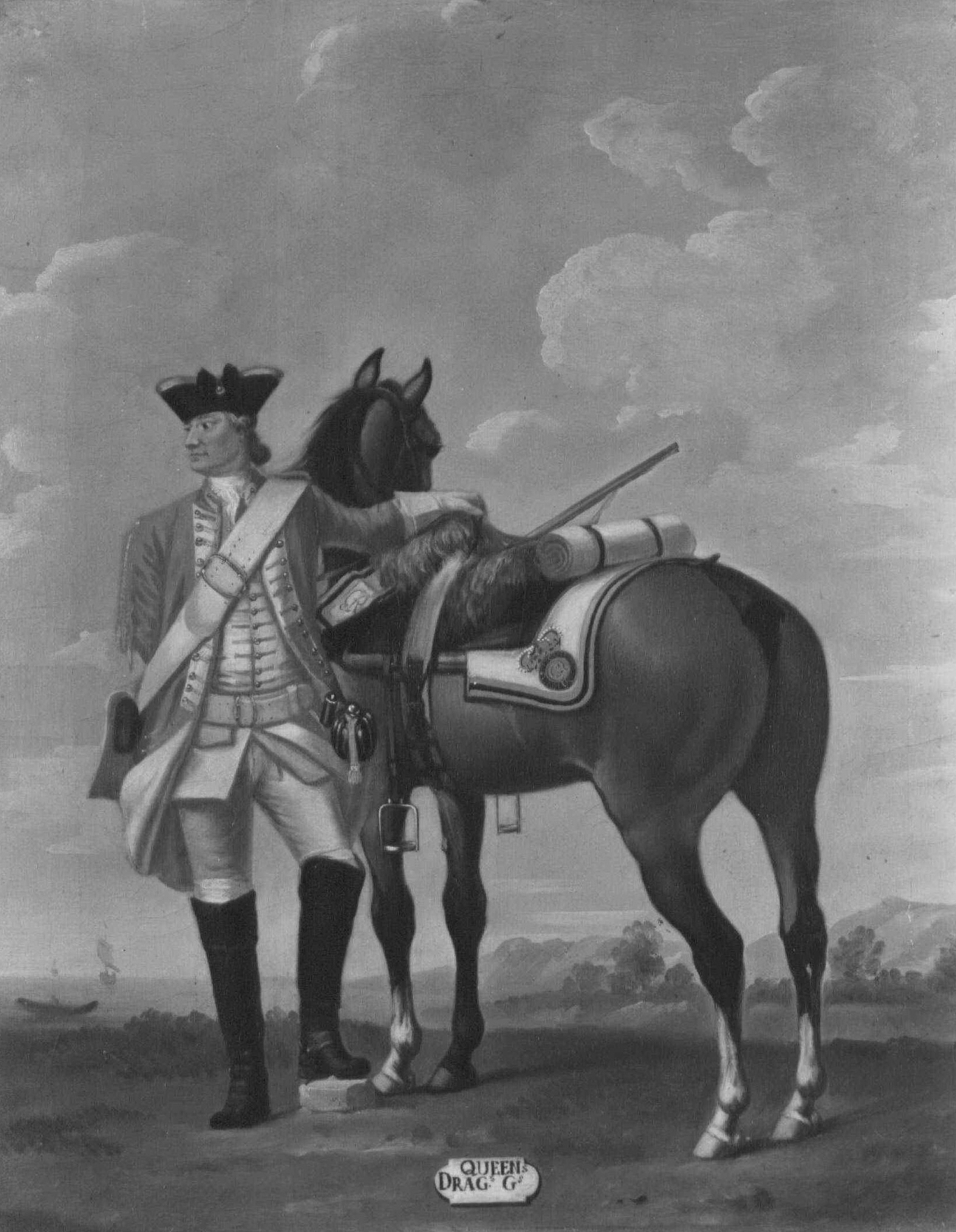
c. 1751 painting of a regimental private

The regiment was raised in 1685 as the Earl of Peterborough's Regiment of Horse when James II expanded his army after the Monmouth Rebellion. (Note: At this time, regiments were typically named after the Colonel and changed names when a new Colonel was appointed.) Peterborough was a Catholic who remained loyal to James and was replaced by Edward Villiers on 31 December 1688. (Note: Commissions were private assets that could be bought, sold or used as an investment; many Colonels played no active military role which seems likely with Villiers.)

During the Nine Years' War, it served as Villiers Regiment in Ireland between 1689 and 1691, fighting in the battles of the Boyne and Aughrim. (Note: Villiers died in July 1689 but this would not have impacted operational command, which appears to have exercised by Lt-Colonel George Carpenter.) At Aughrim, it was ordered to cross a bog under heavy fire, prompting French general the Marquis de St Ruth to shout "It is madness, but no matter, the more that cross the more we shall kill;" he was decapitated by a cannonball shortly thereafter. When the Treaty of Limerick ended the war in Ireland in October 1691, the regiment returned to England.

After Brigadier-General Richard Leveson became Colonel on 19 January 1694, it became Leveson's Regiment of Horse. It escaped disbandment by being placed on the Irish establishment; (Note: Until 1707, Scotland, England and Ireland were treated as separate kingdoms, which paid for their own military units.) Leveson died in March 1699 and Daniel Harvey took over as Colonel. During the War of the Spanish Succession Harveys Regiment moved to Portugal in March 1704 to support the Allied campaign in the Iberian Peninsula. In July 1710 it fought at the Battle of Almenar but in December was overwhelmed by superior forces at Brihuega, the survivors being taken prisoner.

In recognition of its involvement in suppressing the 1715 Jacobite rising it changed names to The Princess of Wales's Own Regiment of Horse and after Caroline of Wales became Queen in 1727 The Queen's Own Regiment of Horse. After the 1745 Jacobite rising it changed titles again to The Queen's Regiment of Dragoon Guards in 1746 then 2nd (The Queen's) Regiment of Dragoon Guards in 1751. During the Seven Years' War, it fought at Corbach and Warburg in July 1760 and then captured several French regiments at the Battle of Wilhelmsthal in June 1762. After starting to ride on bay horses, the regiment were renamed as the 2nd Dragoon Guards (Queen's Bays) in 1767.

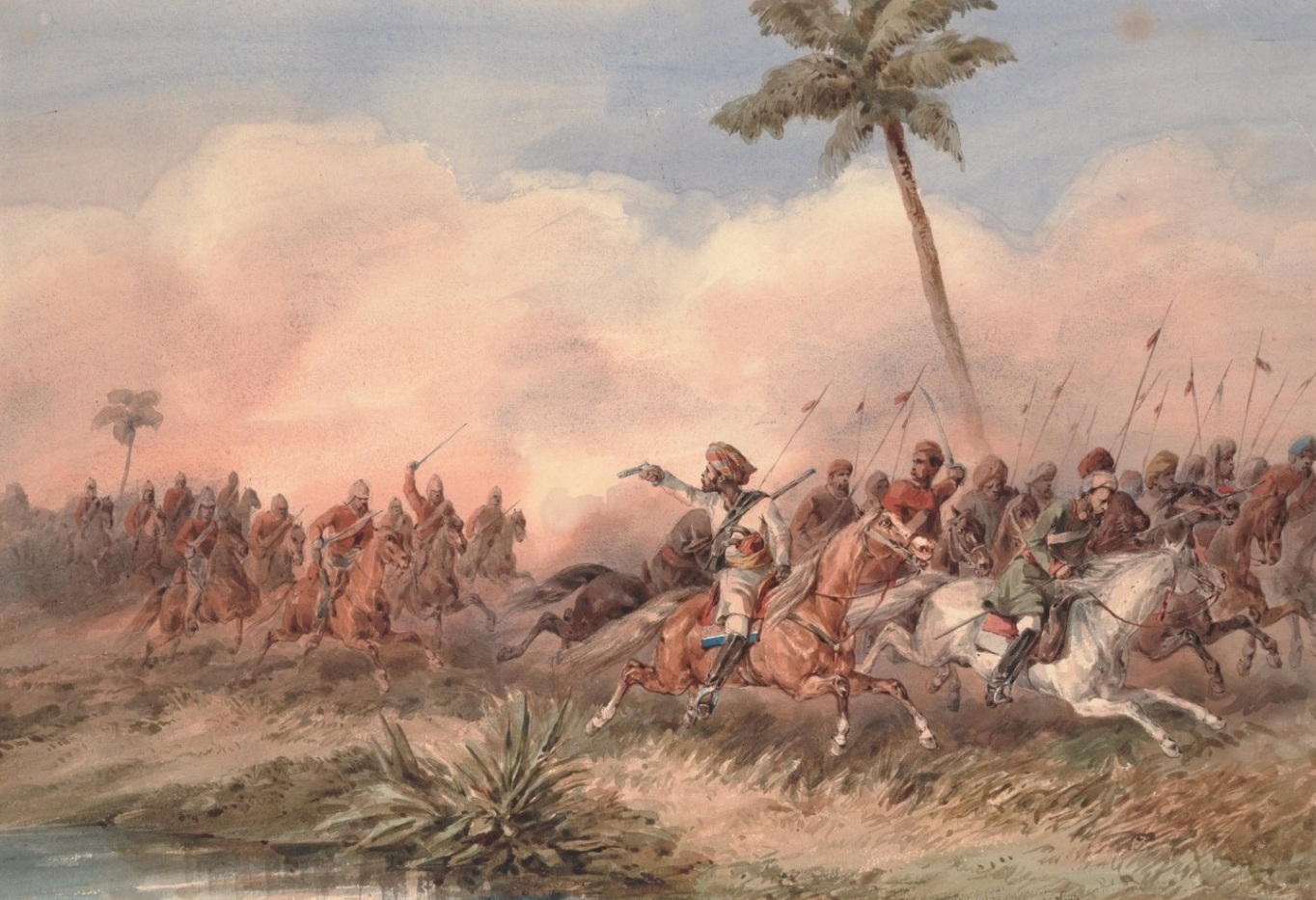
The regiment (left) routing Indian mutineers near Hyderabad during the Indian Rebellion of 1857

In an incident at Lezennes, a single squadron of the regiment, under Major Robert Craufurd, attacked and defeated a unit of 150 French troops, in October 1793 during the War of the First Coalition. The regiment next saw action when a squadron under Major Piercy Smith charged the rebels at the capture of Lucknow in March 1858 during the Indian Rebellion. It suffered heavy losses in an action at Leeukop in March 1902 during the Second Boer War.

=== First World War ===
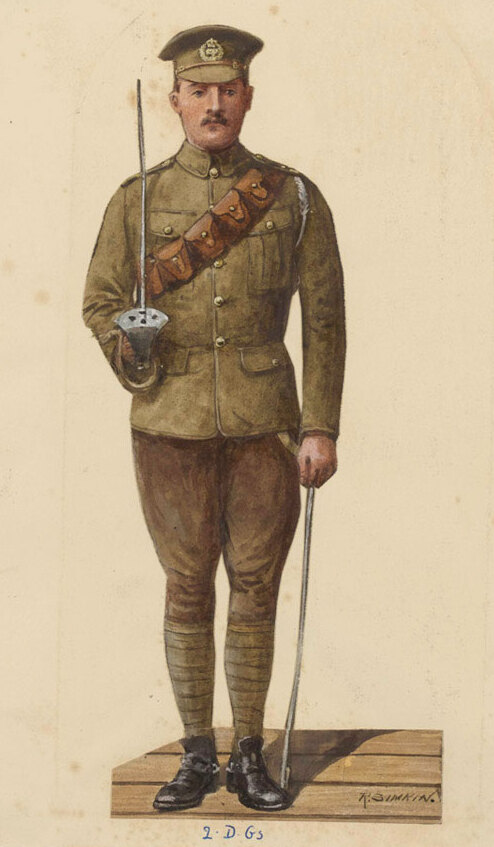
c. 1910 illustration of a regimental private

The regiment, which had been was stationed at Aldershot at the start of the war, landed in France as part of the 1st Cavalry Brigade in the 1st Cavalry Division, part of the Expeditionary Force, in August 1914 for service on the Western Front. The regiment took part in the Great Retreat in August 1914, the Battle of Le Cateau in August 1914, the First Battle of the Marne in September 1914, the Battle of Messines in October 1914, the First Battle of Ypres in October 1914, the Battle of the Somme in Autumn 1916, the Battle of Cambrai in November 1917, the Battle of the Scarpe in August 1918 and in the final advance of Autumn 1918.

=== Inter-war ===
The regiment was renamed the Queen's Bays (2nd Dragoon Guards) in 1921. The regiment served as horse cavalry until 1937, when it was mechanised with light tanks. The regiment became part of the Royal Armoured Corps in 1939.

=== Second World War ===
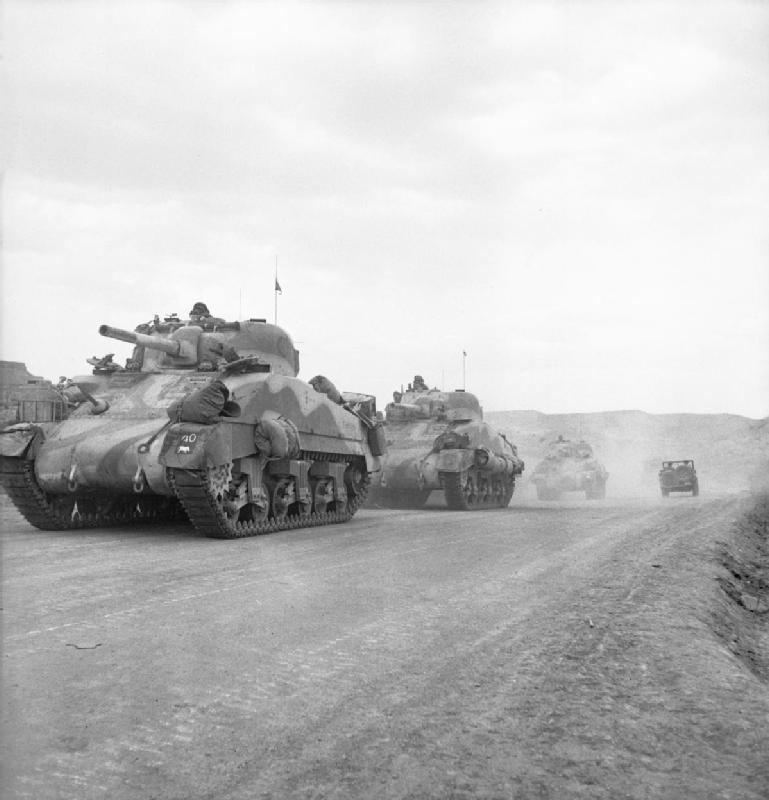
Regimental M4 Shermans at the Battle of Wadi Akarit in Tunisia, 7 April 1943

At the outbreak of the Second World War, in September 1939, the regiment was in England, assigned to the 2nd Light Armoured Brigade (serving alongside the 9th Queen's Royal Lancers and the 10th Royal Hussars) of the 1st Armoured Division. In May 1940, the Bays went to France and was heavily engaged on the Somme during the Battle of France. In mid June, with the collapse of French resistance, the regiment was evacuated to England through the port of Brest. The regiment was deployed to the Middle East in November 1941, equipped initially with the Crusader tank, and took part in the Battle of Gazala in May 1942, where its men were in action for 19 days, a record for an armoured regiment in the Western Desert. The regiment also took part in the First Battle of El Alamein in July 1942, the Second Battle of El Alamein in October 1942, the Battle of the Mareth Line in March 1943 and the Tunisian campaign in May 1943. The regiment was deployed on the Italian Front in May 1944: its men took part in the Battle of the Argenta Gap in April 1945 during the final offensive of the Italian Campaign.

=== Post war ===
After the war, the regiment remained in northern Italy, at Pegi on the River Isonzo, and then moved to Egypt in June 1947 before returning to Dale Barracks in Chester in October 1947. The regiment moved on to Bad Fallingbostel in Germany in 1949, before returning to Tidworth Camp in September 1954 and then deploying to Aqaba in Jordan later in the year. It deployed to Libya in February 1956 and then returned to Perham Down in August 1957 before transferring to Northampton Barracks in Wolfenbüttel in 1958. The regiment amalgamated with the 1st King's Dragoon Guards in 1959 to form the 1st The Queen's Dragoon Guards.

== Regimental museum ==
The regimental collection is displayed at Firing Line: Cardiff Castle Museum of the Welsh Soldier in Cardiff.

== Battle honours ==
The regiment's battle honours were as follows:

- Early Wars: Warburg, Willems, Lucknow, South Africa 1901–02
- The Great War: Mons, Le Cateau, Retreat from Mons, Marne 1914, Aisne 1914, Messines 1914, Armentières 1914, Ypres 1914 '15, Frezenberg, Bellewaarde, Somme 1916 '18, Flers-Courcelette, Arras 1917, Scarpe 1917, Cambrai 1917 '18, St. Quentin, Bapaume 1918, Rosières, Amiens, Albert 1918, Hindenburg Line, St. Quentin Canal, Beaurevoir, Pursuit to Mons, France and Flanders 1914–18
- The Second World War: Somme 1940, Withdrawal to Seine, North-West Europe 1940, Msus, Gazala, Bir el Aslagh, Cauldron, Knightsbridge, Via Balbia, Mersa Matruh, El Alamein, Tebaga Gap, El Hamma, El Kourzia, Djebel Kournine, Tunis, Creteville Pass, North Africa 1941–43, Coriano, Carpineta, Lamone Crossing, Defence of Lamone Bridgehead, Rimini Line, Ceriano Ridge, Cesena, Argenta Gap, Italy 1944–45

== Regimental Colonels ==
Regimental colonels have included:

The Earl of Peterborough's Regiment of Horse (1685); Villiers (1689); Leveson's (1694); Harveys (1699);

- 1685–1688: Col. Henry Mordaunt, 2nd Earl of Peterborough, KG
- 1688–1694: Brig-Gen. Hon. Edward Villiers
- 1694–1699: Brig-Gen Richard Leveson
- 1699–1712: Gen. Daniel Harvey
- 1712–1715: Col. John Bland

The Princess of Wales's Own Regiment of Horse - (1715)

- 1715–1726: Col. Thomas Pitt, 1st Earl of Londonderry
- 1726–1733: F.M. John Campbell, 2nd Duke of Argyll, KG, KT

The Queen's Own Regiment of Horse - (1727)

- 1733–1740: Gen. William Evans
- 1740–1749: Gen. John Montagu, 2nd Duke of Montagu, KG, KB

The Queen's Regiment of Dragoon Guards - (1746)

- 1749–1753: F.M. Sir John Ligonier, KB

2nd (The Queen's) Regiment of Dragoon Guards - (1751)

- 1753–1757: Maj-Gen. Hon. William Herbert
- 1757–1759: Lt-Gen. Lord George Sackville
- 1759–1773: Gen. John Waldegrave, 3rd Earl Waldegrave

2nd Dragoon Guards (Queen's Bays) - (1767)

- 1773–1807: F.M. George Townshend, 1st Marquess Townshend
- 1807–1821: Lt-Gen. Sir Charles Cregan Craufurd, GCB
- 1821–1831: Gen. William Loftus
- 1831–1837: Gen. Sir James Hay, KCH
- 1837–1853: Gen. Sir Thomas Gage Montresor, KCH, KC
- 1853–1873: Gen. Hon. Henry Frederick Compton Cavendish
- 1873–1874: Gen. Sir Henry Dalrymple White, KCB
- 1874–1881: Gen. Alexander Low, CB
- 1881–1894: Gen. Sir Charles Pyndar Beauchamp Walker, KCB
- 1894–1921: Gen. Sir William Henry Seymour, KCB

The Queen's Bays (2nd Dragoon Guards) - (1921)

- 1921–1930: Lt-Gen. Sir Hew Dalrymple Fanshawe, KCB, KCMG
- 1930–1945: Lt-Gen. Sir Antony Ernest Wentworth Harman, KCB, DSO
- 1945–1954: Brig. James Joseph Kingstone, CBE, DSO, MC
- 1954–1959: Col. George William Charles Draffen, DSO

== See also ==
- British cavalry during the First World War

== Sources ==
- Richards, Walter (1890). Her Majesty's Army (PDF). London: J. S. Virtue and Co.
