= Peter Walwyn =

British horse trainer (1933-2017)

Peter Walwyn MBE
Personal information
- Born: 1 July 1933
- Died: 7 December 2017 (aged 84)
- Education: Charterhouse School
- Occupation: Trainer
- Parent: Charles Walwyn (father)
- Relative: Fulke Walwyn

Horse racing career
- Sport: Horse racing

Major racing wins
- British Classic Race wins: 1,000 Guineas (1); Epsom Oaks (1); Epsom Derby (1)

Honours
- Champion Trainer (1974, 1975)

Significant horses
- Grundy, Polygamy, Humble Duty

Peter Tyndall Walwyn, MBE (1 July 1933 – 7 December 2017) was a British racehorse trainer. He was based at stables in the Lambourn, Berkshire, area and enjoyed his period of greatest success in the mid-1970s when he was British flat racing Champion Trainer twice.

== Early life ==
Walwyn came from a racing family – he was the cousin of trainer Fulke Walwyn. His father was Charles "Taffy" Walwyn DSO MC. He was educated at Charterhouse School.

== Career ==
His first job in racing was as assistant to trainer Geoffrey Brooke. He then held the licence for Helen Johnson Houghton, twin sister to Fulke Walwyn (women were not recognised as licensed trainers by the Jockey Club in those days). In October 1960 he took out a licence to train and in 1965 he moved to the stables at Seven Barrows where he spent the majority of his career. Towards the end of his career he moved to Windsor House stables in Lambourn. His principal stable jockeys were Duncan Keith, Pat Eddery and Joe Mercer.

He was one of the leading trainers in Britain during the 1970s, winning the Champion Trainer title in both 1974 and 1975. The most notable horse he trained was Grundy, winner of The Derby, Irish Derby and King George VI and Queen Elizabeth Stakes in 1975.

He retired as a trainer in 1999 but remained involved in horse racing organisations, serving as Chairman of the Lambourn Trainers Association. He was elected to honorary membership of the Jockey Club on his retirement.

== Later life ==
Walwyn was appointed Member of the Order of the British Empire (MBE) in the 2012 New Year Honours for services to horseracing. He died on 7 December 2017, aged 84.

== British Classic wins ==
- 1,000 Guineas – (1) – Humble Duty (1970)
- Epsom Oaks – (1) – Polygamy (1974)
- Epsom Derby – (1) – Grundy (1975)

== Irish Classic wins ==
- Irish Derby – Grundy (1975)
- Irish 2,000 Guineas – Grundy (1975)
