= Grey Sovereign =

British-bred Thoroughbred racehorse

- Sire: Nasrullah
- Grandsire: Nearco
- Dam: Kong
- Damsire: Baytown
- Sex: Stallion
- Foaled: 1948
- Died: 1976 (aged 27–28)
- Country: United Kingdom
- Colour: Grey
- Breeder: William Hill
- Owner: J K Measures
- Trainer: George Beeby
- Record: 22-8-2-1

Major wins
- Richmond Stakes (1950)

Grey Sovereign (1948–1976) was a British Thoroughbred racehorse and sire. As a racehorse he was a successful sprinter but not a champion, recording his biggest success when he won the Richmond Stakes as a two-year-old in 1950. His career was compromised by his difficult and unpredictable temperament. After his retirement from racing he became a successful and influential breeding stallion.

== Background ==
Grey Sovereign was a grey horse bred by the bookmaker William Hill. He was sired by Nasrullah who was the Leading sire in Great Britain and Ireland in 1951 and went on went on to become the Leading sire in North America on five occasions. Grey Sovereign's dam, Kong, was a sprinter whose victories included the Wokingham Stakes at Royal Ascot. Kong also produced Grey Sovereign's three-quarter brother Nimbus (sired by Nasrullah's sire Nearco) who won the 2000 Guineas and The Derby in 1949.

As a yearling Grey Sovereign was offered for sale. George Colling, who had trained Nimbus, was interested in the colt but was deterred from buying him by his fractious behaviour in the sales ring. He was bought for 6,700 guineas by J K Measures and sent into training with George Beeby.

== Racing career ==
As a racehorse, Grey Sovereign was described as "brilliant but hot-tempered". He recorded his most important success as a two-year-old when he won the Richmond Stakes over six furlongs at Goodwood Racecourse. In the same year he finished third to Belle of All and Royal Serenade in the National Breeders' Produce Stakes after having been left behind at the start, and was the beaten favourite in the Coventry Stakes at Royal Ascot. In the following year he finished second to Hard Sauce in the Challenge Stakes at Newmarket Racecourse.

As a four-year-old, Grey Sovereign won the Festival Stakes at Birmingham Racecourse in June, beating Royal Serenade by a head. He was narrowly beaten by Royal Serenade in the Nunthorpe Stakes, but returned to win the Union Stakes at Birmingham in September.

== Stud career ==
At the end of his racing career, Grey Sovereign was retired to stud where he became a very successful breeding stallion. He was the leading sire of two-year-olds in Britain in 1958 and 1961 and the leading sire of two-year-olds in France in 1967. Grey Sovereign was retired from stud duty in 1972 and died on 4 January 1976.

Grey Sovereign's offspring included:

- Don, winner of the Poule d'Essai des Poulains
- Fortino, sire of Caro
- Grey Monarch, winner of the Saratoga Special Stakes
- Gustav, winner of the Middle Park Stakes
- La Tendresse, top-rated European two-year-old
- Raffingora, winner of the Temple Stakes and King George Stakes
- Sovereign Lord, winner of the Gimcrack Stakes
- Sovereign Path, winner of the Lockinge Stakes and Queen Elizabeth II Stakes, sire of Humble Duty
- Young Emperor, winner of the Gimcrack Stakes
- Zeddaan, winner of the Poule d'Essai des Poulains and a successful sire

== Pedigree ==
Pedigree of Grey Sovereign (GB), grey stallion, 1948
| Sire Nasrullah (GB) 1940 | Nearco (ITY); 1935 | Pharos | Phalaris |
| Sire Nasrullah (GB) 1940 | Nearco (ITY); 1935 | Pharos | Scapa Flow |
| Sire Nasrullah (GB) 1940 | Nearco (ITY); 1935 | Nogara | Havresac |
| Sire Nasrullah (GB) 1940 | Nearco (ITY); 1935 | Nogara | Catnip |
| Sire Nasrullah (GB) 1940 | Mumtaz Begum (FR); 1932 | Blenheim | Blandford |
| Sire Nasrullah (GB) 1940 | Mumtaz Begum (FR); 1932 | Blenheim | Malva |
| Sire Nasrullah (GB) 1940 | Mumtaz Begum (FR); 1932 | Mumtaz Mahal | The Tetrarch |
| Sire Nasrullah (GB) 1940 | Mumtaz Begum (FR); 1932 | Mumtaz Mahal | Lady Josephine |
| Dam Kong (GB) 1933 | Baytown (IRE); 1925 | Achtoi | Santoi |
| Dam Kong (GB) 1933 | Baytown (IRE); 1925 | Achtoi | Achray |
| Dam Kong (GB) 1933 | Baytown (IRE); 1925 | Princess Herodias | Poor Boy |
| Dam Kong (GB) 1933 | Baytown (IRE); 1925 | Princess Herodias | Queen Herodias |
| Dam Kong (GB) 1933 | Clang (GB); 1925 | Hainault | Swynford |
| Dam Kong (GB) 1933 | Clang (GB); 1925 | Hainault | Bromus |
| Dam Kong (GB) 1933 | Clang (GB); 1925 | Vibration | Black Jester |
| Dam Kong (GB) 1933 | Clang (GB); 1925 | Vibration | Radiancy (Family 6-f) |
