= Vedette (horse) =

British-bred Thoroughbred racehorse

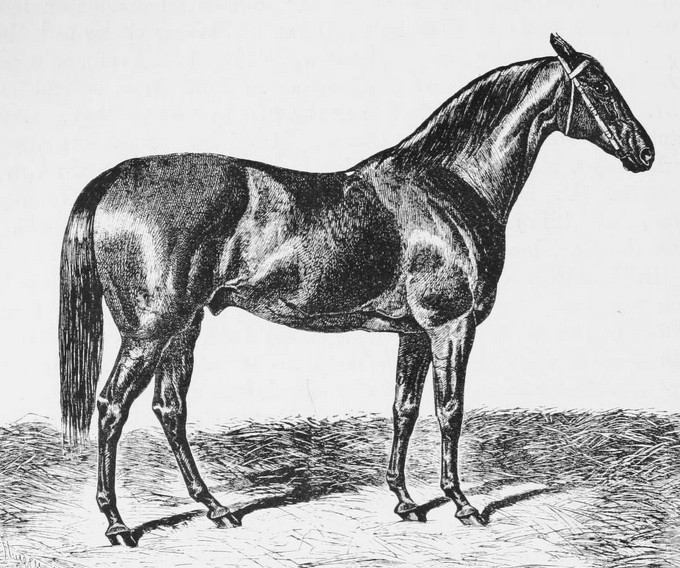
- Drawing of Vedette
- Sire: Voltigeur
- Grandsire: Voltaire
- Dam: Mrs. Ridgway
- Damsire: Birdcatcher
- Sex: Stallion
- Foaled: 1854
- Died: 1881 (aged 26–27)
- Country: Great Britain
- Colour: Brown
- Breeder: Mr. Chilton; Anthony Harrison
- Owner: 2nd Earl of Zetland
- Trainer: George Abdale
- Record: 9: 7-1-1

Major wins
- 2000 Guineas Stakes (1857); Great Yorkshire Stakes (1857); Doncaster Cup (1857, 1858); Great Ebor Handicap (1858)

Vedette (1854–1881) was a British Thoroughbred racehorse who won the 2000 Guineas Stakes and two Doncaster Cups. He also sired Epsom Derby winner and Champion sire, Galopin. He was owned by Thomas Dundas, 2nd Earl of Zetland and trained by George Abdale.

== Background ==
Vedette was bred by Mr. Chilton and Anthony Harrison and was a brown (almost black) colt foaled in 1854. He was sired by Epsom Derby and St. Leger Stakes winner Voltigeur. His dam was Mrs. Ridgway, a daughter of Birdcatcher.

== Racing career ==
=== 1856: two-year-old season ===
In August 1856 he finished third in the Eglington Stakes over one mile at York. The race was won by the favourite Augury. In October he won the Bedford Stakes at by two lengths from The Western Power, after starting as the 4/6 favourite. At the end of the year he was priced around 7/1 for the 1857 2000 Guineas Stakes.

=== 1857: three-year-old season ===
Vedette returned to the racecourse as a three-year-old in the 2000 Guineas Stakes at Newmarket. He started the one-mile race as the 5/2 favourite of the eleven strong field. Also near the front of the betting were Loyola at 4/1, Kent at 9/2 and Anton at 5/1. The horses got away to an even break on the second start attempt and Turbit immediately took the lead, with Vedette a few lengths behind in fourth place. As they neared the closing stages Loyola (who was racing with Anton on the other side of the track) and Vedette caught and passed Turbit. Anton was winning by about a length in the final furlong, but Vedette produced a "tremendous rush" and overtook him in the last 50 yards. Vedette won the race by three quarters of a length from Anton, who finished a head in front a third placed Loyola. After winning the 2000 Guineas Vedette was very lame and had to hobble back from the weighing room to his stable. He was unable to run until the Great Yorkshire Stakes at York in August, where he was the 2/5 favourite. He won the race by three lengths from Skirmisher, with Saunterer about three lengths further behind in third place. Vedette then went to Doncaster and won the Fitzwilliam Stakes by a neck from Princess Royal. His final race of the season came in the Doncaster Cup, which he won by a neck from Black Tommy.

=== 1858: four-year-old season ===
Vedette's first race as a four-year-old came on 9 April 1858 in the Port Stakes at Newmarket. The race was over a distance just short of two miles and Vedette started as the 4/6 favourite. He led his only opponent, Odd Trick, in the early stages, but was then overtaken and was beaten by three quarters of a length. Vedette then won the Great Ebor Handicap by half a length from Tunstall Maid, after starting as the 5/2 favourite. Tunstall Maid was a further three lengths clear of third placed Fisherman. Vedette's final race came in the Doncaster Cup. Vedette started as the 1/2 favourite, with Saunterer next in the betting at 6/1, then Fisherman at 7/1 and Black Tommy at 100/8. Vedette won the two and a half mile race by half a length from Saunterer, with Black Tommy a further six lengths behind in third place. His win was thought of as a win for all of Yorkshire and apparently there hadn't been "such cheering and waving of hats" since Voltigeur won the St Leger Stakes and Doncaster Cup in 1850.

== Assessment ==
Vedette was generally regarded as the best of the 1854 foals.

== Stud record ==
Verdette sired Speculum who won the Goodwood Cup and City and Suburban Handicap. Speculum was also a successful sire, with his progeny including Epsom Derby winner Sefton and becoming British Champion sire in 1878. Verdette's best son was Galopin who won the Epsom Derby in 1875 and was British Champion sire three times. Vedette's sire line survives today mainly through Galopin's son, the undefeated St Simon, who was Champion sire nine times.

== Sire line tree ==
Descendants of Vedette (click to show)
- Vedette
  - Ashstead
    - Apollo
  - Speculum
    - Rosebery
      - Primrose
      - Dalmeny
      - Crowberry
        - King Crow
      - Amphion
        - Rampion
        - Horoscope
        - Isador
        - Dieudonne
        - Sundridge
        - Eminent
        - Ampelion
        - Lally
        - Acclaim
        - Elmstead
        - The Nut
      - Middleham
      - Knight Of The Thistle
        - Worth
    - Castlereagh
      - Why Not
      - Clorane
    - Sefton
      - Aintree
      - Lourdes
    - Sans Pareil
    - Goggles
    - Hagioscope
      - Cotillon
      - Burnaby
      - Queen's Birthday
        - Santoi
          - Claretoi
          - Yentoi
          - Lagos
          - Fiz Yama
          - Santair
          - China Cock
            - Cockpit
          - Shogun
          - Sandow
          - Achtoi
            - Artic Star
            - Baytown
            - Poor Man
              - Poor Jack
            - Achtenan
            - Alcazar
              - Apache
                - Tribe
            - Cariff
          - Sanctum
          - Corn Tassel
          - Glasstoi
          - He
          - Gay Lord
          - Souviens Toi
          - Yutoi
            - Roman Hackle
          - Ballyheron
          - Koko
          - Santorb
            - Furstenbrauch
          - Sun-Yat-Sen
            - Wot No Sun
        - Howletts
        - Holiday House
      - Lauriscope
      - Quaesitum
      - Lynchnoscope
      - Roughside
      - Flacon
      - Uncle Mac
        - Fair Mac
        - Bohernore
        - Shaun Aboo
          - Shaun Goilin
      - Mirthful
        - Mexican
        - Skilful
    - Adanapaar
      - Times
    - Splendor
      - Jeweller
        - Street Arab
    - Almoner
    - Duncombe
    - Gloriation
  - Galopin
    - Fulmen
      - Impuls
    - Galliard
      - Gulliver
      - War Dance
        - Perth
        - St Caprais
        - Mordant
      - Griffin
      - Beowulf
    - Grafton
    - Marmiton
    - Donovan
      - Matchmaker
        - Handicapper
      - Velasquez
      - O'Donovan Rossa
      - Veronese
    - Wild Monk
      - Easter Prize
        - Shaun Spadah
    - Galeazzo
      - Glacier
      - Saturno
      - Prometeo
      - Flower Boy
      - Hamisi
      - Kibwesi
        - Senecio
      - Kosheni
    - Galloping Lad
      - Cliftonhall
        - Music Hall
    - Disraeli
    - St Gris
      - Glenside
    - St Simon
      - St Andrew
        - St Jude
      - St Serf
        - Cavelry
        - Challacombe
      - Adieu
      - Simonian
        - Nuage
      - D'Arenberg
        - Marcellinus
      - Quidnunc
      - St Damian
        - St Julien
        - Cheri
        - Burgrave
        - Lutteur
        - Or Duh Rhin
      - The Cellarer
        - The Oak
      - Bill Of Portland
        - Bobadil
        - Merriwee
        - Maltster
      - Childwick
        - General Symons
        - Negofol
      - Haut Brion
      - Raeburn
        - Rascal
      - Soult
        - Master Soult
        - Wairiki
        - Antagonist
        - Beau Soult
      - St Florian
        - Ard Patrick
      - Florizel II
        - Doricles
        - Mackintosh
        - Volodyovski
        - Royal Arch
        - Vedas
        - Southannon
        - Fulmen
        - Floreal
        - Anmer
      - Matchbox
        - Con Amore
      - St Aiden
        - Moorside
      - Raconteur
        - Blagueur
      - St Bris
        - St Caradec
      - Persimmon
        - Out Of Reach
        - Zinfandel
        - Royal Dream
        - Sea King
        - Your Majesty
        - Comedy King
        - Prince Palatine
      - Phoebus Appolo
        - Apologue
      - Positano
        - Lord Cardigan
        - Poseidon
        - Lord Nolan
        - Piastre
      - St Frusquin
        - Fortunatus
        - St Alwyne
        - Barcadaile
        - Rydal Head
        - St Amant
        - Frustrum
        - Martin Lightfoot
        - St Wolf
        - Cipango
        - Greenback
        - St Just
        - Pietri
        - St Anton
        - Lorenzo
        - Day Comet
        - Ecouen
        - St Cyr
      - Cyrenian
      - Desmond
        - Earla Mor
        - Tamasha
        - Shanid-A-Boo
        - Farasi
        - Land League
        - Machakos
        - The White Knight
        - Sir Archibald
        - Declare
        - Charles O'Malley
        - Demosthenes
        - Desman
        - Hall Cross
        - Lomond
        - Aboyeur
        - Craganour
        - Seremond
        - Marchmond
        - Hapsburg
        - Stornoway
        - Atheling
        - Limond
      - Sandringham
        - Royal Tourist
      - Diamond Jubilee
        - Bellerophon
        - Sancy
        - Queen's Advocate
        - Weber
        - Coup De Vent
        - As De Espadas
        - Last Reason
        - Mustafa
        - Ricuarte
        - Smasher
        - Campanazo
        - Melik
        - Saca Chispas
        - Moloch
        - Mehemet Ali
      - Sidus
      - Lauzun
        - Melbourne
        - Gros Papa
      - Pietermaritzburg
        - Pioneer
        - Amsterdam
        - Brasil
        - Saint Marceaux
      - William The Third
        - Willonyx
        - King William
        - Sandal
        - Wrinkler
        - Rembrandt
        - Pilliwinkie
        - Beau Bill
        - Winkie
        - Nassovian
      - Chaucer
        - Stedfast
        - Donnithorne
        - Dan Russell
        - Dansellon
        - Prince Chimay
        - Donzelon
        - Lord Chaucer
        - Rattlin' The Reefer
      - Rabelais
        - Jacobi
        - Verdun
        - Long Set
        - Rire Aux Larmes
        - Durbar
        - Munibe
        - Haki
        - Lord Loris
        - Naturalist
        - Havresac
        - Radames
        - Pendennis
        - Ramus
        - Biribi
        - Rialto
        - Fenimore Cooper
      - Darley Dale
      - St Savin
        - St Charlcote
      - Bright Steel
        - Westcourt
      - Juggernaut
      - St Girons
        - Patron Saint

== Pedigree ==
Pedigree of Vedette, brown stallion, 1854
Sire Voltigeur (GB) br. 1847	Voltaire br. 1826	Blacklock* b. 1814	Whitelock
Sire Voltigeur (GB) br. 1847	Voltaire br. 1826	Blacklock* b. 1814	Coriander mare
Sire Voltigeur (GB) br. 1847	Voltaire br. 1826	Phantom mare 1816	Phantom
Sire Voltigeur (GB) br. 1847	Voltaire br. 1826	Phantom mare 1816	Overton mare
Sire Voltigeur (GB) br. 1847	Martha Lynn br. 1837	Mulatto b. 1823	Catton
Sire Voltigeur (GB) br. 1847	Martha Lynn br. 1837	Mulatto b. 1823	Desdemona
Sire Voltigeur (GB) br. 1847	Martha Lynn br. 1837	Leda; 1824	Filho da Puta
Sire Voltigeur (GB) br. 1847	Martha Lynn br. 1837	Leda; 1824	Treasure
Dam Mrs Ridgway (GB) 1849	Birdcatcher ch. 1833	Sir Hercules blk. 1826	Whalebone
Dam Mrs Ridgway (GB) 1849	Birdcatcher ch. 1833	Sir Hercules blk. 1826	Peri
Dam Mrs Ridgway (GB) 1849	Birdcatcher ch. 1833	Guiccioli ch. 1823	Bob Booty
Dam Mrs Ridgway (GB) 1849	Birdcatcher ch. 1833	Guiccioli ch. 1823	Flight
Dam Mrs Ridgway (GB) 1849	Nan Darrell; 1844	Inheritor blk. 1831	Lottery
Dam Mrs Ridgway (GB) 1849	Nan Darrell; 1844	Inheritor blk. 1831	Handmaiden
Dam Mrs Ridgway (GB) 1849	Nan Darrell; 1844	Nell; 1831	Blacklock*
Dam Mrs Ridgway (GB) 1849	Nan Darrell; 1844	Nell; 1831	Madame Vestris

Note: b. = Bay, blk. = Black, br. = Brown, ch. = Chestnut

* Vedette is inbred 3S x 4D to the stallion Blacklock, meaning that he appears third generation on the sire side of his pedigree and fourth generation on the dam side of his pedigree.
