= Galopin =

British-bred Thoroughbred racehorse

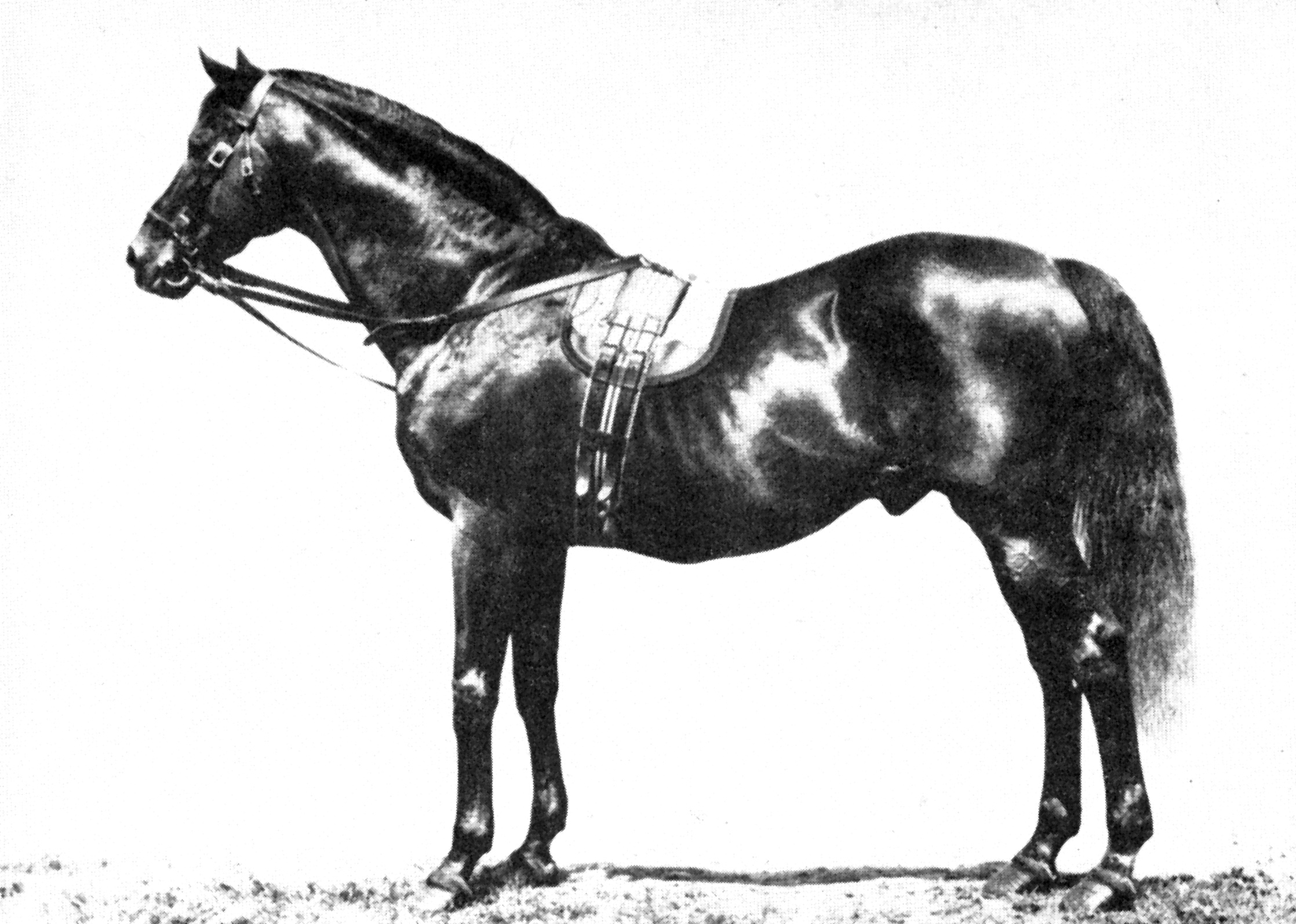
- Sire: Vedette
- Grandsire: Voltigeur
- Dam: Flying Duchess
- Damsire: The Flying Dutchman
- Sex: Stallion
- Foaled: 1872
- Died: 1899 (aged 26–27)
- Country: United Kingdom of Great Britain and Ireland
- Colour: Bay
- Breeder: William Taylor Sharpe
- Owner: Prince Gustavus Batthyany; Henry Chaplin, 1st Viscount Chaplin
- Trainer: John Dawson, Sr.
- Record: 9: 8–1–0
- Earnings: £4,950

Major wins
- Fern Hill Stakes (1874, 1875); New Stakes (1874); Epsom Derby (1875)

Awards
- Leading sire in GB & Ireland (1888, 1889, 1898)

Galopin (1872–1899) was a British Thoroughbred racehorse and sire. In a racing career which lasted from June 1874 until October 1875 he ran nine times and won eight races. He was one of the best British two-year-olds of 1874, winning his first three races before sustaining the only defeat of his career in the Middle Park Plate. In 1875, he won all five of his races including the Derby. At the end of the season he was retired to stud where he became an extremely successful and influential breeding stallion.

== Background ==
Galopin was a bay stallion standing 15.3 hands high, bred in Lincolnshire by William Taylor Sharpe. His reported sire, Vedette, was a successful racehorse, winning the Great Yorkshire Stakes, the Doncaster Cup (twice), and the 1857 2,000 Guineas Stakes. Vedette's value as a stallion had declined to such an extent that he was sold at auction for 42 guineas when he was seventeen. Apart from Galopin, the best of Vedette's offspring was Speculum, who won the Goodwood Cup, the Suburban Handicap, was third in The Derby, and was Britain's Champion Sire in 1878. Vedette also sired some good hunters. Genetic evidence indicates that Galopin's offspring do not share the Y chromosome haplotype of the sire line to which Vedette belongs. This substantiates earlier suggestions that another horse, Delight, belonging to the sire line with the Y chromosome haplotype corresponding to that inferred for Galopin, was the latter's true sire. Galopin's dam Flying Duchess (1853) was by the 1849 Epsom Derby winner The Flying Dutchman.

As a foal, Galopin and his mother were sold for a combined price of 100 guineas by a representative of the Middle Park stud. A year later, the yearling was offered for sale again, and was bought for 520 guineas by the Hungarian aristocrat Gustavus Batthyany, acting on the advice of his private trainer John Dawson. Galopin was trained by Dawson at Batthyany's Warren House stable at Newmarket, Suffolk.

== Racing career ==
=== 1874: two-year-old season ===
On his first appearance on a racecourse, Galopin finished second in the Hyde Park Stakes at Epsom Downs Racecourse. After Galopin's jockey lodged an objection however, the winner was disqualified and the colt was credited with a winning debut. At Royal Ascot in June, Galopin ran twice, winning the New Stakes and the Fern Hill Stakes, both over five furlongs

After a break of almost four months, Galopin returned to the racecourse in October to contest the Middle Park Plate, the most valuable and prestigious race of the season for two-year-olds. He finished third to Plebeian, but appeared to be a very unlucky loser, having been badly hampered and almost falling a furlong from the finish. Dawson thought so highly of the colt that he intended to run him in a trial against the five-year-old Prince Charlie, the winner of the 2000 Guineas and the leading sprinter in England. Batthyany, however, refused to allow the match as he felt that the test would be too severe for his colt.

=== 1875: three-year-old season ===
Galopin began his three-year-old career by running a match race against a filly named Stray Shot over Newmarket's Rowley Mile course. He won by ten lengths to claim the £500 stake money. At Epsom, Galopin started the 2/1 favourite for the Derby against seventeen opponents. Ridden by John Morris, he won comfortably by a length from Claremont. The race was rather closer than it might have been as Morris eased the colt down in the closing stages. After his win in the Derby, Galopin's owners took the unusual step of returning the horse to sprint distances. At Royal Ascot he won his second Fern Hill Stakes, beating the filly Bella.

Galopin had never been entered for the St Leger Stakes and did not appear again until October. At Newmarket he won a £1,000 match race against the five-year-old Lowlander, the winner of the Royal Hunt Cup and the All-Aged Stakes. His final race came two days later in the Newmarket Derby in which he defeated the St Leger winner Craig Millar.

Batthyany had a heart condition that enforced early retirement of Galopin as it was feared that the excitement of watching his horse race may risk the Prince's life.

== Stud record ==
After the death of the Prince in 1883, Galopin was sold to Henry Chaplin for 8,000 guineas, but was not initially well received as a stallion because of the presence of Blacklock in his pedigree. He later stood at Blankney Hall, Sleaford, Lincolnshire.

Foaled	Name	Sex	Major Wins/Achievements
1881	St. Simon	Stallion	Goodwood Cup, Leading sire in Great Britain and Ireland, Leading broodmare sire in Great Britain and Ireland
1886	Donovan	Stallion	Epsom Derby, St Leger Stakes
1892	Galeottia	Mare	1000 Guineas Stakes
1895	Disraeli	Stallion	2000 Guineas Stakes
	Galliard	Stallion	

Galopin was the leading sire in Great Britain and Ireland in 1888, 1889 and 1898 and topped the broodmare sire list four times. He was the damsire of Bayardo and of the 1886 U.K. Triple Crown Champion, Flying Fox.

== Assessment and honours ==
In May 1886 The Sporting Times carried out a poll of one hundred racing experts to create a ranking of the best British racehorses of the 19th century. Galopin was ranked nineteenth, having been placed in the top ten by 14 of the contributors. He was the third highest ranked horse of the 1870s, behind Isonomy and Cremorne.

From 1925, the London & North Eastern Railway had a tradition of naming locomotives after prominent racehorses, and their Class A1 locomotive no. 2575 (later British Railways no. 60076), which had been built in October 1924, was named Galopin after this horse, and remained in service until October 1962.

== Sire line tree ==
Descendants of Galopin (click to show)
- Galopin
  - Fulmen
    - Impuls
  - Galliard
    - Gulliver
    - War Dance
      - Perth
        - Borax
        - Go To Bed
        - Kalisz
        - My Pet
        - Diadoque
        - Magellan
        - Northeast
        - Hag To Hag
        - Maboul
        - Ramesseum
        - Alcantara
        - Faucheur
        - Matterhorn
      - St Caprais
        - Creso
      - Mordant
    - Griffin
    - Beowulf
  - Grafton
  - Marmiton
  - Donovan
    - Matchmaker
      - Handicapper
    - Velasquez
    - O'Donovan Rossa
    - Veronese
  - Wild Monk
    - Easter Prize
      - Shaun Spadah
  - Galeazzo
    - Glacier
    - Saturno
    - Prometeo
    - Flower Boy
    - Hamisi
    - Kibwesi
      - Senecio
    - Kosheni
  - Galloping Lad
    - Cliftonhall
      - Music Hall
  - Disraeli
  - St Gris
    - Glenside
  - St Simon
    - St Andrew
      - St Jude
    - St Serf
      - Cavelry
      - Challacombe
    - Adieu
    - Simonian
      - Nuage
        - Gibtralter
        - Omen
        - Ordensjager
    - D'Arenberg
      - Marcellinus
    - Quidnunc
    - St Damian
      - St Julien
        - Chulo
      - Cheri
      - Burgrave
      - Lutteur
      - Or Duh Rhin
    - The Cellarer
      - The Oak
    - Bill Of Portland
      - Bobadil
        - The Parisian
      - Merriwee
      - Maltster
        - Alawa
        - Malt King
        - Popinjay
    - Childwick
      - General Symons
        - Sergeant Murphy
      - Negofol
        - Hourless
        - Juveigneur
        - Tchad
        - Flechois
        - Coventry
        - Dangerous
        - Espino
        - Bois De Rose
        - Vito
    - Haut Brion
    - Raeburn
      - Rascal
    - Soult
      - Master Soult
      - Wairiki
        - Chesterfield
      - Antagonist
        - Winter Wind
      - Beau Soult
        - Beauford
    - St Florian
      - Ard Patrick
        - Anklang
        - Huon
        - Lapis Lazuli
        - Marabou
        - Lucullus
        - Dolomit
        - Octopus
        - Ariel
        - Terminus
    - Florizel II
      - Doricles
        - Consols
        - Montmartin
      - Mackintosh
      - Volodyovski
      - Royal Arch
      - Vedas
      - Southannon
      - Fulmen
        - Leteo
      - Floreal
        - Tagor
      - Anmer
    - Matchbox
      - Con Amore
    - St Aiden
      - Moorside
        - Master Robert
    - Raconteur
      - Blagueur
    - St Bris
      - St Caradec
    - Persimmon
      - Out Of Reach
        - George Smith
      - Zinfandel
      - Royal Dream
        - Coq Gaulois
      - Sea King
        - Paul Jones
      - Your Majesty
        - Agueros
        - Henry Lee
        - Quemao
      - Comedy King
        - Artilleryman
        - King Ingoda
      - Prince Palatine
        - Donnacona
        - Prince Galahad
        - Prince Pal
        - Rose Prince
    - Phoebus Appolo
      - Apologue
    - Positano
      - Lord Cardigan
      - Poseidon
        - Telecles
        - Rascasse
      - Lord Nolan
      - Piastre
    - St Frusquin
      - Fortunatus
        - Posinatus
      - St Alwyne
        - Night Watch
        - Poitrel
      - Barcadaile
        - Vermouth
      - Rydal Head
        - Poethlyn
      - St Amant
      - Frustrum
        - Ballyboggan
      - Martin Lightfoot
        - Impudent Barney
      - St Wolf
        - Florilegio
        - Cad
        - Diogenes
        - Hijo Mio
        - Movedizo
        - Lombardo
        - Maron
        - Tagore
      - Cipango
        - Tipperary Tim
      - Greenback
        - Paper Money
      - St Just
        - Jus D'Orange
      - Pietri
      - St Anton
      - Lorenzo
      - Day Comet
        - Double Chance
      - Ecouen
      - St Cyr
    - Cyrenian
    - Desmond
      - Earla Mor
      - Tamasha
      - Shanid-A-Boo
      - Farasi
      - Land League
      - Machakos
      - The White Knight
      - Sir Archibald
        - Irish Elegance
      - Declare
      - Charles O'Malley
        - Light Dragoon
        - Legality
      - Demosthenes
        - Amythas
        - Gasbag
        - Statesman
      - Desman
        - Happy Man
      - Hall Cross
      - Lomond
        - Loch Lomond
        - Clackmannon
        - Ben Lomond
        - Lacio
      - Aboyeur
      - Craganour
        - Caricato
        - Beun Ojo
      - Seremond
        - Mollison
      - Marchmond
        - Fanmond
      - Hapsburg
        - Francis Joseph
        - Noble Star
      - Stornoway
      - Atheling
      - Limond
        - Limosin
        - Mask
        - Commendation
        - Limerick
        - Veilmond
    - Sandringham
      - Royal Tourist
    - Diamond Jubilee
      - Bellerophon
      - Sancy
      - Queen's Advocate
      - Weber
      - Coup De Vent
      - As De Espadas
        - Pombiquet
      - Last Reason
        - Ardelion
        - Madrigal
      - Mustafa
        - Almodovar
        - Portos
        - Bombero
        - Urbion
      - Ricuarte
      - Smasher
      - Campanazo
        - Ripley
        - Sin Sabor
        - Sol Naciente
        - Samuray
        - Brown Price
      - Melik
      - Saca Chispas
      - Moloch
        - Caimican
        - Prinaldo
      - Mehemet Ali
    - Sidus
    - Lauzun
      - Melbourne
        - Agiato
      - Gros Papa
        - Roi Belge
        - Millonaire
    - Pietermaritzburg
      - Pioneer
      - Amsterdam
      - Brasil
      - Saint Marceaux
    - William The Third
      - Willonyx
      - King William
        - Holbeach
      - Sandal
        - Macon
      - Wrinkler
      - Rembrandt
      - Pilliwinkie
        - Olibrius
      - Beau Bill
        - Thrown In
      - Winkie
      - Nassovian
        - Nassau
    - Chaucer
      - Stedfast
        - The Night Patrol
        - Musketoon
      - Donnithorne
      - Dan Russell
      - Dansellon
      - Prince Chimay
        - Vatout
      - Donzelon
      - Lord Chaucer
      - Rattlin' The Reefer
    - Rabelais
      - Jacobi
        - Nouvel An
      - Verdun
        - Soldat De Verdun
        - Barranquero
      - Long Set
      - Rire Aux Larmes
        - Losir
        - Take My Tip
      - Durbar
        - Scaramouche
        - Altay
        - Xander
        - Bathorse
        - Indian Salute
      - Munibe
      - Haki
      - Lord Loris
      - Naturalist
      - Havresac
        - Manistee
        - Lui
        - Dervio
        - Cavaliere d'Arpino
      - Radames
        - Motrico
      - Pendennis
      - Ramus
      - Biribi
        - Birikil
        - Labrador
        - Le Pacha
      - Rialto
        - Saranak
        - Sanguinetto
        - Hern The Hunter
        - Eros
        - Wild Risk
        - Houdon
        - Rabirius
      - Fenimore Cooper
        - Hunting Ground
    - Darley Dale
    - St Savin
      - St Charlcote
    - Bright Steel
      - Westcourt
    - Juggernaut
    - St Girons
      - Patron Saint

== Pedigree ==
General stud book

Pedigree of Galopin, bay stallion, 1872
Sire Vedette br. 1854	Voltigeur br. 1847	Voltaire* br. 1826	Blacklock*^
Sire Vedette br. 1854	Voltigeur br. 1847	Voltaire* br. 1826	Phantom mare*
Sire Vedette br. 1854	Voltigeur br. 1847	Matha Lynn ch. 1837	Mulatto
Sire Vedette br. 1854	Voltigeur br. 1847	Matha Lynn ch. 1837	Leda
Sire Vedette br. 1854	Mrs Ridgway b. 1849	Birdcatcher gr. 1833	Sir Hercules
Sire Vedette br. 1854	Mrs Ridgway b. 1849	Birdcatcher gr. 1833	Guiccioli
Sire Vedette br. 1854	Mrs Ridgway b. 1849	Nan Darrell b. 1844	Inheritor
Sire Vedette br. 1854	Mrs Ridgway b. 1849	Nan Darrell b. 1844	Nell^
Dam Flying Duchess b. 1853	The Flying Dutchman br. 1846	Bay Middleton b. 1833	Sultan
Dam Flying Duchess b. 1853	The Flying Dutchman br. 1846	Bay Middleton b. 1833	Cobweb
Dam Flying Duchess b. 1853	The Flying Dutchman br. 1846	Barbelle ch. 1836	Sandbeck
Dam Flying Duchess b. 1853	The Flying Dutchman br. 1846	Barbelle ch. 1836	Darioletta
Dam Flying Duchess b. 1853	Merope b. 1841	Voltaire* br. 1826	Blacklock*^
Dam Flying Duchess b. 1853	Merope b. 1841	Voltaire* br. 1826	Phantom Mare*
Dam Flying Duchess b. 1853	Merope b. 1841	Juniper Mare br. 1817	Juniper
Dam Flying Duchess b. 1853	Merope b. 1841	Juniper Mare br. 1817	Sorcerer mare (Family 3-i)

* Galopin is inbred 3S x 3D to the stallion Voltaire, meaning that he appears third generation on the sire side of his pedigree and third generation on the dam side of his pedigree.

*^ Galopin is inbred 4S x 5S x 4D to the stallion Blacklock, meaning that he appears fourth generation and fifth generation (via Nell)^ on the sire side of his pedigree and fourth generation on the dam side of his pedigree.

Y Chromosome analysis

Scientific research published in 2019 revealed that sons of St Simon (Persimmon and St Frusquin) had DNA with the Y chromosome associated with that of the Herod sire line rather than the Eclipse sire line. There is strong evidence that suggests that the sire of St Simon (Galopin) was sired by Delight of the Herod direct sire line, rather than Vedette of the Eclipse direct sire line.

Pedigree of Galopin, bay stallion, 1872 - Alternate
Sire Delight b. 1863	Ellington br. 1853	The Flying Dutchman* br. 1846	Bay Middleton*
Sire Delight b. 1863	Ellington br. 1853	The Flying Dutchman* br. 1846	Barbelle*
Sire Delight b. 1863	Ellington br. 1853	Ellerdale br. 1844	Lanercost
Sire Delight b. 1863	Ellington br. 1853	Ellerdale br. 1844	Tomboy mare
Sire Delight b. 1863	Placid b. 1850	Thistle Whipper b. 1838	Beagle
Sire Delight b. 1863	Placid b. 1850	Thistle Whipper b. 1838	Miss Maltby
Sire Delight b. 1863	Placid b. 1850	Passion ch. 1839	Elis
Sire Delight b. 1863	Placid b. 1850	Passion ch. 1839	Pet
Dam Flying Duchess b. 1853	The Flying Dutchman* br. 1846	Bay Middleton* b. 1833	Sultan*
Dam Flying Duchess b. 1853	The Flying Dutchman* br. 1846	Bay Middleton* b. 1833	Cobweb*
Dam Flying Duchess b. 1853	The Flying Dutchman* br. 1846	Barbelle* ch. 1836	Sandbeck*
Dam Flying Duchess b. 1853	The Flying Dutchman* br. 1846	Barbelle* ch. 1836	Darioletta*
Dam Flying Duchess b. 1853	Merope b. 1841	Voltaire br. 1826	Blacklock
Dam Flying Duchess b. 1853	Merope b. 1841	Voltaire br. 1826	Phantom Mare
Dam Flying Duchess b. 1853	Merope b. 1841	Juniper Mare br. 1817	Juniper
Dam Flying Duchess b. 1853	Merope b. 1841	Juniper Mare br. 1817	Sorcerer mare (Family 3-i)

* Galopin is inbred 3S x 2D to the stallion The Flying Dutchman, meaning that he appears third generation on the sire side of his pedigree and second generation on the dam side of his pedigree.

== See also ==
- List of leading Thoroughbred racehorses
