= Voltigeur (horse) =

British-bred Thoroughbred racehorse

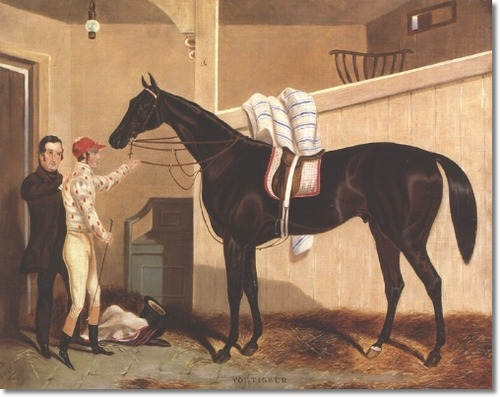
- Voltigeur in his stable, by William Barraud (1810-1850)
- Sire: Voltaire
- Grandsire: Blacklock
- Dam: Martha Lynn
- Damsire: Mulatto
- Sex: Stallion
- Foaled: 1847
- Died: 1874 (aged 26–27)
- Country: United Kingdom of Great Britain and Ireland
- Colour: Bay or Brown
- Breeder: Robert Stephenson
- Owner: Lord Zetland
- Trainer: Robert Hill
- Record: 10: 5-2-0

Major wins
- Epsom Derby (1850); St Leger (1850); Doncaster Cup (1850)

Honours
- Great Voltigeur Stakes

Voltigeur (1847–1874) was a British Thoroughbred racehorse and sire. In a career that lasted from 1849 to August 1852 he ran ten times and won five races. In 1850 he won The Derby and the St Leger against his fellow three-year-olds and then recorded his most famous victory when beating The Flying Dutchman in the Doncaster Cup. In May 1851 Voltigeur was beaten by The Flying Dutchman in what was probably the most celebrated match race in the history of British thoroughbred racing. Voltigeur was never as good again, winning once from his remaining five races, but went on to have a successful stud career.

== Background ==
Voltigeur, described in sources as being bay, brown or even black, was bred by Robert Stephenson at his stud at Hart, near Hartlepool, County Durham. He stood 15.3 hands (63 inches, 160 cm) high and was described as being "muscular" and "powerful" but having a rather coarse head and being rather "high on the leg". As a yearling he was sent to the sales, but was returned to his breeder after failing to attract any interest. Robert Hill, the private trainer for Lord Zetland was however, impressed by the colt and eventually persuaded the Earl to buy him the following autumn for £1,000. The sale arrangement provided for an extra £500 to be paid if the colt won the Derby. Hill took charge of training the colt at Aske, North Yorkshire.

Voltigeur's sire, Voltaire was a successful racehorse who won the Doncaster Cup in 1829. He went on to become a good stallion, with his best son apart from Voltigeur being the St Leger winner Charles the Twelfth. His dam Martha Lynn went on to produce the Yorkshire Oaks winner Vivandiere and was the grandam of the 1000 Guineas winner Imperieuse.

== Racing career ==
=== 1849: two-year-old season ===
Voltigeur ran once as a two-year-old, appearing in the Wright Stakes at Richmond, North Yorkshire on 31 October 1849. He looked impressive in the paddock and won well, beating Mark Tapley by a length.

=== 1850: three-year-old season ===
Although Voltigeur did not run in the spring of 1850 he was quietly fancied for the Epsom Derby with his support being particularly strong in Yorkshire where Zetland owned large estates and among the order of Freemasons of which he was a Grand Master. Shortly before the race, Zetland discovered that the colt's breeder had not made the correct entry payments and that it would cost £400 to run in the Derby. Zetland was determined to withdraw Voltigeur, but was persuaded to pay the entry fee after representations from his Yorkshire tenants, who explained that they had wagered heavily on the horse and faced ruin if he failed.

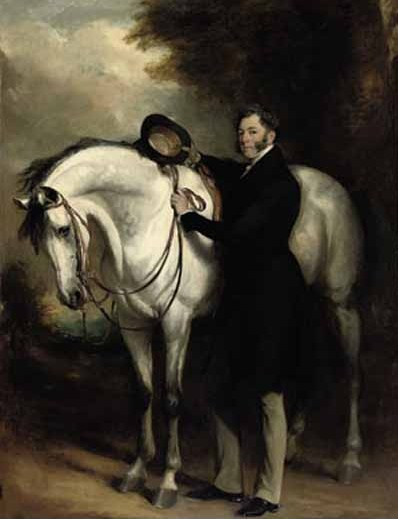
Lord Zetland, Voltigeur's owner, painted in 1841 by Francis Grant

Voltigeur performed poorly in an exercise gallop shortly after arriving at Epsom, and was allowed to start at odds of 16/1 in a field of twenty-four runners. The start of the race was delayed after an objection was lodged against one of the runners, Diecoon. In an echo of the "Running Rein" affair of five years' earlier, the horse was only cleared to run after a veterinary surgeon examined him and confirmed that he was a three-year-old. Ridden by Job Marson, Voltigeur was settled in seventh place in the early stages before making his challenge in the straight. Inside the final furlong (0.20 km), Voltigeur took the lead ahead of the favourite Clincher and ran on strongly to win comfortably by a length. The 2000 Guineas winner Pitsford finished well to take second from Clincher in the last strides.

In September, Voltigeur returned to Yorkshire for the St Leger at Doncaster. He started favourite at odds of 8/13 against seven rivals. In the early stages, he was badly hampered as the other jockeys attempted to “box” him in a "ruck" against the rails, and Marson decided to change tactics. Instead of holding the colt up for a late run, he took Voltigeur into the lead at the turn into the straight and attempted to win from the front. In the closing stages Voltigeur began to tire and was caught in the last strides by Russborough, despite being hard ridden by Marson who had to use his spurs on the favourite. The judge declared a dead-heat, and with the owners of the colts failing to reach an agreement to divide the stakes, the two colts had to race again over the same course later that afternoon. Hill had planned to rest Voltigeur in his stable before the rematch but was advised by John Scott that if he did so he "might as well shoot him through the head" as he would stiffen up. Hill therefore kept Voltigeur walking round until he was called out for the deciding heat. At the second attempt, Marson was able to ride a waiting race on Voltigeur, tracking Russborough before moving ahead inside the final furlong to win "cleverly" by a length. The win, described by the Liverpool Albion as "one of the most memorable on record", provoked scenes of enthusiastic and prolonged celebrations by the Yorkshire crowd. Having run almost four miles (6.4 km) in the course of the afternoon, Voltigeur appeared the following day, and walked over to take the prize money in the Scarborough Stakes, when no other horses opposed him.

Despite his exertions, he turned out two days later for the Doncaster Cup in which he was the only horse to oppose The Flying Dutchman, the winner of the 1849 Derby and St Leger and undefeated in thirteen career starts. The Flying Dutchman, whose jockey appeared to be the worse for drink, set off at an exceptionally fast pace and Marson was able to bide his time on Voltigeur. In the straight Voltigeur moved up alongside the four-year-old champion and then pulled ahead to win by half a length in a huge upset.

The race inspired a poem from "The Druid" (W. H. Dixon), which was printed in Bell's Life and culminated with the stanza:

The ring stands pale. Forth speeds the tale, which many a doubt inspires
From east to west, from north to south, it glances o'er the wires.
From Richmond unto Middleham this message quickly passed
Your conqueror of conquerors has bowed his head at last.

After the race it was agreed that the two horses would meet again in a match race at York the following spring for a prize of 2,000 guineas, with each owner putting up half the sum.

=== 1851: four-year-old season ===
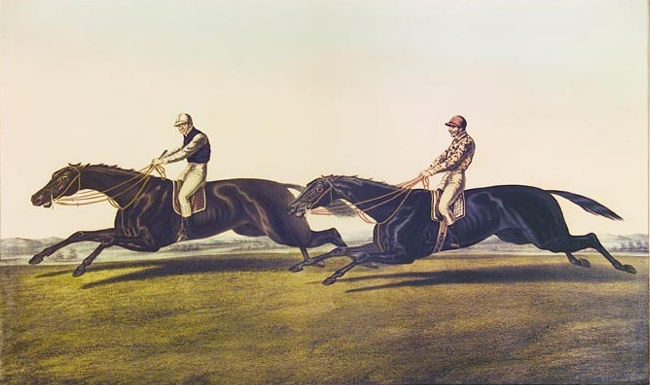
The Great Match by J F Herring: "Volti" is beaten by "The Flyer"

The two-mile race (3.2 km) was held as part of a renewed spring meeting at York on 13 May 1851. The weights for the match were set by Henry John Rous, who decided that The Flying Dutchman should carry 120 1/2 pounds (54.7 kg) to Voltigeur's 112 lb (51 kg). The race between the two Yorkshire-trained horses generated enormous public interest among all classes of society, even among those who normally took no interest in horse racing. The match drew an estimated 100,000 spectators, the largest crowd to the Knavesmire since the execution of Eugene Aram in 1759. According to a lengthy analysis of the race published in Bell's Life, previous great matches, such as the one at Newmarket between Hambletonian and Diamond in 1799, "fell into insignificance" in comparison with the York event. Even the horses' exercise gallops attracted large crowds of fans attempting to assess their relative condition. On the day of the race, the crowd was divided into partisan camps, cheering for either "Volti" or "The Flyer". Ridden by Nat Flatman, Voltigeur made the running, but although he held the lead into the straight, he was unable to dispose of his rival. In the final furlong, the Flatman dropped his whip, and The Flying Dutchman moved up level and then pulled ahead to win by a length.

The painting of the finish of the match by John F. Herring (right) became one of the most widely reproduced images of the time with "scarcely a village" in the British Empire being without at least one copy.

One day after his defeat, Voltigeur turned out for the York and Ainsty Hunt Cup over two miles (3.2 km), in which he was surprisingly beaten by a three-year-old filly named Nancy.

=== 1852: five-year-old season ===
Voltigeur was successful on his five-year-old debut on 20 April when he carried top weight of 125 pounds (57 kg) to victory a race at York named "The Flying Dutchman Handicap", proving himself "very game" by staying on under extreme pressure to win by a head. He started 7/4 favourite but finished only fifth at Ascot, behind Joe Miller in the Emperor of Russia's Plate, where he appeared less than fully fit and was unsuited by the soft, muddy ground. In the Ebor Handicap at York in August, he again carried top weight but was eased down when beaten and finished eighth behind Adine, a filly to whom he was conceding forty-six pounds. Despite looking leg-weary, he was sent out again later that same afternoon for Country Plate, a five-furlong (5 furlongs (1.0 km)) sprint race, in what The Sportsman described as a "strange" decision. He finished last of the five runners and never ran again.

== Assessment and honours ==
In May 1886 The Sporting Times carried out a poll of one hundred experts to create a ranking of the best British racehorses of the 19th century. Voltigeur was ranked thirtieth, having been placed in the top ten by eight of the contributors. He was the sixth-highest placed horse to have raced before 1850.

On Voltigeur's death in 1874 the Sheffield Telegraph called him "the pride of the Yorkshire sportsman, and one of the best and most popular horses that ever trod the British turf."

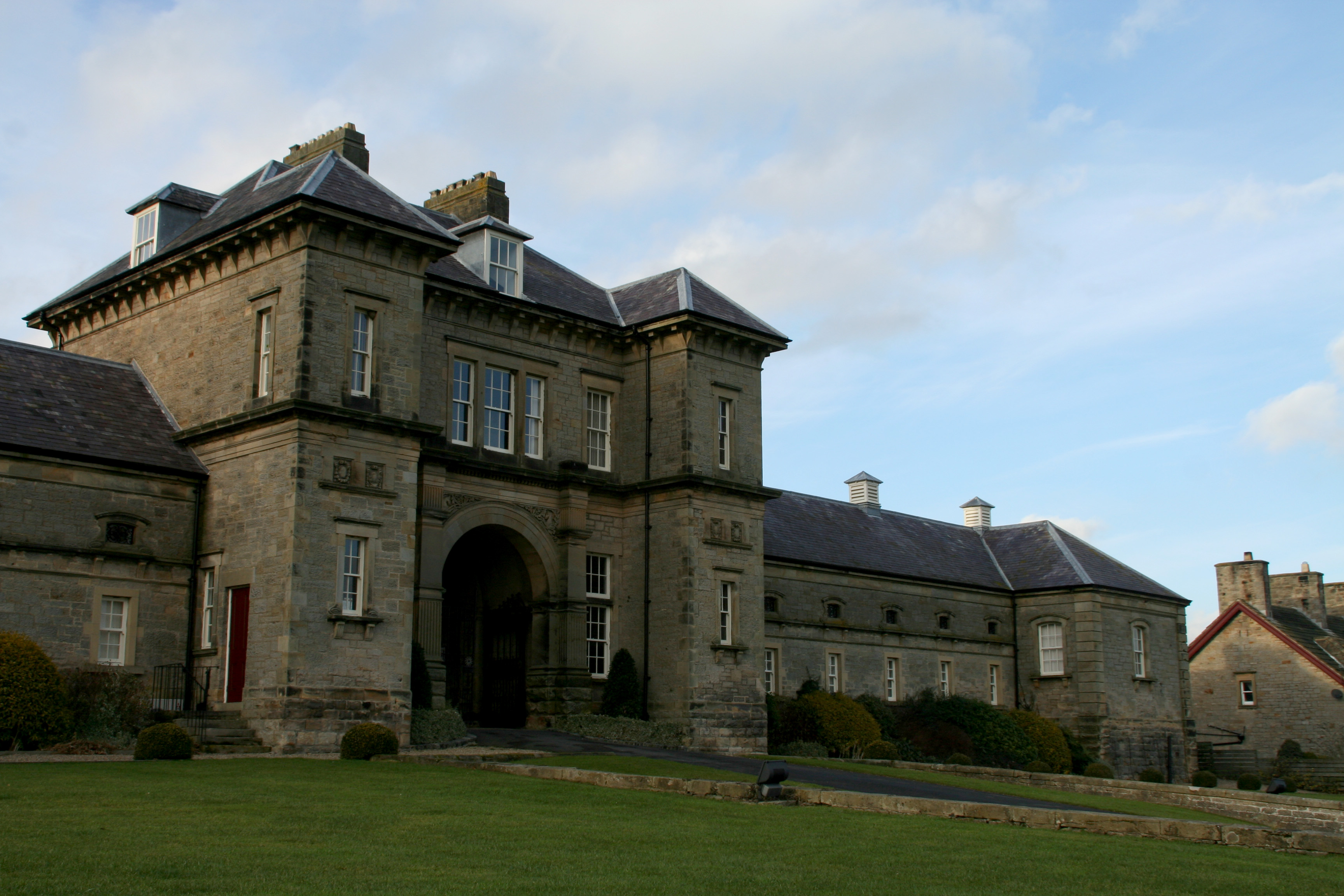
The stable block at Aske Hall, where Voltigeur spent his last years

When the racecourse authorities at York instituted a new trial race for the St Leger in 1950, the race was named the "Great Voltigeur Stakes" in his honour.

Voltigeur was the only racehorse painted by the famous animal painter Edwin Henry Landseer. Landseer's interest was reportedly engaged when he heard that Voltigeur was constantly accompanied by a tortoiseshell cat who slept on the horse's back.

== Stud career ==
Voltigeur initially stood as a stallion at Middlethorpe near York at a fee of 15 guineas. Voltigeur's most notable offspring was the 2000 Guineas winner Vedette, from his first crop of foals, who sired the Derby winner Galopin among other winners. Galopin sired the undefeated champion St Simon who became the dominant British stallion of his era.

At the age of twenty-seven Voltigeur sustained a fractured hind leg when he was kicked by a mare named Time Test. He was shot on 21 February 1874, and buried in the grounds of Aske Hall. His cannon bone however, was preserved and is still displayed in a glass cabinet at York Racecourse.

== Sire line tree ==
- Voltigeur
  - Skirmisher
    - Ripponden
      - Playfair
  - Vedette
    - Ashstead
      - Apollo
    - Speculum
      - Rosebery
        - Primrose
        - Dalmeny
        - Crowberry
        - Amphion
        - Middleham
        - Knight Of The Thistle
      - Castlereagh
        - Why Not
        - Clorane
      - Sefton
        - Aintree
        - Lourdes
      - Sans Pareil
      - Goggles
      - Hagioscope
        - Cotillon
        - Burnaby
        - Queen's Birthday
        - Lauriscope
        - Quaesitum
        - Lynchnoscope
        - Roughside
        - Flacon
        - Uncle Mac
        - Mirthful
      - Adanapaar
        - Times
      - Splendor
        - Jeweller
      - Almoner
      - Duncombe
      - Gloriation
    - Galopin
      - Fulmen
        - Impuls
      - Galliard
        - Gulliver
        - War Dance
        - Griffin
        - Beowulf
      - St Simon
        - St Andrew
        - St Serf
        - Adieu
        - Simonian
        - D'Arenberg
        - Quidnunc
        - St Damian
        - The Cellarer
        - Bill Of Portland
        - Childwick
        - Haut Brion
        - Raeburn
        - Soult
        - St Florian
        - Florizel II
        - Matchbox
        - St Aiden
        - Raconteur
        - St Bris
        - Persimmon
        - Phoebus Appolo
        - Positano
        - St Frusquin
        - Cyrenian
        - Desmond
        - Sandringham
        - Diamond Jubilee
        - Sidus
        - Lauzun
        - Pietermaritzburg
        - William The Third
        - Chaucer
        - Rabelais
        - Darley Dale
        - St Savin
        - Bright Steel
        - Juggernaut
        - St Girons
      - Grafton
      - Marmiton
      - Donovan
        - Matchmaker
        - Velasquez
        - O'Donovan Rossa
        - Veronese
      - Wild Monk
        - Easter Prize
      - Galeazzo
        - Glacier
        - Saturno
        - Prometeo
        - Flower Boy
        - Hamisi
        - Kibwesi
        - Kosheni
      - Galloping Lad
        - Cliftonhall
      - Disraeli
      - St Gris
        - Glenside
  - Sabreur
  - Bivouac
  - Virgilius
    - Double Zero
  - Buckstone
  - The Ranger
    - Uhlan
  - Tibthorpe
    - Woolsthorpe
      - Donau
  - Billet
    - Billet Doux
    - Volturno
    - Elias Lawrence
    - Runnymede
    - Barnes
    - Burton
    - Blue Wing
    - Belvidere
      - Belmar
      - Judge Parker
      - Salvidere
    - Ballston
    - Grey Dawn
    - Raceland
    - Sir Dixon
      - Alpen
      - Kilmarnock
      - Blues
      - Agile
    - Carroll
    - Newton

== Pedigree ==
Pedigree of Voltigeur (GB), brown stallion, 1847
| Sire Voltaire (GB) 1826 | Blacklock; 1814 | Whitelock | Hambletonian*^ |
| Sire Voltaire (GB) 1826 | Blacklock; 1814 | Whitelock | Rosalind |
| Sire Voltaire (GB) 1826 | Blacklock; 1814 | Coriander mare | Coriander |
| Sire Voltaire (GB) 1826 | Blacklock; 1814 | Coriander mare | Wildgoose |
| Sire Voltaire (GB) 1826 | Phantom mare 1816 | Phantom | Walton |
| Sire Voltaire (GB) 1826 | Phantom mare 1816 | Phantom | Julia |
| Sire Voltaire (GB) 1826 | Phantom mare 1816 | Overton mare | Overton |
| Sire Voltaire (GB) 1826 | Phantom mare 1816 | Overton mare | Walnut mare |
| Dam Martha Lynn (GB) 1837 | Mulatto; 1823 | Catton | Golumpus |
| Dam Martha Lynn (GB) 1837 | Mulatto; 1823 | Catton | Lucy Gray |
| Dam Martha Lynn (GB) 1837 | Mulatto; 1823 | Desdemona | Orville |
| Dam Martha Lynn (GB) 1837 | Mulatto; 1823 | Desdemona | Fanny |
| Dam Martha Lynn (GB) 1837 | Leda; 1824 | Filho da Puta | Haphazard |
| Dam Martha Lynn (GB) 1837 | Leda; 1824 | Filho da Puta | Mrs Barnet |
| Dam Martha Lynn (GB) 1837 | Leda; 1824 | Treasure | Camillus^ |
| Dam Martha Lynn (GB) 1837 | Leda; 1824 | Treasure | Hyacinthus mare (Family: 2-h) |

*^ Voltigeur is inbred 4S x 5D to the stallion Hambletonian, meaning that he appears fourth generation on the sire side of his pedigree and fifth generation (via Camillus)^ on the dam side of his pedigree.

== See also ==
- List of racehorses
