= St. Simon (horse) =

British-bred Thoroughbred racehorse

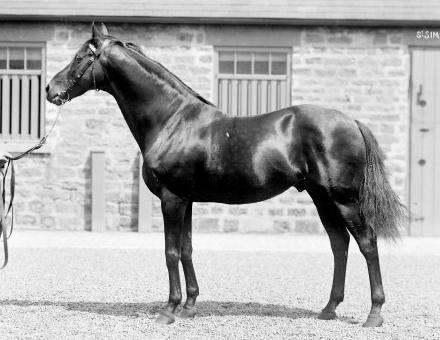
- Sire: Galopin
- Grandsire: Vedette
- Dam: St. Angela
- Damsire: King Tom
- Sex: Stallion
- Foaled: 1881
- Country: Great Britain
- Colour: Brown
- Breeder: Prince Gustavus Batthyany
- Owner: Duke of Portland
- Trainer: Mathew Dawson
- Record: 9:9-0-0
- Earnings: £4,676

Major wins
- Ascot Gold Cup (1884); Goodwood Cup (1884); Epsom Gold Cup (1884)

Awards
- Leading sire in Britain & Ireland (1890-1896 & 1900–1901); Leading broodmare sire in Britain & Ireland (1903–1907 & 1916)

Honours
- 1. 4 - Top 10 GB. Racehorses of the 19th Century St. Simon Stakes at Newbury
- Last updated on 20 July 2006

St. Simon (1881 – April 2, 1908) was an undefeated British Thoroughbred racehorse and one of the most successful sires in the history of the Thoroughbred. In May 1886 The Sporting Times carried out a poll of one hundred experts to create a ranking of the best British racehorses of the 19th century. St. Simon was ranked fourth, having been placed in the top ten by 53 of the contributors.

== Breeding ==
St. Simon was bred by Prince Gustavus Batthyany of Hungary and foaled at William Barrow's Paddocks near Newmarket. He was by Galopin, also owned by Batthyany, who won 10 out of 11 races including The Derby. Retired to stud in 1876, Galopin was not an immediate success, covering only 12 mares in his first crop. His stud fee dropped as low as 50 guineas before the success of first Galiard in the 1883 2000 Guineas and then St. Simon established his reputation. Galopin eventually became the leading sire in Great Britain and Ireland in 1888, 1889, and 1898.

St. Simon's dam, St. Angela (by King Tom), was disappointing as a broodmare up to the time she produced St. Simon, her sixth foal, at age 16. Her other notable progeny was a full-sister to St. Simon named Angelica, who later became the dam of champion and major stallion Orme (1889 by Ormonde).

== Conformation ==
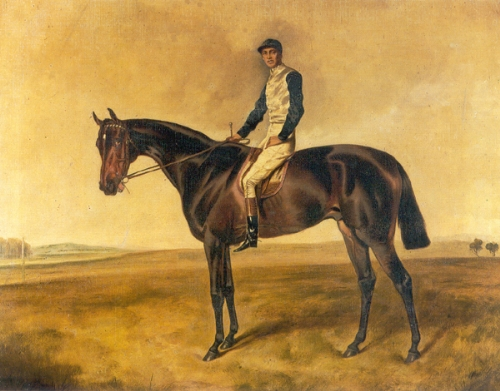
St. Simon with jockey up

St. Simon was a brown colt with a small star on his forehead and a few white hairs on the inside of his pasterns and heels. Almost all the foals he sired were bay or brown, with the exception of a gray filly (Tsu Shima) and a gray colt (Posthumus), both out of gray mares. His final height was 16 or 16.1 hands (65 inches, 165 cm) (sources differ), but his fine build made him look smaller. His offspring, especially his fillies, were usually slightly smaller than average. He had a fine head that was slightly dished, clean legs—although quite over at the knee—and a short back. He also had strong quarters and a very good shoulder, which according to the 1916 Bloodstock Breeders Review was "a study. So obliquely was [the shoulder] placed that it appeared to extend far into his back, making the latter look shorter." His girth was said to be 78 inches (2.0 m), and his cannon bone measured 8 1/2 inches (220 mm) around.

== Racing career ==
=== 1883: two-year-old season ===
Prince Batthyany died in May 1883 while attending the 2000 Guineas, won by his colt Galiard. This led to a dispersal sale of all his stock, at which St. Simon was purchased for 1,600 guineas by the 25-year-old Duke of Portland. Reportedly Batthyany's trainer John Dawson had painted the colt's hocks with a suspicious white substance, perhaps in an effort to discourage bidders. Mathew Dawson, John Dawson's brother, inspected the colt and was satisfied he was sound. St. Simon was moved to Dawson's Heath House stables at Newmarket.

The colt began his racing career under jockey Fred Archer at the five furlong Halnaker Stakes at Goodwood, winning by six lengths. The following day he won the six-furlong Maiden Plate (for which he was eligible because he was a maiden at the time of his entry) by a length, carrying 9 stone 7 pounds (133 lb). He then easily won a five-furlong race against Clochette and Fleta, the five-furlong Devonshire Nursery Plate (against 19 other horses), carrying 8 stone 12 pounds (124 lb) by two lengths at a canter, and the seven-furlong Princes of Wales's Nursery Plate (Doncaster) carrying 9 stone (130 lb; 57 kg) and winning by eight lengths against 21 other horses. St. Simon followed this by a win in a six furlong match against Duke of Richmond to end his two-year-old year considered the best of his age, despite not winning a major stakes race.

=== 1884: three-year-old season ===
St. Simon was prevented from running in the classics because the death of Prince Batthyany had invalidated his entries. His three-year-old career began with an unofficial trial race at Newmarket in which he was matched against the leading older horse Tristan at weight-for-age over one and a half miles at Newmarket. St. Simon won very easily by six lengths. St. Simon's first official race of the year was a walkover at the 10-furlong Epsom Gold Cup. He then won the 2½ mile Ascot Gold Cup by 20 lengths, despite having trailed in the beginning of the race, to beat Tristan and Faugh-a-Ballagh. He was so strong that it took almost a whole lap for his jockey to pull him up. In the one-mile Newcastle Gold Cup, he beat his only other competitor, Chiselhurst, by eight lengths, but suffered some damage due to the hard ground. He then defeated former St. Leger winner Ossian by 20 lengths in the 2½ mile Goodwood Cup. Later that year, St. Simon was worked in a set with three colts — The Lambkin (who would win that year's St. Leger), Scot Free (winner of that year's 2,000 Guineas) and Harvester (who had dead-heated in the Epsom Derby) — beating them all with ease.

The Newcastle Cup running caught up to him, producing serious leg problems. St. Simon was kept in training in 1885, and there were hopes of a meeting with the other leading colt of his generation St. Gatien. He did not recover, however, and never raced again, beginning his breeding career at the age of five.

== Stud record ==
St. Simon retired to stud in 1886 and sired 423 live foals, who between them won 571 races and more than half a million pounds in stake-money from 1889 through the first decade of the twentieth century. Among his progeny were 10 English Classic winners who won 17 classic races between them. The 10 Classic winners is the third-highest total of all time, behind Stockwell and Sadler's Wells, both with 12. The 17 Classic race wins by his offspring ties him for the all-time record with Stockwell. His classic winners were: Memoir, Semolina, La Fleche (horse), Mrs Butterwick, Amiable, Persimmon, St Frusquin, Diamond Jubilee, La Roche, and Winifreda. The latter three between them swept all five English Classics of 1900 — the only times a sire has accomplished this feat.

=== Notable progeny ===
St. Simon was the Leading sire in Great Britain & Ireland nine times. His notable progeny include:

- 1887: Memoir (Epsom Oaks, St Leger)
- 1887: Semolina (1,000 Guineas Stakes)
- 1887: Signorina (champion two-year-old filly)
- 1888: Simonian (Leading sire in France twice)
- 1889: La Fleche (Fillies' Triple Crown, Ascot Gold Cup, Champion Stakes, Cambridgeshire Handicap, 2nd Epsom Derby)
- 1890: Mrs Butterwick (Epsom Oaks)
- 1890: Soult (NZ Champion Sire five times)
- 1891: Amiable (1,000 Guineas, Epsom Oaks)
- 1891: Florizel II (St. James's Palace Stakes, Goodwood Cup, Jockey Club Cup, leading broodmare sire)
- 1893: Persimmon (Epsom Derby, St.Leger, Ascot Gold Cup, Champion Sire four times)
- 1893: St. Frusquin (2,000 Guineas, Eclipse Stakes, 2nd Epsom Derby, Champion Sire twice)
- 1896: Desmond (Champion Sire)
- 1897: Diamond Jubilee (Triple Crown, Eclipse Stakes, Argentina Champion Sire four times)
- 1897: La Roche (Epsom Oaks)
- 1897: Winifreda (1,000 Guineas)
- 1898: Pietermaritzburg (Jockey Club Stakes, Argentina Champion Sire)
- 1898: William the Third (Ascot Gold Cup, Doncaster Cup)
- 1900: Chaucer (two time leading broodmare sire. Selene, the dam of Hyperion, was by Chaucer, as was Scapa Flow, dam of Pharos and Fairway)
- 1900: Rabelais (Leading sire in France three times)

St. Simon was also the leading broodmare sire in Great Britain and Ireland six times. As a broodmare sire, his notable progeny include:

- Cheery, dam of Bromus, and granddam of Phalaris
- Concertina, dam of Plucky Liege, one of the most important broodmares of the 20th century
- Festa, dam of Febula, Fels and Fervor in Germany
- Ondulee, dam of highly influential broodmare Frizette
- Roquebrune, dam of Rock Sand
- Signorina, dam of Signorino, Signorinetta
- Simonath, dam of Flamboyant and granddam of Papyrus

St. Simon's sire line has continued to modern times through Rabelais down to Ribot, the two-time winner of the Arc de Triomphe and a major sire in England and the United States. Ribot left behind many successful sons to carry on the line, although the number of male-line descendants has dwindled in the 21st century. However, St. Simon is a pervasive influence in the breed through other lines of descent. For example, Nearco, inbred 5 x 4 × 4 × 5 to St. Simon, would found the most dominant Thoroughbred sire-line of the following century. Nearco's grandson Northern Dancer, another enormously influential sire, has fifteen crosses to St. Simon in the first eight generations of his pedigree. Pedigree expert Anne Peters refers to his bloodline as "one of the most widespread and omnipresent in the Thoroughbred gene pool today."

St. Simon died when he was 27 years old and his skeleton belongs to the British Museum of Natural History.

== Sire line tree ==
Descendants of St Simon (click to show)
- St Simon
  - St Andrew
    - St Jude
  - St Serf
    - Cavelry
    - Challacombe
  - Adieu
  - Simonian
    - Nuage
      - Gibtralter
      - Omen
      - Ordensjager
        - Patrizier
  - D'Arenberg
    - Marcellinus
  - Quidnunc
  - St Damian
    - St Julien
      - Chulo
        - Master Bob
    - Cheri
    - Burgrave
    - Lutteur
    - Or Duh Rhin
  - The Cellarer
    - The Oak
  - Bill Of Portland
    - Bobadil
      - The Parisian
    - Merriwee
    - Maltster
      - Alawa
      - Malt King
      - Popinjay
  - Childwick
    - General Symons
      - Sergeant Murphy
    - Negofol
      - Hourless
        - Mike Hall
        - Charley O
        - Horometer
      - Juveigneur
      - Tchad
      - Flechois
      - Coventry
        - Durango
      - Dangerous
      - Espino
        - Wait A Bit
        - Bounding Home
      - Bois De Rose
        - Cormac
          - Morning Mac
          - Burnmac
      - Vito
  - Haut Brion
  - Raeburn
    - Rascal
  - Soult
    - Master Soult
    - Wairiki
      - Chesterfield
    - Antagonist
      - Winter Wind
    - Beau Soult
      - Beauford
  - St Florian
    - Ard Patrick
      - Anklang
      - Huon
        - Billy Barton
        - Dolan
      - Lapis Lazuli
      - Marabou
      - Lucullus
        - Pompey
        - Master Doon
        - Glendowie
        - King Lu
      - Dolomit
      - Octopus
      - Ariel
        - Revolutionar
        - Monfalcone
      - Terminus
  - Florizel II
    - Doricles
      - Consols
        - Massine
      - Montmartin
    - Mackintosh
    - Volodyovski
    - Royal Arch
    - Vedas
    - Southannon
    - Fulmen
      - Leteo
        - Mineral
        - Puro Habano
    - Floreal
      - Tagor
        - Zator
        - Granit
    - Anmer
  - Matchbox
    - Con Amore
  - St Aiden
    - Moorside
      - Master Robert
  - Raconteur
    - Blagueur
  - St Bris
    - St Caradec
  - Persimmon
    - Out Of Reach
      - George Smith
    - Zinfandel
    - Royal Dream
      - Coq Gaulois
        - Coq Bruyere
        - Coq D'Espirit
    - Sea King
      - Paul Jones
    - Your Majesty
      - Agueros
      - Henry Lee
      - Quemao
    - Comedy King
      - Artilleryman
      - King Ingoda
    - Prince Palatine
      - Donnacona
      - Prince Galahad
        - Nothing Venture
      - Prince Pal
        - Mate
      - Rose Prince
        - Prince Rose
        - Mousson
  - Phoebus Appolo
    - Apologue
  - Positano
    - Lord Cardigan
    - Poseidon
      - Telecles
      - Rascasse
    - Lord Nolan
    - Piastre
  - St Frusquin
    - Fortunatus
      - Posinatus
    - St Alwyne
      - Night Watch
      - Poitrel
        - Belgamba
    - Barcadaile
      - Vermouth
    - Rydal Head
      - Poethlyn
    - St Amant
    - Frustrum
      - Ballyboggan
    - Martin Lightfoot
      - Impudent Barney
    - St Wolf
      - Florilegio
      - Cad
      - Diogenes
      - Hijo Mio
      - Movedizo
      - Lombardo
      - Maron
      - Tagore
    - Cipango
      - Tipperary Tim
    - Greenback
      - Paper Money
    - St Just
      - Jus D'Orange
        - Orange Peel
    - Pietri
    - St Anton
    - Lorenzo
    - Day Comet
      - Double Chance
    - Ecouen
    - St Cyr
  - Cyrenian
  - Desmond
    - Earla Mor
    - Tamasha
    - Shanid-A-Boo
    - Farasi
    - Land League
    - Machakos
    - The White Knight
    - Sir Archibald
      - Irish Elegance
    - Declare
    - Charles O'Malley
      - Light Dragoon
      - Legality
    - Demosthenes
      - Amythas
      - Gasbag
      - Statesman
    - Desman
      - Happy Man
    - Hall Cross
    - Lomond
      - Loch Lomond
        - Old Orkney
      - Clackmannon
      - Ben Lomond
      - Lacio
    - Aboyeur
    - Craganour
      - Caricato
      - Beun Ojo
    - Seremond
      - Mollison
    - Marchmond
      - Fanmond
    - Hapsburg
      - Francis Joseph
      - Noble Star
        - Hamstar
    - Stornoway
    - Atheling
    - Limond
      - Limosin
      - Mask
      - Commendation
      - Limerick
      - Veilmond
        - All Veil
        - Rimveil
        - Veiled Threat
        - Velocity
  - Sandringham
    - Royal Tourist
  - Diamond Jubilee
    - Bellerophon
    - Sancy
    - Queen's Advocate
    - Weber
    - Coup De Vent
    - As De Espadas
      - Pombiquet
    - Last Reason
      - Ardelion
      - Madrigal
    - Mustafa
      - Almodovar
      - Portos
      - Bombero
      - Urbion
    - Ricuarte
    - Smasher
    - Campanazo
      - Ripley
      - Sin Sabor
      - Sol Naciente
      - Samuray
      - Brown Price
    - Melik
    - Saca Chispas
    - Moloch
      - Caimican
      - Prinaldo
    - Mehemet Ali
  - Sidus
  - Lauzun
    - Melbourne
      - Agiato
    - Gros Papa
      - Roi Belge
      - Millonaire
  - Pietermaritzburg
    - Pioneer
    - Amsterdam
    - Brasil
    - Saint Marceaux
  - William The Third
    - Willonyx
    - King William
      - Holbeach
    - Sandal
      - Macon
    - Wrinkler
    - Rembrandt
    - Pilliwinkie
      - Olibrius
    - Beau Bill
      - Thrown In
    - Winkie
    - Nassovian
      - Nassau
  - Chaucer
    - Stedfast
      - The Night Patrol
        - Powerscourt
          - Comic Court
      - Musketoon
    - Donnithorne
    - Dan Russell
    - Dansellon
    - Prince Chimay
      - Vatout
        - Domaha
          - Knock Hard
        - Bois Roussel
        - Vatellor
          - Pearl Diver
          - My Love
          - Le Filou
            - Red Handed
            - Big Philou
          - Vamos
            - Vamour
          - Vattel
          - Mr Lee
            - Bounce
        - Antonym
          - Narvik
        - Atout Maitre
        - King Of Trumps
          - Conte Biancamano
    - Donzelon
    - Lord Chaucer
    - Rattlin' The Reefer
  - Rabelais
    - Jacobi
      - Nouvel An
        - Empressor
    - Verdun
      - Soldat De Verdun
      - Barranquero
    - Long Set
    - Rire Aux Larmes
      - Losir
      - Take My Tip
    - Durbar
      - Scaramouche
        - Pantalon
      - Altay
      - Xander
      - Bathorse
      - Indian Salute
    - Munibe
    - Haki
    - Lord Loris
    - Naturalist
    - Havresac
      - Manistee
      - Lui
      - Dervio
      - Cavaliere d'Arpino
        - Bellini
        - Trau
        - Traghetto
    - Radames
      - Motrico
        - Hahnhof
    - Pendennis
    - Ramus
    - Biribi
      - Birikil
      - Labrador
      - Le Pacha
        - Marco Polo
    - Rialto
      - Saranak
      - Sanguinetto
      - Hern The Hunter
      - Eros
      - Wild Risk
        - Worden
        - Fort National
        - Mon Capitaine
        - Vimy
        - Fils D'Eve
        - Balto
        - Le Fabuleux
        - Waldmeister
      - Houdon
      - Rabirius
    - Fenimore Cooper
      - Hunting Ground
  - Darley Dale
  - St Savin
    - St Charlcote
  - Bright Steel
    - Westcourt
  - Juggernaut
  - St Girons
    - Patron Saint

== Pedigree ==
Pedigree of St Simon (11-c), brown horse, 1881
Sire Galopin 1872	Vedette; 1854	Voltigeur	Voltaire*
Sire Galopin 1872	Vedette; 1854	Voltigeur	Martha Lynn
Sire Galopin 1872	Vedette; 1854	Mrs Ridgway	Birdcatcher
Sire Galopin 1872	Vedette; 1854	Mrs Ridgway	Nan Darrel
Sire Galopin 1872	Flying Duchess; 1853	The Flying Dutchman	Bay Middleton
Sire Galopin 1872	Flying Duchess; 1853	The Flying Dutchman	Barbell
Sire Galopin 1872	Flying Duchess; 1853	Merope	Voltaire*
Sire Galopin 1872	Flying Duchess; 1853	Merope	Velocidede's Dam
Dam St Angela 1865	King Tom; 1851	Harkaway	Economist
Dam St Angela 1865	King Tom; 1851	Harkaway	Fanny Dawson
Dam St Angela 1865	King Tom; 1851	Pocahontas	Glencoe
Dam St Angela 1865	King Tom; 1851	Pocahontas	Marpessa
Dam St Angela 1865	Adeline; 1851	Ion	Cain
Dam St Angela 1865	Adeline; 1851	Ion	Margaret
Dam St Angela 1865	Adeline; 1851	Little Fairy	Hornsea
Dam St Angela 1865	Adeline; 1851	Little Fairy	Lacerta (F-No.11-c)

* St Simon is inbred 4S x 4S to the stallion Voltaire, meaning that he appears fourth generation twice on the sire side of his pedigree.

== See also ==
- List of leading Thoroughbred racehorses
- List of racehorses
