= Voltaire (racehorse) =

British-bred Thoroughbred racehorse

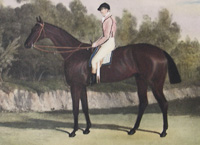
- Painting of Voltaire, with his jockey wearing the colours of the Marquess of Cleveland.
- Sire: Blacklock
- Grandsire: Whitelock
- Dam: Phantom mare
- Damsire: Phantom
- Sex: Stallion
- Foaled: 1826
- Country: Great Britain
- Colour: Brown
- Breeder: Robert Stephenson
- Owner: Robert Stephenson; Marquess of Cleveland
- Trainer: J. Smith
- Record: 6: 5-1-0

Major wins
- The Shorts (1828); Gascoigne Stakes (1828); Doncaster Gold Cup (1828)

Voltaire (1826 – 16 April 1848) was a British Thoroughbred racehorse. He won five of his six races, including the Doncaster Gold Cup in 1828. After retiring from racing he became a successful stallion, siring St. Leger winner Charles the Twelfth and Voltigeur, who won both The Derby and the St. Leger. He was bred and owned by Robert Stephenson, before being sold to William Vane, Marquess of Cleveland, whom he raced for as a three-year-old.

== Background ==
Voltaire was a brown colt bred by Robert Stephenson and foaled in 1826. He was sired by Blacklock, who won seventeen races including three Great Subscription Purses. Blacklock was also a successful stallion and was the leading sire in Great Britain and Ireland in 1829. Amongst his other progeny were York St. Leger winner Velocipede and Doncaster Gold Cup winner Laurel. Voltaire was the fifth foal of his dam, an unnamed daughter of Epsom Derby winner Phantom.

== Racing career ==
=== 1828: Two-year-old season ===
Voltaire made his debut on 9 April 1828 at Catterick Bridge, when he beat four rivals to win the Richmond Club Stakes. His only other start as a two-year-old came in July in the Tyro Stakes at Newcastle, where he faced five opponents. Starting as the 6/4 favourite and ridden by Sim Templeman, he won the race from Zodiac. During the winter he was amongst the favourites for the 1829 St. Leger Stakes.

=== 1829: Three-year-old season ===
Voltaire's first race as a three-year-old was The Shorts, a Sweepstakes of 50 sovereigns each over one mile at York. He started at the 1/2 favourite and ridden by J. Day, he won the race from Penhill, with Elastic finishing in third place. He was one on nineteen horses to contest the St. Leger Stakes at Doncaster in August. Rowton started the race as the favourite, with Frederick and Voltaire next at 4/1. Ridden by William Scott, Rowton took the lead a long way from the finish. Voltaire closed on the leader, but was still some distance behind as they entered the final furlong. Voltaire steadily closed on Rowton, who was being hard ridden, but could only finish second, a neck behind Rowton. Sir Hercules was third, with Felt finishing in fourth.

Two days later Voltaire walked over for the Gascoigne Stakes, ran over the same course and distance as the St. Leger. Later in the day had his final race in the Doncaster Gold Cup, ran over two miles and five furlongs. Voltaire and the previous year's winner Laurel started the race at similar prices in the betting. Granby led the field at the start, until he was overtaken by Laurel, who was closely followed by Voltaire. The two raced together until Voltaire was asked to quicken by jockey Thomas Lye, when he pulled out a slight lead and won easily by half a length. Laurel finished the race in second place and Fleur de Lis in third. Voltaire was kept in training as a four-year-old, but never raced. This was due to a leg injury he sustained in the Gold Cup.

== Stud career ==
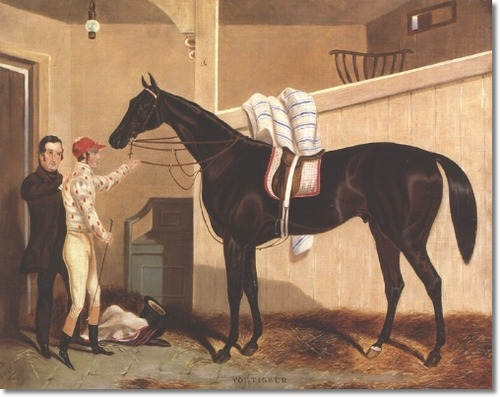
Voltaire's son Voltigeur

In 1832 Voltaire stood as a stallion at Boroughbridge in Yorkshire for a fee of 10 sovereigns. By 1841 he was standing at an increased fee of 16 guineas.

His most notable progeny were:

- Charles the Twelfth (1836) – won the St. Leger and two Goodwood Cups. He didn't have much success as a sire, but did produce Grand National winner Little Charley.
- Lollypop (1836) – was the dam of Doncaster Cup winner Sweetmeat.
- Vivandiere (1838) – won the Yorkshire Oaks and foaled Cantine, who won the Coronation Stakes and Nassau Stakes.
- Yorkshire Lady (1839) – won the Stewards' Cup.
- Merope (1841) – finished second in both the 1000 Guineas and Oaks in 1844. She was the dam of Flying Duchess who foaled Derby winner and important sire Galopin.
- Prussic Acid (1843) – won the Trial Stakes.
- Voltigeur (1847) – won The Derby, St. Leger and Doncaster Cup in 1850. As a sire he produced 2000 Guineas winner Vedette and two Ascot Gold Cup winners in Buckstone and Skirmisher.

Voltaire died on 16 April 1848 at Hart in County Durham. Voltigeur's son Vedette sired Galopin (Voltaire therefore appearing twice in the third generation of his pedigree), who sired the undefeated St Simon. It is mainly through St. Simon that Voltaire's sire line survives today.

== Sire line tree ==
- Voltaire
  - Harpurley
  - Picaroon
  - Charles the Twelfth
    - Fire Eater
      - Salamander
    - Little Charley
  - Jack Sheppard
  - Yorkshire Lad
  - Foxberry
  - Barnton
    - Fandango
  - Voltigeur
    - Skirmisher
      - Ripponden
        - Playfair
    - Vedette
      - Ashstead
        - Apollo
      - Speculum
        - Rosebery
        - Castlereagh
        - Sefton
        - Sans Pareil
        - Goggles
        - Hagioscope
        - Adanapaar
        - Splendor
        - Almoner
        - Duncombe
        - Gloriation
      - Galopin
        - Fulmen
        - Galliard
        - St Simon
        - Grafton
        - Marmiton
        - Donovan
        - Wild Monk
        - Galeazzo
        - Galloping Lad
        - Disraeli
        - St Gris
    - Bivouac
    - Sabreur
    - Virgilius
      - Double Zero
    - Buckstone
    - The Ranger
      - Uhlan
    - Tibthorpe
      - Woolsthorpe
        - Donau
    - Billet
      - Billet Doux
      - Volturno
      - Elias Lawrence
      - Runnymede
      - Barnes
      - Burton
      - Blue Wing
      - Belvidere
        - Belmar
        - Judge Parker
        - Salvidere
      - Ballston
      - Grey Dawn
      - Raceland
      - Sir Dixon
        - Alpen
        - Kilmarnock
        - Blues
        - Agile
      - Carroll
      - Newton

== Pedigree ==
Pedigree of Voltaire, brown stallion, 1826
Sire Blacklock (GB) b. 1814	Whitelock (GB) b. 1803	Hambletonian b. 1792	King Fergus*
Sire Blacklock (GB) b. 1814	Whitelock (GB) b. 1803	Hambletonian b. 1792	Grey Highflyer*^
Sire Blacklock (GB) b. 1814	Whitelock (GB) b. 1803	Rosalind ch. 1788	Phoenomenon
Sire Blacklock (GB) b. 1814	Whitelock (GB) b. 1803	Rosalind ch. 1788	Atalanta
Sire Blacklock (GB) b. 1814	Coriander mare (GB); 1799	Coriander b. 1786	Potoooooooo*
Sire Blacklock (GB) b. 1814	Coriander mare (GB); 1799	Coriander b. 1786	Lavender
Sire Blacklock (GB) b. 1814	Coriander mare (GB); 1799	Wildgoose br. 1792	Highflyer*
Sire Blacklock (GB) b. 1814	Coriander mare (GB); 1799	Wildgoose br. 1792	Coheiress*^
Dam Phantom mare (GB) b. 1816	Phantom (GB) b. 1808	Walton b. 1799	Sir Peter Teazle*^
Dam Phantom mare (GB) b. 1816	Phantom (GB) b. 1808	Walton b. 1799	Arethusa
Dam Phantom mare (GB) b. 1816	Phantom (GB) b. 1808	Julia br. 1799	Whiskey
Dam Phantom mare (GB) b. 1816	Phantom (GB) b. 1808	Julia br. 1799	Young Giantess
Dam Phantom mare (GB) b. 1816	Overton mare (GB) b. 1802	Overton; 1788	King Fergus*
Dam Phantom mare (GB) b. 1816	Overton mare (GB) b. 1802	Overton; 1788	Herod mare
Dam Phantom mare (GB) b. 1816	Overton mare (GB) b. 1802	Walnut mare 1796	Walnut*^
Dam Phantom mare (GB) b. 1816	Overton mare (GB) b. 1802	Walnut mare 1796	Ruler mare

* Voltaire is inbred 4S x 4D to the stallion King Fergus, meaning that he appears fourth generation on the sire side of his pedigree and fourth generation on the dam side of his pedigree.

*^ Voltaire is inbred 5S x 4S x 5D x 5D to the stallion Highflyer, meaning that he appears fifth generation (via Grey Highflyer)^ and fourth generation on the sire side of his pedigree and fifth generation twice (via Sir Peter Teazle and Walnut)^ on the dam side of his pedigree.

*^ Voltaire is inbred 4S x 5S to the stallion Potoooooooo, meaning that he appears fourth generation and fifth generation (via Coheiress)^ on the sire side of his pedigree.

== See also ==
- List of leading Thoroughbred racehorses
- List of racehorses
