= Vedas (horse) =

British-bred Thoroughbred racehorse

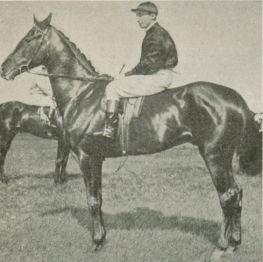
- Vedas in 1905
- Sire: Florizel II
- Grandsire: St Simon
- Dam: Agnostic
- Damsire: Rosicrucian
- Sex: Stallion
- Foaled: 1902
- Country: United Kingdom
- Colour: Brown
- Breeder: Valerie, Lady Meux
- Owner: West Fenton de Wend-Fenton
- Trainer: William Thomas "Jack" Robinson
- Record: 14: 8-2-1
- Earnings: £9,089

Major wins
- Brocklesby Stakes (1904); Sandown Park Stud Produce Stakes (1904); Molecomb Stakes (1904); 2000 Guineas (1905)

Vedas (1902 – 1906) was a British Thoroughbred racehorse. As a two-year-old in 1904 he was highly tried and won six of his ten races including the Brocklesby Stakes and Molecomb Stakes as well as being placed in the Coventry Stakes and Gimcrack Stakes. In the following spring he recorded his biggest win in the 2000 Guineas but was injured shortly afterwards and failed on his only subsequent start. He was reported to have died in early 1906.

== Background ==
Vedas was a brown horse bred by Valerie, Lady Meux and owned during his racing career by West Fenton de Wend-Fenton. The colt was sent into training with William Thomas "Jack" Robinson at his Foxhill stables in Wiltshire.

He was sired by Florizel II, a full-brother to both Diamond Jubilee and Persimmon and a top-class performer in own right, with wins including the Goodwood Cup, Jockey Club Cup and Ascot Gold Vase. As a breeding stallion he sired Volodyovski and Doricles and was the damsire of St Louis. Vedas' dam Agnostic, a half-sister of the Epsom Oaks winner Bonny Jean, also produced Gemma (also by Florizel II) who in turn produced Sardanapale.

== Racing career ==
=== 1904: two-year-old season ===
Vedas began his racing career in the Brocklesby Stakes over five furlongs at Lincoln Racecourse on 23 March in which he was made the 2/1 favourite and led from the start to win by four lengths from Captain Jack. In the following month, he won again, taking the Sefton Park Plate at Liverpool at odds of 2/5, but on this occasion he was eased down by his jockey in the final strides and was almost caught on the line by the filly Princess Sagan. At the end of April, the colt started joint-favourite for the Sandown Park Stud Produce Stakes and won "easily" by three lengths from Norman Bride. In May, he extended his winning run when he successfully conceded thirteen pounds to the highly regarded filly Queen of the Earth in the Spring Two-Year-Old Plate at Kempton Park Racecourse.

In June, Vedas started 11/10 favourite for the Coventry Stakes at Royal Ascot but sustained his first defeat as he was beaten two lengths into second by Lord Rosebery's colt Cicero. At the time, many of Jack Robinson's trainees were suffering from Equine influenza, and it was suggested that Vedas may have been affected. Vedas returned to the track in July and won the Royal Plate over five furlongs at Windsor Racecourse. On 5 August, Vedas contested the Molecomb Stakes over five furlongs at Goodwood Racecourse in which he was ridden by G McCall and started the 8/15 favourite. He led from the start and won "as he liked" by two lengths from Standen. At York Racecourse in August, the colt started favourite against thirteen opponents for the Gimcrack Stakes but finished third behind a filly named Desiree. On his penultimate appearance of the season, he was assigned top weight (alongside Polymelus) in the Imperial Produce Stakes at Kempton in October and finished unplaced behind Khammurabi. Vedas ended the year with a narrow defeat, again under top weight, in the Chesterfield Nursery Plate at Derby Racecourse.

Vedas earned a total of £3,939 in 1904.

=== 1905: three-year-old season ===
Vedas began his second season by finishing unplaced in the Lincolnshire Handicap over one mile in March. In April he was an easy winner of the Bickerstaffe Stakes at Liverpool. On 3 May 1905, ridden by Herbert Jones, Vedas started at odds of 11/2 for the 97th running of the 2000 Guineas over the Rowley Mile course at Newmarket. His twelve opponents included the Dewhurst Stakes winner Rouge Croix, who started favourite, Llangibby (New Stakes), Plum Centre and Signorino (runner-up in the Middle Park Stakes). Racing on heavy ground Vedas tracked the leaders as the outsider Brother Bill set the pace before moving up to take the lead approaching the final furlong. He went four lengths clear of his rivals and despite tiring in the final strides he prevailed by two lengths from Signorino with Llangibby a head away in third. The result provided an unusual coincidence concerning the number "13": Vedas, on his thirteenth start, was number 13 on the racecard, and drawn number thirteen in thirteen-runner field, while the numbers in his starting price (11/2) totalled 13; his win came 13 years after his trainer rode Bona Vista to victory in the race.

Vedas was strongly fancied for the Epsom Derby but was found to be lame a few days before the race and was withdrawn from the contest. After a lengthy break he returned in the Gratwicke Stakes over one and a half miles but failed to reproduce his earlier form and was well-beaten in a race won by Polymelus. Towards the end of the year Vedas's owner, Mr West Fenton de-Wend Fenton was "warned-off" (banned from any involvement in horse racing) by the Jockey Club after riding his own horse to defeat in a match race at Sandown which involved highly suspicious betting patterns.

Vedas earned £5,150 in 1905.

=== 1906: four-year-old season ===
Vedas remained in training as a four-year-old but in April it was announced that he had "broken down badly" and would not race again. He was reported dead shortly afterwards.

== Assessment and honours ==
In their book, A Century of Champions, based on the Timeform rating system, John Randall and Tony Morris rated Vedas an "inferior" winner of the 2000 Guineas.

== Pedigree ==
Pedigree of Vedas (GB), brown stallion, 1902
| Sire Florizel II (GB) 1891 | St Simon (GB); 1881 | Galopin | Vedette |
| Sire Florizel II (GB) 1891 | St Simon (GB); 1881 | Galopin | Flying Duchess |
| Sire Florizel II (GB) 1891 | St Simon (GB); 1881 | St Angela | King Tom |
| Sire Florizel II (GB) 1891 | St Simon (GB); 1881 | St Angela | Adeline |
| Sire Florizel II (GB) 1891 | Perdita (GB); 1881 | Hampton | Lord Clifden |
| Sire Florizel II (GB) 1891 | Perdita (GB); 1881 | Hampton | Lady Langden |
| Sire Florizel II (GB) 1891 | Perdita (GB); 1881 | Hermione | Young Melbourne |
| Sire Florizel II (GB) 1891 | Perdita (GB); 1881 | Hermione | La Belle Helene |
| Dam Agnostic (GB) 1884 | Rosicucian (GB); 1865 | Beadsman | Weatherbit |
| Dam Agnostic (GB) 1884 | Rosicucian (GB); 1865 | Beadsman | Mendicant |
| Dam Agnostic (GB) 1884 | Rosicucian (GB); 1865 | Madame Eglentine | Cowl |
| Dam Agnostic (GB) 1884 | Rosicucian (GB); 1865 | Madame Eglentine | Diversion |
| Dam Agnostic (GB) 1884 | Bonnie Agnes (GB); 1875 | Blair Athol | Stockwell |
| Dam Agnostic (GB) 1884 | Bonnie Agnes (GB); 1875 | Blair Athol | Blink Bonny |
| Dam Agnostic (GB) 1884 | Bonnie Agnes (GB); 1875 | Little Agnes | The Cure |
| Dam Agnostic (GB) 1884 | Bonnie Agnes (GB); 1875 | Little Agnes | Miss Agnes (Family 16-c) |
