= Patron Saint (horse) =

British-bred Thoroughbred racehorse

- Sire: St Girons
- Grandsire: St Simon
- Dam: VMC
- Damsire: Common
- Sex: Gelding
- Foaled: 1923
- Country: United Kingdom
- Colour: Bay
- Owner: F W Keen
- Trainer: Stanley Harrison

Major wins
- Cheltenham Gold Cup (1928)

Patron Saint (foaled 1923) was a British racehorse who won the 1928 Cheltenham Gold Cup.

== Background ==
Patron Saint was a bay gelding bred in the United Kingdom. He was sired by St Girons (a son of St Simon) who also sired the Grand Sefton Steeplechase winner Inversible. Patron Saint's dam VCB was a distant descendant of Canezou, who won the 1000 Guineas in 1848 and later became an influential broodmare.

During his racing career Patron Saint was owned by F W Keen and was trained near Bangor-on-Dee in Wales by Stanley Harrison.

== Racing career ==
The early spring of 1928 was exceptionally cold and led to fears that the Cheltenham Festival would be abandoned but a break in the weather allowed the meeting to take place. Patron Saint was entered in the Gold Cup as a five-year-old meaning that he carried seven pounds less than his older rivals. With the leading chaser of the season Easter Hero absent, the 1926 Gold Cup winner Koko started the 4/5 favourite ahead of Patron Saint on 7/2 whilst the most notable of the other five runners was the 1927 Grand National winner Sprig. Ridden by Dick Rees, Patron Saint tracked Koko before being driven up on the inside to take a slight lead at the final fence. Koko still looked the more likely winner but broke a blood vessel and dropped back to third, allowing Patron Saint to draw clear and win by four lengths from the thirteen-year-old veteran Vive. On his next start Patron Saint finished third on a flat race in which he was ridden by Noel Murless, later to become a leading trainer.

Patron Saint was expected to defend his Gold Cup title in 1929 but missed the race after suffering a series of injuries and training problems. He returned in 1930 and won the Plodders Chase at Nottingham Racecourse, but had no further success.

== Assessment and honours ==
In their book, A Century of Champions, based on the Timeform rating system, John Randall and Tony Morris rated Patron Saint a "poor" Gold Cup winner.

== Pedigree ==
Pedigree of Patron Saint (GB), bay gelding, 1923
Sire St Girons (GB) 1908	St Simon (GB); 1881	Galopin*^	Vedette
Sire St Girons (GB) 1908	St Simon (GB); 1881	Galopin*^	St Angela
Sire St Girons (GB) 1908	St Simon (GB); 1881	St Angela	King Tom*^
Sire St Girons (GB) 1908	St Simon (GB); 1881	St Angela	Adeline
Sire St Girons (GB) 1908	Acunha (GB); 1894	Tristan	Hermit
Sire St Girons (GB) 1908	Acunha (GB); 1894	Tristan	Thrift
Sire St Girons (GB) 1908	Acunha (GB); 1894	Polenta	Coltness^
Sire St Girons (GB) 1908	Acunha (GB); 1894	Polenta	Modena
Dam VMC (GB) 1911	Common* (GB); 1888	Isonomy	Sterling
Dam VMC (GB) 1911	Common* (GB); 1888	Isonomy	Isola Bella
Dam VMC (GB) 1911	Common* (GB); 1888	Thistle	Scottish Chief
Dam VMC (GB) 1911	Common* (GB); 1888	Thistle	The Flower Safety
Dam VMC (GB) 1911	Hoot (GB); 1906	The Owl	Wisdom
Dam VMC (GB) 1911	Hoot (GB); 1906	The Owl	Rattlewings^
Dam VMC (GB) 1911	Hoot (GB); 1906	Graceless	Common*
Dam VMC (GB) 1911	Hoot (GB); 1906	Graceless	Grace Emily (Family 31)

* Patron Saint is inbred 2D x 4D to the stallion Common, meaning that he appears second generation and fourth generation on the dam side of his pedigree.

*^ Patron Saint is inbred 3S x 5D to the stallion Galopin, meaning that he appears third generation on the sire side of his pedigree and fifth generation (via Rattlewings)^ on the dam side of his pedigree.

*^ Patron Saint is inbred 4S x 5S to the stallion King Tom, meaning that he appears fourth generation and fifth generation (via Coltness)^ on the sire side of his pedigree.
