= The Flying Dutchman (horse) =

English thoroughbred racehorse

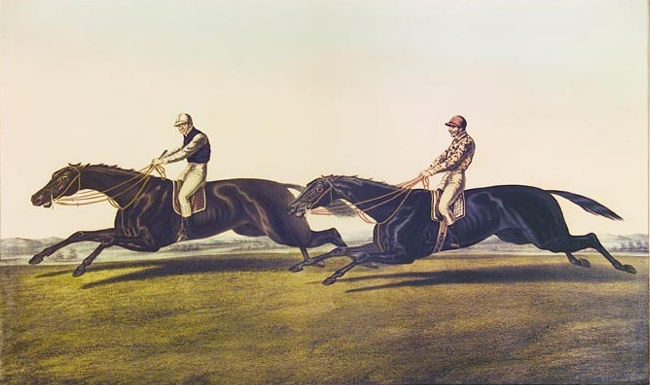
- The match race between The Flying Dutchman and Voltigeur
- Sire: Bay Middleton
- Grandsire: Sultan
- Dam: Barbelle
- Damsire: Sandbeck
- Sex: Stallion
- Foaled: 27 February 1846
- Country: United Kingdom of Great Britain and Ireland
- Colour: Brown
- Breeder: Henry Vansittart
- Owner: Archibald Montgomerie, 13th Earl of Eglinton
- Trainer: John Fobert
- Record: 16: 15-1-0
- Earnings: £6,575

Major wins
- July Stakes (1848); Champagne Stakes (1848); Epsom Derby (1849); St. Leger Stakes (1849); Ascot Gold Cup (1850); Match with Voltigeur (1851)
- Last updated on 15 May 2009

The Flying Dutchman (1846–1870) was an English Thoroughbred racehorse and sire. He raced for four seasons between 1848 and 1851, winning all but one of his fifteen races, including The Derby and the St Leger. On his final racecourse appearance, he defeated Voltigeur in a match race known as The Great Match. He went on to be a success at stud both in Britain and France, where he died in 1870. In an 1886 poll of experts by The Sporting Times, The Flying Dutchman was ranked the sixth-best British racehorse of the nineteenth century.

== Background ==
The Flying Dutchman, bred at Kirkleatham in Yorkshire, was a dark bay or "brown" horse standing 15.3 hands high. He had a strong back, deep shoulders, powerful hindquarters, good bone, and was a bit "over at the knee" (as were many of his offspring). He was described as having a long stride, a quiet temper, and a "fiery eye".

The Flying Dutchman was by Bay Middleton, who won every race in his two seasons on the turf until he was retired due to a problem with one of his forelegs. During that time, the colt won the Riddleton Stakes, the Bruton Street Stakes, the 2,000 Guineas, the Buckhust Stakes at Ascot, the Grand Duke Michael Stakes, The Derby (against Gladiator, Venison and Slane), and his final race, a match against and Muezzin. Bay Middleton was by Sultan, winner of the Derby, and out of The Oaks winning mare Cobweb. Bay Middleton also sired Aphrodite (winner of the 1,000 Guineas), The Hermit (2000 Guineas), Andover (Derby), and Fly By Night. As a broodmare-sire, he produced Ellen Middleton, and dams of Wild Dayrell, Saunterer, Mainstone, Sunbeam, and Mainbrace. He was the Leading sire in Great Britain and Ireland in 1844 and 1849.

The Flying Dutchman was out of the 15-hand mare Barbelle. She was by the stallion Sandbeck, who won the 1823 Club Stakes at Doncaster and 1824 York's Fitzwilliam Stakes, and produced the colt Redshank. Her other offspring included Van Tromp (by Lanercost), who was quite successful on the turf and at stud. His success led to Lord Eglinton's decision to agree to purchase any of her future foals £1,000. He thus became the owner of Barbelle's 1846 colt foal. The Flying Dutchman was sent into training with John Fobert at Middleham.

== Racing career ==
=== 1848: two-year-old season ===
The Flying Dutchman was undefeated in five races as a two-year-old in 1848. He won the July Stakes at Newmarket and a £400 Sweepstakes at the same course. At Liverpool he won a Sweepstakes for £1400. In autumn he appeared at Doncaster where he won the Champagne Stakes and one other race. His winnings for the season were £4,095.

=== 1849: three-year-old season ===
As a three-year-old, The Flying Dutchman did not race before The Derby and was rumoured to be less than fully fit. He nevertheless started joint-favourite with Tadmor for the race at odds of 2/1 in a field of twenty-six runners. Ridden by Charles Marlow he led after half a mile but was overtaken in the straight by the outsider Hotspur, who was travelling strongly in the havey, muddy ground. Marlow had to use the whip twice (the only time the whip was used on The Flying Dutchman in his career) to ensure that he regained the lead and won by half a length over, with Tadmor third. Lord Eglinton won heavily in betting on the race, and members of the Army and Navy Club ("The Rag") of which he was a member, reportedly took £30,000 in winning bets. John Fobert celebrated by holding a feast for a hundred poor families at Middleham. King William III of the Netherlands who was a great admirer of The Flying Dutchman, presented Fobert with a "magnificent breast-pin" in the shape of a horseshoe to commemorate the victory.

He had walk-overs when no rivals opposed him in his next two races, the Produce Stakes and the Bickerstaff Stakes, both at Liverpool. He returned on 12 September for the St Leger at Doncaster, in which he started 4/9 favourite against nine rivals. Although many of fashionable visitors were deterred by the poor weather, the race attracted a huge crowd, with many arriving by rail for the first time. The Flying Dutchman was held up in the early stages before making steady progress to turn into the straight in second place behind Vatican. The favourite took the lead a furlong from the finish and won very easily by two lengths in a time of 3:20.0 from the 2000 Guineas winner Nunnykirk who finished strongly to deprive Vatican of second. A few days later he had another walk-over in the Foal Stakes. He then won by forfeit, for £500, after Honeycomb (also by Bay Middleton) was withdrawn from a scheduled match race between the two: this win is not part of the Flying Dutchman's official race record. He finished the season with the Belvoir Stakes, winning by eight lengths.

=== 1850: four-year-old season ===
At four, The Flying Dutchman first won the two and a half mile Emperor of Russia's Plate by eight lengths at Royal Ascot in June. He then won the 29-furlong Goodwood Stakes for four-year-olds by 10 lengths in July.

It wasn't until the Doncaster Cup that he was defeated in a two-horse race, by the 1850 Derby winner Voltigeur who had won St. Leger two days before. It is possible that The Flying Dutchman's defeat was due to the fact that the horse was not properly conditioned, since his trainer had thought that Voltigeur would forfeit. Another factor was the behaviour of jockey, Marlow, who had been drinking and ignored instructions to wait on the colt, instead crying "Ill show you what I've got under me today!" and pushing him at break-neck speed at the beginning of the race. Having started the race at odds of 2/11, The Flying Dutchman's odds in running shortened to 1/10 as he pulled progressively further ahead of his rival. His stamina, however, was being used up and although he held the lead into the straight Voltigeur, receiving nineteen pounds, wore him down to win by half a length. It was decided to scrap the original plan of retiring The Flying Dutchman after the Doncaster, and instead run him in a match race against Voltigeur to try to regain his reputation.

=== 1851: five-year-old season ===
==== The Great Match ====
The two-mile race was held at York on 31 May 1851, for a purse of 1,000 sovereigns. The weights for the match were set by Henry John Rous, who decided that The Flying Dutchman should carry 120½ pounds to Voltigeur's 112. The race between the two Yorkshire horses generated enormous public interest, drawing an estimated 100,000 spectators, the largest crowd to the Knavesmire since the execution of Eugene Aram in 1759. Even the horses' exercise gallops attracted large crowds of fans attempting to assess their relative condition. On the day of the race the crowd was divided into partisan camps, cheering for either "Volti" or "The Flyer". The Flying Dutchman was successfully restrained in the early stages as Voltigeur made the running. In the final furlong the Flying Dutchman moved up level with his rival and then pulled ahead to win by a length. He was then retired to stud.

== Stud record ==
During his first few years at stud, The Flying Dutchman stood at Rawcliffe Paddocks, for a fee of 30 guineas. He was later sold in 1858, for a sum of 150,000 francs, to Napoleon III's National Stud and stood there until his death in 1870. In England, The Flying Dutchman produced very little of merit, despite covering a great number of mares for that time (50 mares in his first season). He was one of the top sires from 1855 to 1862, making it up to second place in 1860 and 1861 mainly due to his filly, Flying Duchess. During this time he also sired Derby winner Ellington, some good broodmares, and good jumping horses. In France, he sired Dollar, and many other top race horses, making his time there much more successful than his breeding career in England. Additionally, his blood was sent to Australia and New Zealand through granddaughter Mermaid.

=== Notable progeny ===
- Brown Duchess: 1858 filly, won the Two Year Old Stakes, the New Stakes, St. Helen's Purse, Liverpool Cup, Stanley Stakes, and Filly Stakes and placed in the Queen's Plate, Stamford Plate, and Two Year Old Plate as a two-year-old. At three, won the Epsom Oaks, Stanley Stakes, Yorkshire Oaks, Grand Duke Michael Stakes, and Queen's Plate, dead-heated in the Doncaster Cup, and was third in the One Thousand Guineas. Dam of Visionary (by Loup-garou), Noblesse, and Berggeist.
- Deliane: 1862 filly, won the French Oaks, dam of Enguerrande (dead-heated in Epsom Oaks, won the French One Thousand Guineas and the Prix de Villebon, second in the Grand Prix de Paris and the Prix du Jockey Club) and La Jonchere (won the Prix de Diane, the Prix Daru and the Prix des Cars), and Xaintrailles (won the Prendergast Stakes, the French Two Thousand Guineas, and the Grand Poule des Produits).
- Dollar: 1860 colt, won the Prix de la Société d'Encouragement (2,200 Metres), Prix Principal (4,000 Metres), the Grand Prix de l'Empereur (Prix Lupin), Grand Prix de l'Imperatrice (Prix Rainbow), the Brighton Cup, Great Northamptonshire Handicap, and Goodwood Cup, and ran second in the Prix du Jockey Club (French Derby). Record of 19: 8-5-3. Influential sire in France, with progeny including Sea Sick, Omnium II, Bruleur, Ksar (winner of the French Derby), Tourbillon (winner of the French Derby), Ossian (winner of St. Leger), Upas (French Derby), and Androclès.
- Dutch Skater: 1866 colt, a stayer, won the Warwick Cup, the Great Metropolitan Handicap, the Doncaster Cup, and the 6,200-metre Prix Gladiateur all at age six. His get include Insulaire (winner of the French Derby, Ascot Derby, Claret Stakes, Queen Alexandra Stakes; second in the Two Thousand Guineas, Epsom Derby, Grand Prix de Paris, Sussex Stakes, Newmarket St. Leger, Jockey Club Cup), the filly Dutch Oven (won 9 races at 2yo, and the Doncaster St. Leger, Yorkshire Oaks, and Great Foal Stakes at 3) and Yellow (won the Prix de L'Avenir, the Prix à Bade, the Grand Prix du Jubilee, the Biennial, the Prix Hocquart and the Prix de Fontainebleau; sired Grand Steeplechase de Paris winner Dandolo).
- Ellington: 1853 colt, only Epsom Derby winner that was sired by The Flying Dutchman. Was a poor sire, although a good show horse following his retirement from racing.
- Flying Duchess: 1853 filly, dam of the great racehorse and sire Galopin.
- Guildermire: 1855 filly, won the Champagne Stakes, placed in the Eglinton Stakes, dead-heated in the Oaks (but lost the run-off).
- Ignoramus: 1854 colt, won Prince of Wales's Stakes, third in Fitzwilliam Stakes, and won a number of plates.
- Pennace: 1857 filly, descendants include Ajax, Double Life, Precipitation, and Persian Gulf.
- Peter Wilkins: Exported to Australia where he was the damsire of the versatile Malua.

The Flying Dutchman's bloodline continues through his daughters, Flying Duchess and Dutchman's Daughter, to horses such as Galopin and Man o' War, and later racehorses including Secretariat, Ruffian, Affirmed, Barbaro, and Forego. All U.S. Triple Crown winners trace their pedigree back to The Flying Dutchman.

== Assessment ==
In May 1886 The Sporting Times carried out a poll of one hundred experts to create a ranking of the best British racehorses of the 19th century. The Flying Dutchman was ranked sixth, having been placed in the top ten by forty-nine of the contributors. He was the highest-placed horse to have raced before 1850.

== Sire line tree ==
- The Flying Dutchman
  - Ellington
    - Delight
      - Galopin
        - Fulmen
        - Galliard
        - St Simon
        - Grafton
        - Marmiton
        - Donovan
        - Wild Monk
        - Galeazzo
        - Galloping Lad
        - Disraeli
        - St Gris
    - Montgoubert
  - Fly-By-Night
  - Peter Wilkens
    - The Quack
    - Benvolio
  - Flying Pieman
    - Old England
      - New Holland
  - Ignoramus
    - Ignorant
  - Purston
    - Sir Watkin
      - Bide-A-Wee
  - Amsterdam
  - Duneany
  - Glenbuck
  - The Rover
  - Cape Flyaway
    - Good Hope
  - Tom Bowline
    - Make Haste
  - Winton
  - Young Dutchman
  - Ellerton
  - Romulus
  - Walloon
  - Dollar
    - Dami
    - Il Maestro
    - Salvanos
    - Androcles
      - Cambyse
        - Callistrate
        - Kosroes
        - Kerym
        - Gardefeu
        - Arbaces
        - Codoman
    - Saint Cyr
      - Pastisson
        - Xeny
    - Salvator
      - Elzevir
      - Ossian
    - Fountainebleau
      - Phlegathon
      - Jouancy
    - Patriarche
      - Gettatore
      - Lutin
        - Kadikoi
        - Hautbois
      - Beau Page
    - Thieusies
    - Greenback
    - Prologue
      - Vin Sec
    - Vignemale
      - Gil Peres
        - Aigle Royal
      - Merlin
        - Qui Vive
      - Caudeyran
    - Louis D'Or
    - Saumur
      - Clamart
    - Cimier
    - Garrick
      - Oranzeb
      - Marzio
      - Onorio
      - Ulpiano
    - Martin Pecheur
    - Sansonnet
      - Courlis
        - Brassac
      - Coq
    - The Condor
      - Tancarville
      - Cloridano
    - Saint Honore
    - Souci
    - Upas
      - Omnium II
        - Arizona
      - Elf
        - Marsan
        - Pitti
        - Sea Sick
        - Nimbus
        - Rural
      - Ivoire
    - Acheron
      - Massina
      - Atleta
      - Ranquel
    - Bocage
      - Ob
        - Kummel
    - Dauphin
      - Hero
      - Hareng
    - Cerbere
  - Tourmalet
  - Dutch Skater
    - Insulaire
      - Thomery
    - Burgomaster
    - Dutch Roller
    - Sherbrooke
    - Yellow
      - Daphnis
      - Dandolo
    - Accumulator
  - Massinissa
  - Jarnac
    - Old Tom

== Pedigree ==
Pedigree of The Flying Dutchman, dark bay or brown colt, 1846
Sire Bay Middleton b. or br. 1833	Sultan b. 1816	Selim* ch. 1802	Buzzard
Sire Bay Middleton b. or br. 1833	Sultan b. 1816	Selim* ch. 1802	Alexander mare (2-m) (1790)
Sire Bay Middleton b. or br. 1833	Sultan b. 1816	Bacchante br. 1809	Williamson's Ditto
Sire Bay Middleton b. or br. 1833	Sultan b. 1816	Bacchante br. 1809	Mercury mare (1791)
Sire Bay Middleton b. or br. 1833	Cobweb b. 1821	Phantom b. 1808	Walton
Sire Bay Middleton b. or br. 1833	Cobweb b. 1821	Phantom b. 1808	Julia
Sire Bay Middleton b. or br. 1833	Cobweb b. 1821	Filagree ch. 1815	Soothsayer
Sire Bay Middleton b. or br. 1833	Cobweb b. 1821	Filagree ch. 1815	Web
Dam Barbelle br. 1836	Sandbeck b. 1818	Catton br. 1809	Golumpus
Dam Barbelle br. 1836	Sandbeck b. 1818	Catton br. 1809	Lucy Grey
Dam Barbelle br. 1836	Sandbeck b. 1818	Orvillina b. 1804	Beningbrough
Dam Barbelle br. 1836	Sandbeck b. 1818	Orvillina b. 1804	Evelina
Dam Barbelle br. 1836	Darioletta br. 1822	Amadis br. 1807	Don Quixote
Dam Barbelle br. 1836	Darioletta br. 1822	Amadis br. 1807	Fanny
Dam Barbelle br. 1836	Darioletta br. 1822	Selima b. 1810	Selim*
Dam Barbelle br. 1836	Darioletta br. 1822	Selima b. 1810	Potoooooooo mare (1794) (Family: 3)

* The Flying Dutchman is inbred 3S x 4D to the stallion Selim, meaning that he appears third generation on the sire side of his pedigree and fourth generation on the dam side of his pedigree.

== See also ==
- List of leading Thoroughbred racehorses
