= Disraeli (horse) =

British-bred Thoroughbred racehorse

- Sire: Galopin
- Grandsire: Vedette
- Dam: Lady Yardley
- Damsire: Sterling
- Sex: Stallion
- Foaled: 1895
- Died: 1911 (aged 15–16)
- Country: United Kingdom
- Colour: Bay
- Breeder: Sir Tatton Sykes, 5th Baronet
- Owner: Wallace Johnstone
- Trainer: John Dawson
- Record: 6: 2-1-0

Major wins
- Champion Breeders' Foal Plate (1897); 2000 Guineas (1898)

Disraeli (1895–1911) was a British Thoroughbred racehorse and sire. As a juvenile in 1897 he showed considerable promise by winning the Champion Breeders' Foal Plate at Derby Racecourse and then finishing second in the Middle Park Plate. In the following spring he recorded his biggest win in the 2000 Guineas but disappointed when favourite for the Epsom Derby and later ran unplaced in the St Leger. He made no impact as a breeding stallion in France.

== Background ==
Disraeli was a "good-looking, well-set-up" bay horse bred at the Sledmere Stud in East Yorkshire by Sir Tatton Sykes, 5th Baronet. As a yearling he was consigned to the Doncaster sales and bought for 1,000 guineas by Wallace Johnstone. The colt was sent into training with John Dawson, the younger brother of Mathew Dawson, at Warren House stables at Newmarket, Suffolk. Dawson had established his reputation in the 1870s when he trained Galopin and Petrarch.

His sire Galopin was an outstanding racehorse who won the Derby in 1872 and went on to be a successful and influential stallion, being Champion sire on three occasions. Disraeli's dam Lady Yardley was a full-sister to The Swan, whose descendants included Mondrian and Hansel.

== Racing career ==
=== 1897: two-year-old season ===
Disraeli made his debut in the Champion Breeders' Foal Plate on 31 August over five furlongs at Derby Racecourse. Ridden by Fred Allsopp, and starting at odds of 100/8 he led from the start and won "somewhat easily" by one and a half lengths from the odds-on favourite Champ de Mars. In the Middle Park Plate over six furlongs at Newmarket on 15 October, Disraeli started at odds of 100/15 (approximately 6.7/1) in a fourteen-runner field. With Allsopp again in the saddle he briefly took the lead in the last quarter mile but was overtaken and beaten three lengths by the Duke of Devonshire's colt Dieudonne with Wildfowler a head away in third place. On his third and final start of the season six days later Disraeli was assigned a weight of 136 pounds for the Great Sapling Plate at Sandown Park and finished as Ninus won from Nun Nicer and Sheet Anchor. He was eased down in the race by his rider John Watts when his chance of winning had gone.

=== 1898: three-year-old season ===
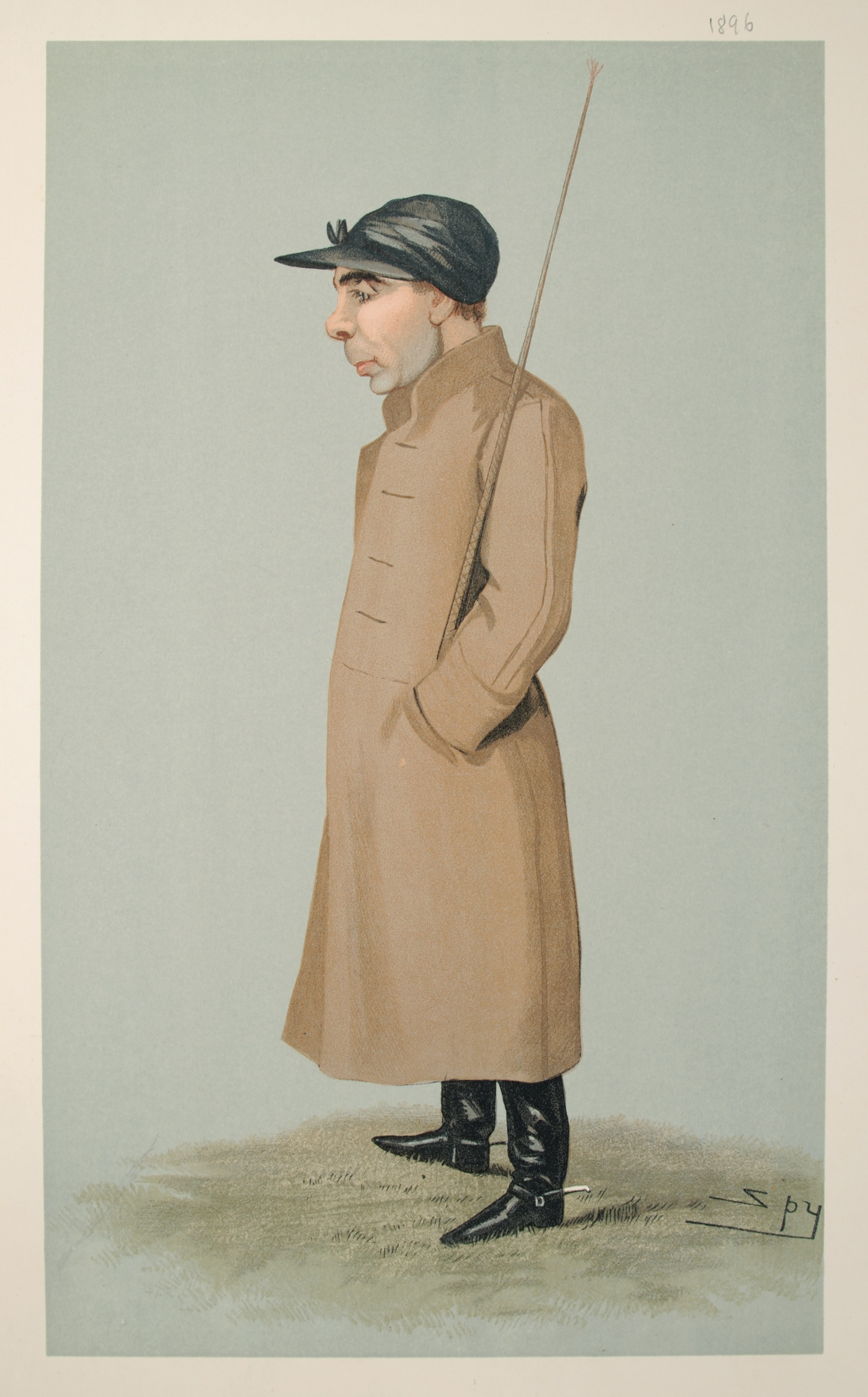
Sam Loates, who rode Disraeli in 1898

The 90th edition of the 2000 Guineas was run over the Rowley Mile on 27 April and saw Disraeli, ridden by Sam Loates start at odds of 100/8. Ninus went off the 100/30 favourite while the other twelve runners included Batt, Jeddah, Hawfinch (Dewhurst Plate) and Wildfowler. Disraeli settled behind the leaders before moving into third behind the 40/1 outsider Wantage and Ninus a furlong from the finish. He "put in some very strong work" to take the lead in the closing stages and won by 1 1/2 lengths from Wantage, with Ninus a neck away in third place.

At Epsom Racecourse on 25 May Disraeli, with Loates again in the saddle, started the 2/1 favourite for the Derby Stakes. He led the field in the early stages but dropped out of contention approaching the straight and finished tenth as Jeddah won from Batt, Dunlop and Dieudonne. According to press reports the colt failed to stay the distance and Loates was described as looking "a picture of misery" after the contest. In the St Leger over 14 1/2 furlongs at Doncaster Racecourse on 7 September Disraeli started at odds of 100/6 and finished unplaced behind Wildfowler.

In December 1898 Disraeli was put up for auction at Newmarket and bought for 850 guineas by a Mr Jones, acting on behalf of a group of French breeders.

== Stud record ==
Disraeli was retired from racing to become a breeding stallion in France. He appears to have fathered very few foals and had no success as a sire of winners. Disraeli died in 1911 at the stud of the Marquis de Tracy.

== Pedigree ==
Pedigree of Disraeli (GB), bay stallion, 1895
Sire Galopin (GB) 1872	Vedette; 1854	Voltigeur	Voltaire*
Sire Galopin (GB) 1872	Vedette; 1854	Voltigeur	Martha Lynn
Sire Galopin (GB) 1872	Vedette; 1854	Mrs Ridgway	Birdcatcher* (IRE)
Sire Galopin (GB) 1872	Vedette; 1854	Mrs Ridgway	Nan Darrell
Sire Galopin (GB) 1872	Flying Duchess; 1853	The Flying Dutchman	Bay Middleton
Sire Galopin (GB) 1872	Flying Duchess; 1853	The Flying Dutchman	Barbelle
Sire Galopin (GB) 1872	Flying Duchess; 1853	Merope	Voltaire*
Sire Galopin (GB) 1872	Flying Duchess; 1853	Merope	Juniper mare
Dam Lady Yardley (GB) 1878	Sterling; 1868	Oxford	Birdcatcher* (IRE)
Dam Lady Yardley (GB) 1878	Sterling; 1868	Oxford	Honey Dear
Dam Lady Yardley (GB) 1878	Sterling; 1868	Whisper	Flatcatcher^
Dam Lady Yardley (GB) 1878	Sterling; 1868	Whisper	Silence
Dam Lady Yardley (GB) 1878	Leda; 1859	Weatherbit	Sheet Anchor
Dam Lady Yardley (GB) 1878	Leda; 1859	Weatherbit	Miss Letty
Dam Lady Yardley (GB) 1878	Leda; 1859	Wish	Touchstone*^
Dam Lady Yardley (GB) 1878	Leda; 1859	Wish	Hope (Family 2-w)

* Disraeli is inbred 4S x 4S to the stallion Voltaire, meaning that he appears fourth generation twice on the sire side of his pedigree.

* Disraeli is inbred 4S x 4D to the stallion Birdcatcher, meaning that he appears fourth generation on the sire side of his pedigree and fourth generation on the dam side of his pedigree.

*^ Disraeli is inbred 5D x 4D to the stallion Touchstone, meaning that he appears fifth generation (via Flatcatcher)^ and fourth generation on the dam side of his pedigree.
