= 1894 Grand National =

English steeplechase horse race

- Grand National
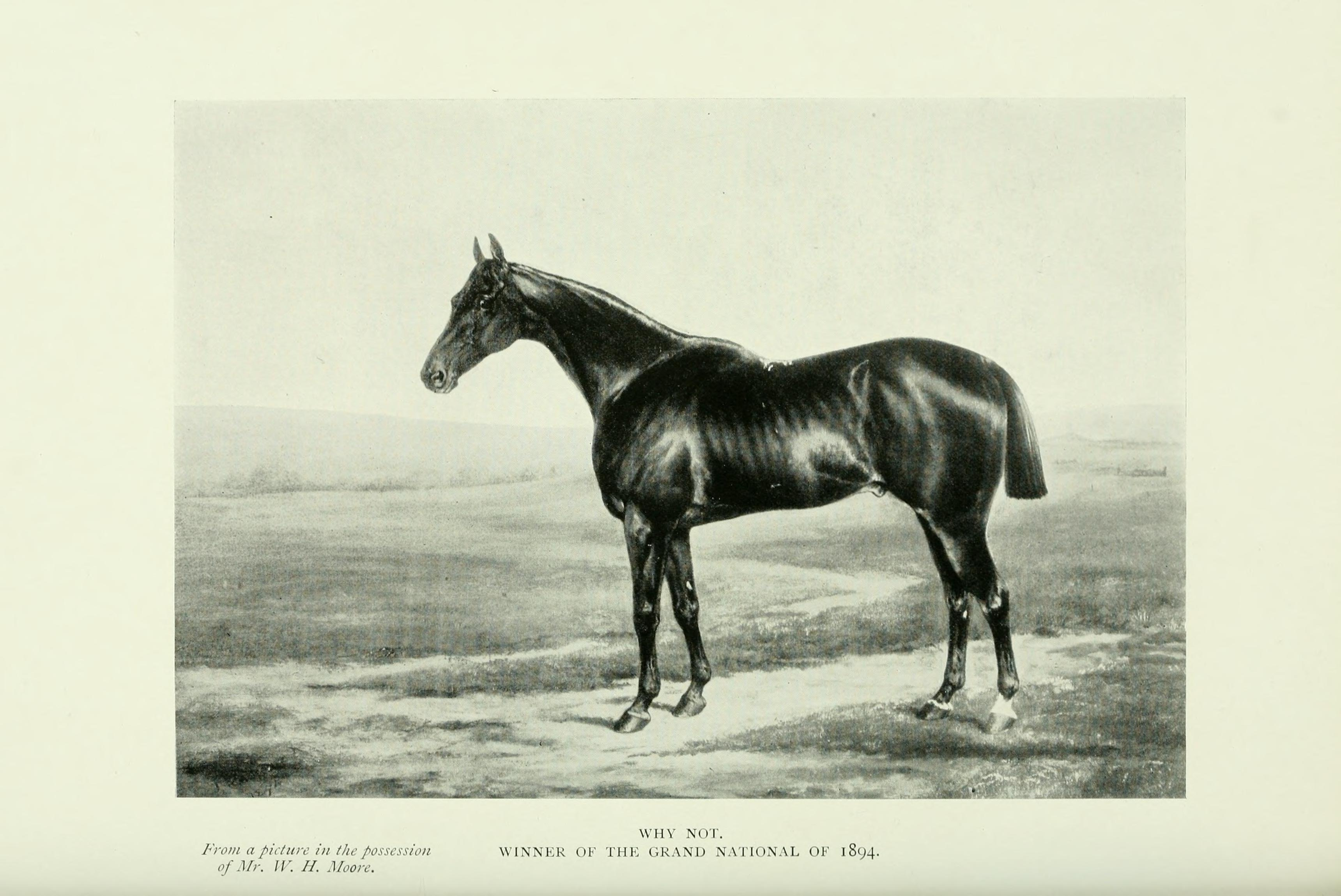
- Why Not (from Heroes and heroines of the Grand National)
- Location: Aintree
- Date: 30 March 1894
- Winning horse: Why Not
- Starting price: 5/1 JF
- Jockey: Arthur Nightingall
- Trainer: Willie Moore
- Owner: C H Fenwick
- Conditions: Good

The 1894 Grand National was the 56th renewal of the Grand National horse race that took place at Aintree near Liverpool, England, on 30 March 1894.

== Finishing Order ==
| Position | Name | Jockey | Age | Handicap (st-lb) | SP | Distance |
|---|---|---|---|---|---|---|
| 01 | Why Not | Arthur Nightingall | 13 | 11-13 | 5/1 | 1.5 lengths |
| 02 | Lady Ellen II | Terry Kavanagh | 6 | 9-10 | 25/1 | |
| 03 | Wild Man From Borneo | Joe Widger | 6 | 10-9 | 40/1 | |
| 04 | Trouville | Mr JC Cheney | 6 | 10-6 | 25/1 | |
| 05 | Aesop | George Mawson | ? | 10-12 | 6/1 | |
| 06 | Musician | Frederick Hassall | ? | 9-10 | 25/1 | |
| 07 | Carrollstown | George Williamson | ? | 10-13 | 50/1 | |
| 08 | Schooner | William Taylor | ? | 9-12 | 25/1 | |
| 09 | Varteg Hill | D Davies | ? | 9-10 | 50/1 | Last to complete |

== Non-finishers ==
| Fence | Name | Jockey | Age | Handicap (st-lb) | SP | Fate |
|---|---|---|---|---|---|---|
| 22 | Father O'Flynn | Mr C Grenfell | ? | 11-3 | 100/7 | Fell |
| 18 | Ardcarn | Mr Percy Bewicke | ? | 10-12 | 11/2 | Fell |
| 07 | Nelly Gray | Henry Escott | ? | 9-12 | 5/1 | Fell |
| 06 | Calcraft | Mr Albert Ripley | ? | 9-10 | 100/1 | Fell |
| 20 | Dawn | George Morris | ? | 9-7 | 25/1 | Fell |
