= 1888 Grand National =

English steeplechase horse race

- Grand National
- Location: Aintree
- Date: 23 March 1888
- Winning horse: Playfair
- Starting price: 40/1
- Jockey: George Mawson
- Trainer: Tom Cannon
- Owner: Ned Baird
- Conditions: Good to soft

The 1888 Grand National was the 50th renewal of the Grand National horse race that took place at Aintree near Liverpool, England, on 23 March 1888.

== Finishing Order ==
| Position | Name | Jockey | Handicap (st-lb) | SP | Distance |
|---|---|---|---|---|---|
| 01 | Playfair | George Mawson | 10-7 | 40/1 | 10 Lengths |
| 02 | Frigate | William Beasley | 11-2 | 100/8 | 4 Lengths |
| 03 | Ballot Box | William Nightingall | 12-4 | 25/1 | 1 Length |
| 04 | Ringlet | Tom Skelton | 11-11 | 100/9 | 4 Lengths |
| 05 | Aladdin | Chris Waller | 11-0 | 33/1 | |
| 06 | Jeanie | Arthur? Barker | 10-6 | 1000/5 | |
| 07 | Gamecock | Roddy Owen | 12-4 | 20/1 | |
| 08 | Magic | Arthur Hall | 10-12 | 25/1 | |
| 09 | The Badger | Arthur Nightingall | 11-1 | 10/1 | |
| 10 | Johnny Longtail | Bill Dollery | 12-0 | 40/1 | |
| 11 | Old Joe | Bill Daniels | 11-9 | 18/1 | Last to complete |

== Non-finishers ==
| Fence | Name | Jockey | Handicap (st-lb) | SP | Fate |
|---|---|---|---|---|---|
| 26 | Usna | Harry Beasley | 12-7 | 7/1 | Pulled Up |
| 29 | Savoyard | George Lambton | 12-4 | 25/1 | Fell |
| 10 | Bellona | Charles Cunningham | 11-12 | 100/6 | Fell |
| 04 | Spahi | Terry Kavanagh | 11-9 | 33/1 | Refused |
| 29 | Chancellor | William Moore | 11-5 | 8/1 | Pulled Up |
| 04 | Kinfauns | Jesse Page | 10-10 | 100/1 | Refused |
| 03 | The Fawn | Ted Wilson | 10-6 | 20/1 | Fell |
| 17 | Trap | Gustavus Lowe | 10-6 | 20/1 | Fell |
| 09 | Cork | William Woodland | 10-6 | 100/1 | Fell |
