= 1911 Grand National =

English steeplechase horse race

- Grand National
- Location: Aintree
- Date: 24 March 1911
- Winning horse: Glenside
- Starting price: 20/1
- Jockey: (Wales) Jack Anthony
- Trainer: R H Collis
- Owner: Frank Bibby
- Conditions: Good to soft (good in places)

The 1911 Grand National was the 73rd official annual renewal of the Grand National horse race that took place at Aintree Racecourse near Liverpool, England, on 24 March 1911.

The only moving images of the race turned up in a London auction in 2007, found by Angus Loughran, and first shown to the public in a BBC documentary The Big Flutter: The Grand National on Film in 2011.

Torrential rain caused many riders to fall. Twenty-two out of the twenty-six runners failed to finish.

The race was won by the 20:1 shot Glenside, a broken winded one-eyed horse, ridden by Jack Anthony. He went into the lead after Caubeen and Rathnally collided after Becher's Brook, as the only horse that wasn't remounted, and went on to a twenty length victory. He was followed by Rathnally, Shady Girl and in fourth place Fool-Hardy, the only horses to finish the race.

== Finishing Order ==
Position	Name	Jockey	Age	Handicap (st-lb)	SP	Distance
01	Glenside	Jack Anthony	9	10-3	20/1	20 lengths
02	Rathnally	Robert Chadwick	6	11-0	8/1	
03	Shady Girl	G Clancy	?	10-5	33/1	
04	Foolhardy	Mr MacNeill	?	9-7	50/1	Last to complete

== Non-finishers ==
Fence	Name	Jockey	Age	Handicap (st-lb)	SP	Fate
?	Lutteur III	Georges Parfrement	?	12-3	7/2	Fell
?	Trianon III	R Sauval	6	11-8	33/1	Fell
?	Jenkinstown	Percy Woodland	?	11-7	100/7	Pulled Up
?	Mount Prospect's Fortune	Edmund Driscoll	?	11-6	66/1	Fell
?	Rory O'Moore	Percy Whitaker	?	11-6	100/7	Knocked Over
?	Caubeen	Alf Newey	?	11-5	8/1	Fell
?	Lord Rivers	William Payne snr	?	10-9	33/1	Fell
?	Fetlar's Pride	John Walsh jnr	?	10-7	25/1	Fell
?	Carsey	Patrick Cowley	?	10-6	100/9	Fell
?	Viz	Bryan Bletsoe	?	10-5	50/1	Fell
?	Monk V	Mr F Drake	?	10-1	100/1	Fell
?	Schwarmer	F Damly	?	10-0	25/1	Fell
?	Suhescan	A V Chapman	?	10-1	50/1	Fell
?	Great Cross	Mr Walwyn	6	9-13	66/1	Fell
?	Circassian's Pride	Isaac Morgan	?	9-12	25/1	Knocked Over
?	Precentor II	A Aylin	?	9-11	100/1	Fell
?	Bridge IV	Peter Roberts	?	9-9	100/1	Fell
?	Carder	B Roberts	?	9-7	50/1	Fell
?	Flaxen	Arthur Smith	?	9-7	50/1	Fell
?	Roman Candle	T Wilmot	?	9-7	28/1	Fell
?	Hesperus Magnus	Willian Fitzgerald	?	9-7	66/1	Pulled Up
?	Hercules II	Mr R W Hall	?	9-8	50/1	Pulled Up
