= 1907 Melbourne Cup =

Edition of the Melbourne Cup

- Melbourne Cup
- Location: Flemington Racecourse
- Date: 5 Nov 1907
- Distance: 2 miles
- Winning horse: Apologue
- Winning time: 3:27.5
- Final odds: 3/1
- Jockey: W. Evans
- Trainer: Isaac Earnshaw
- Owner: R. L. Cleland
- Surface: Turf
- Attendance: 88,415

The 1907 Melbourne Cup was a two-mile handicap horse race which took place on Tuesday, 5 November 1907.

This race saw a 19-horse field compete. Jockey Bill Evans rode Apologue to victory after losing 19 pounds in a few days to meet the horse's weight of 7 stone 9 pounds. Evans was so weak after the race he was only able to unbuckle the saddle's girth strap before collapsing unconscious. 15 minutes later and still unconscious he was laid on top of the scales and correct weight was then signaled. Evans would regain conscious an hour later. Poseidon the stable mate of Apologue and the 1906 race winner finished 11th.

This is the list of placegetters for the 1907 Melbourne Cup.

Place	Name	Jockey	Trainer	Owner
1	Apologue	W. Evans	Isaac Earnshaw	R L Cleland
2	Mooltan	W. McLachlan	H. Rayner	
3	Mountain King	F. Hickey	J. Burton	

== See also ==
- Melbourne Cup
- List of Melbourne Cup winners
- Victoria Racing Club
