= 1899 Melbourne Cup =

Annual horse race in Victoria, Australia

- Melbourne Cup
- Location: Flemington Racecourse
- Date: 7 November 1899
- Distance: 2 miles
- Winning horse: Merriwee
- Winning time: 3:36.25
- Final odds: 7/1
- Jockey: Vivian Turner
- Trainer: James Wilson Jnr
- Owner: Herbert Power
- Surface: Turf
- Attendance: 60,000

The 1899 Melbourne Cup was a two-mile handicap horse race which took place on Tuesday, 7 November 1899.

This year was the thirty-ninth running of the Melbourne Cup.

This is the list of placegetters for the 1899 Melbourne Cup.

Place	Name	Jockey	Trainer	Owner
1	Merriwee	Vivian Turner	James Wilson Jnr	Herbert Power
2	Voyou	F. Kuhn	J. Allsop	
3	Dewey	L. Kuhn	T. Payten	

== See also ==
- Melbourne Cup
- List of Melbourne Cup winners
- Victoria Racing Club
