= 1909 Grand National =

English steeplechase horse race

- Grand National
- Location: Aintree
- Date: 26 March 1909
- Winning horse: (France) Lutteur III
- Starting price: 100/9
- Jockey: (France) Georges Parfrement
- Trainer: Harry Escott
- Owner: (France) James Hennessy
- Conditions: Good (good to soft places)

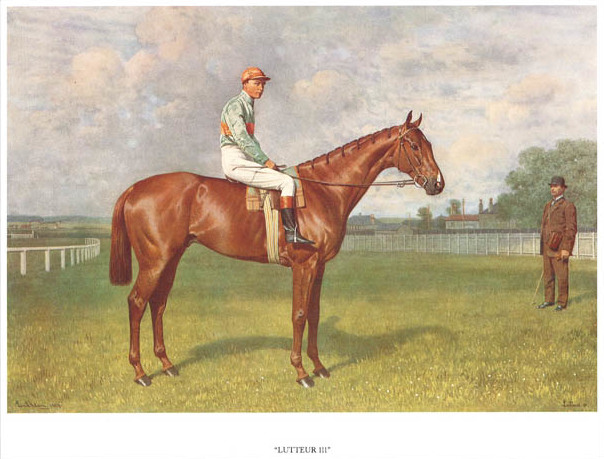
Lutteur III, portrait by Emil Adam

The 1909 Grand National was the 71st renewal of the Grand National horse race that took place at Aintree near Liverpool, England, on 26 March 1909.

== Finishing order ==
Position	Name	Jockey	Age	Handicap (st-lb)	SP	Distance
01	Lutteur III	Georges Parfrement	5	10-11	100/9	2 Lengths
02	Judas	Bob Chadwick	?	10-10	33/1	
03	Caubeen	Frank Mason	?	11-7	20/1	
04	Tom West	H Murphy	?	10-9	100/6	
?	Hercules II	Mr A Gordon	?	9-13	33/1	
?	Leinster	John Rogers	?	11-7	100/6	
?	Shady Girl	G Clancy	?	10-9	100/9	
?	Carsey	Mr J M Kerne	6	10-8	100/1	
?	Robin Hood IV	Mr R Walker	?	9-9	33/1	
?	Phaeton	Mr H Ussher	?	10-4	100/1	
?	Ascetic's Silver	Aubrey Hastings	?	12-7	20/1	
?	Wee Busbie	D Phelan	?	9-12	100/1	
?	Logan Rock	H Jackson	?	10-0	50/1	
?	Rathvale	Willie Morgan	?	11-7	100/1	
?	Lord Rivers	Walter Bulteel	?	10-6	25/1	

== Non-finishers ==
Fence	Name	Jockey	Age	Handicap (st-lb)	SP	Fate
?	Wild Fox III	Captain W A Pallin	?	9-9	100/1	Refused
?	Brineoge	Herbert Smyth	?	10-7	100/1	Fell
?	Count Rufus	William Payne	?	10-0	50/1	Fell
?	Red Hall	Mr H G Farrant	?	10-0	50/1	Fell
?	Rustic Queen	Arthur Wood	?	12-0	50/1	Fell
?	Rubio	W Bissell	?	11-9	20/1	Fell
?	Mattie MacGregor	Richard Morgan	?	11-4	100/6	Refused
?	Domino	Patrick Cowley	?	11-1	100/8	Fell
?	Lord Chatham	J McKenna	?	11-0	50/1	?
?	Wickham	Captain Collins	?	10-0	50/1	Fell
?	Paddy Maher	Mr O'B.Butler	?	10-9	25/1	?
?	Black Ivory	Mr A Scott	?	10-9	100/1	Pulled Up
?	Red Monk	E Morgan	?	10-6	100/1	Pulled Up
?	Davy Jones	Jack Anthony	6	10-0	100/6	Fell
?	Buckaway II	B Wall	?	9-12	100/1	Pulled Up
?	Young Buck	Henry Bletsoe	?	9-12	100/1	Fell
?	The Lurcher	Ernest Piggott	?	9-9	25/1	Fell
