= Rhodora (horse) =

Irish-bred Thoroughbred racehorse

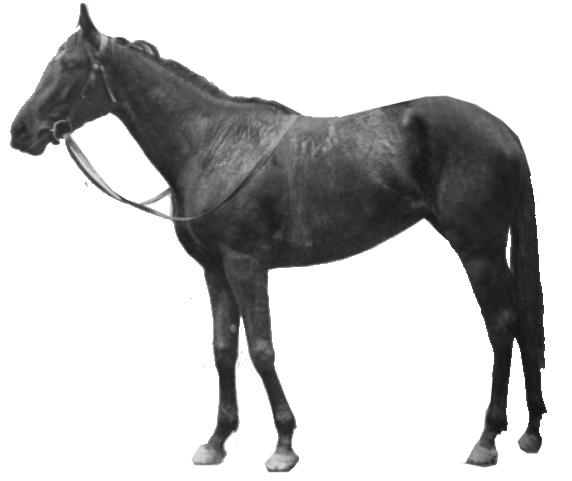
- Rhodora in 1908.
- Sire: St Frusquin
- Grandsire: St Simon
- Dam: Rhoda B.
- Damsire: Hanover
- Sex: Mare
- Foaled: 1905
- Country: Ireland
- Colour: Brown
- Breeder: Richard Croker
- Owner: Richard Croker
- Trainer: James Allen
- Record: 16: 8-3-0
- Earnings: £ 9,809

Major wins
- Dewhurst Stakes (1907); 1000 Guineas (1908)

Rhodora (1905 – 1921) was an Irish Thoroughbred racehorse and broodmare. She was one of the best juvenile fillies in the British Isles in 1907 when she won three of her six races including a victory over strong male opposition in the Dewhurst Stakes. In the following year she won the 1000 Guineas but was brought down when favourite for the Epsom Oaks. She won two more races in Ireland before her racing career was ended by injury. She was retired from racing to become a broodmare, but none of her produce survived long after birth.

== Background ==
Rhodora was a brown mare bred and owned by the American political boss Richard Croker. During her racing career she was trained in Ireland by James Allen. Also involved in the conditioning of the filly was a Dr McCabe, whose methods, which involved an emphasis on sunlight and fresh air, ran contrary to prevailing opinions.

She was sired by St. Frusquin who won the Middle Park Plate, Dewhurst Plate, 2000 Guineas, Princess of Wales's Stakes and Eclipse Stakes and was described as one of the best horses of the 19th century. His other progeny included Flair, St. Amant, Rosedrop, Quintessence, and Mirska. Rhodora's dam the American-bred Rhoda B., also produced the Epsom Derby winner Orby.

== Racing career ==
=== 1907: two-year-old season ===
As a two-year-old in 1907 Rhodora ran six times. She recorded three wins and two second places. In July she was sent to England for the National Breeders' Produce Stakes at Sandown Park and finished second, beaten a neck by the leading colt White Eagle. She subsequently sustained an injury in a race at Leopardstown when she was kicked by a colt named Temeraire.

In autumn the filly was sent to Newmarket where her day-to-day conditioning was handled by Fred McCabe. In October she was ridden by Billy Bullock in the Dewhurst Plate and won at odds of 100/7 from a field which included the King's colt Perrier (who finished second), Norman, Your Majesty and the Duke of Westminster's highly regarded Vamose. She was entered for the Middle Park Plate, but had to withdraw from the race in October due to a respiratory disease epidemic at Croker's farm in Newmarket.

=== 1908: three-year-old season ===
On 8 May at Newmarket, Rhodora was one of nineteen fillies to contest the 95th running of the 1000 Guineas in which she was ridden by the American jockey Lucien Lyne and started at odds of 100/8. She looked less than fully fit before the race and Croker reportedly had little confidence in her chances. The Middle Park Plate winner Lesbia started favourite while the best fancied of the other runners were Bracelet (Cheveley Park Stakes) and Elm Twig. Rhodora appeared to have the race won a long way from home and came home two lengths clear of Bracelet, with Ardentrive a neck away in third. Her winning time was a second faster than the one recorded by Norman in the 2000 Guineas over the same course and distance.

On 5 June Rhodora started 6/4 favourite ahead of the Derby winner Signorinetta in the Epsom Oaks over one and a half miles but failed to finish the race, being brought down when French Partridge slipped and fell in front of her. She was back in action late that month and finished unplaced behind White Eagle in the Biennial Stakes at Royal Ascot. She ran poorly again when unplaced behind Your Majesty in the St George Stakes at Liverpool in July.

In September Rhodora returned to Ireland where she won both the Turf Club Cup and the Champion Prize at the Curragh. In the latter race she came home ten lengths clear of the Irish Derby winner Wild Bouquet. The filly was being prepared for a run in the Cambridgeshire Handicap when she suffered a training injury which ended her season.

Rhodora's earnings for the year amounted to £7,380.

== Assessment and honours ==
In their book, A Century of Champions, based on the Timeform rating system, John Randall and Tony Morris rated Rhodora an "inferior" winner of the 1000 Guineas.

== Breeding record ==
Rhodora was retired from racing to become a broodmare at Croker's Glencairn stud. After failing to conceive in her first two seasons she was bred to her half-brother Orby, an experiment in close inbreeding which "caused astonishment in breeding circles". She had an obstructed labour resulting in the death of the foal in 1913. She produced only one foal, a chestnut colt by White Magic that was euthanised as a two-year-old due to bad joints. Barren for many years, despite repeated breeding to the stallion White Magic, Rhodora was euthanised in the autumn of 1921 by her new owner Donald Fraser. Her body was rendered to make dog food for his kennels. The act was viewed as "a sombre and heartless end" for the mare by the press.

== Pedigree ==
Pedigree of Rhodora (IRE), brown mare, 1903
Sire St. Frusquin (GB) 1893	St. Simon; 1881	Galopin	Vedette
Sire St. Frusquin (GB) 1893	St. Simon; 1881	Galopin	Flying Duchess
Sire St. Frusquin (GB) 1893	St. Simon; 1881	St. Angela	King Tom
Sire St. Frusquin (GB) 1893	St. Simon; 1881	St. Angela	Adeline
Sire St. Frusquin (GB) 1893	Isabel; 1879	Plebeian	Joskin
Sire St. Frusquin (GB) 1893	Isabel; 1879	Plebeian	Queen Elizabeth
Sire St. Frusquin (GB) 1893	Isabel; 1879	Parma	Parmesan
Sire St. Frusquin (GB) 1893	Isabel; 1879	Parma	Archeress
Dam Rhoda B. (USA) 1895	Hanover; 1884	Hindoo	Virgil
Dam Rhoda B. (USA) 1895	Hanover; 1884	Hindoo	Florence
Dam Rhoda B. (USA) 1895	Hanover; 1884	Bourbon Belle	Bonnie Scotland
Dam Rhoda B. (USA) 1895	Hanover; 1884	Bourbon Belle	Ella D
Dam Rhoda B. (USA) 1895	Margerine; 1886	Algerine	Abd-El-Kader
Dam Rhoda B. (USA) 1895	Margerine; 1886	Algerine	Nina
Dam Rhoda B. (USA) 1895	Margerine; 1886	Sweet Songstress (GB)	Doncaster
Dam Rhoda B. (USA) 1895	Margerine; 1886	Sweet Songstress (GB)	Melodious (Family: 26)
