= Warlock (horse) =

British Thoroughbred racehorse

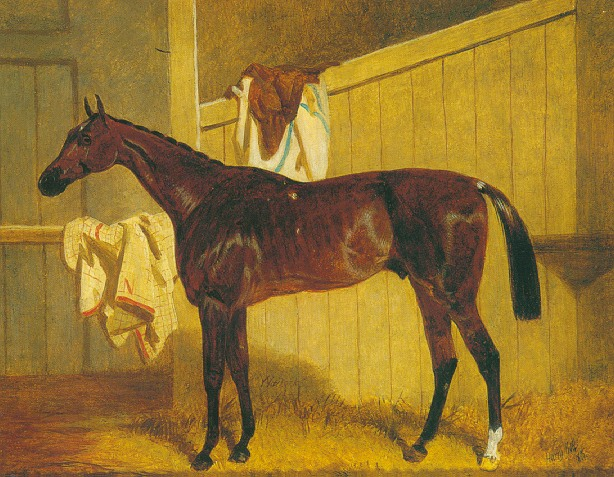
- Warlock as painted by Harry Hall
- Sire: Birdcatcher
- Grandsire: Sir Hercules
- Dam: Elphine
- Damsire: Emilius
- Sex: Stallion
- Foaled: 1853
- Country: United Kingdom
- Colour: Bay or Roan
- Breeder: Lord Durham
- Owner: Anthony Nichol
- Trainer: John Scott
- Record: 16: 6-2-1
- Earnings: £4060 (in 1856)

Major wins
- Great Ebor Handicap- York (1856); Great Ebor Handicap- Doncaster (1857); St Leger Stakes (1856)

Warlock (1853 – 1871) was a Thoroughbred racehorse that won the 1856 St Leger Stakes.

== Background ==
Warlock was foaled in 1853 at Lambton Park, the country seat of his breeder the Earl of Durham. Warlock's sire Birdcatcher produced many stakes winners and was a leading sire 15 times during his career. Warlock's dam, Elphine (1837 – 1857), was sired by the 1823 Derby winner Emilius and was bought by Lord Durham in 1850. Warlock was Elphine's tenth foal out of the 12 she produced during her lifetime. Elphine also produced the sire Lambton (sired by The Cure), which sired the Doncaster and Goodwood Cup winner Shannon. Elphine's unnamed daughter sired by The Cure (foaled in 1849) produced the 1860 2000 Guineas winner The Wizard.

Warlock was referred to as either a roan or bay horse. The base colour of the majority of his coat was bay and he was registered with the Jockey Club at birth as a bay roan. Warlock had a large amount of white hairs distributed over his head, neck, and back. As he did not turn completely gray with age, he was identified as a roan in racing publications. Roan coloration is unusual in Thoroughbreds, and he was described as "a veritable dusty miller among Thoroughbreds." Warlock was 15 hands 2.5 inches high and was described as "very stout and honest" but with poor leg and shoulder conformation. He also had a small white star on the forehead and a left hind sock. He was initially named Merlin before his name was changed to Warlock for his racing career, which was likely done because another colt sired by Birdcatcher in 1853 was also named Merlin.

== Racing career ==
Warlock was bought by Mr. Anthony Nichol in 1854 and raced in his name for the majority of his career. A chemist by trade, Nichol also purchased The Wizard from Lord Durham and won the 1851 St Leger with Newminster. Warlock was trained by John Scott.

=== 1855: two-year-old season ===
Warlock ran three times as a two-year-old. At Epsom in May, Warlock ran a dead heat for second place in the Woodcote Stakes with Padwick's filly Spindle (winner of the July Stakes at Newmarket). He was unplaced in the Prince of Wales's Stakes run in August at York. He won a £200 subscription stakes at Doncaster in his final engagement for the year.

=== 1856: three-year-old season ===
Warlock had a series of racing mishaps as a three-year-old. While running in the North Derby at Newcastle, he suddenly bolted off the course and was disqualified. At the same meeting, Warlock fell while running for the Northumberland Plate and was also disqualified. At Carlisle, he was beaten by Fisherman for the Cumberland Plate after he was accidentally slowed by his jockey, George Fordham, after the first lap. Warlock managed to recover and was only beaten by a margin of two lengths. At York, Warlock won the Great Ebor Handicap, beating Merin (sired by Birdcatcher) and six other runners. He was unplaced for the Cup at the St Leger meeting. Warlock did not run in the Derby due to sore legs.

==== St Leger Stakes ====
The 1856 St Leger was run on Wednesday, September 17 with a field of nine horses, including the Derby winner Ellington, Bonnie Scotland, and Artillery. Ellington was favored to win the race, but Warlock won easily by two lengths, the Derby winner ultimately finishing unplaced. Bonnie Scotland and Artillery tied for second place.

=== Later career ===
In 1857, Warlock was eighth in the Ascot Gold Cup run in June, unplaced in the Chester Cup, and sixth in the Cesarewitch Stakes run in October. At York in August, Warlock won the Queen's Plate beating Fisherman by a neck. At Doncaster, he won the Great Ebor Handicap, beating the fillies Tasmania and Melissa. At the same meeting, he ran third for the Cup won by Vedette. At Lincoln, he won the Queen's Plate and was fourth in the York Great Ebor Handicap.

Warlock was not extensively campaigned in 1858, racing only twice before retirement. He ran fourth for the Great Northern Handicap at York and finished fourth for the Cup at Ascot, won by Fisherman.

== Stud career ==
Retired to stud in 1859, Warlock first stood at Kirby Farm in Tadcaster for a fee of 10 guineas each mare bred. Moved to the Sheffield Lane Paddocks, his fee in 1870 remained at 10 guineas. Warlock's only son to continue the sire line was Tynedale, which was third to Achievement and Hermit in the 1867 Doncaster Cup. Warlock also produced War, which won the 1866 Ascot Stakes. While not considered a successful sire, Warlock does appear in modern Thoroughbred pedigrees due to the influence of his daughter Fairy (1860 out of Leila by Melbourne), who is the dam of the mare Jenny Diver. Jenny Diver produced the Oaks winner Jenny Howlet and the taproot mares Jennie Winkle (Family 20-d; descendant Tagalie) and Palmflower (Family 20-c; descendants Musa and Blue Peter). Warlock was euthanised in September 1871 at the Sheffield Lane Paddocks.

== Sire line tree ==
- Warlock
  - Vaucresson
  - War
  - Tynedale
    - Border Minstrel
      - Floreal
    - Riversdale

== Pedigree ==
Pedigree of Warlock (GB), Bay roan colt, 1853
Sire Birdcatcher (IRE) Chestnut, 1833	Sir Hercules; 1826	Whalebone	Waxy
Sire Birdcatcher (IRE) Chestnut, 1833	Sir Hercules; 1826	Whalebone	Penelope
Sire Birdcatcher (IRE) Chestnut, 1833	Sir Hercules; 1826	Peri	Wanderer
Sire Birdcatcher (IRE) Chestnut, 1833	Sir Hercules; 1826	Peri	Thalestris
Sire Birdcatcher (IRE) Chestnut, 1833	Guiccioli; 1823	Bob Booty	Chanticleer
Sire Birdcatcher (IRE) Chestnut, 1833	Guiccioli; 1823	Bob Booty	Ierne
Sire Birdcatcher (IRE) Chestnut, 1833	Guiccioli; 1823	Flight	Escape
Sire Birdcatcher (IRE) Chestnut, 1833	Guiccioli; 1823	Flight	Young Heroine
Dam Elphine Bay, 1837	Emilius; 1820	Orville	Beningbrough*
Dam Elphine Bay, 1837	Emilius; 1820	Orville	Evelina
Dam Elphine Bay, 1837	Emilius; 1820	Emily	Stamford
Dam Elphine Bay, 1837	Emilius; 1820	Emily	Whiskey mare
Dam Elphine Bay, 1837	Variation; 1827	Bustard	Castrel
Dam Elphine Bay, 1837	Variation; 1827	Bustard	Miss Hap
Dam Elphine Bay, 1837	Variation; 1827	Johanna Southcote	Beningbrough*
Dam Elphine Bay, 1837	Variation; 1827	Johanna Southcote	Lavinia (Family 9)

* Warlock is inbred 4D x 4D to the stallion Beningbrough, meaning that he appears fourth generation twice on the dam side of his pedigree.
