= Flair (horse) =

British Thoroughbred racehorse

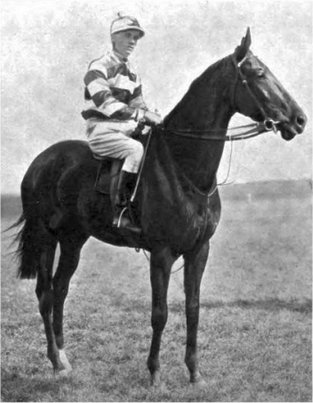
- Flair with jockey Bernard Dillon in 1906.
- Sire: St Frusquin
- Grandsire: St Simon
- Dam: Glare
- Damsire: Ayrshire
- Sex: Mare
- Foaled: 1903
- Country: United Kingdom
- Colour: Bay or brown
- Breeder: Sir Daniel Cooper, 3rd Baronet
- Owner: Sir Daniel Cooper
- Trainer: Peter Gilpin
- Record: 5: 4-0-0

Major wins
- Imperial Produce Stakes (1905); Middle Park Plate (1905); Free Handicap (1905); 1000 Guineas (1906)

Flair (1903 – 1923) was a British Thoroughbred racehorse and broodmare. After finishing fourth on her debut in July 1905 she was undefeated in her four subsequent races. She was the dominant two-year-old of either sex in England in the autumn of 1905, beating male opposition to take the Imperial Produce Stakes, Middle Park Plate and Free Handicap. In the following spring, she was a very easy winner of the 1000 Guineas and was strongly fancied for the Epsom Derby before her racing career was ended by injury. Her record as a broodmare was disappointing.

== Background ==
Flair was a bay or brown mare bred and owned by the Australian Sir Daniel Cooper. Throughout her racing career she was trained by Peter Gilpin at his Clarehaven Stable in Newmarket, Suffolk.

She was sired by St. Frusquin who won the Middle Park Plate, Dewhurst Plate, 2000 Guineas, Princess of Wales's Stakes and Eclipse Stakes and was described as one of the best horses of the 19th century. His other progeny included St. Amant, Rosedrop, Quintessence, and Mirska. Flair's dam Glare won the Brocklesby Stakes as a two-year-old and went on to produce the Middle Park Stakes winner Lesbia and the influential broodmare Lady Lightfoot.

== Racing career ==
=== 1905: two-year-old season ===
Flair sustained her only defeat as a two-year-old in July when she finished fourth to Sarcelle in the National Breeders' Produce Stakes at Sandown Park on her racecourse debut. In the £3,000 Imperial Produce Stakes over six furlongs at Kempton Park Racecourse on 13 October she won from the favourite Sarcelle after leading from the start. A week later at Newmarket Racecourse started at odds of 11/4 for the prestigious Middle Park Stakes. Ridden by William Higgs she won from the colts Admirable Crichton and Gingal. The filly ended her season by winning the Free Handicap under top weight of 126 pounds at Newmarket in early November.

Flair's earnings for 1905 totaled £5,384.

=== 1906: three-year-old season ===
On 4 May Flair faced eleven opponents in the 93rd running of the 1000 Guineas over the Rowley Mile and started the 11/10 favourite ahead of Victorious, Ulalume and Snow Glory. Ridden by Bernard Dillon she drew right away from the fields in the closing stages won in a "hack canter" by three lengths and three quarters of a length from Lischana and Paid Up. Her winning time of 1:40.6 was more than three seconds faster than the one recorded by Gorgos in the 2000 Guineas over the same course two days earlier.

Immediately after her success in the Newmarket classic Flair was regarded as a serious contender for the Epsom Derby, with bookmakers making her the second choice in the ante-post betting. When asked if he thought that the filly would contest the Derby the famous racehorse owner Henry Chaplin replied "of course she will, and I should think she'll win it". A few days later, however, it was announced that Flair had been withdrawn from the race having begun to show signs of lameness a week after the Guineas. The cause was variously described as a "cracked heel" sustained when she struck into herself in a training gallop, or as "an injury to one of her hindjoints". An unintended consequence of her absence was that her stablemate Spearmint who was being prepared for the Grand Prix de Paris was re-routed to Epsom and won the Derby.

Flair did not race again and was retired at the end of the year.

== Assessment and honours ==
In their book, A Century of Champions, based on the Timeform rating system, John Randall and Tony Morris rated Flair a "superior" winner of the 1000 Guineas.

== Breeding record ==
As a broodmare, Flair produced several minor winners, but no top-class performers. Her foals included:

- Gallon, a chestnut colt, foaled in 1909, sired by Gallinule
- Sentiment, bay filly, 1912, by Spearmint
- Foxcat, brown filly, 1914, by Llangwm
- Colt by Lemberg, 1915, (died young)

Flair did not produce any live offspring after 1914 and died in 1923.

== Pedigree ==
Pedigree of Flair (GB), bay or brown mare, 1903
| Sire St. Frusquin (GB) 1893 | St. Simon; 1881 | Galopin | Vedette |
| Sire St. Frusquin (GB) 1893 | St. Simon; 1881 | Galopin | Flying Duchess |
| Sire St. Frusquin (GB) 1893 | St. Simon; 1881 | St. Angela | King Tom |
| Sire St. Frusquin (GB) 1893 | St. Simon; 1881 | St. Angela | Adeline |
| Sire St. Frusquin (GB) 1893 | Isabel; 1879 | Plebeian | Joskin |
| Sire St. Frusquin (GB) 1893 | Isabel; 1879 | Plebeian | Queen Elizabeth |
| Sire St. Frusquin (GB) 1893 | Isabel; 1879 | Parma | Parmesan |
| Sire St. Frusquin (GB) 1893 | Isabel; 1879 | Parma | Archeress |
| Dam Glare (GB) 1891 | Ayrshire; 1885 | Hampton | Lord Clifden |
| Dam Glare (GB) 1891 | Ayrshire; 1885 | Hampton | Lady Langden |
| Dam Glare (GB) 1891 | Ayrshire; 1885 | Atalanta | Galopin |
| Dam Glare (GB) 1891 | Ayrshire; 1885 | Atalanta | Feronia |
| Dam Glare (GB) 1891 | Footlight; 1876 | Cremorne | Parmesan |
| Dam Glare (GB) 1891 | Footlight; 1876 | Cremorne | Rigolboche |
| Dam Glare (GB) 1891 | Footlight; 1876 | Paraffin | Blair Athol |
| Dam Glare (GB) 1891 | Footlight; 1876 | Paraffin | Paradigm (Family: 1-m) |

- Flair was inbred 3 × 4 to Galopin, meaning that this stallion appears in both the third and fourth generations of her pedigree. She was also inbred 4 × 4 to Parmesan.
