= Ralph Bullock (jockey) =

British jockey

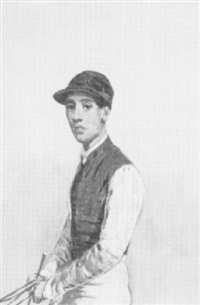
- Portrait of Ralph Bullock by Harry Hall

Personal information
- Born: 1841 Morpeth, Northumberland
- Died: 23 January 1863 (aged 21–22) Tupgill, North Yorkshire
- Resting place: Morpeth, Northumberland Rumoured to have died from an infection from his cut throat razor he was given as a memento for winning The Derby.
- Occupation: Jockey

Horse racing career
- Sport: Horse racing

Major racing wins
- Major races Epsom Derby (1861)

Significant horses
- Kettledrum

Ralph "Geordie" Bullock (1841 – 23 January 1863) was a Derby-winning British jockey.

== Early life ==
He was born in late 1841 in Morpeth into a well-known Northern sporting family. His father was a trainer, and his nephews would become involved in racing too - one was a trainer; the other, Billy, won the 1908 Derby on Signorinetta and was leading jockey in Denmark from 1924 to 1927.

== Racing career ==
At the age of ten, he joined the stables of Thomas Dawson at Tupgill. He made his debut in 1853, finishing unplaced on Mary Aislabie at Harrogate. His first victory was in the autumn of 1854 at Kelso, riding Ellermire for Admiral Harcourt. At that time, he was registered as able to ride at 4 stone 3 pounds.

He rose to prominence quickly and in 1857 had his most successful year in numerical terms when he won 43 races, although his biggest races were still to come.

In 1859, he won the Chester Stewards’ Cup on Tunstall Maid, and had his first ride in the Derby, finishing unplaced 100/1 outsider Lovett.

In 1860, he finished second on High Treason in the St Leger, behind St Albans.

The highlight of his short career was the 1861 Derby, which he won on Kettledrum for owner Charles Towneley. The Epsom course itself had been badly neglected and was strewn with rubbish on the day of the race. In the event, Kettledrum was a luck winner. The favourite, Dundee, ridden by Henry Custance looked like he would win easily at Tattenham Corner, but eighty yards from the winning post, the horse broke down badly on both forelegs and Kettledrum won by a neck. Bullock would also finish second in the Oaks on Lady Ripon. Riding Kettledrum in the Doncaster Cup later that year, he scored a memorable dead heat with the filly that had won the Oaks, Brown Duchess.

After his Derby success, Bullock became better known in the south and rode Tom Whiffer to victory in the Ascot Vase, the Doncaster Cup and the Goodwood Cup. He rode in the Derby again, finishing fourth on Neptunus. The final race he ever won was on the Saturday of Newmarket's Haughton Meeting in 1862 on Smoke, and the last race he ever rode was on Lady Louisa at Shrewsbury, both for Mr Jackson.

== Personal life and death ==
Bullock was fond of strong coffee to steady his nerves. He enjoyed an occasional cigar, and was a keen hunter, regularly attending the Bedale hunt. He was riding with them on the Friday before his death.

The next day, Saturday 17 January 1863, he was returning to Tupgill from Mr Jackson's house in Oram when he felt a pain and coldness in his left cheek. This began to swell and by Thursday he was in a coma. He never regained consciousness and died at Tuphill on Friday 23 January. His brother, who worked at Tattersall's would learn of his death in the Saturday newspapers. It was established that he died from deep-rooted erysipelas, also known as St Anthony's Fire. Rumoured to have died from an infection from his cut throat razor given to him as a memento for winning the 1861 Epsom Derby.

He was buried at Morpeth on 27 January 1863, and his funeral was attended by trainer Thomas Dawson, owner Mr Jackson and jockeys Tommy Aldcroft, Fred Bates, John Arnold, Tom Challoner and John Osborne Jr. He left an estate of less than £800.

== Statistics ==
Bullock won a total of 212 races.

- 1854 - 1
- 1855 - 14
- 1856 - 29
- 1857 - 43
- 1858 - 34
- 1859 - 21
- 1860 - 24
- 1861 - 23
- 1862 - 23

== Major wins ==
(United Kingdom) Great Britain

- Epsom Derby - Kettledrum (1861)

== Bibliography ==
- Mortimer, Roger; Onslow, Richard; Willett, Peter (1978). Biographical Encyclopedia of British Flat Racing. Macdonald and Jane’s. ISBN 0-354-08536-0.
