= Ralph Bullock =

Ralph Bullock may refer to:

- Ralph Bullock, founder of Bullocks Coaches
- Ralph Bullock (jockey) (1841–1863), British jockey who won the 1861 Epsom Derby
