= Aldcroft =

Aldcroft is a surname. Notable people with the surname include:

- Thomas Aldcroft (1835–1883), British jockey
- Zoe Aldcroft (born 1996), English rugby union player

== See also ==
- Allcroft, surname
