= Rayon d'Or =

French-bred Thoroughbred racehorse

- Sire: Flageolet
- Grandsire: Plutus
- Dam: Araucaria
- Damsire: Ambrose
- Sex: Stallion
- Foaled: 1876
- Country: France
- Colour: Chestnut
- Breeder: Haras de Dangu
- Owner: Frédéric Lagrange (France); William L. Scott (USA)
- Trainer: Tom Jennings, Sr.
- Record: 23: 17-2-3
- Earnings: F500,000+

Major wins
- Lavant Stakes (1878); Newmarket Glasgow Stakes (1878); Clearwell Stakes (1878); Challenge Stakes (1879); Champion Stakes (1879); Great Foal Stakes (1879); Sussex Stakes (1879); Zetland Stakes (1879); St. James's Palace Stakes (1879); Prix du Cadran (1880); Prix Rainbow (1880); Rous Memorial Stakes (1880); British Classic Race wins: St. Leger Stakes (1879)

Awards
- Leading sire in North America (1889)
- Last updated on January 6, 2010

Rayon d'Or (1876–1896) was a French Thoroughbred racehorse and Champion sire in the United States. Bred by Frédéric Lagrange at his Haras de Dangu stud farm in Dangu, Eure, he was sired by Flageolet whose wins included the Prix Morny (1872), Goodwood Cup (1873) and Jockey Club Cup (1873) and whom Rayon d'Or would help make the Leading sire in Great Britain and Ireland in 1879. Rayon d'Or's dam was the good producing mare Araucaria, sired by Ambrose. Araucaria was the last foal of the mare Pocahontas whom Thoroughbred Heritage says is "one of the most influential thoroughbreds of all time, male or female."

Rayon d'Or was conditioned for racing by Tom Jennings, Sr., a member of the pioneering English Racing Colony at Chantilly, Oise. Jennings was the trainer of Gladiateur, winner of the British Triple Crown in 1865.

Rayon d'Or raced from age two through four, winning important races in England and France at distances of one mile to mile and a quarter such as the Sussex and Champion Stakes, and at endurance distances such as the 4,000 meter Prix du Cadran at Longchamp Racecourse and the Prix Rainbow at 5,000 meters. Rayon d'Or's most important win came in the Classic St. Leger Stakes.

== Stud record ==
Rayon d'Or was retired to stud at Haras de Dangu, where he sired only a few foals before being sold in the dispersal of the Haras de Dangu horses in November 1882. He was purchased by American businessman, and former member of the United States House of Representatives, William Scott. Rayon d'Or was brought to the United States to stand at Scott's Algeria Stock Farm at Erie, Pennsylvania, where he sired most of his major winners. In 1889 he became the first French-bred stallion to top the American leading sires list. Scott died in 1892, and the Algeria Stud was dispersed. Rayon d'Or was purchased by August Belmont Jr. who stood him at his Nursery Stud in Kentucky.

Rayon d'Or notably sired:

- Tea Tray (b. 1885) - won Monmouth Handicap (1890)
- Gypsy Queen (b. 1886) - won Spinaway Stakes (1888), Gazelle Stakes (1889)
- Tenny (b. 1886) - won Brooklyn Handicap (1890)
- Chaos (b. 1887) - won the 1889 Futurity Stakes
- Banquet (b. 1887) - on July 18, 1890, he set a new North American record of 2:03.75 for a mile and a quarter on dirt. Won 1891 Monmouth Handicap, 1892 Manhattan Handicap
- Liza (b. 1892) - won Swift Stakes (1894), Travers Stakes (1895)
- Soufflé (b. 1893) - in 1896 she won the Kentucky Oaks, Latonia Oaks, and Jerome Handicap. Named the retrospective American Champion Three-Year-Old Filly
- Don de Oro (b. 1894) - won Tremont Stakes (1896), Kenner Stakes (1897)
- Octagon (b. 1894) - won Toboggan Handicap (1897, 1898), Withers Stakes (1897), Brooklyn Derby (1897). Sire of U.S. Racing Hall of Fame filly, Beldame.

Through his daughter, St Priscilla, Rayon d'Or was the damsire of the horse Stromboli.

Rayon d'Or died at Nursery Stud on July 15, 1896 at age twenty.

== Sire line tree ==
- Rayon d'Or
  - Marauder
  - Tea Tray
  - Chaos
  - Tenny
    - David Tenny
    - Race King
  - Banquet
  - Bolero
  - Don de Oro
  - Octagon
    - Aurumaster
    - Woodsaw
    - Norman
    - Amoureux
  - Firearm
  - His Lordship
  - Brigadier
  - Kilogram
  - Red Path

== Pedigree ==
Pedigree of Norman (USA), bay stallion, 1905
Sire Flageolet (FR) 1870	Plutus (GB); 1863	Trumpeter	Orlando*
Sire Flageolet (FR) 1870	Plutus (GB); 1863	Trumpeter	Cavatina
Sire Flageolet (FR) 1870	Plutus (GB); 1863	Britannia	Planet
Sire Flageolet (FR) 1870	Plutus (GB); 1863	Britannia	Alice Bray
Sire Flageolet (FR) 1870	La Favorite (FR); 1863	Monarque	The Emperor
Sire Flageolet (FR) 1870	La Favorite (FR); 1863	Monarque	Poetess
Sire Flageolet (FR) 1870	La Favorite (FR); 1863	Constance	Gladiator
Sire Flageolet (FR) 1870	La Favorite (FR); 1863	Constance	Lanterne
Dam Araucaria (GB) 1862	Ambrose (GB); 1849	Touchstone*	Camel*
Dam Araucaria (GB) 1862	Ambrose (GB); 1849	Touchstone*	Banter*
Dam Araucaria (GB) 1862	Ambrose (GB); 1849	Annette	Priam
Dam Araucaria (GB) 1862	Ambrose (GB); 1849	Annette	Don Juan mare
Dam Araucaria (GB) 1862	Pocahontas (GB); 1837	Glencoe	Sultan
Dam Araucaria (GB) 1862	Pocahontas (GB); 1837	Glencoe	Trampoline
Dam Araucaria (GB) 1862	Pocahontas (GB); 1837	Marpessa	Muley
Dam Araucaria (GB) 1862	Pocahontas (GB); 1837	Marpessa	Clare

* Rayon d'Or is inbred 5S x 3D to the stallion Touchstone, meaning that he appears fifth generation (via Orlando) on the sire side of his pedigree, and third generation on the dam side of his pedigree.
