= Musa (horse) =

British-bred Thoroughbred racehorse

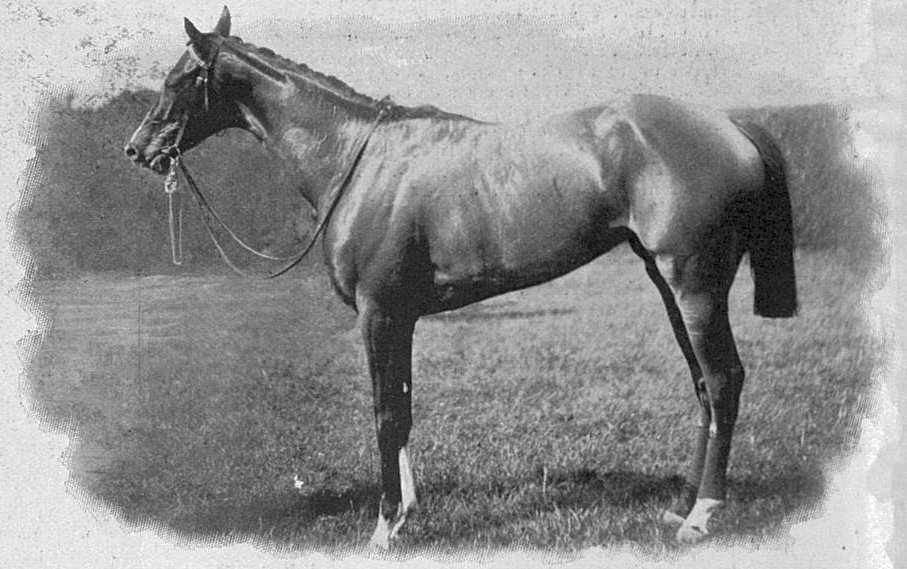
- Musa in 1899
- Sire: Martagon
- Grandsire: Bend Or
- Dam: Palmflower
- Damsire: The Palmer
- Sex: Mare
- Foaled: 1896
- Country: United Kingdom
- Colour: Bay
- Owner: Douglas Baird
- Trainer: Harry Enoch
- Record: 7: 1-2-2 232-3100

Major wins
- Oaks Stakes (1899)

Musa (1896 – 1920) was a British Thoroughbred racehorse and broodmare. As a two-year-old in 1898, she failed to win but showed great promise by being placed in several major races including the New Stakes. In the following spring, she finished third in the 1000 Guineas before winning the Epsom Oaks. She ran unplaced in two subsequent starts and was retired from racing at the end of the year. She had considerable success as a broodmare.

== Background ==
Musa was a bay mare bred in England. During her racing career she was owned by Douglas Baird and trained by Harry Enoch.

She was sired by Martagon, a stayer whose biggest wins came in the Goodwood Cup and Queen's Vase before going on to sire the Snow Marten and Wool Winder. Her dam Palmflower was an influential broodmare who was the ancestor of numerous major winners and is regarded as the foundation mare of Thoroughbred family 20-c.

== Racing career ==
=== 1898: two-year-old season ===
In her first major race Musa contested the New Stakes over five and a half furlongs at Royal Ascot on 16 June. Starting at odds of 7/2 she led for most of the way before being overtaken in the closing stages and beaten three quarters of a length by the colt Flying Fox. At Goodwood Racecourse on 28 July Musa finished third behind Eventail and St Gris in the Prince of Wales' Stakes over six furlongs. On 13 October at Newmarket Racecourse Musa started favourite for the Prendergast Stakes but was beaten 1 1/2 lengths into second place by the American-bred filly Myakka.

=== 1899: three-year-old season ===
Musa began her second season in the 1000 Guineas over the Rowley Mile at Newmarket on 28 April 1899 in which she started at odds of 100/7 and finished third of the thirteen runners behind Sibola and Fascination.

In the 121st running of the Oaks Stakes over 1 1/2 miles at Epsom Racecourse on 2 June, Musa, ridden by Otto Madden, started a 20/1 outsider in a twelve-runner field. Sibola started favourite while the other fancied runners included Princess Mary, Janitza, Fairy Gold and Victoria May. After tracking the leaders for most of the way she slipped through on the inside to take the lead and held off the challenge of Sibola to win by a head. The ride of the American jockey Tod Sloan on the runner-up was widely criticised and Musa was considered a somewhat lucky winner.

On 29 June at Newmarket Musa was matched against male opposition and older horses in the Princess of Wales's Stakes and finished unplaced behind Flying Fox. In the Newmarket Oaks over fifteen furlongs on 10 October Musa ran unplaced behind Gadfly.

== Breeding record ==
Musa was retired from racing to become a broodmare for her owner's stud before being moved to France in 1909. She produced eight foals, including three top-class winners, from 1901 to 1915 and died in 1920.

- Mousqueton, a bay colt, foaled in 1901, sired by Carbine. Won Sussex Stakes
- Sweet Vernal, bay filly, 1904, by Sainfoin
- Feramorz, bay colt, 1908, by St Frusquin
- Mirska, bay filly, 1909, by St Frusquin. Won Epsom Oaks.
- Montviette, bay filly, 1910, by William the Third
- Malaquais, bay colt, 1911, by Rabelais
- Montmaur, bay colt, 1912, by Rabelais
- Montmartin, bay colt, 1915, by Cadet Roussel. Won Prix du Jockey Club and Grand Prix de Paris

== Pedigree ==
Pedigree of Musa (IRE), bay mare, 1896
Sire Martagon (GB) 1887	Bend Or; 1877	Doncaster	Stockwell
Sire Martagon (GB) 1887	Bend Or; 1877	Doncaster	Marigold
Sire Martagon (GB) 1887	Bend Or; 1877	Rouge Rose	Thormanby
Sire Martagon (GB) 1887	Bend Or; 1877	Rouge Rose	Ellen Horne
Sire Martagon (GB) 1887	Tiger Lily; 1875	Macaroni	Sweetmeat
Sire Martagon (GB) 1887	Tiger Lily; 1875	Macaroni	Jocose
Sire Martagon (GB) 1887	Tiger Lily; 1875	Polly Agnes	The Cure
Sire Martagon (GB) 1887	Tiger Lily; 1875	Polly Agnes	Miss Agnes
Dam Palmflower (GB) 1874	The Palmer; 1864	Beadsman	Weatherbit
Dam Palmflower (GB) 1874	The Palmer; 1864	Beadsman	Mendicant
Dam Palmflower (GB) 1874	The Palmer; 1864	Madame Eglentine	Cowl
Dam Palmflower (GB) 1874	The Palmer; 1864	Madame Eglentine	Diversion
Dam Palmflower (GB) 1874	Jenny Diver; 1866	Buccaneer	Wild Dayrell
Dam Palmflower (GB) 1874	Jenny Diver; 1866	Buccaneer	Little Red Rover mare
Dam Palmflower (GB) 1874	Jenny Diver; 1866	Fairy	Warlock
Dam Palmflower (GB) 1874	Jenny Diver; 1866	Fairy	Leila (Family: 20-c)
