= Sibola =

American-bred Thoroughbred racehorse

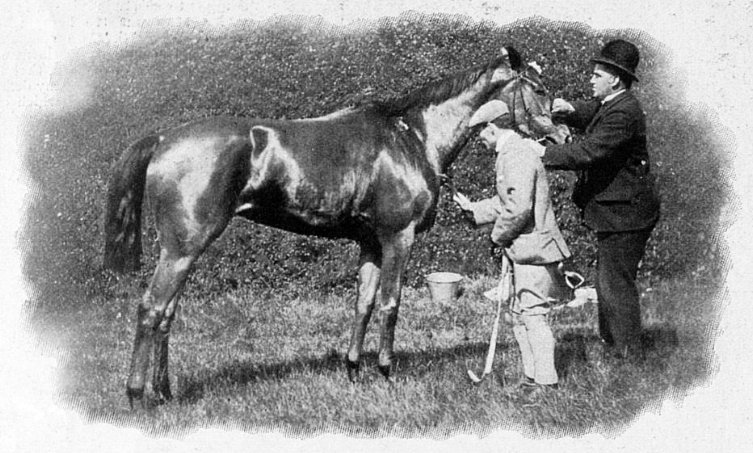
- Sibola being groomed before the 1899 Epsom Oaks.
- Sire: The Sailor Prince
- Grandsire: Albert Victor
- Dam: Saluda
- Damsire: Mortemer
- Sex: Mare
- Foaled: 1896
- Country: United States
- Colour: Bay
- Breeder: Pierre Lorillard IV
- Owner: Pierre Lorillard IV; Lord William Beresford; Eustace Loder
- Trainer: John Huggins
- Record: 13: 5-4-0 (incomplete)

Major wins
- Wood Ditton Stakes (1899); 1000 Guineas (1899); Derby Biennial Foal Stakes (1899); Scarborough Stakes (1899)

Sibola (1896–1921) was an American-bred, British-trained Thoroughbred racehorse and broodmare. She was sent to England as a yearling and showed some promise as a two-year-old in 1898 although she failed to win a race. In the following year, she was the most successful filly of her age in England, taking the Wood Ditton Stakes, 1000 Guineas, Derby Biennial Foal Stakes and Scarborough Stakes as well as finishing a close and unlucky second in the Epsom Oaks. She remained in training until the age of five but never recovered her best form. As a broodmare she had an enduring influence on the breed as the female-line ancestor of Nearco.

== Background ==
Sibola was a bay mare bred in the United States by Pierre Lorillard IV. As a yearling she was sent to England where she was sent into training with John Huggins.

She was sired by Sailor Prince, a British stallion who won the Cambridgeshire Handicap in 1886 before being exported to the United States to become a breeding stallion. On his arrival in America his name was slightly amended and during his stud career he was known as The Sailor Prince. Sibola's 2nd dam Perfection was a full sister to the leading American racehorse Parole.

== Racing career ==
=== 1898: two-year-old season ===
On 6 May, Sibola contested the £3,100 Royal Plate over five furlongs at Kempton Park Racecourse when she was ridden by the veteran Charles Wood and finished unplaced behind the Prince of Wales's filly Eventail. On her only other start of the year she finished second to Queen Fairy in the Bedford Plate at Newmarket Racecourse.

In December 1898 Sibola was offered for sale along with several other Lorillard horse and was bought by Lord William Beresford.

=== 1899: three-year-old season ===
Sibola began her second season in the Wood Ditton Stakes at Newmarket Racecourse on 12 April. Ridden by the American jockey Tod Sloan she started 11/10 favourite, led from the start, and "in a canter" by three lengths. Over the Rowley Mile at Newmarket on 28 April 1899, Sibola, again ridden by Sloan, started the 13/8 favourite for the 86th running of the 1000 Guineas with the best fancied of her thirteen opponents being Myakka (Prendergast Stakes), Strike A Light and Victoria May (Lavant Stakes). Sibola led for most of the way and won easily by three lengths from Fascination with two lengths back to Musa in third place.

The American filly was stepped up in distance to contest the Oaks Stakes over one and a half miles at Epsom Racecourse on 2 June. She was made the 4/7 favourite despite suffering from a mouth abscess and being distracted by a cat which was released onto the track. She was facing the wrong way at the start and was left behind the other runners after which Sloan rushed her up to join the leaders after half a mile, using up much of the filly's energy in the process. She lost more ground by running wide entering the straight before finishing strongly and was beaten a head by the 20/1 outsider Musa. Sloan was criticised for riding a very poor race, while Sibola was considered a most unlucky loser. On her next appearance Sibola started 3/1 second favourite for the £2425 Lingfield Park Stakes over one mile on 7 July and finished second, beaten one and a half lengths by the colt Harrow.

At Derby Racecourse in early September Sibola returned to winning form in the one-mile Biennial Foal Stakes, beating the colt Flambard by three-quarters of a length with Musa unplaced. In the Scarbrough Stakes at Newmarket in late October the filly started 2/7 favourite against three opponents and won very easily by three lengths after leading from the start.

Sibola won one other race in 1899. Her winnings for the year totaled £5,804, making her the third most successful horse of the season behind Flying Fox and Democrat.

=== Later career ===
Sibola remained in training for two more seasons but recorded no further major wins. In December 1900 she was offered for sale and was bought for 1,950 guineas by Major Eustace Loder. In May 1901 she finished second to the outsider Ninus in the March Stakes over ten furlongs at Newmarket. In the same year she finished unplaced in the Esher Stakes, London Gold Cup and Royal Hunt Cup.

== Breeding record ==
At the end of her racing career, Sibola became a broodmare for Loder's Eyrefield Lodge Stud. She produced at least seven foals between 1903 and 1920:

- Gripenberg, a bay colt, foaled in 1903, sired by Count Schomberg.
- Baltinglass, bay colt, 1904, by Isinglass. Runner-up in the St Leger.
- Gallus, chestnut colt, 1906, by Gallinule.
- Canvas-Back, bay filly, 1908, by Gallinule.
- Catnip, bay filly, 1910, by Spearmint. Female-line ancestor of numerous major winners in Europe, most notably Nearco.
- Sunith, chestnut colt, 1912, by Sundridge.
- Cresson, chestnut colt, 1920, by Coriander (exported to India).

Sibola was destroyed in 1921.

== Pedigree ==
Pedigree of Sibola (USA), bay mare, 1896
Sire The Sailor Prince (GB) 1880	Albert Victor; 1868	Marsyas	Orlando
Sire The Sailor Prince (GB) 1880	Albert Victor; 1868	Marsyas	Malibran
Sire The Sailor Prince (GB) 1880	Albert Victor; 1868	The Princess of Wales	Stockwell
Sire The Sailor Prince (GB) 1880	Albert Victor; 1868	The Princess of Wales	The Bloomer
Sire The Sailor Prince (GB) 1880	Hermita; 1871	Hermit	Newminster
Sire The Sailor Prince (GB) 1880	Hermita; 1871	Hermit	Seclusion
Sire The Sailor Prince (GB) 1880	Hermita; 1871	Affection	Lifeboat
Sire The Sailor Prince (GB) 1880	Hermita; 1871	Affection	Rose d'Amour
Dam Saluda (USA) 1883	Mortemer (FR); 1865	Compiegne	Fitz Gladiator
Dam Saluda (USA) 1883	Mortemer (FR); 1865	Compiegne	Maid of Hart (GB)
Dam Saluda (USA) 1883	Mortemer (FR); 1865	Comtesse	Nuncio (GB)
Dam Saluda (USA) 1883	Mortemer (FR); 1865	Comtesse	Eusebia (GB)
Dam Saluda (USA) 1883	Perfection; 1875	Leamington (GB)	Faugh-a-Ballagh (IRE)
Dam Saluda (USA) 1883	Perfection; 1875	Leamington (GB)	Pantaloon mare
Dam Saluda (USA) 1883	Perfection; 1875	Maiden	Lexington
Dam Saluda (USA) 1883	Perfection; 1875	Maiden	Kitty Clark (Family: 4-r)
