= Billy Bullock =

Personal information
- Born: 1884/85 Morpeth, Northumberland
- Died: 1963
- Occupation: Jockey

Horse racing career
- Sport: Horse racing

Major racing wins
- Major race wins: Oaks Stakes (1908); Derby Stakes (1908); Dewhurst Stakes (1907)

Significant horses
- Rhodora, Signorinetta

Charles William Bullock was a Classic winning flat racing jockey, who in 1908 gained the rare distinction of having won the Derby and Oaks on the same horse, Signorinetta. He was also four times champion jockey of Denmark.

== Early life ==
Bullock was from a racing family in the North of England. His grandfather and brother were both racehorse trainers, his father was a greyhound trainer and his uncle, Ralph Bullock had won the 1861 Derby shortly before his untimely death.

== Career ==
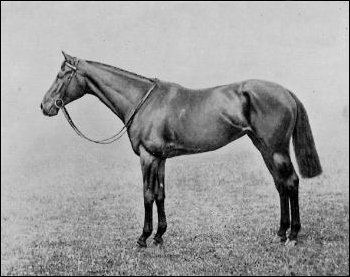
Signorinetta

Bullock was apprentice to trainer Tom Bruckshaw in Middleham, North Yorkshire. However, owner/breeder/trainer Edoardo Ginistrelli gave him his greatest success by giving him the ride on Signorinetta in the Classics of 1908. As the only filly in the Derby, she started at odds of 100/1, but took the lead entering the final two furlongs and won easily by two lengths. In 2002, the result was rated by The Observer as one of the ten greatest shocks in sporting history.

Two days later, she started the Oaks at odds of 3/1, behind favourite Rhodora, who had beaten her in the 1000 Guineas and on whom Bullock had won the previous season's Dewhurst Stakes. This time she won by 3/4 length and Ginistrelli was personally congratulated by the King. For his role in the victories Bullock only received his riding fees, a glass of wine and a cigar.

After World War I, Bullock moved to Denmark where he became the leading jockey in four consecutive years, 1924-1927. During this period, he also won the 1926 Swedish Derby. He briefly returned to England in 1928, but two years later moved to ride in Germany. His last major victory was the 1933 Northumberland Plate on Leonard. He continued to work as a work rider until 1959 when he was in his seventies. On his death in 1963, his final employer Charles Elsey stated, "He was a delightful horseman. Horses that did not go for others went very well for him. We feel we have lost a very good friend."

== Major wins ==
(United Kingdom) Great Britain

- Oaks Stakes – Signorinetta (1908)
- Derby Stakes – Signorinetta (1908)
- Dewhurst Stakes – Rhodora (1907)

== See also ==
- List of jockeys

== Bibliography ==
- Mortimer, Roger; Onslow, Richard; Willett, Peter (1978). Biographical Encyclopaedia of British Racing. London: Macdonald and Jane's. ISBN 0-354-08536-0.
