= Rosedrop =

British-bred Thoroughbred racehorse

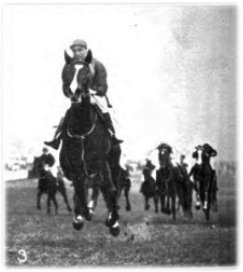
- Rosedrop winning the Oaks
- Sire: St. Frusquin
- Grandsire: St. Simon
- Dam: Rosaline
- Damsire: Trenton
- Sex: Mare
- Foaled: 1907
- Country: United Kingdom
- Colour: Chestnut
- Breeder: J A Doyle
- Owner: Sir William Bass, 2nd Baronet
- Trainer: Alec Taylor, Jr.
- Record: 11: 4-2-1
- Earnings: £6,353 (in 1909)

Major wins
- Oaks Stakes (1910); Atalanta Stakes (1910); Great Yorkshire Stakes (1910)

Rosedrop (1907–1930) was a British Thoroughbred racehorse and broodmare. She won one minor race as a two-year-old in 1909 before emerging as a top-class performer in the following year. She won the Epsom Oaks, Atalanta Stakes and Great Yorkshire Stakes as well as finishing third in the 1000 Guineas and the Park Hill Stakes. After her retirement from racing she became a broodmare in England, and later in the United States. By far the best of her offspring was Gainsborough who won the 13th U.K. Triple Crown Champion and became a very successful breeding stallion.

== Background ==
Rosedrop was a chestnut mare bred in England by John Doyle and owned during her racing career by Sir William Bass, 2nd Baronet who bought her as a yearling for 700 guineas. She was sent into training with Alec Taylor, Jr. at Manton, Wiltshire.

She was sired by St. Frusquin who won the Middle Park Plate, Dewhurst Plate, 2000 Guineas, Princess of Wales's Stakes and Eclipse Stakes and was described as one of the best horses of the 19th century. His other progeny included St. Amant, Quintessence, and Mirska. Her dam Rosaline showed so little promise that her owner Jack Barnato Joel donated her to charity auction in aid of the Fresh Air Fund at which she was sold for 25 guineas by William Allison. Allison sold the mare by John Doyle for 200 guineas and on Doyle's death she was acquired for 900 guineas by J. Simons Harrison in a deal which also included her filly foal (Rosedrop). She came from a successful family, being descended from the influential British broodmare May Queen (foaled 1868).

== Racing career ==
=== 1909: two-year-old season ===
Until 1913, there was no requirement for British racehorses to have official names and two-year-olds were allowed to run without names until 1946. The practice of running horses unnamed had once been common, but had largely fallen out of use by the early 20th Century. Rosedrop however was not officially named until 1910, and ran as a juvenile under the descriptive title of Sir W. Bass's chestnut filly by St Frusquin - Rosaline.

The filly ran twice as a two-year-old in 1909, recording one win in the Rangemore Maiden Stakes at Derby Racecourse.

=== 1910: three-year-old season ===
The filly was still unnamed when he ran in the 1000 Guineas over the Rowley Mile at Newmarket Racecourse on 29 April and finished third of the thirteen runners behind Winkipop and Maid of Corinth (who was also owned by Bass). She was then officially given the name Rosedrop. It was reported that the filly finished unplaced in a minor race in May.

On 3 June Rosedrop was moved up in distance to contest the 132nd Oaks Stakes over one and a half miles at Epsom Racecourse. Winkipop started favourite with Rosedrop on 7/1 in an eleven-runner field which also included Maid of Corinth. Ridden by Charlie Trigg she dominated the race from the start and won "in a common canter" by four lengths from Evolution, with Pernelle a neck away in third.

At Royal Ascot eleven days later Rosedrop was matched against male opposition in the Gold Vase over two miles and finished unplaced behind the colt Charles O'Malley. In July she coped well with the exceptionally wet conditions to win the Atalanta Stakes at Sandown Park. At the Newbury summer meeting she led for most of the way in the Kingclere Stakes but was caught in the last stride and narrowly beaten by the colt Lonawand, to whom she was conceding weight. Rosedrop reversed the form in the Great Yorkshire Stakes at York in August, winning from Willonyx (later to win the Ascot Gold Cup) with Lonawand in third place. On 7 September at Doncaster Racecourse Rosedrop took on colts in the St Leger but made little impact and finished unplaced behind Swynford. Later at the same meeting she finished second to Yellow Slave in the Park Hill Stakes.

Rosedrop ended the year with earnings of £6,353.

=== 1911: four-year-old season ===
Rosedrop remained in training as a four-year-old in 1911. On 10 May at Newmarket she was put up for auction and bought for 4,500 guineas by Alfred W. Cox. She did not race in 1911 and was retired at the end of the year.

== Assessment and honours ==
In their book, A Century of Champions, based on the Timeform rating system, John Randall and Tony Morris rated Rosedrop a "poor" winner of the Oaks.

== Breeding record ==
At the end of her racing career Rosedrop became a broodmare for Lady James Douglas. She was later exported to the United States. She produced at least six foals and two winners between 1914 and 1927:

- La Tosca, a bay filly, foaled in 1914, sired by Bayardo
- Gainsborough, bay colt, 1915, by Bayardo. Won 13th U.K. Triple Crown Champion.
- Baydrop, bay colt, 1918, by Bayardo
- Cottingham, chestnut colt, 1920, by Lemberg
- Mere Play, chestnut colt, 1925, by Fair Play. Winner in the United States.
- Rosern, chestnut filly, 1927, by Mad Hatter. Failed to win in ten races in the United States.

Rosedrop died in 1930.

== Pedigree ==
Pedigree of Rosedrop (GB), chestnut mare, 1907
Sire St. Frusquin (GB) 1893	St. Simon; 1881	Galopin	Vedette
Sire St. Frusquin (GB) 1893	St. Simon; 1881	Galopin	Flying Duchess
Sire St. Frusquin (GB) 1893	St. Simon; 1881	St. Angela	King Tom
Sire St. Frusquin (GB) 1893	St. Simon; 1881	St. Angela	Adeline
Sire St. Frusquin (GB) 1893	Isabel; 1879	Plebeian	Joskin
Sire St. Frusquin (GB) 1893	Isabel; 1879	Plebeian	Queen Elizabeth
Sire St. Frusquin (GB) 1893	Isabel; 1879	Parma	Parmesan
Sire St. Frusquin (GB) 1893	Isabel; 1879	Parma	Archeress
Dam Rosaline (GB) 1901	Trenton (NZ); 1881	Musket (GB)	Toxophilite
Dam Rosaline (GB) 1901	Trenton (NZ); 1881	Musket (GB)	West Australian mare
Dam Rosaline (GB) 1901	Trenton (NZ); 1881	Frailty (AUS)	Goldsbrough
Dam Rosaline (GB) 1901	Trenton (NZ); 1881	Frailty (AUS)	Florence McIvor
Dam Rosaline (GB) 1901	Rosalys; 1894	Bend Or	Doncaster
Dam Rosaline (GB) 1901	Rosalys; 1894	Bend Or	Rouge Rose
Dam Rosaline (GB) 1901	Rosalys; 1894	Rosa May	Rosicrucian
Dam Rosaline (GB) 1901	Rosalys; 1894	Rosa May	May Queen (Family: 2-n)
