= Norman (horse) =

American-bred Thoroughbred racehorse

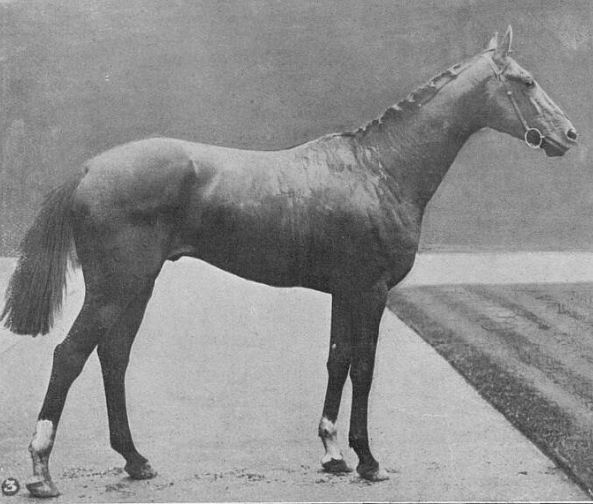
- Norman in 1908.
- Sire: Octagon
- Grandsire: Rayon d'Or
- Dam: Nineveh
- Damsire: The Ill-Used
- Sex: Stallion
- Foaled: 1905
- Country: United States
- Colour: Bay
- Breeder: August Belmont Jr.
- Owner: August Belmont Jr.
- Trainer: John Watson
- Record: 15: 4-1-3 (incomplete)

Major wins
- Exeter Stakes (1907); 2000 Guineas (1908); Newmarket St Leger (1908)

Norman (also known as Norman III, 1905 – after 1918) was an American-bred, British-trained Thoroughbred racehorse and sire. He was exported from the United States as a yearling and showed some promise as a juvenile in 1907 when he won twice from nine starts. In the following spring he recorded a 25/1 upset victory in the 2000 Guineas. He was unplaced when favourite for the Epsom Derby and finished last in the St Leger but ended his second season with a victory in the Newmarket St Leger. He raced for another two seasons but never recaptured his classic winning form. He made no impact as a breeding stallion.

== Background ==
Norman was a bay horse bred in the United States by his American owner August Belmont Jr. Like several major American owners Belmont had moved most of his hoses to Europe following the passing of the Hart–Agnew Law. The colt was sent to England as a yearling and entered training with John Watson at the Palace House stable in Newmarket in Suffolk.

Both of Norman's parents were bred and owned by Belmont. He was sired by the Kentucky-bred stallion Octagon whose wins included the Toboggan Handicap, Withers Stakes and Brooklyn Derby. His dam Nineveh was a descendant of the broodmare Mildred, making her a relative of Kalitan and Souffle (Kentucky Oaks).

== Racing career ==
=== 1907: two-year-old season ===
Norman ran nine times as a two-year-old in 1907. He won two races, including the Exeter Stakes, and finished third twice. When tried against top-class opposition in the Dewhurst Stakes over seven furlongs at Newmarket Racecourse in October he finished unplaced behind the filly Rhodora.

=== 1908: three-year-old season ===
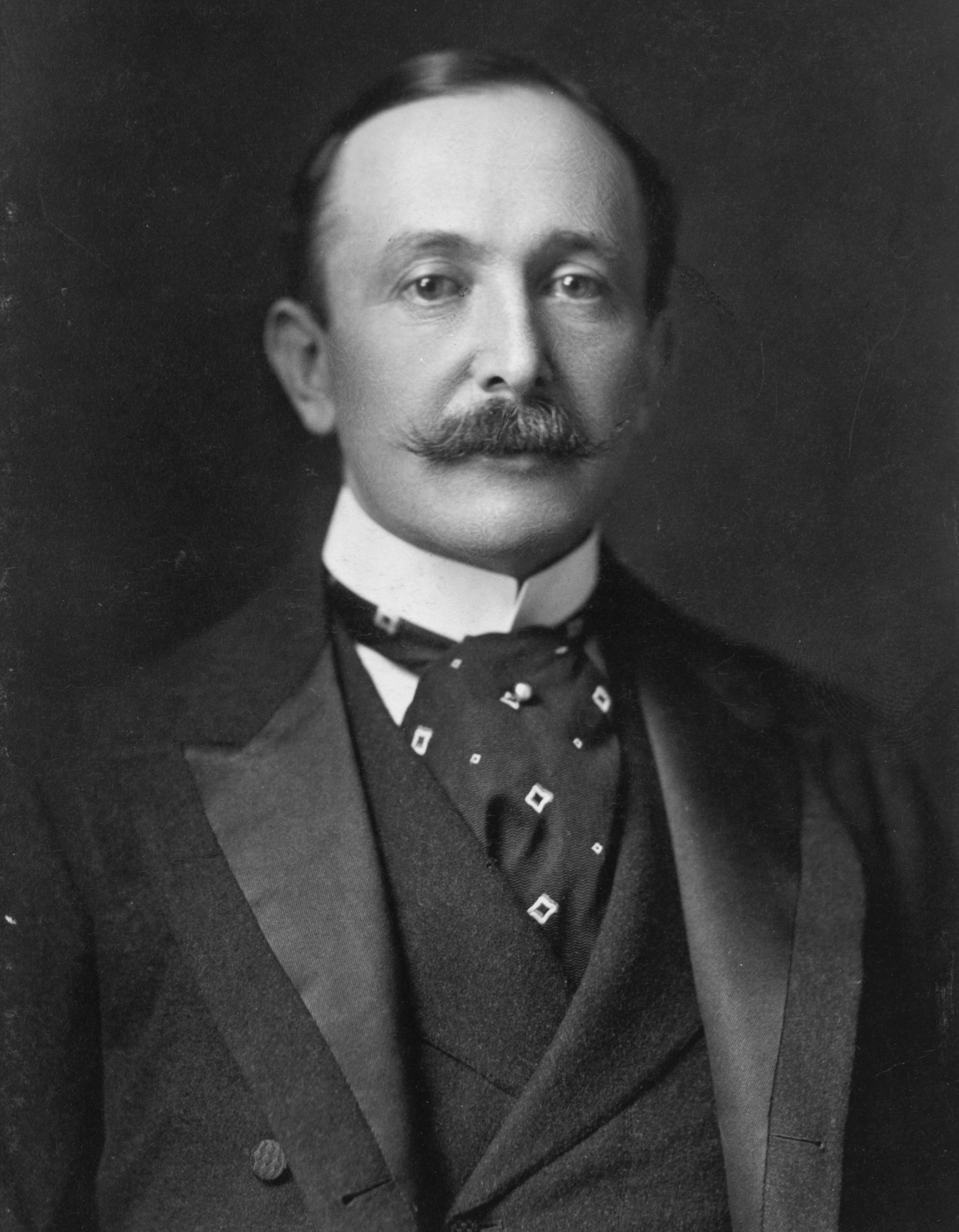
August Belmont, Jr., who owned and bred Norman

On 6 May 1908 Norman started a 25/1 outsider against sixteen opponents for the 100th running of the 2000 Guineas over the Rowley Mile at Newmarket. Ridden by Otto Madden he upset the odds as he took the lead in the last quarter mile and drew away to win "easily" by three lengths clear of Sir Archibald with White Eagle three quarters of a length back in third. The result of the race saw Norman promoted to the position of favourite for the Epsom Derby.

In the Derby over one and a half miles at Epsom Racecourse on 3 June Norman started the 11/2 favourite and was againpartneed by Madden. He was in second place at half way but then faded out of contention and finished fifteenth of the eighteen runners behind the 100/1 outsider Signorinetta. In September he was fancied to run well in the St Leger but made no impact as he came home last of the ten runners behind Your Majesty. In October, the colt returned to winning form when he took the Newmarket St Leger over one and three-quarter miles.

=== Later career ===
Norman remained in training for at least two more years but failed to win any more major races. In March 1910 he finished third behind Cinderella and Forerunerr in the Lincolnshire Handicap. Later that month, he placed second when being picked as a favourite for the Newark Plate at Nottingham Racecourse.

== Assessment and honours ==
In their book, A Century of Champions, based on the Timeform rating system, John Randall and Tony Morris rated Norman a "poor" winner of the 2000 Guineas.

== Stud record ==
After his retirement from racing Norman was exported to become a breeding stallion at the Abony Stud in Hungary. He had no success as a sire of winners.

== Pedigree ==
Pedigree of Norman (USA), bay stallion, 1905
Sire Octagon (USA) 1894	Rayon d'Or (FR); 1876	Flageolet	Plutus (GB)
Sire Octagon (USA) 1894	Rayon d'Or (FR); 1876	Flageolet	Le Favorite
Sire Octagon (USA) 1894	Rayon d'Or (FR); 1876	Araucaria (GB)	Ambrose
Sire Octagon (USA) 1894	Rayon d'Or (FR); 1876	Araucaria (GB)	Pocahontas*
Sire Octagon (USA) 1894	Ortegal (GB); 1889	Bend Or	Doncaster*
Sire Octagon (USA) 1894	Ortegal (GB); 1889	Bend Or	Rouge Rose
Sire Octagon (USA) 1894	Ortegal (GB); 1889	Lizzie Agnes	Macaroni
Sire Octagon (USA) 1894	Ortegal (GB); 1889	Lizzie Agnes	Polly Agnes
Dam Nineveh (USA) 1892	The Ill-Used (GB); 1870	Breadalbane	Stockwell*
Dam Nineveh (USA) 1892	The Ill-Used (GB); 1870	Breadalbane	Blink Bonny
Dam Nineveh (USA) 1892	The Ill-Used (GB); 1870	Ellermire	Chanticleer (IRE)
Dam Nineveh (USA) 1892	The Ill-Used (GB); 1870	Ellermire	Ellerdale
Dam Nineveh (USA) 1892	Semiramis (USA); 1888	St Blaise (GB)	Hermit
Dam Nineveh (USA) 1892	Semiramis (USA); 1888	St Blaise (GB)	Fusee
Dam Nineveh (USA) 1892	Semiramis (USA); 1888	Sultana	Lexington
Dam Nineveh (USA) 1892	Semiramis (USA); 1888	Sultana	Mildred (Family: 12-b)

* Norman is inbred 4S x 6S x 5D to the mare Pocahontas, meaning that she appears fourth generation and sixth generation (via Doncaster) on the sire side of his pedigree, and fifth generation (via Stockwell) on the dam side of his pedigree.

* Norman is inbred 5S x 4D to the stallion Stockwell, meaning that he appears fifth generation (via Doncaster) on the sire side of his pedigree, and fourth generation on the dam side of his pedigree.
