= Allcroft =

Allcroft or Alcroft is a surname. Notable people with the surname include:

== Allcroft ==
- Britt Allcroft (1943–2024), English-American producer, writer, and director
- John Derby Allcroft (1822–1893), English entrepreneur and politician
- Philip Magnus-Allcroft (1906–1988), British biographer

== Alcroft ==
- Jamie Alcroft (born 1949), American comedian and voice actor
- Hayley Kiyoko (full name Hayley Kiyoko Alcroft; born 1991), American singer and actress
- Jack Allen (full name John William Alcroft Allen; 1903–1957), English footballer
- Kelsey Alcroft, fictional character from Hollyoaks

== See also ==
- Aldcroft, surname
