= St. Frusquin =

British-bred Thoroughbred racehorse

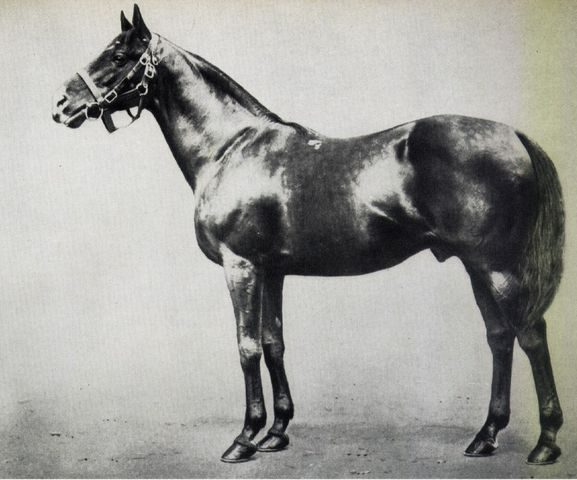
- Sire: St. Simon
- Grandsire: Galopin
- Dam: Isabel
- Damsire: Plebeian
- Sex: Stallion
- Foaled: 1893
- Country: United Kingdom
- Colour: Brown
- Breeder: Leopold de Rothschild
- Owner: Leopold de Rothschild
- Trainer: Alfred Hayhoe
- Record: 11:9-2-0
- Earnings: £32,965

Major wins
- Middle Park Plate (1895); Dewhurst Plate (1895); 2000 Guineas (1896); Princess of Wales's Stakes (1896); Eclipse Stakes (1896)

St. Frusquin (1893–1914) was a British Thoroughbred racehorse and sire. In a racing career that lasted from May 1895 to July 1896, he ran eleven times and won nine races. He was the best British two-year-old of 1895 when his five wins included the Middle Park Plate and the Dewhurst Plate. As a three-year-old, he added wins in the 2000 Guineas and two of the season's most valuable all-aged races: the Princess of Wales's Stakes and the Eclipse Stakes. He had a notable rivalry with Persimmon, who shared the same sire and was another outstanding British colt whom St. Frusquin defeated in two of their three racecourse meetings.

== Background ==
St. Frusquin was a brown colt with a white star and snip, bred by his owner, Leopold de Rothschild, a banker, philanthropist and member of the prominent Rothschild family. St. Frusquin was sired by St. Simon, one of the best racehorses of his era who became a dominant stallion, being Champion sire on nine occasions between 1890 and 1901. St. Simon also sired Persimmon, St. Frusquin's chief rival in his racing career.

St. Frusquin's dam Isabel was a successful racehorse, winning eleven races before being retired to stud, where the best of her other progeny was the Richmond Stakes winner St. Gris. Rothschild sent St. Frusquin to Alfred Hayhoe, who trained his horses at the Palace House stables at Newmarket, Suffolk.

The colt was not named after a Christian saint but after an informal French expression for the entirety of a person's possessions.

== Racing career ==
=== 1895: two-year-old season ===
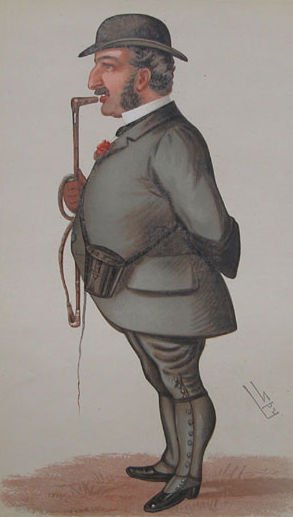
Leopold de Rothschild, St. Frusquin's owner

St. Frusquin made his first appearance on 10 May when he won the £3,000 Royal Two-Year-Old Plate over five furlongs at Kempton. Ridden by Tommy Loates, who became his most regular jockey, he showed inexperience by hanging to the left after taking the lead but held on to win by a neck from Gulistan. He followed up with victories in the £2,000 Sandringham Cup at Sandown on 27 June, beating Labrador easily by three lengths, and the Chesterfield Stakes at Newmarket on 18 July before an attack of rheumatism interrupted his season.

St. Frusquin returned to the racecourse on 4 October with a run in the £5,000 Imperial Produce Stakes over six furlongs at Kempton in which he carried the top weight. He finished second after a "gallant effort", failing by half a length against Teufel, who was carrying twelve pounds fewer. His next race, one week later, was one of the season's most important two-year-old races, the Middle Park Plate over six furlongs at Newmarket in which he was matched against the Prince of Wales's highly regarded colt Persimmon. With Loates unavailable, he was ridden by the twenty-year-old Frederick Pratt, a nephew of Fred Archer. St. Frusquin tracked the leaders before overtaking the filly Omladina inside the final furlong and winning "very cleverly" by half a length, with the favourite Persimmon a further four lengths away in third. At the next Newmarket meeting on 24 October, St. Frusquin confirmed his position as "the best youngster in England" by winning the Dewhurst Plate over seven furlongs. In this race, he conceded weight to his four opponents and won by three lengths from Knight of the Thistle despite being eased down by Pratt in the closing stages. becoming the fifth horse to complete the Middle Park-Dewhurst double after Chamant, Friar's Balsam, Donovan and Orme.

Apart from his ability, St. Frusquin was also praised for his attitude, being described as "a thorough sticker, who wins his races through sheer hard finishing". His winnings for the season totaled £9,622 and he entered the winter break as 11/4 favourite for the following year's Derby, ahead of Persimmon and the Duke of Westminster's colt Regret, who was being talked of "a second Ormonde".

=== 1896: three-year-old season ===
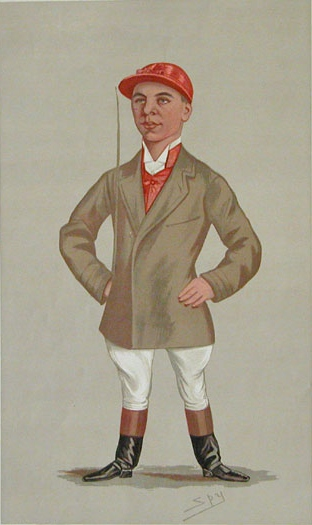
Tommy Loates, St. Frusquin's regular jockey

Discussion regarding the relative merits of St. Frusquin, Persimmon and Regret continued over the winter, with each horse having supporters and critics. St. Frusquin began his three-year-old season by winning the Column Produce Stakes at Newmarket on April, making "mincemeat" of the opposition despite conceding at least thirteen pounds to the other runners. He next ran in the 2000 Guineas two weeks later. With both Persimmon and Regret withdrawn from the race after performing poorly in training, St. Frusquin was made one of the shortest-priced favourites in the history of the Classics, starting at the unusual odds of 12/100. Tommy Loates sent him into the lead halfway through the one-mile race, and his opponents were soon struggling. In the closing stages, St. Frusquin drew away to win "very easily" by at least three lengths from Love Wisely (who won the Ascot Gold Cup in June), with Labrador another three lengths back in third. Some critics, however, pointed out that St. Frusquin had been least effective in the downhill section of the race and might therefore struggle on the contours of the Derby course. The ground at Newmarket in the spring of 1896 was reported to be "like iron", a fact put forward later in the season as a contributory factor in St. Frusquin's career-ending injuries.

At Epsom on 3 June, St. Frusquin faced ten opponents in the 117th running of the Derby. He was made favourite at 8/13, with Persimmon, having his first run of the year, being the second choice on 5/1. St. Frusquin was towards the back of the field in the early stages but soon moved up to join the leaders and turned into the straight in second place behind Bay Ronald. Tommy Loates sent St. Frusquin into the lead two furlongs out and was immediately challenged by Jack Watts on Persimmon. St. Frusquin ran on strongly under pressure, but after a "fine race" Persimmon prevailed by a neck, with a winning time of 2:42.0 that set a new course record. The close finish was one of the earliest horse races ever captured on film. Loates was reportedly hampered by a broken stirrup strap in the final stages. One rumour, which stated that Rothschild had instructed that St. Frusquin should not be trained to peak fitness for the race in order to facilitate a "Royal" victory, was both reported and attacked in the British press.

St. Frusquin and Persimmon met for the third time a month later in the £10,000 Princess of Wales's Stakes over one mile at Newmarket. On this occasion, St. Frusquin received three pounds from his rival but conceded nine pounds to Regret, who started favourite. The field also included the 1895 Classic winners Kirkconnel and Sir Visto. St. Frusquin was restrained by Loates in the early stages before moving forward to overtake Persimmon in the straight and after a "very exciting" race during which he displayed "the utmost gameness" he defeated the Derby winner by half a length, with Regret third. Two weeks later, on 17 July, St. Frusquin ran in the year's second "Ten-Thousand-Pounder", the Eclipse Stakes over ten furlongs at Sandown Park Racecourse. With Persimmon being rested in preparation for the St. Leger Stakes, St. Frusquin started 1/2 favourite against Regret, Labrador and the four-year-old Troon. According to press reports, St. Frusquin was fitted with specially designed, cushioned shoes in the race to protect his hooves on the hard ground. At one point, Regret opened up an apparently decisive lead, and St. Frusquin appeared unsettled by having dust kicked up into his face, but Loates produced the favourite with a strong run in the straight to overtake Regret and win "very cleverly" by one and a half lengths, taking his winnings for the year to £23,343. Shortly after his win at Sandown, St. Frusquin was being prepared for the St Leger when he was injured in training, sustaining serious injuries to the suspensory ligaments in his forelegs (initially reported as a tendon strain). He appeared to make a slight recovery, but then broke down completely and was retired to his owner's Southcourt Stud.

== Assessment ==
In August 1896, the Live Stock Journal described St. Frusquin as "one of the best horses of the century, his great courage and resolution making him worthy to compare with Isinglass, Donovan and Ormonde."

== Stud career ==
During his time as a stallion Southcourt Stud, where he initially stood at a fee of 200 guineas, St. Frusquin proved a highly successful sire of winners. He sired the Derby winner St. Amant, the 1000 Guineas winners Rhodora, Quintessence, and Flair, and The Oaks winners Rosedrop and Mirska. He was Britain's Champion sire in 1903 and 1907 and the leading broodmare sire in 1924. St Frusquin was destroyed on 25 August 1914 after a medical condition rendered him incapable of continuing his stud duties. His body was donated to the Natural History Museum.

== Sire line tree ==
- St Frusquin
  - Fortunatus
    - Posinatus
  - St Alwyne
    - Night Watch
    - Poitrel
      - Belgamba
  - Barcadaile
    - Vermouth
  - Rydal Head
    - Poethlyn
  - St Amant
  - Frustrum
    - Ballyboggan
  - Martin Lightfoot
    - Impudent Barney
  - St Wolf
    - Florilegio
    - Cad
    - Diogenes
    - Hijo Mio
    - Movedizo
    - Lombardo
    - Maron
    - Tagore
  - Cipango
    - Tipperary Tim
  - Greenback
    - Paper Money
  - St Just
    - Jus D'Orange
      - Orange Peel
        - Jus de Pomme
        - Plein d'Espoirs
        - The Last Orange
  - Pietri
  - St Anton
  - Lorenzo
  - Day Comet
    - Double Chance
  - Ecouen
  - St Cyr

== Pedigree ==
Pedigree of St Frusquin (GB), brown stallion, 1893
Sire St Simon (GB) 1881	Galopin; 1872	Vedette	Voltigeur
Sire St Simon (GB) 1881	Galopin; 1872	Vedette	Mrs Ridgeway
Sire St Simon (GB) 1881	Galopin; 1872	Flying Duchess	The Flying Dutchman
Sire St Simon (GB) 1881	Galopin; 1872	Flying Duchess	Merope
Sire St Simon (GB) 1881	St Angela; 1865	King Tom	Harkaway
Sire St Simon (GB) 1881	St Angela; 1865	King Tom	Pocahontas
Sire St Simon (GB) 1881	St Angela; 1865	Adeline	Ion
Sire St Simon (GB) 1881	St Angela; 1865	Adeline	Little Fairy
Dam Isabel (GB) 1879	Plebeian; 1872	Joskin	West Australian
Dam Isabel (GB) 1879	Plebeian; 1872	Joskin	Peasant Girl
Dam Isabel (GB) 1879	Plebeian; 1872	Queen Elizabeth	Autocrat
Dam Isabel (GB) 1879	Plebeian; 1872	Queen Elizabeth	Bay Rosalind
Dam Isabel (GB) 1879	Parma; 1864	Parmesan	Sweetmeat
Dam Isabel (GB) 1879	Parma; 1864	Parmesan	Gruyere
Dam Isabel (GB) 1879	Parma; 1864	Archeress	Longbow
Dam Isabel (GB) 1879	Parma; 1864	Archeress	Tingle (Family:22-b)
