= Tagalie =

British Thoroughbred racehorse

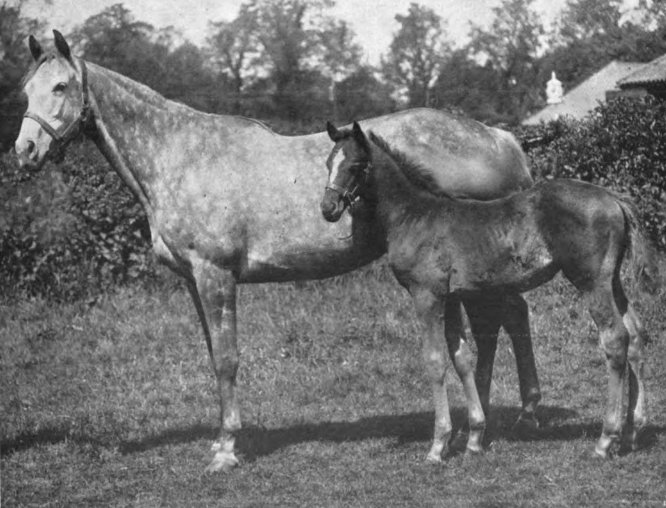
- Tagalie in 1915 with Sunstar filly, Mabella.
- Sire: Cyllene
- Grandsire: Bona Vista
- Dam: Tagale
- Damsire: Le Sancy
- Sex: Mare
- Foaled: 1909
- Country: United Kingdom of Great Britain and Ireland
- Colour: Grey
- Breeder: Walter Raphael
- Owner: Walter Raphael
- Trainer: Matthew Dawson Waugh
- Record: 13: 10-0-1
- Earnings: £

Major wins
- 1000 Guineas (1912); Epsom Derby (1912)

Tagalie (1909–1920) was a British Thoroughbred racehorse. She was one of only six fillies to win The Derby, and was also the second of only four greys to have won the race. She achieved this feat as a three-year-old in 1912, a year in which she had already won the 1000 Guineas. Although her Derby win was easy and impressive, she failed to reproduce her winning form in her three subsequent races.

== Background ==
Tagalie was a small, lightly framed grey filly ("more like a greyhound then a racehorse"), bred by her owner, the financier Walter Raphael. She was sired by Cyllene, an Ascot Gold Cup winner, who went on to become a highly successful stallion. In addition to Tagalie, he sired three other winners of The Derby and through his grandson, Phalaris, he is the direct male-line ancestor of most modern thoroughbreds. Her dam was the French-bred mare Tagale, from whom she inherited her grey coat. In addition to Tagalie, Tagale also produced the Gimcrack Stakes winner Blankney II.

Raphael sent the filly to his private trainer Matthew Dawson Waugh at his Somerville Lodge Stable at Newmarket, Suffolk.

== Racing career ==
=== 1911: two-year-old season ===
Tagalie showed some promise as a juvenile in 1911, despite not appearing on a racecourse until October. She won the Boscawen Post Stakes and was then sent to Newmarket for the Cheveley Park Stakes, the most important race of the season for British two-year-old fillies, in which she finished third to Belleisle. On her third and final start of the season she ran unplaced in a race at Sandown.

=== 1912: three-year-old season ===
On her three-year-old debut, Tagalie was sent straight for the 1000 Guineas on May 3 for which she started a 20/1 outsider. Ridden by the New Zealand jockey Les Hewitt she led from the start and won by one and a half lengths from Alope, with Belleisle third. Her winning time of 1:39.6 was the second fastest recorded up to that time. In the Newmarket Stakes on May 15 she proved herself capable of racing against colts when overcoming interference to finish an unlucky second to Cylgad.

As Hewitt was already committed to ride another horse in the Derby, Tagalie was ridden at Epsom on June 5 by the American Johnny Reiff. She started at odds of 100/8 in a field of twenty, in front of a large crowd which included the King and Queen. As at Newmarket, she led from the start, opened up a clear lead and was never in any danger. Reiff was even able to give the filly a "breather" just after half way before sending her clear again and winning "in a canter" by four lengths from Jaeger and Tracery. Two days later she started a "red-hot favourite" at odds of 1/2 for the Oaks, despite rumours that she would miss the race. On this occasion she was held up in the early stages by her new rider George Stern but took up the lead at half way and appeared to be going well. In the straight however, she appeared to tire badly and finished seventh behind Mirska. The only explanation offered was that she was unsuited by the state of the ground which had been softened by heavy rain since the Derby.

Tagalie never recaptured her Derby-winning form. Her meeting with the Ascot Gold Cup winner Prince Palatine in the Eclipse Stakes at Sandown on July 19 was anticipated as the potential "race of the season", but the filly ran poorly and was unplaced. Once again, there were some attempts to excuse her performance by claiming that she was unsuited by the soft ground, although another view was that her lack of stamina, which had not been truly tested in the Derby, had now been exposed. In an attempt to redeem her reputation and win an unconventional Triple Crown, Tagalie was sent to Doncaster in September for the St. Leger Stakes, but made no impression in finishing unplaced behind Tracery. She was then retired to stud, having earned £11,200 in her three-year-old season.

== Assessment ==
In their book A Century of Champions, John Randall and Tony Morris rated Tagalie the thirty-sixth best British filly or mare of the 20th Century .

== Breeding record ==
Tagalie produced only four foals, but they included Allenby, by Bayardo, who finished second by half a length to Tetratema in the 2000 Guineas and won the Newmarket Stakes in 1920. Tagalie died after giving birth in the same year.

== Pedigree ==
Pedigree of Tagalie (GB), grey filly, 1909
Sire Cyllene (GB) 1895	Bona Vista; 1889	Bend Or	Doncaster
Sire Cyllene (GB) 1895	Bona Vista; 1889	Bend Or	Rouge Rose
Sire Cyllene (GB) 1895	Bona Vista; 1889	Vista	Macaroni
Sire Cyllene (GB) 1895	Bona Vista; 1889	Vista	Verdure
Sire Cyllene (GB) 1895	Arcadia; 1887	Isonomy*	Sterling
Sire Cyllene (GB) 1895	Arcadia; 1887	Isonomy*	Isola Bella
Sire Cyllene (GB) 1895	Arcadia; 1887	Distant Shore	Hermit
Sire Cyllene (GB) 1895	Arcadia; 1887	Distant Shore	Lands End
Dam Tagale (FR) 1900	Le Sancy; 1885	Atlantic	Thormanby
Dam Tagale (FR) 1900	Le Sancy; 1885	Atlantic	Hurricane
Dam Tagale (FR) 1900	Le Sancy; 1885	Gem of Gems	Strathconan
Dam Tagale (FR) 1900	Le Sancy; 1885	Gem of Gems	Poinsettia
Dam Tagale (FR) 1900	The Other Eye; 1894	Common	Isonomy*
Dam Tagale (FR) 1900	The Other Eye; 1894	Common	Thistle
Dam Tagale (FR) 1900	The Other Eye; 1894	Jennie Winkle	Mr Winkle
Dam Tagale (FR) 1900	The Other Eye; 1894	Jennie Winkle	Jenny Diver(Family: 20-d)

- Tagalie was inbred 3x4 to Isonomy. This means that the stallion appears in both the third and fourth generations of her pedigree.
