= Tom Aldcroft =

British jockey

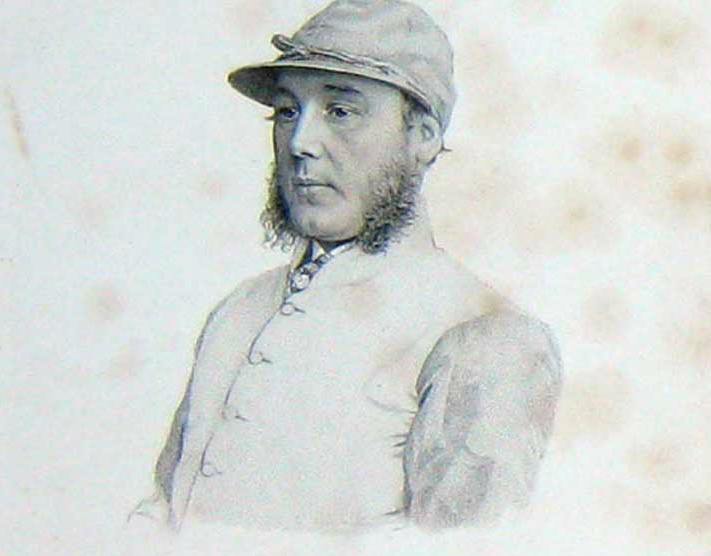
- Jockey Thomas Aldcroft from frontispiece of Baily's magazine 1862

Personal information
- Born: 1835
- Died: 1883 (aged 47–48)
- Occupation: Jockey

Horse racing career
- Sport: Horse racing

Major racing wins
- Major races 1,000 Guineas Stakes (1860); 2,000 Guineas Stakes (1855, 1864); Epsom Derby (1856); Epsom Oaks (1863); St Leger (1859)

Significant horses
- Ellington, Gamester, General Peel, Lord of the Isles, Queen Bertha, Sagitta

Thomas Aldcroft (1835–1883) was a British jockey who won each of the five British classics across his career.

== Early life ==
Aldcroft was born in Manchester in 1835. His father owned an omnibus company.

== Career ==
Aldcroft was apprenticed to Middleham trainer Tom Dawson, and got his big riding opportunity when Thomas Lye, the stable jockey, left his role in contentious circumstances. Aldcroft succeeded Lye, and quickly won a series of Classics for Dawson.

An early notable win came in the 1853 Chester Cup, but he rode his "greatest and finest race" early in his career for Dawson, when winning the 1855 2,000 Guineas on Lord of the Isles, aged 20. The horse went on to finish third in the Derby.

The following year, Aldcroft won the Derby for Dawson on Ellington at odds of 20/1, in heavy ground which produced the slowest time ever recorded for a Derby winner: 3 minutes, 5 seconds. The win, however, was marred by a rumour that Aldcroft had weighed out for his ride with a whip weighing seven pounds which he then switched for a virtually weightless one, thereby giving him a seven-pound advantage. Afterwards, he had switched back to the heavier whip to weigh back in. He would later ride Ellington's sister, Gildermire, into second honours in the 1858 Oaks. In the same year, he finished third in the Derby and second in the St Leger on The Hadji.

The following year, he registered his next Classic win, the 1859 St Leger, for trainer John Scott on Gamester, owned by Sir Charles Monck. For Scott, he also won the 1860 1,000 Guineas on Sagitta, and the 1863 Oaks, a race he "pulled out of the fire" on Queen Bertha.

Aldcroft was the first choice jockey of owner Lord Glasgow, and in 1864, Aldcroft won the 2,000 Guineas for Glasgow on General Peel. General Peel shortened in price from 20/1 to 7/2 in the final two weeks before the race, having been heavily backed. "The General" was then beaten to the 1864 Derby by Blair Athol. Lord Glasgow took issue with this defeat and as a result, Aldcroft lost the ride, with John Wells taking the mount in the St Leger.

Aldcroft and Glasgow had a strange relationship and frequently argued in a manner likened to "lovers' quarrels". Both were known to weep during arguments, and mutual friends were unable to rectify the situation. In one such incident, Glasgow accused Aldcroft of being in the pay of bookmaker John Jackson, without justification, and Aldcroft quit racing and retired to his home in Newmarket. Lord Glasgow later acknowledged his error and, as a goodwill gesture, left Aldcroft £500 in his will when he died in 1869.

He was invited back into racing by trainer Joseph Lawson, who trained at Bedford Lodge in Newmarket, with a ride on the well-regarded horse Miss Foote, but Aldcroft no longer had the confidence and was unable to mount a horse. According to one obituary, his final race had been on the Duke of Hamilton's filly Leonie in the Oaks of 1868.

Besides his Classic victories, Aldcroft had won the Goodwood Cup, Queen's Vase, Northumberland Plate and Cesarewitch Handicap amongst other big races.

== Riding style ==
Aldcroft was said to have fine hands and wonderful patience. His well-timed finish was compared to greats including Frank Butler, Jim Robinson, and Sam Chifney Jr. He was not so tall, and rode at 5st 7lb during his apprenticeship, but weight was a problem, with some attributing his departure from racing to increasing weight, rather than a dispute with Lord Glasgow.

== Personal life ==
In his prime, Aldcroft was a "handsome jockey" with "finely chiselled features" and black, bushy side-whiskers. He was considered a bit of a dandy. He married Jane Cartwright, daughter of the jockey who rode Beeswing, and lived with her in Newmarket at Grafton House on the High Street.

However, he was also a habitual smoker and years of heavy smoking took their effect on him. After a protracted illness, he died, aged 48, on 4 May 1883. He was buried in Newmarket Cemetery and his funeral was attended by contemporaries including James Goater and John Osborne Jr, as well as the new generation of jockeys including Fred Archer, and trainers including Mathew Dawson. His wife Jane was buried alongside him when she died on 31 August 1921, aged 77.

== Major wins ==
(United Kingdom) Great Britain

- 1,000 Guineas Stakes - Sagitta (1860)
- 2,000 Guineas Stakes - (2) - Lord of the Isles (1855), General Peel (1864)
- Epsom Derby - Ellington (1856)
- Epsom Oaks - Queen Bertha (1863)
- St Leger - Gamester (1859)
