= Octavius Vernon Harcourt =

British naval officer

Vice-Admiral Octavius Vernon Harcourt
- Born: Octavius Henry Cyril Vernon; 25 December 1793; Rose Castle, Cumberland
- Died: 14 August 1863 (aged 69); Swinton Park, Yorkshire
- Military career
- Allegiance: United Kingdom
- Branch: Royal Navy
- Service years: 1806–1836
- Rank: Vice-Admiral
- Commands: HMS Drake; HMS Carnation; HMS Britomart; HMS Primrose; HMS North Star
- Conflicts: Napoleonic Wars

Octavius Henry Cyril Vernon Harcourt (25 December 1793 – 14 August 1863) was a British naval officer. He was the eighth son of Edward Venables-Vernon-Harcourt, Archbishop of York, and began life as Octavius Henry Cyril Vernon at Rose Castle, Cumberland. On 15 January 1831, succeeding to the properties of William Harcourt, 3rd Earl Harcourt, the father's cousin, the family assumed the additional surname of Harcourt.

== Naval career ==
Harcourt entered the Royal Navy in August 1806 as a midshipman on board the 74-gun Tigre, under the command of Captain Benjamin Hallowell, and in 1807 took part in the expedition to Egypt, witnessing the surrender of Alexandria, and was employed on boat-service on the Nile. During the blockade of Toulon, he took part the action of October 1809 which led to the destruction of the French ships Robuste and Lion. After Hallowell's promotion to rear-admiral in August 1811, Harcourt followed him into Malta. He served in Malta in the Mediterranean, co-operating with the troops on the south-east coast of Spain, and serving in the batteries at the siege of Tarragona in 1813. He was promoted to lieutenant on 11 January 1814 and joined the Mulgrave under Captain Thomas James Maling. While off the coast of Italy, he landed with a party of seamen and marines near Piombino, captured a martello tower and brought out or destroyed a convoy which was anchored under its protection.

During the Hundred Days, Harcourt served aboard the frigate Amelia, under Captain the Honourable Granville Proby, in the blockade of Elba, and when the news of the defeat of Napoleon at Waterloo arrived, was sent with a Major of the Tuscan army to summon the town of Porto Ferrajo to hear the announcement. Amelia was paid off in December 1816, and Harcourt remained on half-pay until February 1818 when he was appointed to the Sir Francis Drake, the flagship of Sir Charles Hamilton, governor of Newfoundland. There, in February 1820, he was appointed commander of the sloop Drake, and also commanded the Carnation for a short time the same year. He then served in the West Indies, commanding Britomart from June 1824, and Primrose from May 1825, until finally returning to England in July 1827.

He was promoted to captain on 7 August 1827, and was selected by the Duke of Clarence, the Lord High Admiral, to act as his aide-de-camp aboard the royal yacht Royal Sovereign during an inspection tour to various naval ports. He received his last appointment in March 1834, commanding North Star, taking Hamilton Charles James Hamilton, the British Minister, to Buenos Aires, and then employed in surveying the coast of central America and the Californias, before finally returning home in October 1836.

On 26 October 1854 he was promoted to rear-admiral on half-pay, and on 10 June 1861 to vice-admiral on the retired list.

== Charitable works ==
He was appointed High Sheriff of Yorkshire for 1849. He built at his own expense and endowed a church at Healey, near Masham in North Yorkshire, another church at Brent Tor, Devonshire, and restored the parish church of Masham. In 1858 he erected in Masham six almshouses which he endowed with £1,775 three per cent Consols.

Harcourt's racehorse Ellington won The Derby in 1856.

== Marriage and death ==
He married, on 22 February 1838, Anne Holwell, second daughter of William Gater, and widow of William Danby of Swinton Park, near Masham in Yorkshire. He died at Swinton Park, Yorkshire, on 14 August 1863.

His widow Anne died on 26 June 1879, devising her Yorkshire estates to George, fifth son of Sir Robert Affleck, Bt., a relative of William Danby's mother, who then took the name Danby.

== See also ==
- O'Byrne, William Richard (1849). "Harcourt, Octavius Vernon" . A Naval Biographical Dictionary . John Murray – via Wikisource.
