= Ellington (horse) =

British-bred Thoroughbred racehorse

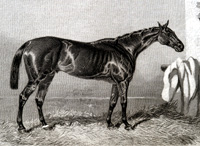
- Ellington. Contemporary etching by an unknown artist.
- Sire: The Flying Dutchman
- Dam: Ellerdale
- Damsire: Lanercost
- Sex: Stallion
- Foaled: 1853
- Country: United Kingdom of Great Britain and Ireland
- Colour: Brown
- Owner: Octavius Vernon Harcourt
- Trainer: Thomas Dawson
- Record: 10:3-3-0
- Earnings: £6,825

Major wins
- Champagne Stakes (1855); Epsom Derby (1856)

Ellington (1853 – 1869) was a British Thoroughbred racehorse and sire. In a career that lasted from 1855 to 1856 he ran eleven times and won four races. A leading two-year-old in 1855, when his wins included the Champagne Stakes at Doncaster, he won only one of his seven races the following year. That win, however, came in The Derby, where his ability to handle soft ground proved to be decisive. Ellington was retired to stud at the end of his three-year-old season, but had very little impact as a sire.

== Background ==
Ellington was a long, low brown horse standing 15.2½ hands high with a "coarse" head and unusually large feet. He was owned by Octavius Vernon Harcourt, an admiral in the Royal Navy. Ellington was trained at Middleham, North Yorkshire, by Thomas Dawson, the older brother of the more famous Mathew Dawson.

Ellington's sire, The Flying Dutchman was one of the outstanding horses of the mid-nineteenth century, winning fourteen of his fifteen races including the Derby and the St Leger. He became a moderately successful stallion in England but had much greater success after being exported to France. Ellington's dam Ellerdale was a notable broodmare, who also produced The Oaks winner Summerside and the Champagne Stakes winner Gildermire.

== Racing career ==
=== 1855: two-year-old season ===
As a two-year-old in 1855 Ellington began his career in August at York where he finished in fourth in the Eglington Stakes and then won the Sapling Stakes at the same meeting. In the latter race he went well clear and was winning so easily that his jockey, Thomas Aldcroft stopped riding and was almost caught on the line by Job Marson on Gildert. His most significant result came on 11 September when he contested the Champagne Stakes at Doncaster for which he started at odds of 10/1. He took the lead in the straight and won "cleverly" by three quarters of a length from Bird-in-Hand.

He was regarded as a contender for the following year's British Classic Races, and Admiral Harcourt turned down an offer of £4,000 for the colt. He spent the winter on Harcourt's estate, where he was reportedly used as a hack by the Admiral's coachman.

=== 1856: three-year-old season ===
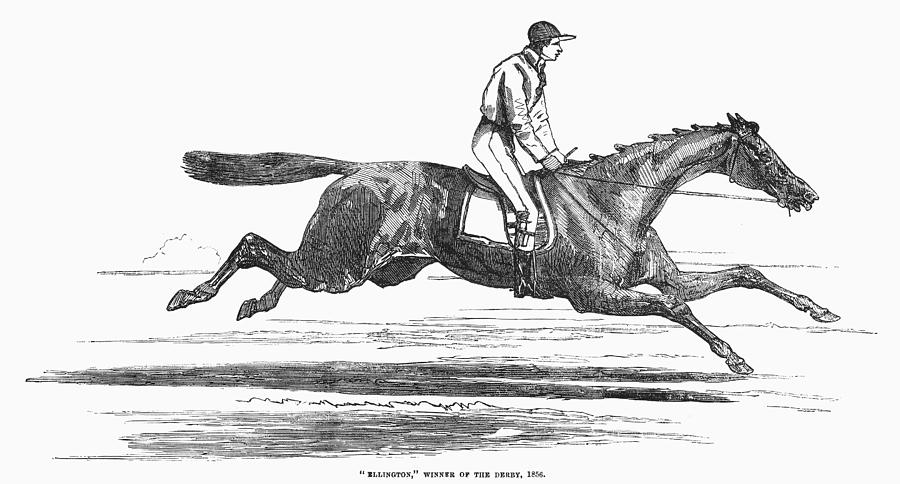
Ellington, from the Illustrated London News

Ellington made his first appearance of the year in a race at York in April. He was not fully fit and ran well to finish second by a head to Fisherman, a top class colt to whom he was conceding six pounds. In May he was sent to Chester where he started 4/6 favourite for the Dee Stakes but finished second of the nine runners behind Bird-in-Hand. His performance at Chester was disappointing as he seemed to "cut it" (give up) under pressure and it was only with difficulty that Dawson persuaded Admiral Harcourt to send him to Epsom for the Derby.

At Epsom on 4 June he started a 20/1 outsider in a field of twenty-four runners. Aldcroft rode a waiting race on Ellington, tracking the leaders and moving steadily closer in the straight before making his challenge inside the final furlong. He moved past the leader Yellow Jack in the closing stages and won comfortably by a length with the favourite Fazzoletto third. Ellington was one of the few horses to cope with the extremely soft ground: the winning time of 3:04.0 remains the slowest ever recorded.

Ellington was made 8/13 favourite for the St Leger at Doncaster, but finished well-beaten behind Warlock. Dawson offered no excuses for his colt's defeat although some felt that Aldcroft had ridden a poor race on the favourite, forcibly restraining him in the early stages instead of allowing him to gallop. At the same meeting two days later he started odds-on again for the one mile Don Stakes but was beaten a length and a half by the only other runner, Artillery. Later the same afternoon he turned out again for the Doncaster Stakes over one and a half miles, in which he carried top weight of 129 pounds and finished fourth of the six runners behind Bonnie Scotland. Later that autumn he was sent to Scotland and finished unplaced in the Roxburghe Handicap at Kelso on 21 October. He was then retired to stud.

== Assessment ==
Ellington was considered a good horse who had beaten a strong Derby field, but also a rather temperamental and unreliable performer.

== Stud career ==
Ellington stood as a stallion at Willesden Paddocks, Kilburn at a fee of 15 guineas, but failed to sire any horses of consequence. He had more success in an alternative career as a show-horse, winning a £100 first prize at the 1862 Royal Show. Ellington was bought by the king of Italy and exported in 1865. He died at the royal stud in 1869.

== Pedigree ==
Pedigree of Ellington (GB), brown stallion, 1853
Sire The Flying Dutchman (GB) 1846	Bay Middleton; 1833	Sultan	Selim
Sire The Flying Dutchman (GB) 1846	Bay Middleton; 1833	Sultan	Bacchante
Sire The Flying Dutchman (GB) 1846	Bay Middleton; 1833	Cobweb	Phantom
Sire The Flying Dutchman (GB) 1846	Bay Middleton; 1833	Cobweb	Filagree
Sire The Flying Dutchman (GB) 1846	Barbelle; 1836	Sandbeck	Catton
Sire The Flying Dutchman (GB) 1846	Barbelle; 1836	Sandbeck	Orvillina
Sire The Flying Dutchman (GB) 1846	Barbelle; 1836	Darioletta	Amadis
Sire The Flying Dutchman (GB) 1846	Barbelle; 1836	Darioletta	Selima
Dam Ellerdale (GB) 1844	Lanercost; 1835	Liverpool	Tramp
Dam Ellerdale (GB) 1844	Lanercost; 1835	Liverpool	Whisker mare
Dam Ellerdale (GB) 1844	Lanercost; 1835	Otis	Bustard
Dam Ellerdale (GB) 1844	Lanercost; 1835	Otis	Election mare
Dam Ellerdale (GB) 1844	Tomboy mare 1838	Tomboy	Jerry
Dam Ellerdale (GB) 1844	Tomboy mare 1838	Tomboy	Ardrossan mare
Dam Ellerdale (GB) 1844	Tomboy mare 1838	Tesane	Whisker
Dam Ellerdale (GB) 1844	Tomboy mare 1838	Tesane	Lady of the Tees (Family:18-a)
