= Signorinetta =

British-bred Thoroughbred racehorse

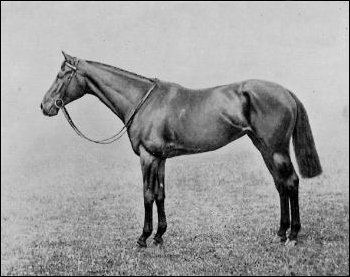
- Sire: Chaleureux
- Grandsire: Goodfellow
- Dam: Signorina
- Damsire: St Simon
- Sex: Mare
- Foaled: 1905
- Country: United Kingdom of Great Britain and Ireland
- Colour: Bay
- Breeder: Chevalier Edoardo Ginistrelli
- Owner: Chevalier Edoardo Ginistrelli
- Trainer: Cavaliere Edoardo Ginistrelli
- Record: 13:3-0-0
- Earnings: $58,005

Major wins
- British Classic Race wins: Epsom Derby (1908); Epsom Oaks (1908)

Signorinetta (1905–1928) was a British Thoroughbred racehorse and broodmare. In a racing career which lasted from 1907 to 1908 she ran thirteen times and won three races. Although most of her career was undistinguished she showed outstanding form at Epsom in the summer of 1908 when she won both the Derby and the Oaks. Trained by her eccentric and unconventional Italian owner, she won the Derby as a 100/1 outsider, creating one of the biggest upsets in racing history. After her retirement from racing she had some success as a broodmare.

== Background ==
Signorinetta was bred, owned and trained by Cavaliere Edoardo Ginistrelli (1833–1920), who had come to England from Italy in the early 1880s after selling his stud and stable near Mount Vesuvius. Signorinetta's dam, Signorina, was unbeaten in nine races, including the Middle Park Plate, as a two-year-old. She won two more races the following season and was runner up in the Oaks. As a four-year-old, she won the Lancashire Plate. As a brood-mare, she did not produce a live foal for 10 consecutive seasons, before foaling Signorino, a colt who was second in the 2000 Guineas and then third in the Derby.

At the same stables in Newmarket, Suffolk was a horse called Chaleureux, a nine guinea stallion, which was used as a 'teaser', that is, his job was to detect when mares came into season. Ginistrelli noticed that Signorina neighed to Chaleureux each day when he passed her box on his exercise round. He decided the two horses were in love and let them mate. In horse-breeding circles, allowing a prize mare to breed from an unregarded stallion was deemed total folly. However, Ginistrelli based his decision on the "boundless laws of sympathy and love". Signorinetta was the resultant foal. Rather than send his filly to a professional, Ginistrelli trained her himself at Newmarket.

== Racing record ==
=== 1907: two-year-old season ===
Signorinetta was unplaced in her first five races as a juvenile. Her only win was as a two-year-old in a nursery handicap at Newmarket. Ginistrelli's methods of training were subject to much laughter by other racing professionals.

=== 1908: three-year-old season ===
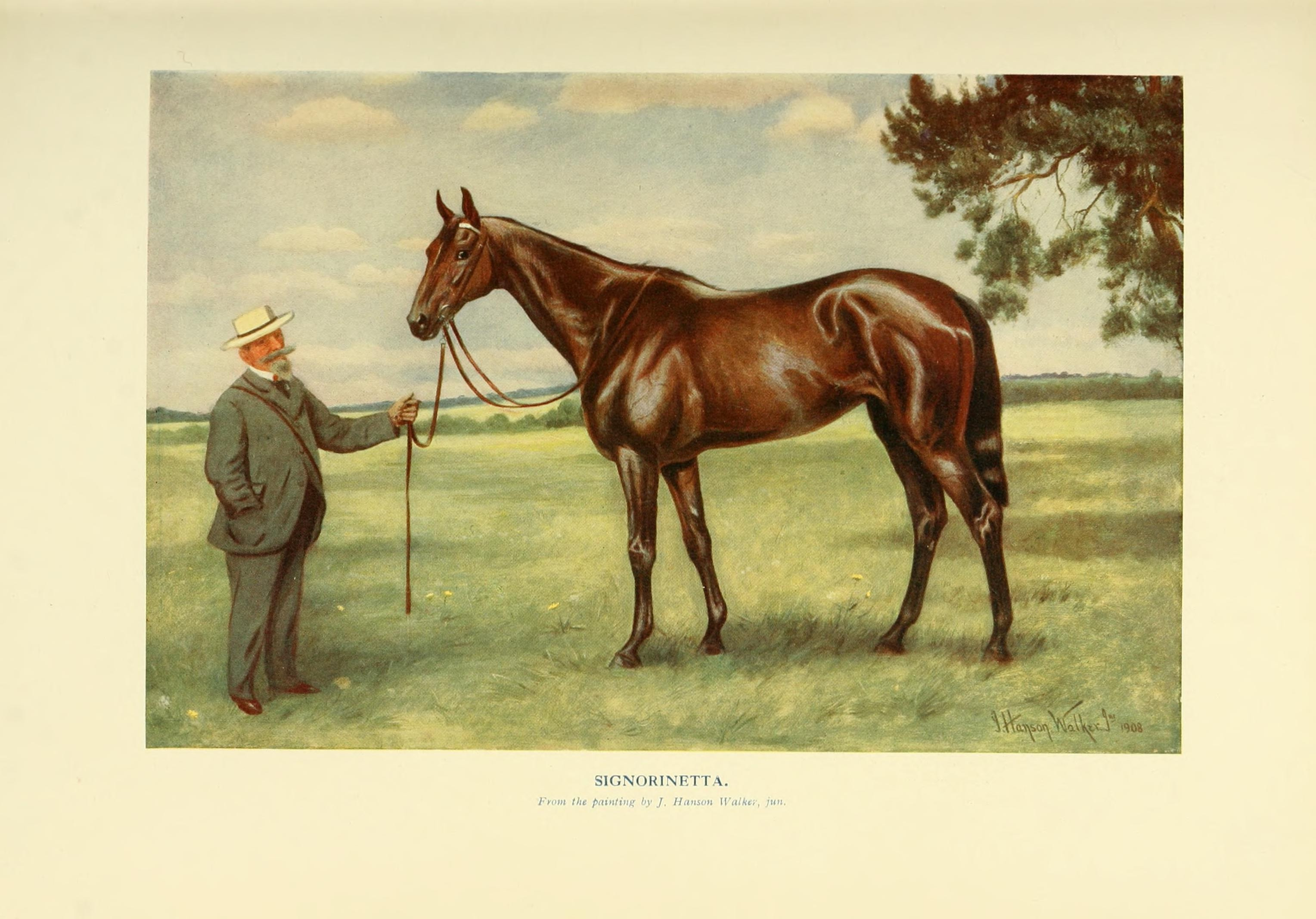
Portrait

Ginistrelli campaigned Signorinetta ambitiously from the start of the year. On her seasonal debut she ran in the 1000 Guineas at Newmarket and finished unplaced behind Rhodora. Two weeks later she ran against colts in the Newmarket Stakes over ten furlongs. She started at odds of 25/1 and finished fifth to Primer, running well for most of the way before fading in the closing stages.

A week before the Derby Lord Alfred Douglas dreamt that Signorinetta would win and so a placed a five-pound bet on her, despite friends telling him notto. On 3 June 1908, ridden by Billy Bullock, she started at odds of 100/1 against seventeen colts for the Derby in front of a huge crowd which included the King and Queen and several other members of the Royal Family. Signorinetta was not among the early leaders but she began to make rapid progress from half way and hit the front two furlongs from the finish. She was never in any danger of defeat and won easily by two lengths from Primer and Llangwm in a time of 2:39.8. Despite the mile and a half trip and the exceptionally hot weather, the filly looked as though she had hardly exerted herself afterwards; according to one report "she would not have blown a pinch of snuff off a sixpence". Signorinetta's time was considerably faster than that which was recorded by the Derby winners Ard Patrick, Diamond Jubilee and Rock Sand. To date Ginistrelli, along with Arthur Budgett are the only two successful owner/breeder/trainers of the Derby winner. Signorinetta was only the fourth filly to win the race and, as of 2025, only two fillies have won since. In 2002 The Observer rated her win as one of the ten greatest shocks in sporting history. She is only one of the three 100-1 Derby winners.

Two days after the Derby she attempted to become only the third filly to win the Derby and Oaks double. She started at odds of 3/1 against twelve fillies including Rhodora who started favourite. Half a mile into the race Signorinetta's task was made considerably easier when French Partridge fell and brought down Rhodora. Signorinetta raced in second place until the turn into the straight, when she moved into the lead and ran on strongly to win by three quarters of a length from Lord Falmouth's filly Courtesy, with Santeve third. In contrast to the silence which had initially greeted her win in the Derby, Signorinetta's second Classic win was greeted enthusiastically and Ginistrelli was personally congratulated by the King. Signorinetta then finished unplaced in her remaining three races. On her first start after Epsom, Signorinetta started 13/8 joint-favourite for the Royal Stakes over ten furlongs at Newbury but finished fourth to White Eagle, being apparently unsuited by the slow pace.

== Assessment ==
In their book A Century of Champions Tony Morris and John Randall rated Signorinetta a below average winner of the Oaks and the worst Derby winner of the 20th century arguing that Llangwm, Sea Sick, Norman, Sir Archibald and White Eagle all ran well below their best form in the Derby.

== Stud record ==
By 1911 Ginistrelli was a poor man, living modestly in Newmarket. He wanted to return to Italy and was able to do this by selling 'the apple of his eye'. In December 1911 Ginistrelli sold Signorinetta to Lord Rosebery. She had been put up for auction before but did not make her reserve price of 7,500 guineas. It was said when she was sold, the reserve price was 10,000 guineas. Signorinetta produced several foals that won £5,021, including:

- 1912 filly, Pasta by Thrush, dam of Hunting Song, six times Leading sire in New Zealand
- 1916 colt, Rizzio (GB) Cicero
- 1918 colt, The Winter King (by Son In Law), sire of Barneveldt (FR) won Grand Prix de Paris and sired Pont l'Eveque
- 1920 filly, Erycina by Lemberg, dam of four winners including Clydesdale Scottish Grand National

She died at the age of 23 in 1928.

== Pedigree ==
Pedigree of Signorinetta (GB), bay or brown mare, 1905
Sire Chaleureux B. 1894	Goodfellow; B. 1887	Barcaldine	Solon
Sire Chaleureux B. 1894	Goodfellow; B. 1887	Barcaldine	Ballyroe
Sire Chaleureux B. 1894	Goodfellow; B. 1887	Ravissante	Clanronald
Sire Chaleureux B. 1894	Goodfellow; B. 1887	Ravissante	Makeshift
Sire Chaleureux B. 1894	L'Ete; B. 1853	John Davis	Voltigeur
Sire Chaleureux B. 1894	L'Ete; B. 1853	John Davis	Jamaica
Sire Chaleureux B. 1894	L'Ete; B. 1853	Fandango mare (1862)	Fandango
Sire Chaleureux B. 1894	L'Ete; B. 1853	Fandango mare (1862)	Sleight of Hand mare (1849)
Dam Signorina Br. 1887	St. Simon; Br. 1881	Galopin	Vedette
Dam Signorina Br. 1887	St. Simon; Br. 1881	Galopin	Flying Duchess
Dam Signorina Br. 1887	St. Simon; Br. 1881	St. Angela	King Tom
Dam Signorina Br. 1887	St. Simon; Br. 1881	St. Angela	Adeline
Dam Signorina Br. 1887	Star of Portici; B. 1871	Heir At Law	Newminster
Dam Signorina Br. 1887	Star of Portici; B. 1871	Heir At Law	The Heiress
Dam Signorina Br. 1887	Star of Portici; B. 1871	Verbena	De Ruyter
Dam Signorina Br. 1887	Star of Portici; B. 1871	Verbena	Singleton Lass (Family: 23-a)
