= Quintessence (horse) =

British-bred Thoroughbred racehorse

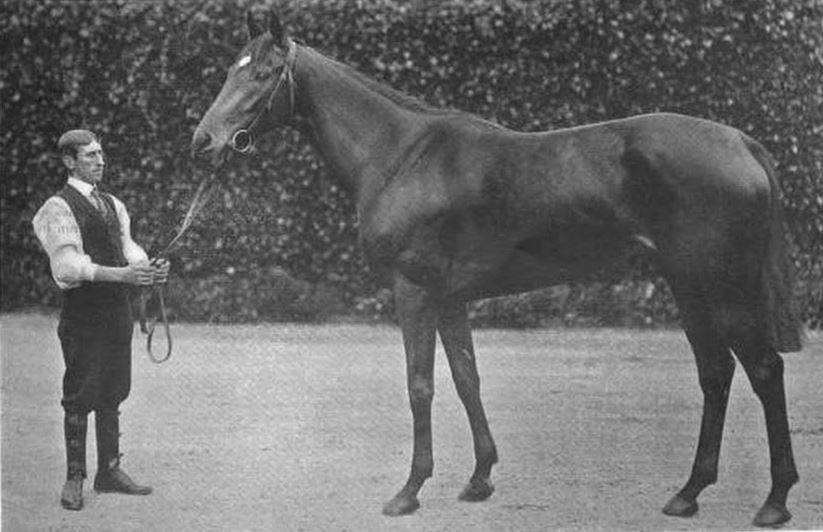
- Quintessence in 1903.
- Sire: St. Frusquin
- Grandsire: St. Simon
- Dam: Margarine
- Damsire: Petrarch
- Sex: Mare
- Foaled: 1900
- Country: United Kingdom of Great Britain and Ireland
- Colour: Bay
- Breeder: 7th Viscount Falmouth
- Owner: 7th Viscount Falmouth
- Record: 6: 6-0-0

Major wins
- Biennial Stakes (1902); Molecomb Stakes (1902); 1000 Guineas (1903); Park Hill Stakes (1903); Newmarket Oaks (1903)
- Last updated on 28 November 2012

Quintessence (1900–1917) was a British Thoroughbred racehorse who won the 1000 Guineas of 1903 and was unbeaten in her six races. She was owned and bred by Evelyn Edward Thomas Boscawen, 7th Viscount Falmouth. After retiring from racing, she became a successful broodmare, with her son Clarissimus winning the 2000 Guineas.

== Background ==
Quintessence was bay filly foaled in 1900 and bred by Evelyn Edward Thomas Boscawen, 7th Viscount Falmouth. She was a daughter of St. Frusquin, who won the 2000 Guineas and Eclipse Stakes in 1896. St Frusquin was also a successful sire and was Champion sire in Britain. His other progeny included St. Amant, 1000 Guineas winners Rhodora and Flair and Epsom Oaks winners Rosedrop and Mirska. Quintessence's dam, Margarine, was a daughter of 2000 Guineas winner Petrarch.

== Racing career ==
=== 1902: Two-year-old season ===
As a two-year-old Quintessence won the Biennial Stakes at Ascot. At Newmarket she won the six-furlong Exeter Stakes, with Sermon finishing second. On 1 August at Goodwood Quintessence won the Molecomb Stakes. She finished her two-year-old season unbeaten, with three wins from three starts.

=== 1903: Three-year-old season ===
On 1 May 1903, she faced 12 rivals in the 1000 Guineas at Newmarket and was ridden by Herbert Randall. Baroness La Fleche started the race as the 15/8 favourite. Also near the front of the betting was Skyscraper at 9/4, Quintessence at 4/1 and Hammerkop at 100/7. At the start three fillies - Sun Rose, Guigne and Hammerkop - got tangled in the webbing. In the early stages Skyscraper, Quintessence and Baroness La Fleche led the race on the left of the track, with another group of three just behind them racing down the centre of the track. With about two furlongs left to run Quintessence just headed Skyscraper. Sun Rose made progress through the field in the latter stages of the race, recovering from her poor start, but was unable to catch Quintessence. Quintessence won by one and a half lengths from Sun Rose, with Skyscraper in third place. Dazzling finished fourth, with favourite Baroness La Fleche finishing back in sixth place. After the race a protest was put in against the poor start, by Prince Soltykoff, the owner of Sun Rose. However, the protest was lodged a minute after the 15 minutes allowed for objections so could not be entered.

She was not entered for most of the major summer and early autumn stakes races due to her chronic problems with rheumatism. The cause of this malady was thought to be due to her habit of "tearing all the clothing off in her box." In September she won the Park Hill Stakes at Doncaster (with the Epsom Oaks winner Our Lassie unplaced) and the following month she beat three rivals to easily win the Newmarket Oaks, which was worth £450. She was retired to stud at the end of the 1903 season, finishing her career unbeaten in her six races.

== Stud career ==
Quintessence was retired to stud, where she became a successful broodmare. Her only classic winner was Clarissimus, by Radium, who was foaled in 1913 and won the 2000 Guineas in 1916. Her 1914 foal was Nonperail, a full sister to Clarissimus. She finished third in the 1000 Guineas. Her 1916 foal was Mountaineer, a bay horse by Polymelus. She died in 1917, ten days after foaling Paragon, another son of Radium. Paragon was successfully reared by a foster-mare that Lord Falmouth bought for £60 and he went on to win the City and Suburban Handicap at Epsom in 1922.

== Pedigree ==
Pedigree of Quintessence, bay mare, 1900
Sire St. Frusquin (GB) br. 1893	St. Simon b. 1881	Galopin b. 1872	Vedette
Sire St. Frusquin (GB) br. 1893	St. Simon b. 1881	Galopin b. 1872	Flying Duchess
Sire St. Frusquin (GB) br. 1893	St. Simon b. 1881	St. Angela b. 1865	King Tom
Sire St. Frusquin (GB) br. 1893	St. Simon b. 1881	St. Angela b. 1865	Adeline
Sire St. Frusquin (GB) br. 1893	Isabel ch. 1879	Plebeian b. 1872	Joskin
Sire St. Frusquin (GB) br. 1893	Isabel ch. 1879	Plebeian b. 1872	Queen Elizabeth
Sire St. Frusquin (GB) br. 1893	Isabel ch. 1879	Parma blk. 1864	Parmesan
Sire St. Frusquin (GB) br. 1893	Isabel ch. 1879	Parma blk. 1864	Archeress
Dam Margarine (GB) b. 1887	Petrarch b. 1873	Lord Clifden b. 1860	Newminster
Dam Margarine (GB) b. 1887	Petrarch b. 1873	Lord Clifden b. 1860	The Slave
Dam Margarine (GB) b. 1887	Petrarch b. 1873	Laura b. 1860	Orlando
Dam Margarine (GB) b. 1887	Petrarch b. 1873	Laura b. 1860	Torment
Dam Margarine (GB) b. 1887	Margarita b. 1873	The Duke b. 1862	Stockwell
Dam Margarine (GB) b. 1887	Margarita b. 1873	The Duke b. 1862	Bay Celia
Dam Margarine (GB) b. 1887	Margarita b. 1873	Tasmania br. 1854	Melbourne
Dam Margarine (GB) b. 1887	Margarita b. 1873	Tasmania br. 1854	Picaroon mare

Note: b. = Bay, blk. = Black, br. = Brown, ch. = Chestnut

== See also ==
- List of leading Thoroughbred racehorses
