= Mirska =

British Thoroughbred racehorse

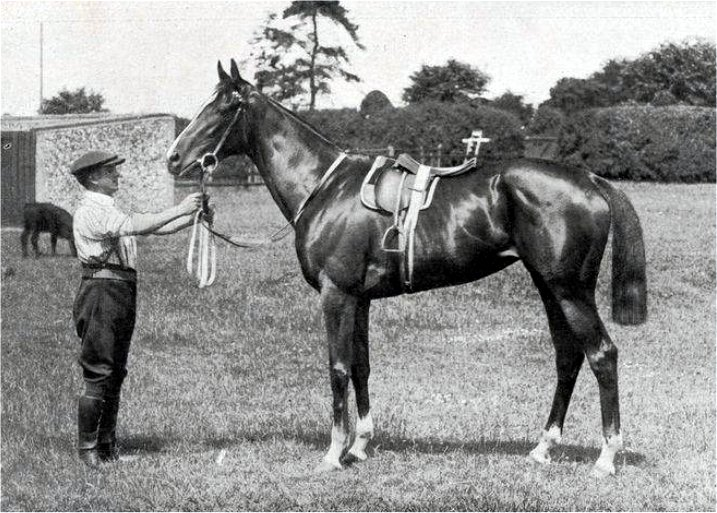
- Mirska at Prat's stud in France.
- Sire: St. Frusquin
- Grandsire: St. Simon
- Dam: Musa
- Damsire: Martagon
- Sex: Mare
- Foaled: 1909
- Country: United Kingdom of Great Britain and Ireland
- Colour: Bay
- Breeder: Douglas Baird
- Owner: Jean Prat
- Trainer: Tom Jennings, Jr.
- Record: 7:2-1-2
- Earnings: £4,950 (Oaks)

Major wins
- Epsom Oaks (1912)

Honours
- Prix Mirska in France

Mirska (1909 – after 1913) was a Thoroughbred racehorse that won the 1909 Epsom Oaks. Raced only three times in her lifetime, her only win occurred in the Oaks. Despite being a daughter of two English Classic winners, Mirska was not favoured to win the Oaks and won the race at 33-1 odds against the Derby winner and favourite Tagalie. She made no impact as a broodmare in France.

== Background ==
Mirska was bred by Douglas Baird. Mirska's sire St. Frusquin was an outstanding racehorse who won the 2000 Guineas and the Eclipse Stakes in 1896. As a stallion he was Leading sire in Great Britain and Ireland on two occasions and sired the Classic winners Rosedrop (1910 Epsom Oaks), Flair (1906 1000 Guineas) and Quintessence (1903 1000 Guineas). Mirska's dam, Musa, won the Oaks in 1899 for her owner Douglas Baird. After Baird's death in April 1909, Musa was bought by Jean Prat (c. 1848 – 1940), a French turfman, for 4,000 guineas. Musa and her nursing foal Mirska were sent to Prat's Lessard- le-Chêne stud in Saint-Julien-le-Faucon, France in 1909. Mirska's half-brother Montmartin was a sire in France and her full-brother Feramorz was a sire in New Zealand. Mirska was a bay filly with a narrow white strip and four white socks. She was trained at Newmarket by Tom Jennings Jr.

== Racing career ==
Mirska ran only three times in her racing career. As a two-year-old she was twice third and her only known race as a three-year-old was the Oaks. She was retired from racing immediately after the Oaks.

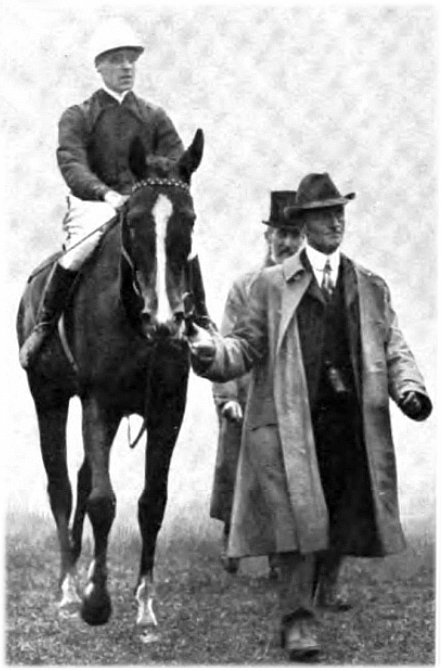
Mirska at the Oaks.

=== 1911: two-year-old season ===
Mirska was sent from France to Britain in 1911. Scratched from the Coventry Stakes in June, her first engagement was in the Clearwell Stakes run at Newmarket on 10 October. Though noted to be "attractively-bred" by the press, she was not looked on favorably by the racing public despite her excellent pedigree. Ridden by the French jockey Georges Stern, she finished third in the race behind J. B. Joel's colt Absurd and Khedive III. She was again third in the Maiden 2-year-old race at the Second October meeting at Newmarket won by Tidal Wave. In November, she was scratched for her last engagement, the Rangemore Plate.

=== The 1912 Epsom Oaks ===
On 5 June at Epsom Racecourse Mirska, ridden by Joe Childs started a 33/1 outsider in a fourteen-runner field for the 134th running of the Oaks Stakes. The overwhelming favourite was Tagalie, who had won the 1000 Guineas and defeated male opposition to win the Epsom Derby. Racing on heavy ground Mirska overtook the weakening Tagalie in the straight and drew away to win by three lengths.

== Retirement ==
Mirska was retired from racing immediately after her Oaks victory. She returned to Prat's stud in France and was covered by Rock Sand at the Haras de Villebon in 1913. There is no record of the Rock Sand foal racing or if Mirska was rebred.

== Pedigree ==
Pedigree of Mirska (GB), Bay Filly, 1909
Sire St. Frusquin (GB) Brown, 1893	St. Simon; Brown, 1881	Galopin	Vedette
Sire St. Frusquin (GB) Brown, 1893	St. Simon; Brown, 1881	Galopin	Flying Duchess
Sire St. Frusquin (GB) Brown, 1893	St. Simon; Brown, 1881	St. Angela	King Tom
Sire St. Frusquin (GB) Brown, 1893	St. Simon; Brown, 1881	St. Angela	Adeline
Sire St. Frusquin (GB) Brown, 1893	Isabel (GB); Chestnut, 1879	Plebeian	Joskin
Sire St. Frusquin (GB) Brown, 1893	Isabel (GB); Chestnut, 1879	Plebeian	Queen Elizabeth
Sire St. Frusquin (GB) Brown, 1893	Isabel (GB); Chestnut, 1879	Parma	Parmesan
Sire St. Frusquin (GB) Brown, 1893	Isabel (GB); Chestnut, 1879	Parma	Archeress
Dam Musa (GB) Bay, 1896	Martagon; Bay, 1877	Bend Or	Doncaster
Dam Musa (GB) Bay, 1896	Martagon; Bay, 1877	Bend Or	Rouge Rose
Dam Musa (GB) Bay, 1896	Martagon; Bay, 1877	Tiger Lily	Macaroni
Dam Musa (GB) Bay, 1896	Martagon; Bay, 1877	Tiger Lily	Polly Agnes
Dam Musa (GB) Bay, 1896	Palmflower; Bay, 1874	The Palmer	Beadsman
Dam Musa (GB) Bay, 1896	Palmflower; Bay, 1874	The Palmer	Madame Eglentine
Dam Musa (GB) Bay, 1896	Palmflower; Bay, 1874	Jenny Diver	Buccaneer
Dam Musa (GB) Bay, 1896	Palmflower; Bay, 1874	Jenny Diver	Fairy
