= St. Amant (horse) =

British Thoroughbred racehorse

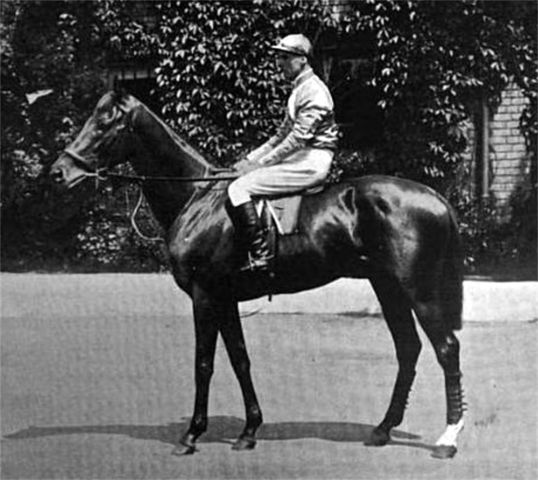
- St. Amant
- Sire: St. Frusquin
- Grandsire: St. Simon
- Dam: Lady Loverule
- Damsire: Muncaster
- Sex: Stallion
- Foaled: 1901
- Country: United Kingdom of Great Britain and Ireland
- Colour: Bay
- Breeder: Leopold de Rothschild
- Owner: Leopold de Rothschild
- Trainer: Alfred Heyhoe; Tom Cannon, Jr
- Record: 21: 6-3-5
- Earnings: £

Major wins
- Coventry Stakes (1903); 2000 Guineas Stakes (1903); Epsom Derby (1904); Jockey Club Stakes (1905)

St. Amant (1901–1920) was a British Thoroughbred racehorse and sire. In a career that lasted from 1903 to 1906, he ran 21 times and won six races. As a three-year-old in 1904, he won both the 2000 Guineas Stakes and the Derby, but he failed to win the English Triple Crown when he was well beaten in the St. Leger by the filly Pretty Polly. He was kept in training for two more seasons but won only one more race before being retired.

== Background ==
St. Amant was bred by his owner, Leopold de Rothschild, at his Southcourt Stud at Leighton Buzzard in Bedfordshire. His sire St. Frusquin was an outstanding racehorse who won the 2000 Guineas Stakes and the Eclipse Stakes in 1896. As a stallion he was leading sire in Great Britain and Ireland on two occasions and sired the Classic winners Rosedrop (1910 Epsom Oaks), Flair (1906 1000 Guineas) and Quintessence (1903 1000 Guineas). St. Amant's dam, Lady Loverule, never appeared in a race but was descended from the 1867 Oaks winner Hippia. St. Amant was trained for most his career by Alfred Hayhoe at Palace House, Newmarket, Suffolk.

== Racing career ==
=== 1903: two-year-old season ===
St. Amant was one of the best two-year-old colts of his generation, but was no match for the filly Pretty Polly, who beat him easily on the two occasions they met. He was successful at Royal Ascot on his debut in June, where he won the Coventry Stakes and followed up in the Prince of Wales's Stakes at Goodwood in July, beating Henry The First by half a length after "a grand race". He was then sent to Doncaster for the Champagne Stakes in which he finished third to Pretty Polly. He won a Rous Memorial Stakes at Newmarket in October, but later that month faced Pretty Polly again at the same course in the Middle Park Plate, regarded as the year's most important two-year-old race. He proved the best of the colts but finished three lengths behind the filly.

At the end of the year, St. Amant had done enough to establish himself as a contender for the following year's Derby, a race in which Pretty Polly had not been entered. The bookmakers offered him at 5/1 for the Epsom and he went into the winter as joint-favourite with Henry The First.

=== 1904: three-year-old season ===
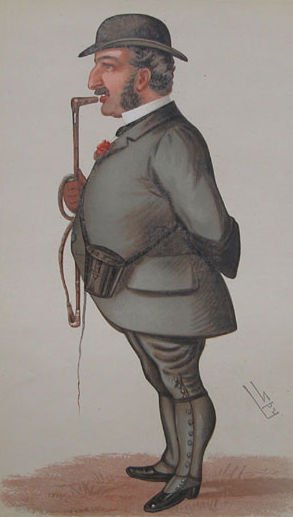
Leopold de Rothschild, by Leslie Ward, 1884.

On his three-year-old debut, St. Amant started odds on favourite for a Biennial Stakes at Newmarket in which he was beaten by His Majesty. He showed an unpleasant side to his character by attempting to bite the winner's rider during the race, and was fitted with blinkers from then on. He was nevertheless made 11/4 favourite for the 2000 Guineas on 27 April. After tracking Henry The First in the early stages, he took the lead two furlongs out, pulled well clear and won easily, beating John O'Gaunt by four lengths. His winning time was more than a second faster than that set by Pretty Polly in the 1000 Guineas at the same meeting. St. Amant's temperament problems resurfaced in the Newmarket Stakes over ten furlongs on 12 May, in which he "declined to exert himself" and finished third behind Henry The First and John O'Gaunt. The performance led some to question the colt's attitude and "courage", with one observer calling him a "thorough rogue", and his odds for the Derby drifted from 9/4 favourite to 5/1.

At Epsom St. Amant was ridden, as at Newmarket, by Kempton Cannon, in an unusually small field of eight runners. The French-trained colt Gouvernant started 7/4 favourite in front of a crowd that included the King and the Prince of Wales. The race was run in a violent thunderstorm, which appeared to adversely affect some of the runners, including Gouvernant and Henry The First, but St. Amant broke quickly, opened up a clear lead, and was never headed. He won "in a canter" by three lengths from John O'Gaunt, with St Denis six lengths further back in third, being greeted by "deafening cheers" from the crowd. The enthusiastic reception was largely due to the popularity of St. Amant's owner, "Leo" Rothschild, who was well known for his charitable work. As part of the celebrations Rothschild distributed coal, groceries and money to the widows of Newmarket, and gave half a crown to every schoolchild in the neighborhood.

On 7 September, St. Amant attempted to become the second successive Triple Crown winner in the St Leger. Pretty Polly was pursuing her own version of the Triple Crown, having won both of the fillies' classics, and the first meeting between the pair since their two-year-old season was highly anticipated. St. Amant was sent to the front after two furlongs in an attempt to repeat the tactics employed at Epsom, but soon after half way he "began to sulk" and dropped back. The filly won the race easily at 2/5 with St. Amant tailed off last of the six runners. He ran in a further six races before the end of the season, at least five of them at Newmarket, but failed to win. He finished a poor seventh of the nine runners behind Rock Sand in the Jockey Club Stakes, third to Lochryan in the Great Foal Stakes, third to Henry The First in the Gatwick Stakes, second to Sansovino in the Surrey Stakes and third to Bachelor's Button in the Champion Stakes. During this period he was described as "a vicious, ill-tempered brute" who had to be fitted with a muzzle during exercise.

At the end of the season St. Amant was sent to be exercised over hurdles at the stables of Tom Cannon Jr at Chattis Hill in Hampshire, in an attempt to "restore his courage".

=== 1905: four-year-old season ===
As a four-year-old, St. Amant remained in the care of Tom Cannon Jr (the brother of Kempton Cannon). He was entered but failed to appear in races such as the Lincolnshire Handicap, Ascot Gold Cup and Princess of Wales's Stakes. During the season, Rothschild received and declined an offer for St. Amant from the Russian government. He finally appeared at Newmarket on 5 October in the Jockey Club Stakes over 14 furlongs. He started a complete outsider for the race, which with £10,000 in prize money was one of the season's most valuable, but returned to his best to win by three quarters of a length from Polymelus. St. Amant's "resurrection" was partly attributed to a cat that had become his constant companion and apparently soothed his temperament. At the end of the year he was returned to Hayhoe.

=== 1906: five-year-old season ===
St. Amant returned as a five-year-old but failed to win in four starts. His best effort in four races came when he finished third to Pretty Polly in the Coronation Cup. He also finished third in the Princess of Wales's Stakes at Newmarket on 5 July.

== Assessment ==
In their book A Century of Champions, John Randall and Tony Morris rated St. Amant as an "inferior" Derby winner.

In 1904, St. Amant won prize money of £11,750, placing him third on the list of highest earners behind Rock Sand and Pretty Polly. In the 1905 list, St. Amant's sole win in the Jockey Club Stakes was enough to put him equal fourth on the list behind Cherry Lass, Val d'Or and Cicero.

== Stud career ==
St. Amant was not a particularly successful stallion. The best of his offspring was the filly Chacolet, who was bred in England but became a champion racehorse in the United States in the early 1920s.

== Pedigree ==
Pedigree of St Amant (GB), bay stallion, 1901
Sire St Frusquin (GB) 1893	St Simon; 1881	Galopin	Vedette
Sire St Frusquin (GB) 1893	St Simon; 1881	Galopin	Flying Duchess
Sire St Frusquin (GB) 1893	St Simon; 1881	St Angela	King Tom*
Sire St Frusquin (GB) 1893	St Simon; 1881	St Angela	Adeline
Sire St Frusquin (GB) 1893	Isabel; 1879	Plebeian	Joskin
Sire St Frusquin (GB) 1893	Isabel; 1879	Plebeian	Queen Elizabeth
Sire St Frusquin (GB) 1893	Isabel; 1879	Parma	Parmesan
Sire St Frusquin (GB) 1893	Isabel; 1879	Parma	Archeress
Dam Lady Loverule (GB) 1888	Muncaster; 1877	Doncaster	Stockwell
Dam Lady Loverule (GB) 1888	Muncaster; 1877	Doncaster	Marigold
Dam Lady Loverule (GB) 1888	Muncaster; 1877	Windermere	Macaroni
Dam Lady Loverule (GB) 1888	Muncaster; 1877	Windermere	Miss Agnes
Dam Lady Loverule (GB) 1888	Nellie; 1879	Hermit	Newminster
Dam Lady Loverule (GB) 1888	Nellie; 1879	Hermit	Seclusion
Dam Lady Loverule (GB) 1888	Nellie; 1879	Hippia	King Tom*
Dam Lady Loverule (GB) 1888	Nellie; 1879	Hippia	Daughter of the Star (Family: 14)

* St Amant is inbred 4S x 4D to the stallion King Tom, meaning that he appears fourth generation on the sire side of his pedigree and fourth on the dam side of his pedigree.
