= Sol Green =

Solomon Green (1 August 1868 – 11 May 1948), invariably referred to as "Sol Green", was a Melbourne bookmaker and racehorse owner and breeder. He styled himself "Leviathan of the Ring" (Note: A sobriquet first applied to William Davies in England and later to Joe Lee and Richard Henry Fry; in Australia to Joe Thompson, but also to Humphrey Oxenham, James T. Hackett, Dick Gilbert, Bob Jansen and William Mulligan.) but was also referred to as "Foots" on account of the size of his "pedal extremities".

== Biography ==
Caricature by David Low

Green was born in the East-End of London to Judah or Yudah Green, a publican who had a long association with English racecourses as betting enclosure "enforcer", a position of trust requiring tact and discretion. Quitting his apprenticeship as upholsterer, he left for Australia at an age variously stated as 15, 16 in 1885; 17 in 1885, or 19 in 1888, with three companions, disembarking at the jetty, Williamstown, Victoria. Having a quick brain but no appetite for manual labour, he soon found employment as a bookmaker's clerk, and by age 22 had enough experience and contacts to make book himself — in those days there was no licence, just a charge levied by the racing club, and a bookmaker succeeded or failed depending on his ability to attract punters and take their silver, hence the term "metallician". He would be some years at "the hill", Flemington and "the flat", Caulfield, before he built up the sort of reputation it took to be invited into the inner enclosure of "the paddock" where thousands of pounds changed hands. But between racedays he was not idle, becoming an habitué of auction houses and other venues, mostly Jewish, where money changes hands and a commission could be earned by a nimble mind.

He got a start in Adelaide, when he teamed up with Jimmy Carr, being accepted as a partner before he returned to Melbourne. He gained entrée to the Paddock in 1890, survived the 1893 banking crisis, and in ten years was at the top of the game, a bitter rival to John Wren. His speciality was doubles, where punter could enjoy the prospect of large winnings without betting on outsiders. One recorded instance was in 1907, when Sir Hugh Denison, through an intermediary, wagered £1000 on the Poseidon-Apologue double on the Caulfield and Melbourne cups. The following morning, Green presented the go-between with a bank cheque for £100,000 (hundreds of millions in today's dollars).

Sometime before 1900 he founded a Melbourne Tattersall's Club, which survived less than ten years before being shut down by authorities for the gambling activities being conducted there, and consequently founded in the same premises the "Beaufort Club", which was preemptively refused a licence on the grounds of Green's involvement.

His innovation was to run an SP book by post from Perth, Western Australia, so anyone anywhere in Australia could wager on the outcome of major races. The operation was a huge success.

=== As owner, breeder and trainer ===
Green purchased the stallion Lord Hopetoun in 1894, sold him to Richardson's Moturo racing stable at Taranaki, near Auckland. Eighteen months later "Lord Hopetoun" died in the fire that engulfed the stables. Another purchase was Predominant in 1895

In 1906 Green purchased "Shipley" stud farm on the banks of the Hopkins River near Warrnambool, Victoria. Positano was the stud's first sire, and produced many successful racehorses, including Melbourne Cup winners Poseidon (1906), Lord Cardigan (1903), Piastre (1912), and Lord Nolan (1908). Mooltan, May King and Jacamar were also successful. On a visit to England in 1906 Green purchased broodmare Tragedy Queen, who was in foal to Persimmon. The foal grew up to be the stallion Comedy King, winner of the 1910 Melbourne Cup.

Green quit bookmaking in 1913 to concentrate on breeding and racing thoroughbreds. Comedy King went on to sire Artilleryman; bred and trained by Green, he won the 1919 Melbourne Cup. He also bred King Ingoda, winner of the 1922 Melbourne Cup. Notable acquisitions were:

- Acamar, who cost 2000 guineas as a yearling in New Zealand; won the St. Clair Trial at Caulfield in 1925.
- Strephon, perhaps Green's favorite horse, was such a consistent winner in Australia that Green took him to England, where he failed to show any form, and was sold for a fraction of his purchase price.

In 1924 Green acquired "Underbank", of 667 acres (270 ha) near Bacchus Marsh for use as a training ground. He purchased Gothic as a potential sire of champions, but his hopes were dashed when the stallion died from an internal abscess. "Underbank" was again in the news when Phar Lap spelled there for a month in 1930.

In 1929 Green was the subject of a stewards' inquiry after the failure of his mare My Lady Gay in the River Handicap at Flemington on 7 March 1929. The charge was dropped, perhaps on the basis of his losing bets of £2,000, but he was not exonerated, and absented himself from Australian racetracks for three years as a form of protest, marking his return by racing Verbatim in the Criterion Handicap on 1 January 1932 (she ended nowhere).

In 1938 he commissioned the journalist Herbert Austin Wolfe ("Cardigan") to purchase broodmares from England for his stud farm.

Green is recorded as publishing a "sporting pocket book".

=== Real estate ===
After the 1893 banking crisis Green began investing in real estate. Among properties he owned at one time or another were:

- Phair's Hotel in 1911
- Empire Hotel in 1911
- Victoria Buildings 1916 with J. M. Gillespie and other investors

Pastoral properties

- Mummel station, a merino stud near Dubbo, in partnership with Graham Ryan Johnson.
- Dynevor Downs station, 90 miles (140 km) west of Cunnamulla, managed by Gus Pegler, in 1914.
- Llanrheidol, 120 miles (190 km) from Winton in partnership with Graham Ryan Johnson.

In 1947 "Underbank", on which Green had spent £30,000 on improvements, was sold by auction to trainer Lou Robertson (Note: Robertson had a long association with "Underbank", where he trained Gothic and Topgallant, horses who died within days of each other.) for £28,000. Green's Parwan Park (or Parwan Vale), farmland of 236 acres (96 ha), also near Bacchus Marsh, was on offer at the same auction but passed in at £18,000. Its valuation as a brown coal deposit was deplored by the RSL, who wanted it subdivided for soldier settlement.

=== Philanthropy ===
Green was a prominent supporter of charitable causes, notably hospitals and victims of war. In 1943 he opened a trust fund of £50,000 to finance low-interest loans to returned servicemen wishing to purchase a home. He organised a yearling sale to purchase blankets for victims of the London blitz. In September 1946 he gave £42,000 to be distributed equally among Melbourne's five main hospitals, and in 1947 another £50,000.

== Family ==
Solomon Green (1 August 1868 – 11 May 1948) married Rebecca Mendes on 3 February 1892. They had three sons. They had a home "Sylvia" at 211 Beaconsfield Parade, St Kilda or Middle Park.
