= Keystone (horse) =

British-bred Thoroughbred racehorse

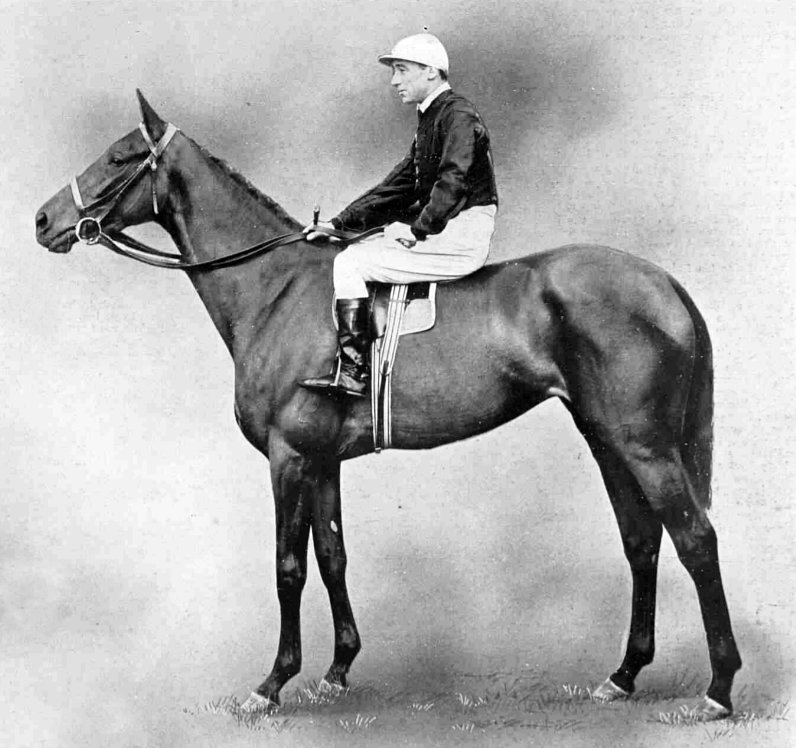
- Keystone in 1906.
- Sire: Persimmon
- Grandsire: St. Simon
- Dam: Lock and Key
- Damsire: Janissary
- Sex: Mare
- Foaled: 1903
- Country: United Kingdom
- Colour: Bay
- Breeder: Frederick Stanley, 16th Earl of Derby
- Owner: Lord Derby
- Trainer: George Lambton
- Record: 9: 5-1-0 (incomplete)
- Earnings: £12,832 (1906)

Major wins
- Oaks Stakes (1906); Coronation Stakes (1906)

Awards
- Biggest money-winner in England (1906)

Keystone (also known as Keystone II, 1903 – 1929) was a British Thoroughbred racehorse and broodmare. Having suffered from ill-health as a juvenile she recorded an emphatic win in the Epsom Oaks on her second racecourse appearance. She went on to win the Coronation Stakes and three other races as well as finishing second in the Jockey Club Stakes and a possibly unlucky fourth in the St Leger. She failed to win in the following year and was retired from racing. As a broodmare she produced the St Leger winner Keysoe and was the female-line ancestor of Display and Ballymoss.

== Background ==
Keystone was a bay mare bred in England by her owner Frederick Stanley, 16th Earl of Derby. The filly was sent intotraining with George Lambton at Bedford Lodge stables in Newmarket, Suffolk.

She was sired by Persimmon, whose wins included the Derby, St Leger, Eclipse Stakes and Ascot Gold Cup and who went on to be British champion sire on four occasions. Her dam Lock and Key was a minor winner and a descendant of the influential British broodmare Splitvote.

== Racing career ==
=== 1905: two-year-old season ===
Keystone was troubled with a respiratory infection in 1905 and made her only appearance in the Champagne Stakes at Doncaster Racecourse in September. She ran with some promise although she finished sixth of the eight runners behind the colt Achilles.

=== 1906: three-year-old season ===
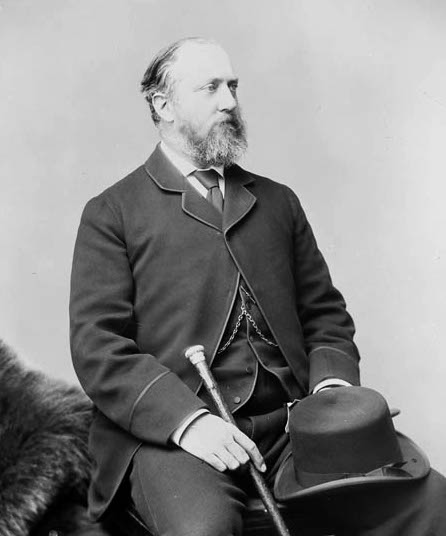
16th Earl of Derby, Keystone's owner and breeder

On her first run as a three-year-old Keystone was partnered by the American jockey Danny Maher in the 128th running of the Oaks Stakes over one and a half miles at Epsom Racecourse on 1 of June. Despite her lack of experience she was made the 5/2 favourite ahead of the Duke of Portland's Quair (3/1) and William Bass's Gold Riach (5/1). The race began in "very threatening" weather conditions and finished in a hailstorm. Keystone took the lead two furlongs out and never looked in any danger of defeat, winning the race "in very easy style" by three lengths from Gold Riach with a gap of six lengths back to Snow Glory in third.

Later in June the filly was dropped back in distance for the Coronation Stakes over one mile at Royal Ascot. With Maher again in the saddle she won at odds of 8/13.

On 12 September at Doncaster Keystone was matched against male opposition in the St Leger and started the 5/4 favourite. In a very close race she joined the leaders in the straight but after being hampered in a very rough race she faded in the final strides and finished fourth behind the colts Troutbeck, Prince William and Beppo, beaten less than a length by the winner. Two weeks after the Leger she finished second to Beppo in the £10,000 Jockey Club Stakes over fourteen furlongs at Newmarket. In October she returned to form to take the £5,000 Sandown Park Great Foal Stakes, starting at odds of 1/4 and winning easily from Wombwell and Prince William. She won at least two other races that year including a minor race at Liverpool at the end of the year.

=== 1907: four-year-old season ===
Keystone remained in training as a four-year-old but failed to recapture her best form and did not win a race.

== Assessment and honours ==
In their book, A Century of Champions, based on the Timeform rating system, John Randall and Tony Morris rated Keystone an "average" winner of the Oaks.

Keystone was the biggest winner of first-place prize money in England in 1906, with her five wins yielding £12,832.

== Breeding record ==
After her retirement from racing Keystone became a broodmare for Lord Derby's stud. On her owner's death in 1908 she passed into the ownership of his son the 17th Earl. Keystone was euthanised in 1929 after not being bred since 1925. She produced at least eight foals between 1911 and 1924:

- Lock Up, a chestnut filly, foaled in 1911, sired by Bridge of Canny
- Keynote, filly, 1912, by Radium.
- Hemlock, bay filly, 1913, by Spearmint. Granddam of Display
- Trestle, brown filly, 1915, by Swynford. Granddam of The Nile (Poule d'Essai des Pouliches)
- Keysoe, brown filly, 1916, by Swynford. Won the St Leger. Female-line ancestor of Ballymoss
- Archaic, chestnut colt, 1917, by Polymelus. Runner-up in the Derby
- Phalange, bay filly, 1921, by Phalaris
- Bythorne, brown filly, 1924, by Swynford

== Pedigree ==
Pedigree of Keystone (GB), bay mare, 1903
| Sire Persimmon (GB) 1893 | St. Simon; 1881 | Galopin | Vedette |
| Sire Persimmon (GB) 1893 | St. Simon; 1881 | Galopin | Flying Duchess |
| Sire Persimmon (GB) 1893 | St. Simon; 1881 | St. Angela | King Tom |
| Sire Persimmon (GB) 1893 | St. Simon; 1881 | St. Angela | Adeline |
| Sire Persimmon (GB) 1893 | Perdita II; 1881 | Hampton | Lord Clifden |
| Sire Persimmon (GB) 1893 | Perdita II; 1881 | Hampton | Lady Langden |
| Sire Persimmon (GB) 1893 | Perdita II; 1881 | Hermione | Young Melbourne |
| Sire Persimmon (GB) 1893 | Perdita II; 1881 | Hermione | La Belle Helene |
| Dam Lock and Key (GB) 1893 | Janissary; 1887 | Isonomy | Sterling |
| Dam Lock and Key (GB) 1893 | Janissary; 1887 | Isonomy | Isola Bella |
| Dam Lock and Key (GB) 1893 | Janissary; 1887 | Jannette | Lord Clifden |
| Dam Lock and Key (GB) 1893 | Janissary; 1887 | Jannette | Chevisaunce |
| Dam Lock and Key (GB) 1893 | Seclusion; 1886 | Hermit | Newminster |
| Dam Lock and Key (GB) 1893 | Seclusion; 1886 | Hermit | Seclusion |
| Dam Lock and Key (GB) 1893 | Seclusion; 1886 | Boundary | Stockwell |
| Dam Lock and Key (GB) 1893 | Seclusion; 1886 | Boundary | Bribery (Family: 2-u) |

- Keystone was inbred 4 × 4 to Lord Clifden, meaning that this stallion appears twice in the fourth generation of her pedigree.
