= Gothic (horse) =

Australian thoroughbred

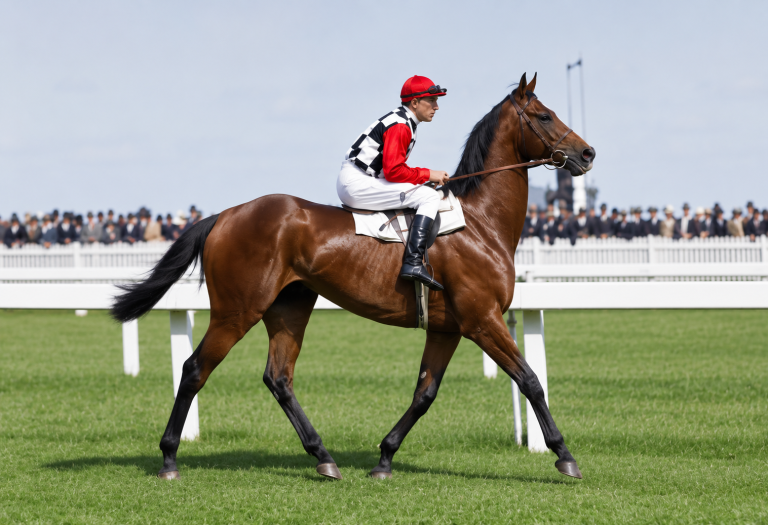
- Gothic and Hughie Cairns; Caulfield Racecourse
- Sire: Tracery (USA)
- Grandsire: Rock Sand (GB)
- Dam: Sundrilla (FR)
- Damsire: Sundridge (GB)
- Sex: Stallion
- Foaled: 1923
- Died: 2 October 1930; Bacchus Marsh, Victoria
- Country: England
- Colour: Black
- Breeder: S. J. Unzue
- Owner: Sol Green
- Trainer: Lou Robertson
- Record: 30: 13½, 5, 8
- Earnings: £22,870

Major wins
- Newmarket Handicap (1927, 1928); Futurity Stakes (1928); C.M .Lloyd Stakes (1928, 1929); Memsie Stakes (1928); Caulfield Stakes (1928); Melbourne Stakes (1928); Linlithgow Stakes (1928); C.B. Fisher Plate (1928); William Reid Stakes (1929); C.F. Orr Stakes (1929)

Honours
- Gothic Stakes Caulfield Racecourse

Gothic (1923 – 2 October 1930) was a black Australian thoroughbred stallion who raced for 4 seasons from a three-year-old to a six-year-old, recording major wins from 6 furlongs to 1½ miles and champion Sydney jockey Jim Pike the Australian Racing Hall of Fame inductee 2002 winning 9 races.

== Breeding ==
Gothic was bred by Saturnino Unzue in Argentina and foaled in England. Sire Tracery (USA) winner of the 1912 St Leger Stakes & St James's Palace Stakes, 1913 Champion Stakes & Eclipse Stakes and Damsire Sundridge (GB) was Leading Sire of Great Britain in 1911. Gothic was purchased for 1,500 guineas at the Newmarket sales by Andrew Robertson brother of Gothic's trainer for owner Sol Green. Dam Sundrilla (FR) was exported from Argentina in foal to the Newmarket sales England 1921 then bought privately by breeder Major James E. Pratt. Notable offspring were Kingcardine (GB) 1927 St James's Palace Stakes, Jersey Stakes and Doctor Dolittle (GB) 1931 Ribblesdale Stakes.

== Racing career ==
Gothic was an exceptional galloper and raced between 1926 and 1929 and the winner of 8 Group 1 races in the modern era defeated the champion Amounis on four occasions and won 1927 and 1928 VRC Newmarket Handicap, 1928 VATC Futurity Stakes a course record carrying 63.5 kg, 1928 VATC Memsie Stakes carrying 62 kg and third 1928 VATC Caulfield Cup behind Maple carrying 60.5 kg.

Gothic's racing colours were black and white squares, red sleeves and cap.

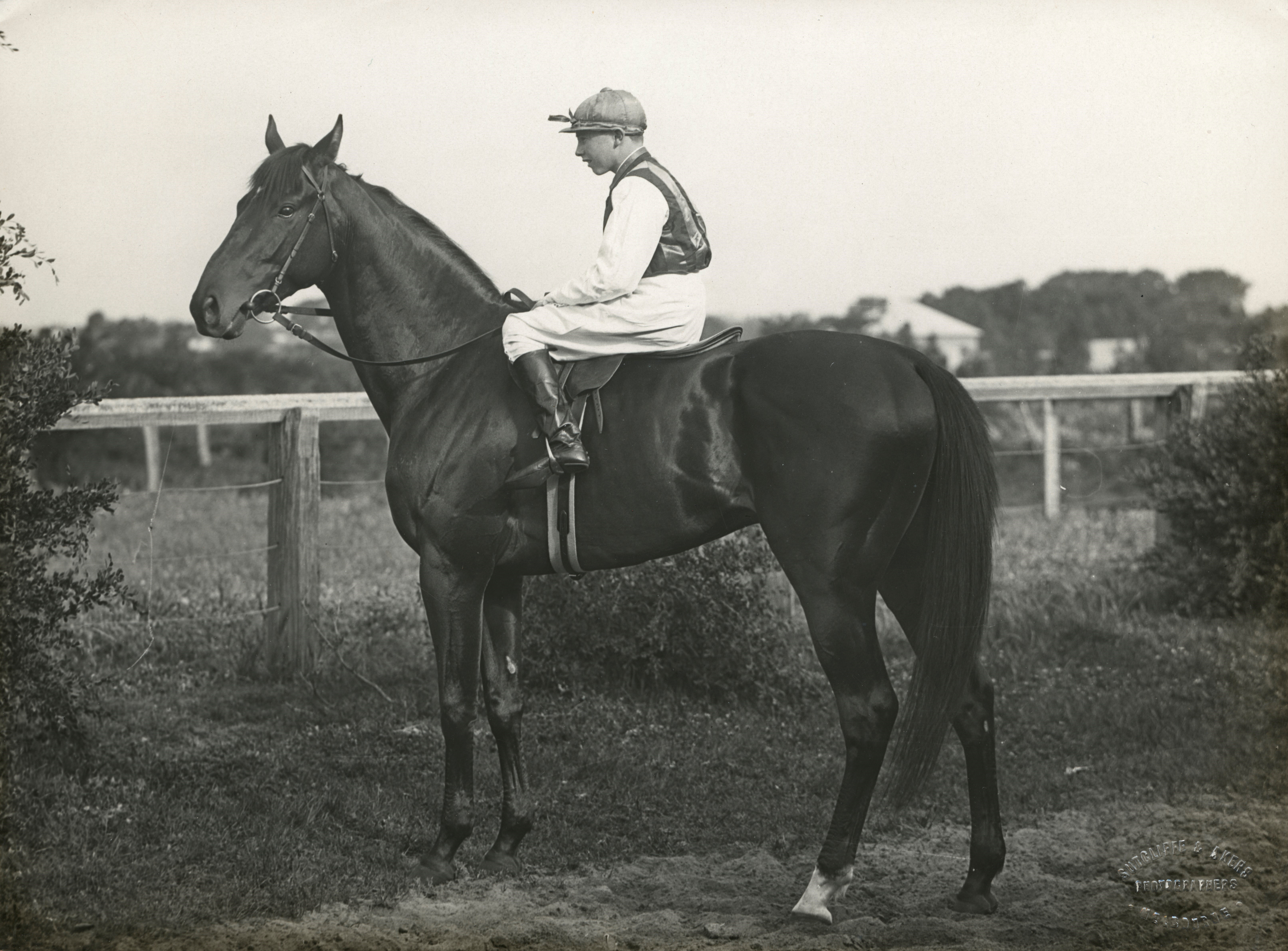
Lavendo, 1915 Caulfield Cup

.

Lou Robertson, originally from New Zealand, was a masterful and patient trainer who first trained trotters and then transitioned to thoroughbreds to win the greatest races on the Australian turf. His stables were located at Mordialloc Victoria. As the leading trainer in the 1928–1929 season and a dominant force in Melbourne racing, he won the Trainer's premiership in 1943–1944 and again in 1945–1946. Major winners included Marabou 1935 VRC Melbourne Cup, Lavendo 1915 VATC Caulfield Cup, Lincoln 1949 VATC Caulfield Cup, Garrio 1935 MVRC W. S. Cox Plate, Leonard 1946 MVRC W. S. Cox Plate and VRC Derby winners 1928 Strephon, 1935 Feldspar and 1944 San Martin. Other stable notables were Iron Duke, Lawrence and Cimbrian.

Owner Sol Green 1868–1948 was a leviathan bookmaker, owner-breeder and philanthropist born in London and imported and bred racehorses at his Shipley stud at Warrnambool, Victoria. Major notables imported and owned by Sol Green were Comedy King 1910 VRC Melbourne Cup & VATC Futurity Stakes and Leading sire in Australia in 1919–20 and the champion 3 year-old front running stayer Strephon 1928 VRC Derby, 1929 AJC St Leger & VRC St Leger and second in 1928 VRC Melbourne Cup to Statesman. Gothic had only done duty at Green's Underbank stud near Bacchus Marsh for one year when he died in October 1930 from an internal abscess.

== Image gallery ==
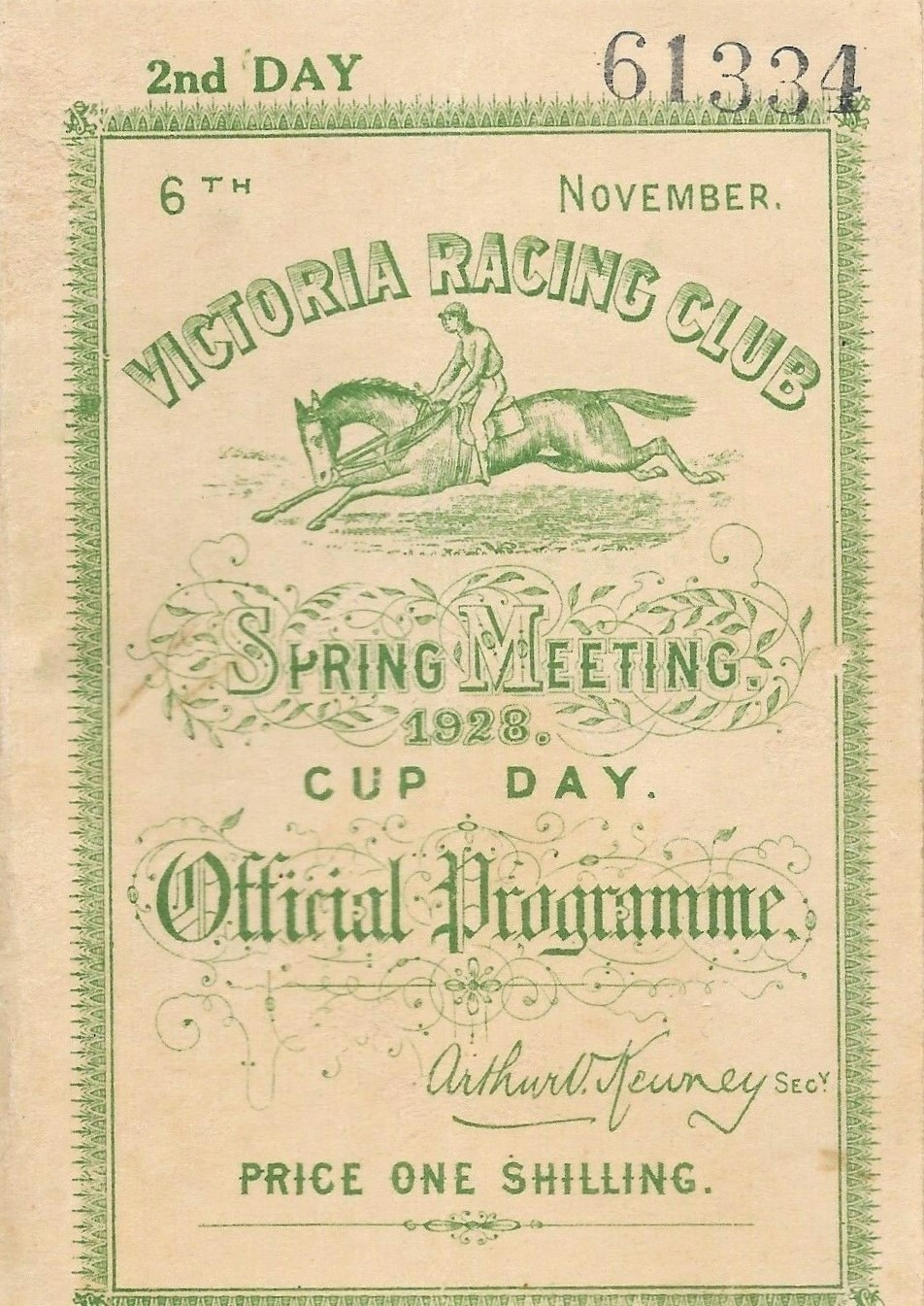
1928 VRC Melbourne Cup racebook front cover

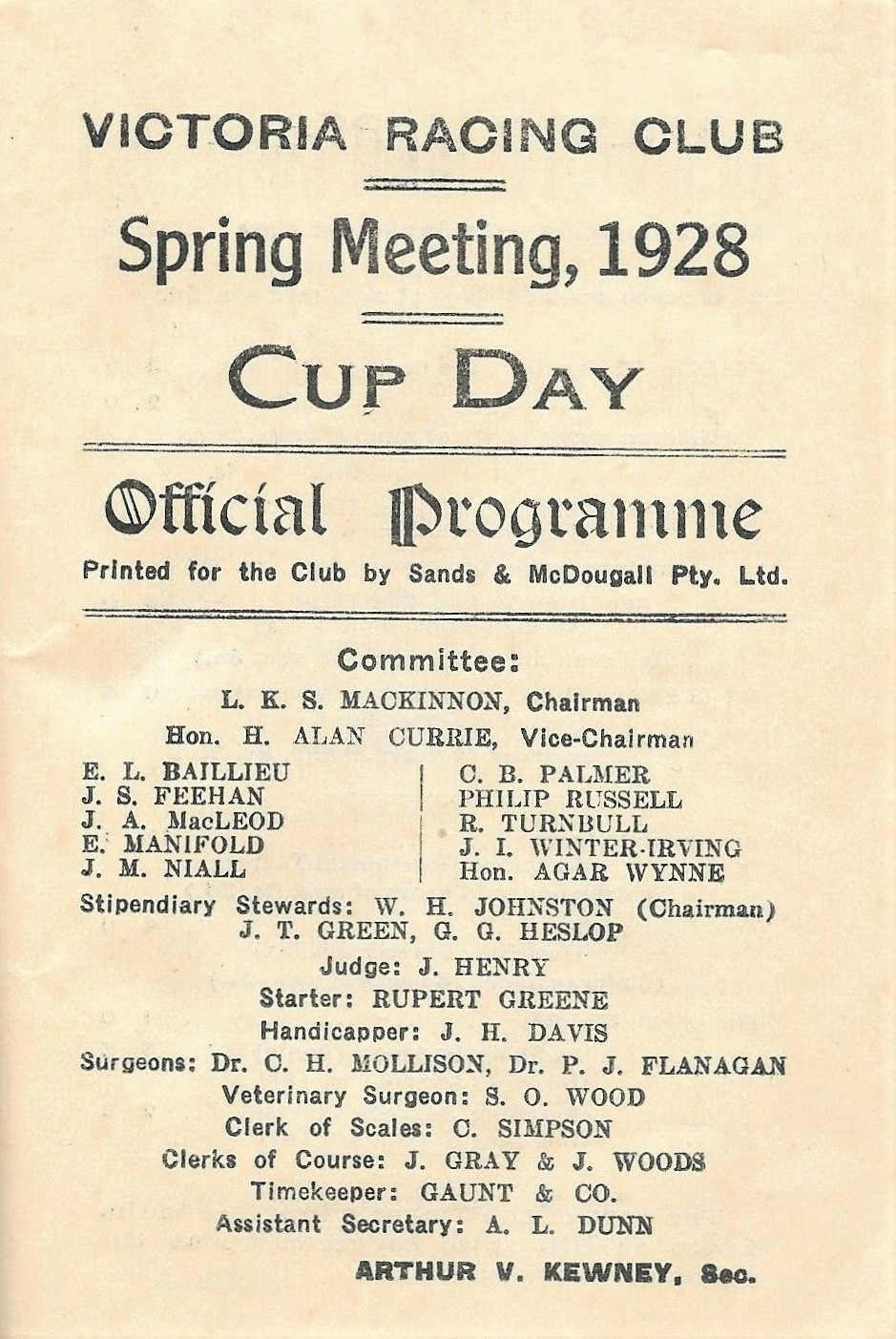
1928 VRC Melbourne Cup showing race day officials

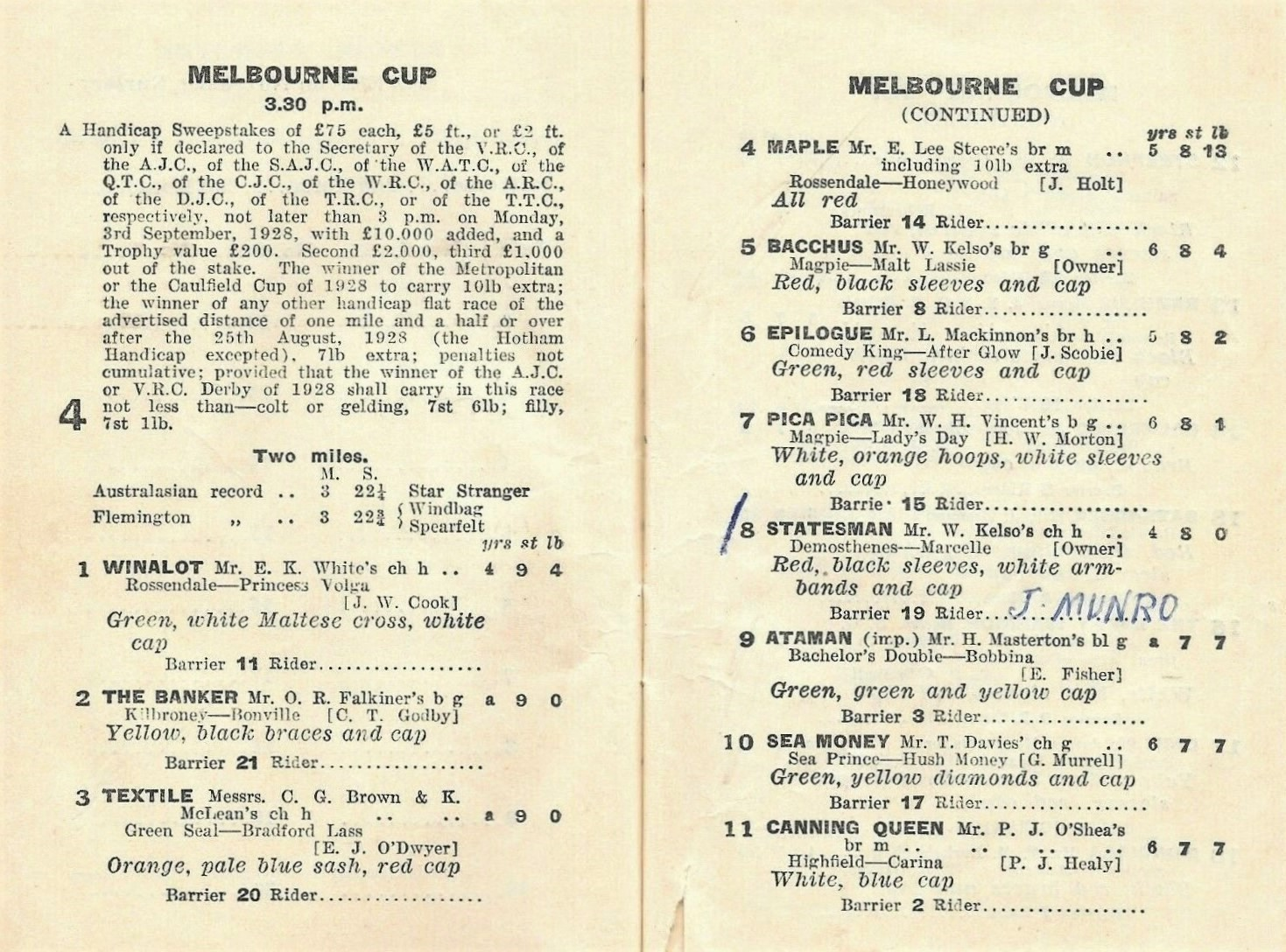
1928 VRC Melbourne Cup racebook showing the winner, Statesman

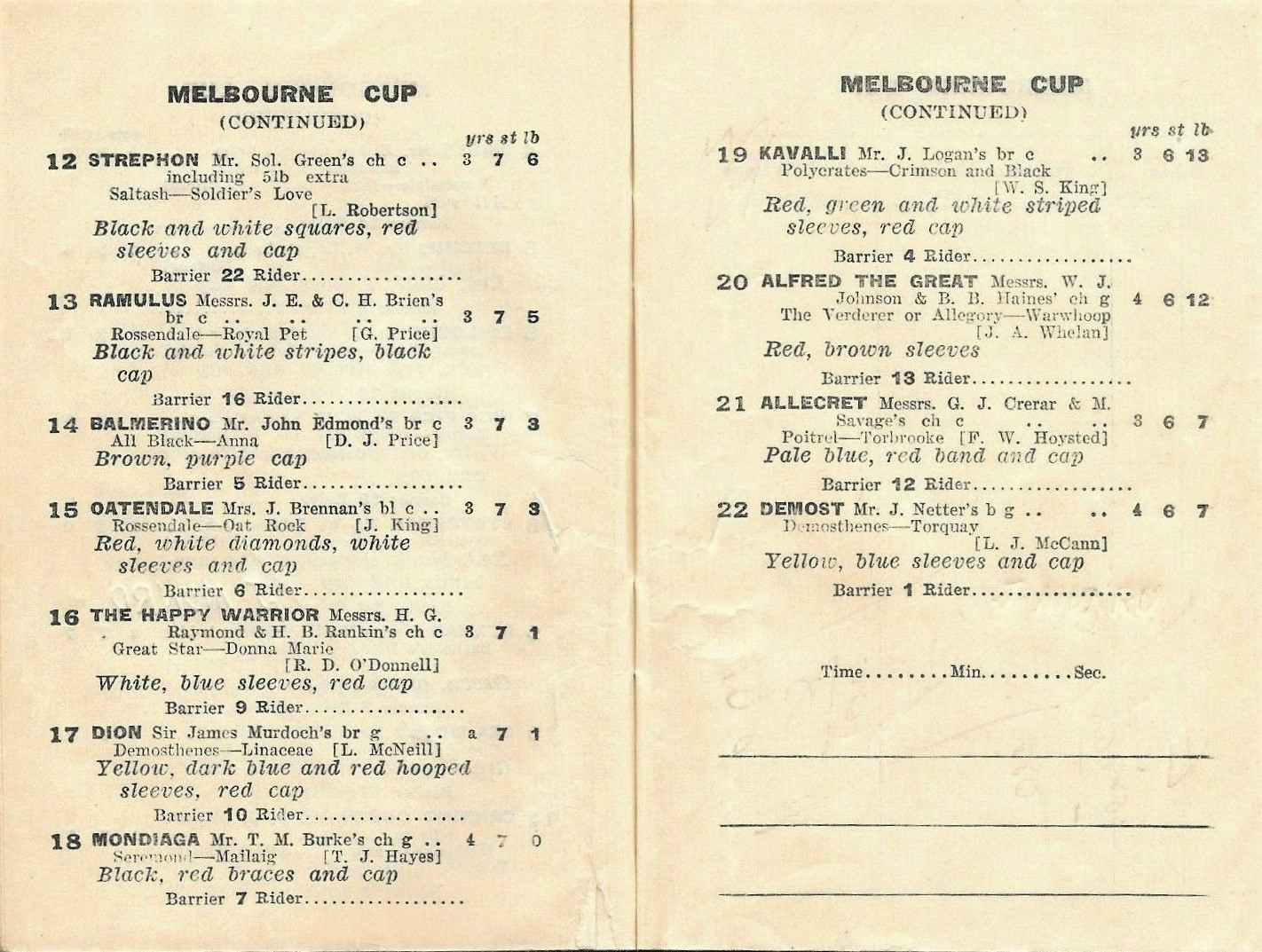
1928 VRC Melbourne Cup showing the Sol Green owned Strephon, placed 2nd

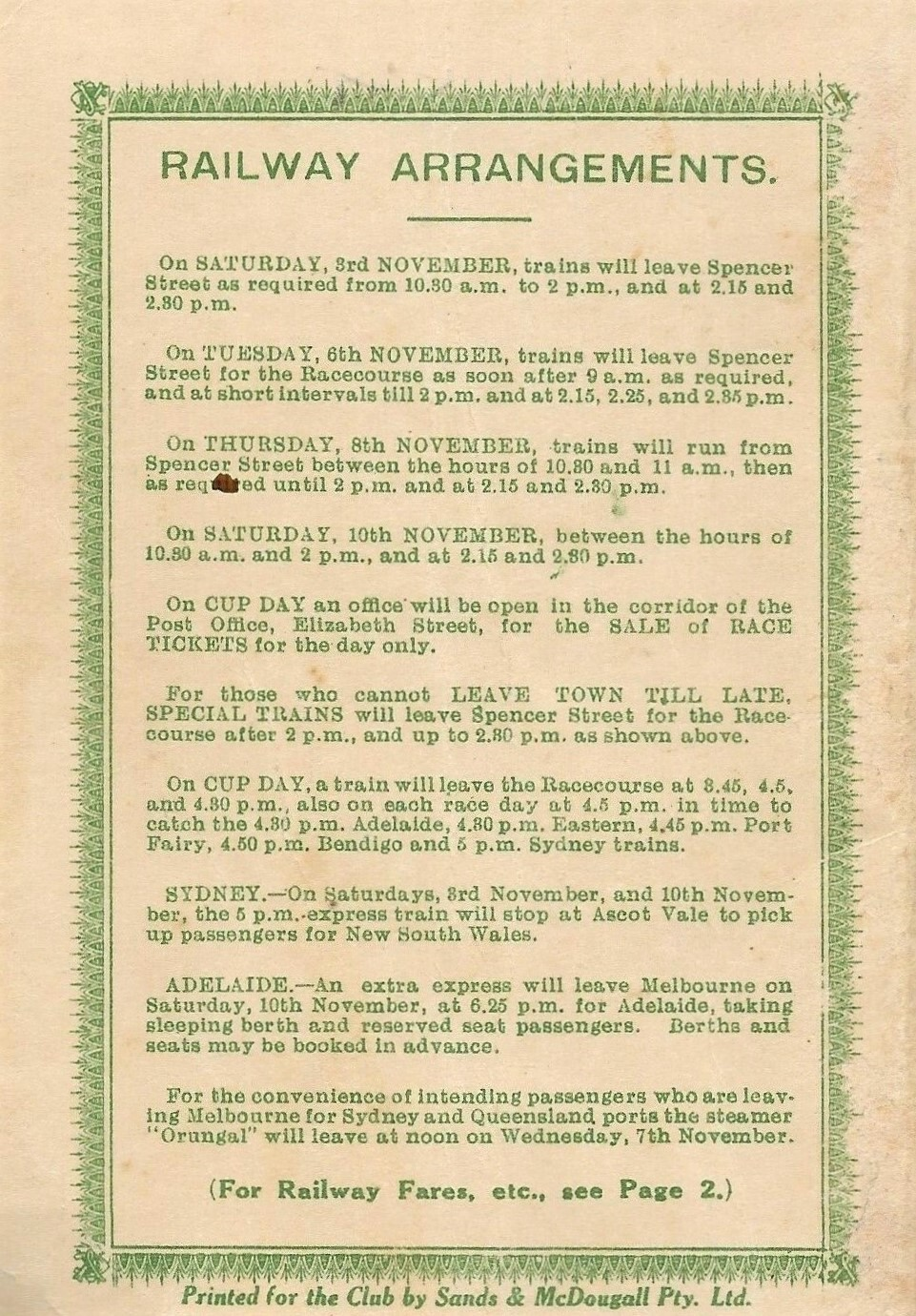
Back cover showing railway arrangements

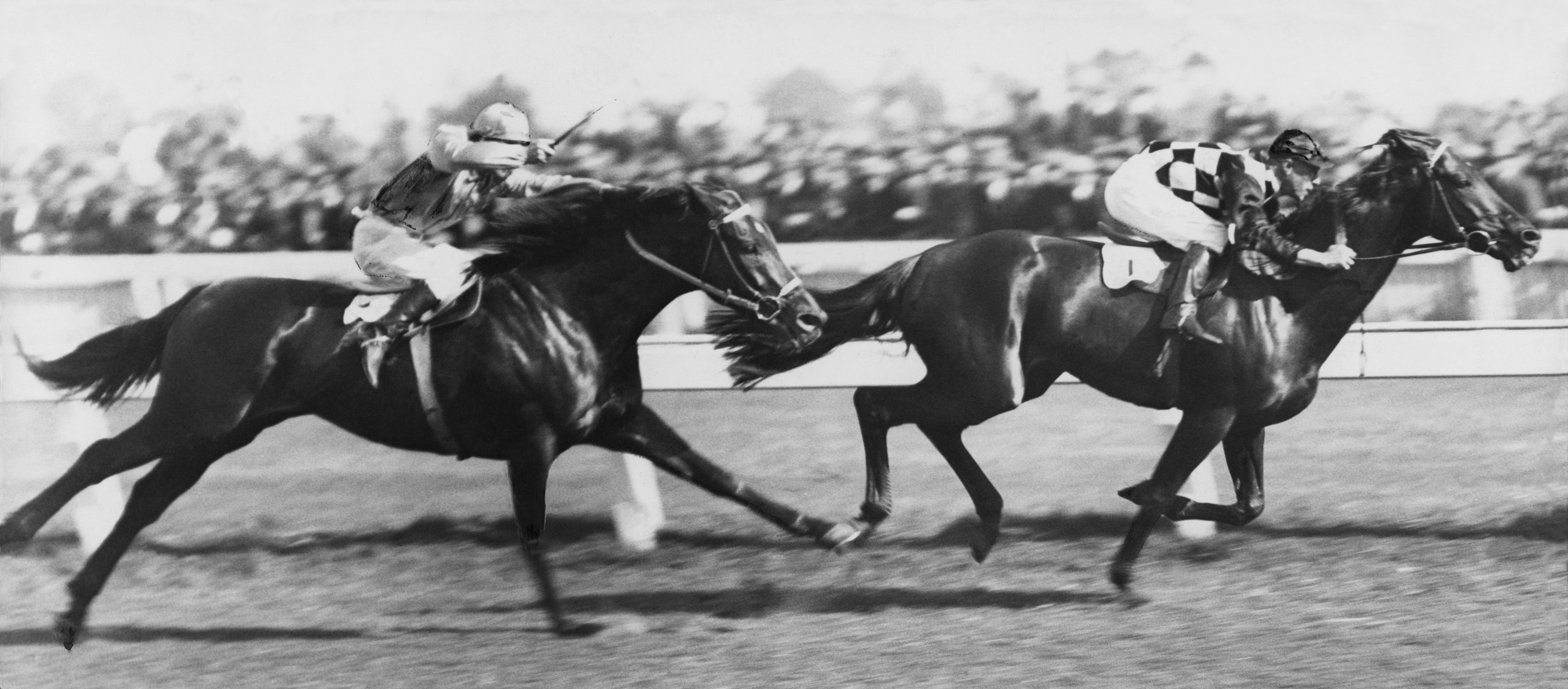
Gothic Jim Pike and Amounis Jim Munro

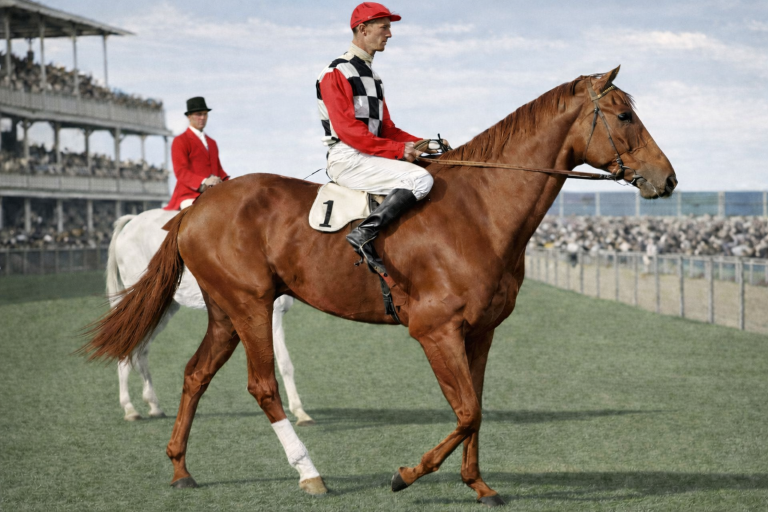
Strephon at Randwick Racecourse
