= Keysoe (horse) =

British-bred Thoroughbred racehorse

- Sire: Swynford
- Grandsire: John O'Gaunt
- Dam: Keystone
- Damsire: Persimmon
- Sex: Mare
- Foaled: 1916
- Country: United Kingdom
- Colour: Brown
- Breeder: 17th Earl of Derby
- Owner: Lord Derby
- Trainer: George Lambton
- Record: 12: 4-4-2

Major wins
- Nassau Stakes (1919); St Leger (1919); Newmarket Oaks (1919)

Keysoe (1916–1929) was a British Thoroughbred racehorse and broodmare. Bred and owned by the 17th Earl of Derby she was the product of a mating between two St Leger winners and won the race herself in 1919. She was unraced as a juvenile but developed into a top-class stayer at three, winning the Gratwicke Stakes and the Nassau Stakes at Goodwood Racecourse before taking the St Leger and later winning the Newmarket Oaks. She failed to win as a four-year-old in 1920 although she was placed in all of her races. After her retirement from racing, she had considerable success as a broodmare despite producing very few foals.

== Background ==
Keysoe was a brown mare reportedly standing 17 hands high bred in England by her owner Edward Stanley, 17th Earl of Derby. During her racing career she was trained by George Lambton at the Stanley House stable near Newmarket, Suffolk.

Her sire Swynford was an outstanding racehorse who won the St Leger in 1910 and the Eclipse Stakes in the following year. He was even better as a breeding stallion with his other offspring including Blandford, Saucy Sue, Challenger, Tranquil and Sansovino. Keysoe's dam Keystone II was an exceptional racemare who won the Epsom Oaks in 1906.

== Racing career ==
=== 1919: three-year-old season ===
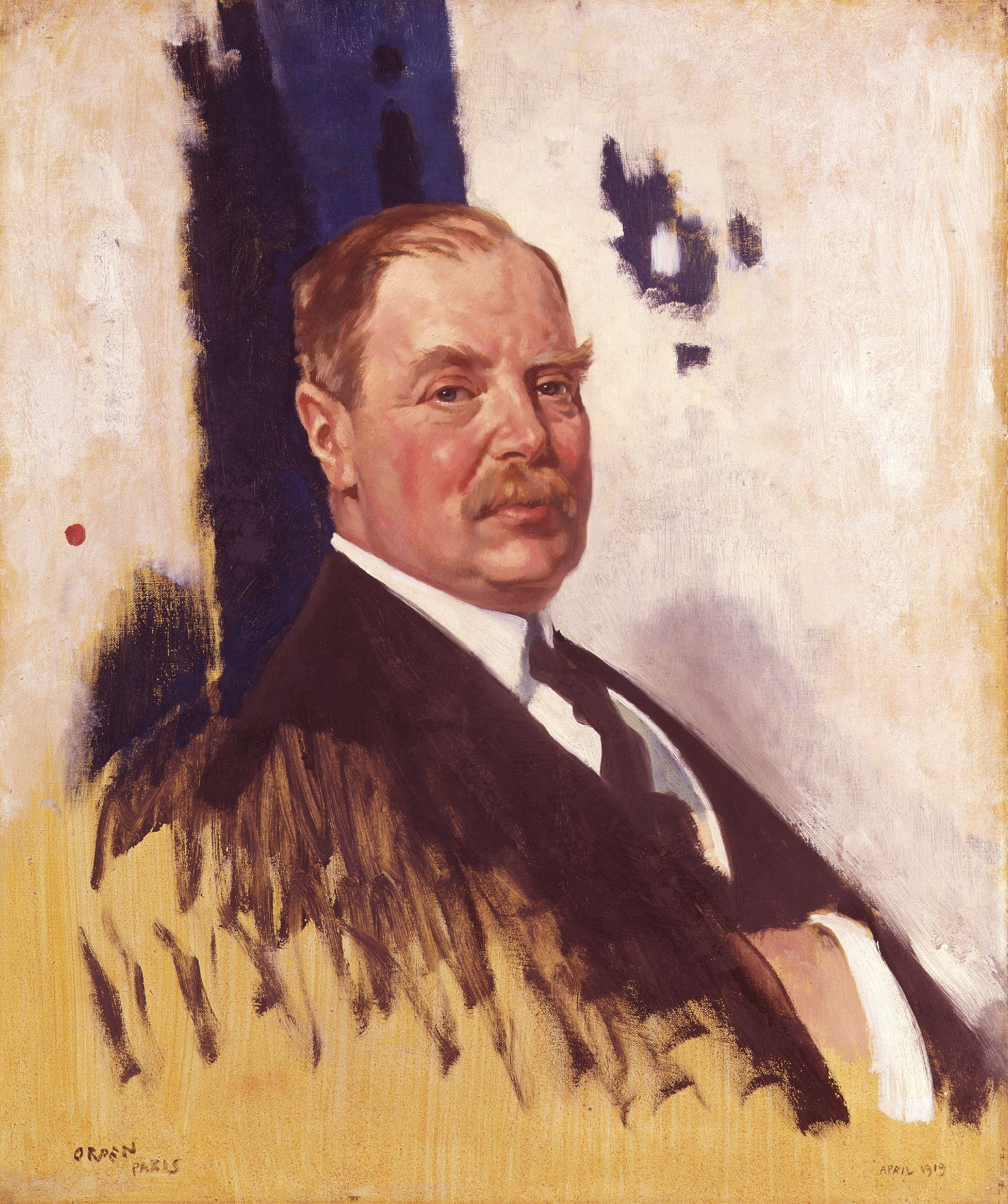
Keysoe's owner Lord Derby

Keysoe was unraced as a two-year-old and began her racing career in the spring of 1919. In May 1919, she ran in the 1000 Guineas over the Rowley Mile at Newmarket but finished unplaced behind Roseway. Her performance came as a disappointment to her connections who had regarded her as superior to her stablemate Glaciale, who finished third. In June she finished unplaced behind Flying Spear in the Coronation Stakes at Royal Ascot. At Goodwood Racecourse on 29 July she recorded her first success as she won the Gratwicke Stakes "in a canter" by eight lengths from Britannia and Misty Morning. At the same track in August she followed up by winning the ten furlong Nassau Stakes winning at odds of 13/8. She then contracted a respiratory infection and started "coughing" which disrupted her training.

On 10 September Keysoe was moved up in class to contest 144th running of the St Leger Stakes over 14 1/2 furlongs in at Doncaster Racecourse. Wartime restrictions meant that the race had been run at Newmarket since 1914 and the return of the race to its traditional venue attracted an enormous crowd with spectators packed hundreds deep along the half-mile straight. The crowd included the 85-year-old ex-jockey John Osborne who won the race on Lord Clifden and Apology and was attending his 66th St Leger. Ridden by the Australian jockey Bernard "Brownie" Carslake Keysoe started at odds of 100/8 (12.5/1) against nine opponents including Buchan who had finished runner-up in both the 2000 Guineas and the Epsom Derby and started 8/11 favourite ahead of the Prince of Wales's Stakes winner Dominion and the Irish challenger Cheap Popularity. In a slowly-run race, Keysoe led for most of the way and then "shot ahead" in the straight to win "very easily indeed" by six lengths from Dominion with Buchan two lengths back in third.

Three weeks after her Leger Triumph Keysoe started 4/6 favourite for the Kingsclere Stakes at Newbury Racecourse but was defeated at level weights by the Park Hill Stakes winner Flying Spear. Later that month she returned to winning form, taking the Newmarket Oaks over fourteen furlongs when conceding fourteen pounds to the runner-up Palatina. On her final appearance of the season she was beaten by Pomme de Terre in the Liverpool St Leger on 5 November.

=== 1920: four-year-old season ===
Keysoe remained in training as a four-year-old in 1920. In May she finished second to Kentish Cob in the Burwell Stakes at Newmarket and was then beaten by the colt Our Stephen (her only opponent) in the Great Northern Handicap at York. In the Ascot Gold Cup in June she came home fourth behind Buchan, Tangiers and Juveigneur, but was promoted to third after Buchan was disqualified for crossing the runner-up. In August Keysoe finished third behind Iron hand and Manilardo in the Ebor Handicap at York.

== Assessment and honours ==
In their book, A Century of Champions, based on the Timeform rating system, John Randall and Tony Morris rated Keysoe as an "inferior" winner of the St Leger.

== Breeding record ==
At the end of her racing career Keysoe was retired to become a broodmare for Lord Derby's stud. She produced few foals but at least two top-class performers. Keysoe was euthanized in 1929 after producing twins to Papyrus. Her progeny included:

- Caissot, a chestnut colt, foaled in 1923, sired by Gay Crusader. Won Prince of Wales's Stakes and second in the St Leger.
- Flittermere, chestnut filly, 1926, by Buchan. Won Yorkshire Oaks. Grand-dam of Ballymoss
- Papworth, black colt, 1929, by Papyrus

== Pedigree ==
Pedigree of Keysoe (GB), brown mare, 1916
Sire Swynford (GB) 1907	John O'Gaunt (GB); 1901	Isinglass	Isonomy
Sire Swynford (GB) 1907	John O'Gaunt (GB); 1901	Isinglass	Dead Lock
Sire Swynford (GB) 1907	John O'Gaunt (GB); 1901	La Fleche	St Simon
Sire Swynford (GB) 1907	John O'Gaunt (GB); 1901	La Fleche	Quiver
Sire Swynford (GB) 1907	Canterbury Pilgrim (GB); 1893	Tristan	Hermit
Sire Swynford (GB) 1907	Canterbury Pilgrim (GB); 1893	Tristan	Thrift
Sire Swynford (GB) 1907	Canterbury Pilgrim (GB); 1893	Pilgrimage	The Palmer
Sire Swynford (GB) 1907	Canterbury Pilgrim (GB); 1893	Pilgrimage	Lady Audley
Dam Keystone (GB) 1903	Persimmon (GB); 1893	St. Simon	Galopin
Dam Keystone (GB) 1903	Persimmon (GB); 1893	St. Simon	St Angela
Dam Keystone (GB) 1903	Persimmon (GB); 1893	Perdita	Hampton
Dam Keystone (GB) 1903	Persimmon (GB); 1893	Perdita	Hermione
Dam Keystone (GB) 1903	Lock and Key (GB); 1893	Janissary	Isonomy
Dam Keystone (GB) 1903	Lock and Key (GB); 1893	Janissary	Jannette
Dam Keystone (GB) 1903	Lock and Key (GB); 1893	Seclusion	Hermit
Dam Keystone (GB) 1903	Lock and Key (GB); 1893	Seclusion	Boundary (Family 2-u)

- Keysoe was inbred 3 × 4 to St Simon, meaning that this stallion appears in both the third and fourth generations of her pedigree. She was also inbred 4 × 4 to both Isonomy and Hermit.
