= Artilleryman (horse) =

Australian-bred Thoroughbred racehorse

- Sire: Comedy King (GB)
- Grandsire: Persimmon (GB)
- Dam: Cross Battery (NZ)
- Damsire: Stepniak (NZ)
- Sex: Stallion
- Foaled: 1 August 1916
- Died: 29 January 1921 (aged 4)
- Country: Australia
- Colour: Brown
- Owner: S. Hordern, A D Murphy
- Trainer: P T Heywood
- Record: 26:11-4-3

Major wins
- Memsie Stakes (1919); AJC Derby (1919); Caulfield Guineas (1919); Melbourne Cup (1919); C.B. Fisher Plate (1919); St George Stakes (1920); VRC St Leger (1920); Rawson Stakes (1920)

Artilleryman was an Australian bred Thoroughbred racehorse that won the 1919 Melbourne Cup.

== Background ==
Artilleryman's sire was the 1910 Melbourne Cup winner, Comedy King, the first British bred horse to win the race.

== Racing career ==
In winning the 1919 Melbourne Cup, Artilleryman set a new race record time of 3 minutes 24.5 seconds. Being ridden by Bobbie Lewis. he secured the victory by at least six lengths ahead of the next horse, Richmond Main. This was also the first year that the current three-handled Loving Cup trophy was presented to the winning owner.

Artilleryman died in 1921 after suffering an internal haemorrhage whilst spelling in Bacchus Marsh, Victoria.

== Pedigree ==
Pedigree of Artilleryman (AUS) 1916
Sire Comedy King (GB) 1907	Persimmon (GB); 1893	St. Simon	Galopin
Sire Comedy King (GB) 1907	Persimmon (GB); 1893	St. Simon	St. Angela
Sire Comedy King (GB) 1907	Persimmon (GB); 1893	Perdita	Hampton
Sire Comedy King (GB) 1907	Persimmon (GB); 1893	Perdita	Hermione
Sire Comedy King (GB) 1907	Tragedy Queen (IRE); 1900	Gallinule	Isonomy
Sire Comedy King (GB) 1907	Tragedy Queen (IRE); 1900	Gallinule	Moorhen
Sire Comedy King (GB) 1907	Tragedy Queen (IRE); 1900	Clarion	Ben Battle
Sire Comedy King (GB) 1907	Tragedy Queen (IRE); 1900	Clarion	Black Witch
Dam Cross Battery (NZ) 1902	Stepniak (NZ); 1889	Nordenfeldt	Musket
Dam Cross Battery (NZ) 1902	Stepniak (NZ); 1889	Nordenfeldt	Onyx
Dam Cross Battery (NZ) 1902	Stepniak (NZ); 1889	Steppe	Saunterer
Dam Cross Battery (NZ) 1902	Stepniak (NZ); 1889	Steppe	Seclusion
Dam Cross Battery (NZ) 1902	Firecross (AUS); 1893	Patrol	Grand Flaneur
Dam Cross Battery (NZ) 1902	Firecross (AUS); 1893	Patrol	Terara
Dam Cross Battery (NZ) 1902	Firecross (AUS); 1893	Crossfire	Goldsbrough
Dam Cross Battery (NZ) 1902	Firecross (AUS); 1893	Crossfire	Powder
