= Newmarket Handicap =

Horse race in Melbourne, Victoria, Australia

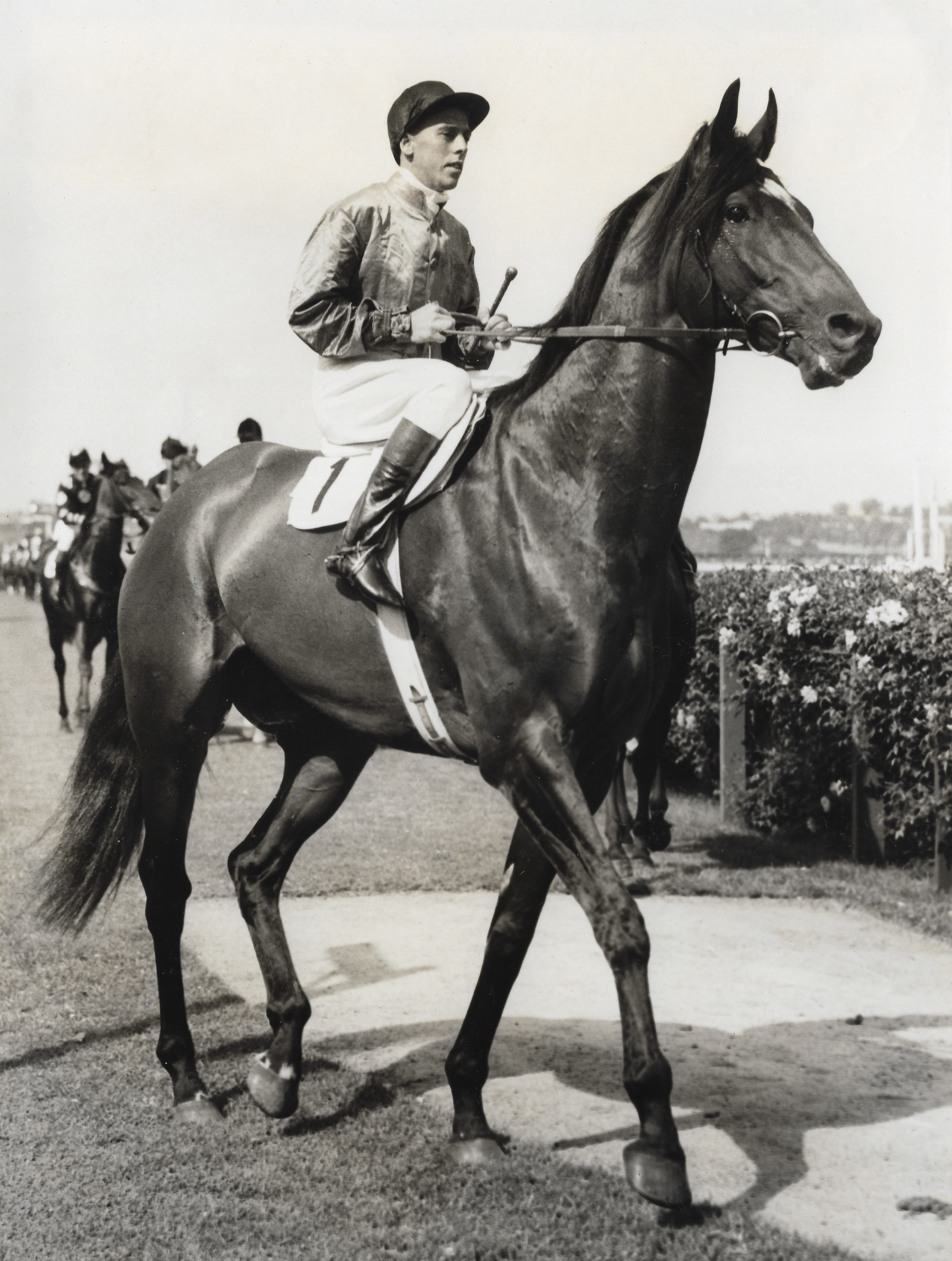
- Bernborough, 1946 winner
- Class: Group 1
- Location: Flemington Racecourse
- Inaugurated: 1874
- Race type: Thoroughbred
- Sponsor: Yulong Stud (2022-26)

Race information
- Distance: 1,200 metres
- Surface: Turf
- Track: Straight
- Qualification: Maidens ineligible
- Weight: Handicap
- Purse: $2,000,000 (2026)

The Newmarket Handicap is a Victoria Racing Club Group 1 Thoroughbred open handicap horse race over a distance of 1200 metres, at Flemington Racecourse, Melbourne, Australia on Super Saturday in March during the VRC Autumn Racing Carnival.

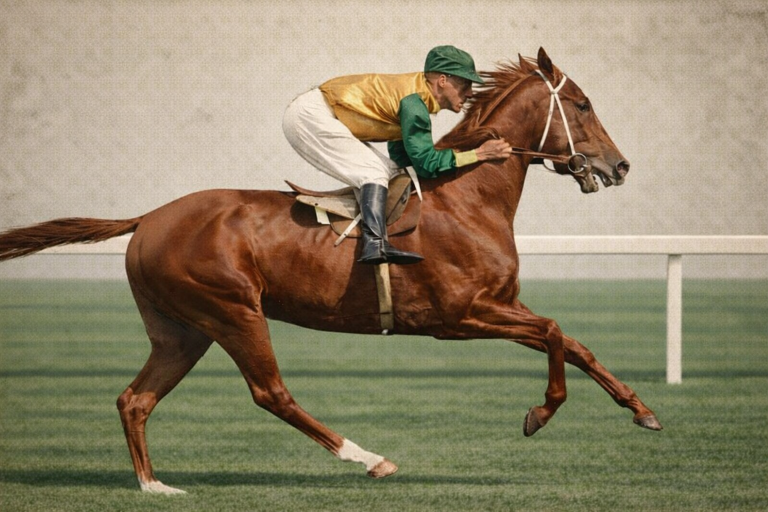
Heroic, 1926 winner

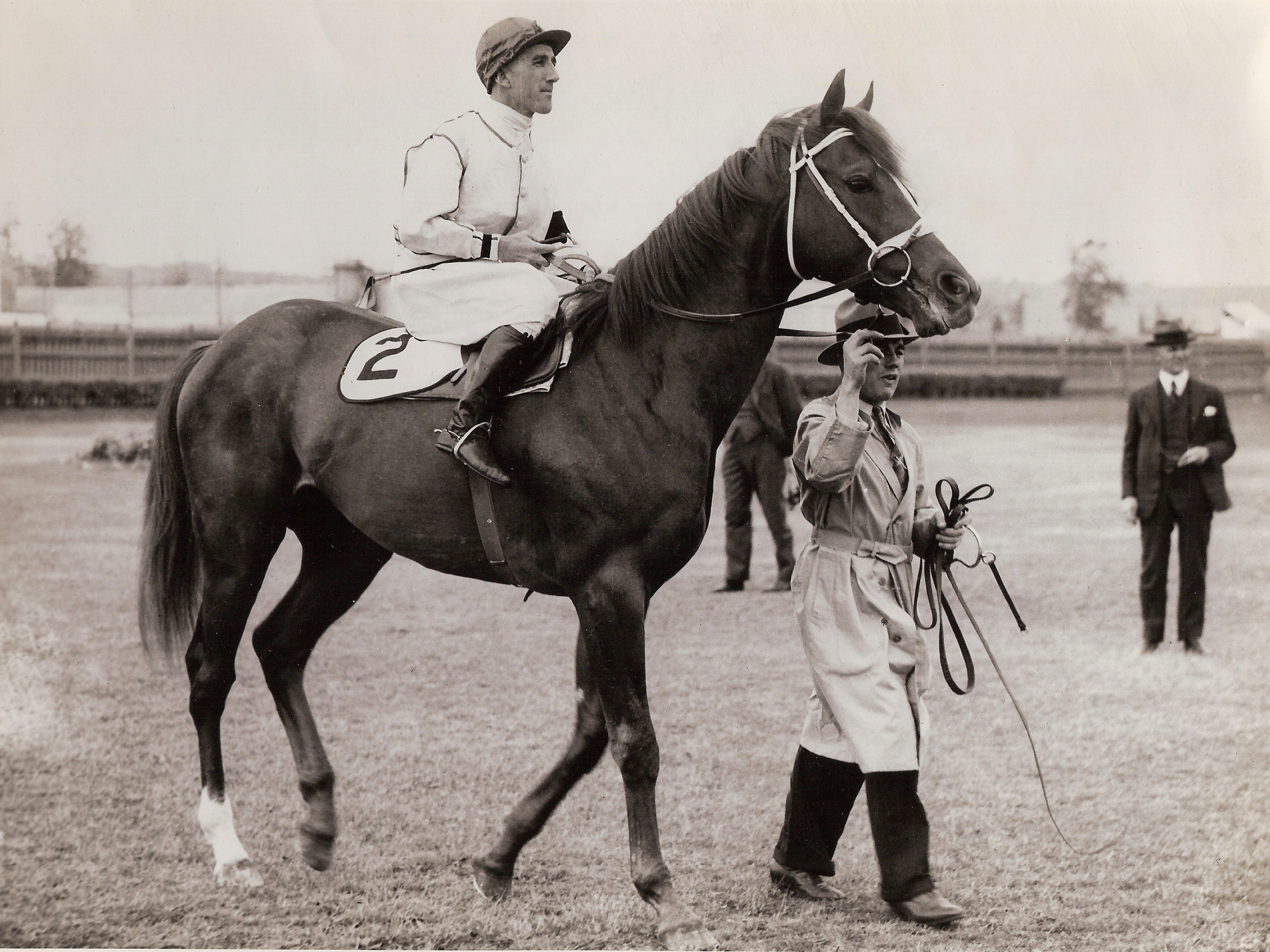
Ajax, 1938 winner

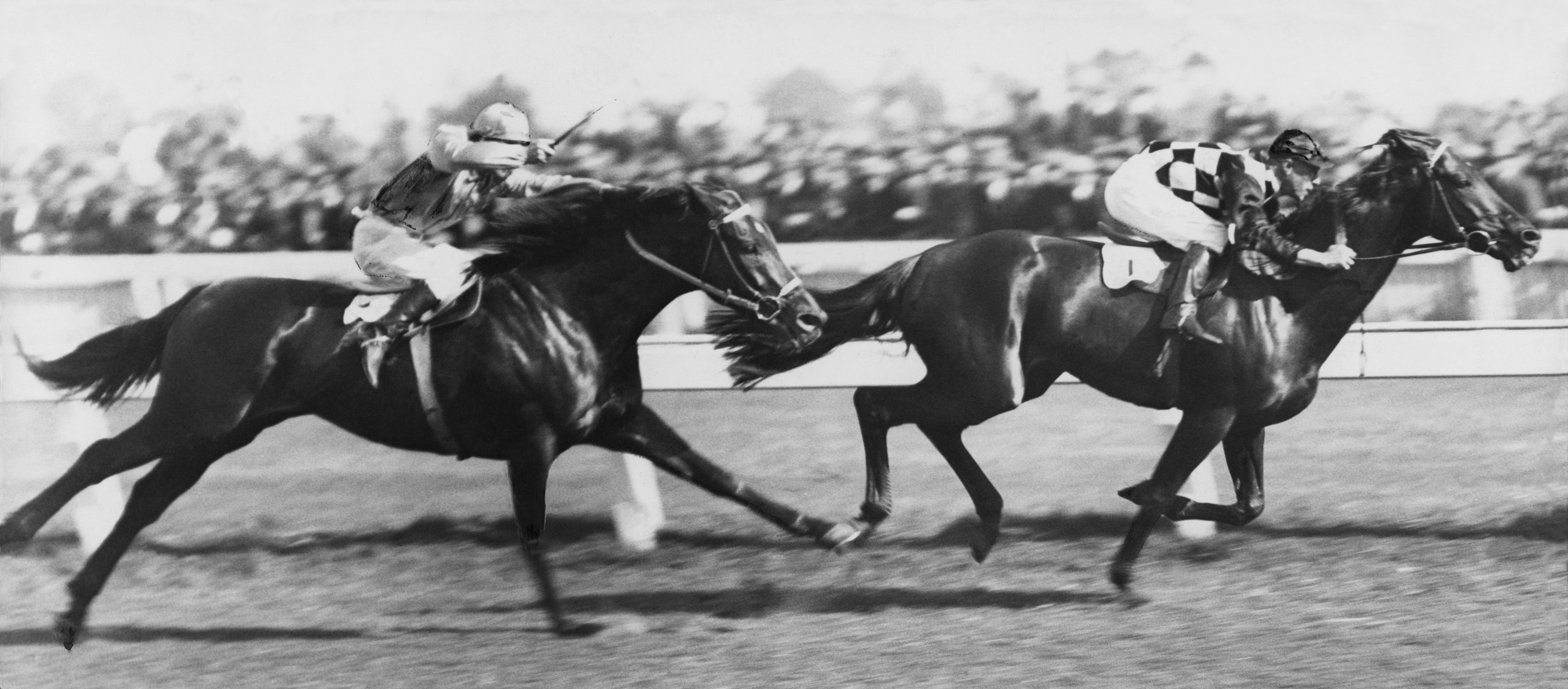
Gothic, 1927, 1928 winner

== History ==
The Newmarket Handicap is considered Australia's premier sprint race. First run in 1874, the brainchild of VRC committeeman Captain Frederick Standish who thought a "short and merry" race over six furlongs would add interest to the Club's autumn program.

The Newmarket Handicap is the only Flemington race, apart from the Melbourne Cup, in which up to 24 horses are permitted to start.

=== 1954 racebook ===
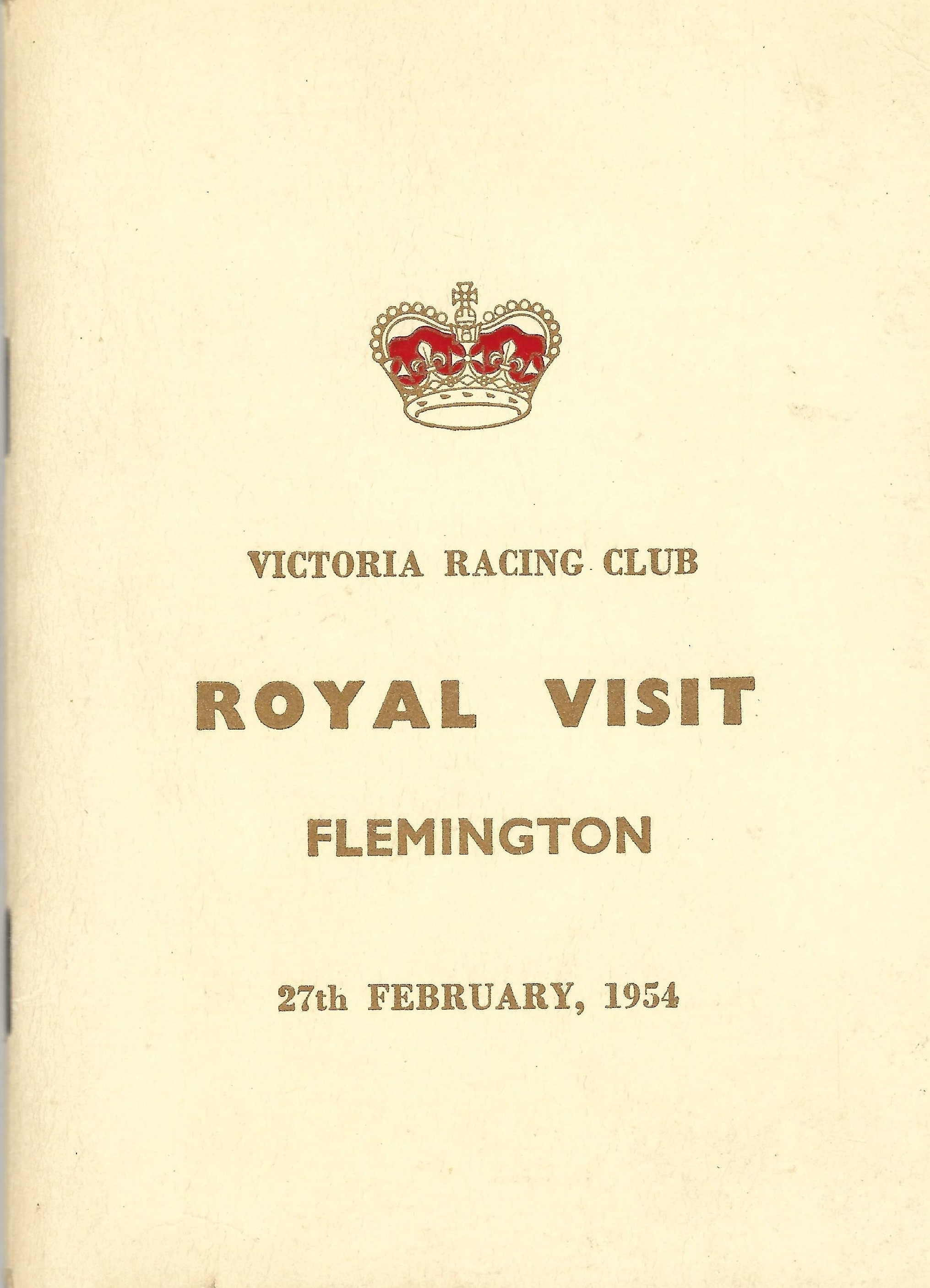
1954 VRC Newmarket Handicap racebook front cover

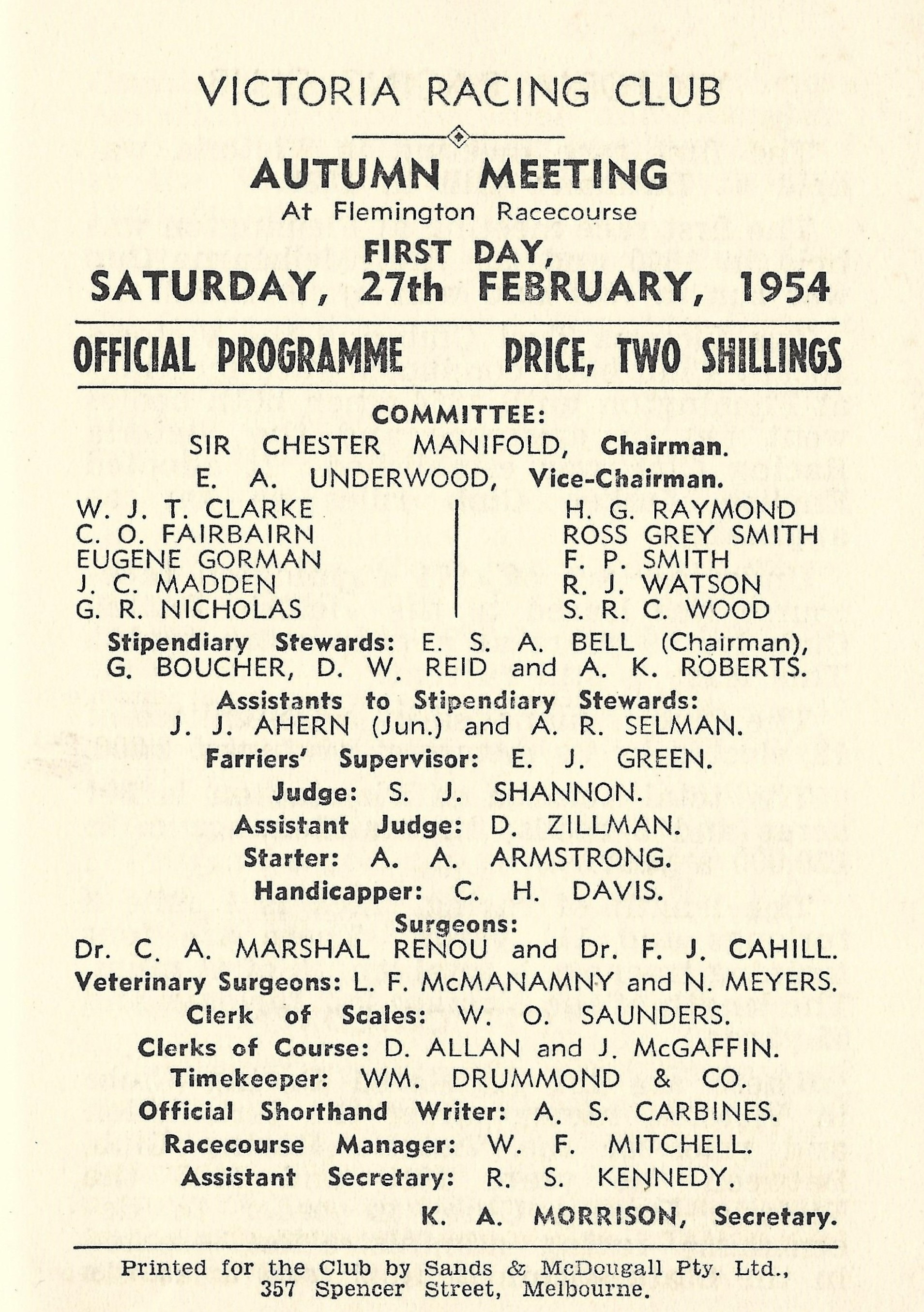
1954 VRC Newmarket Handicap raceday officials

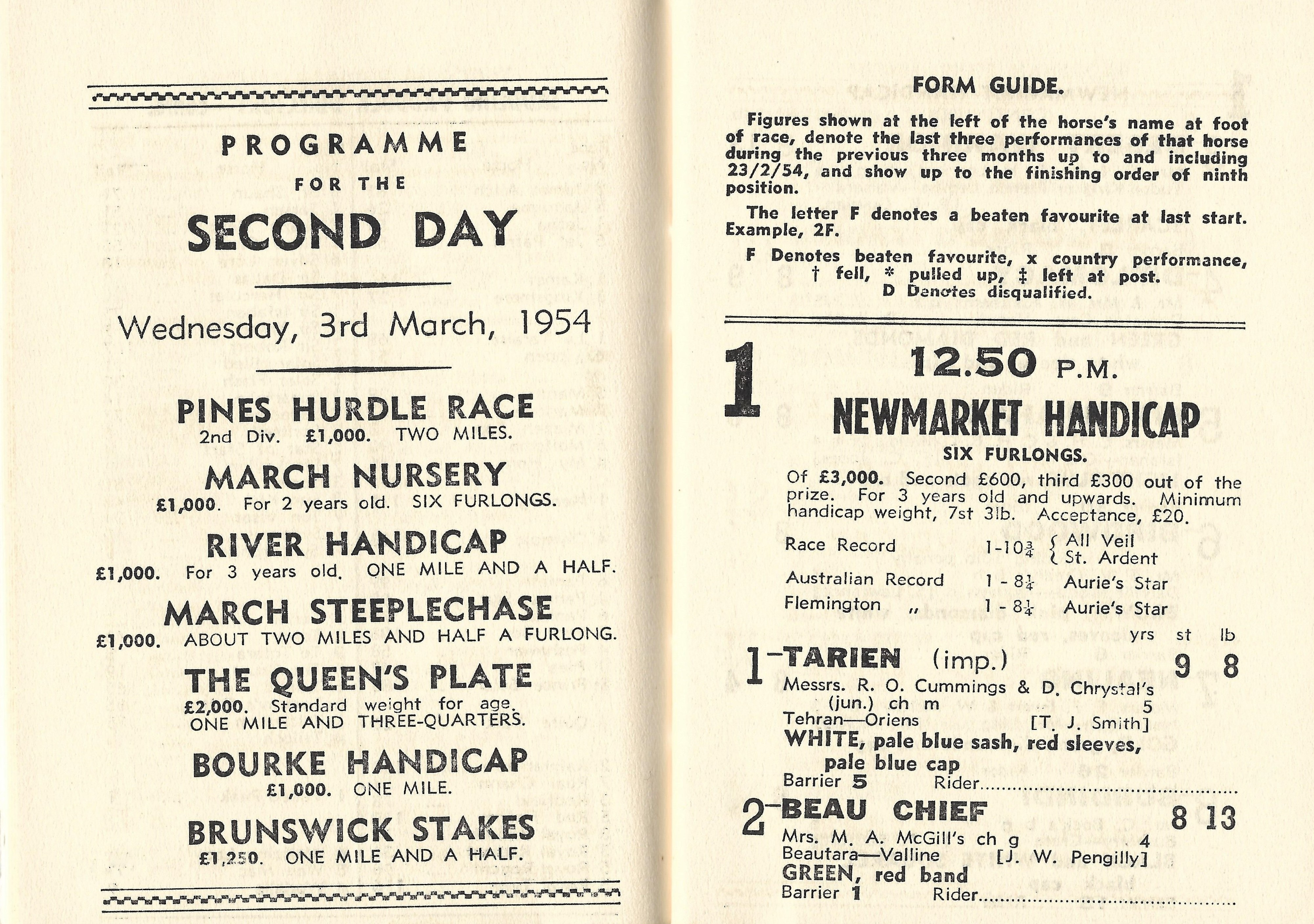
1954 VRC Newmarket Handicap starters and results

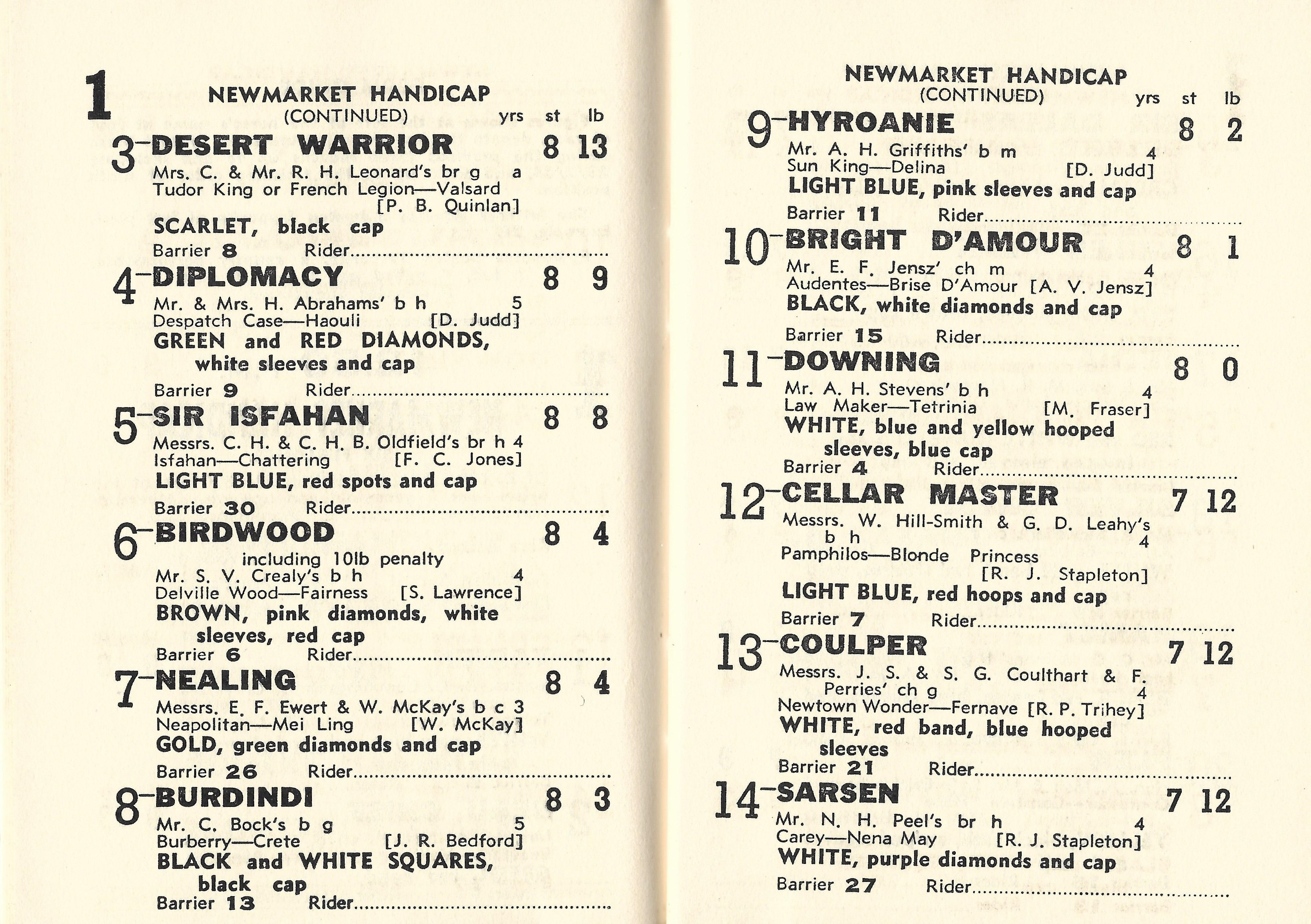
1954 VRC Newmarket Handicap showing the winner, Birdwood

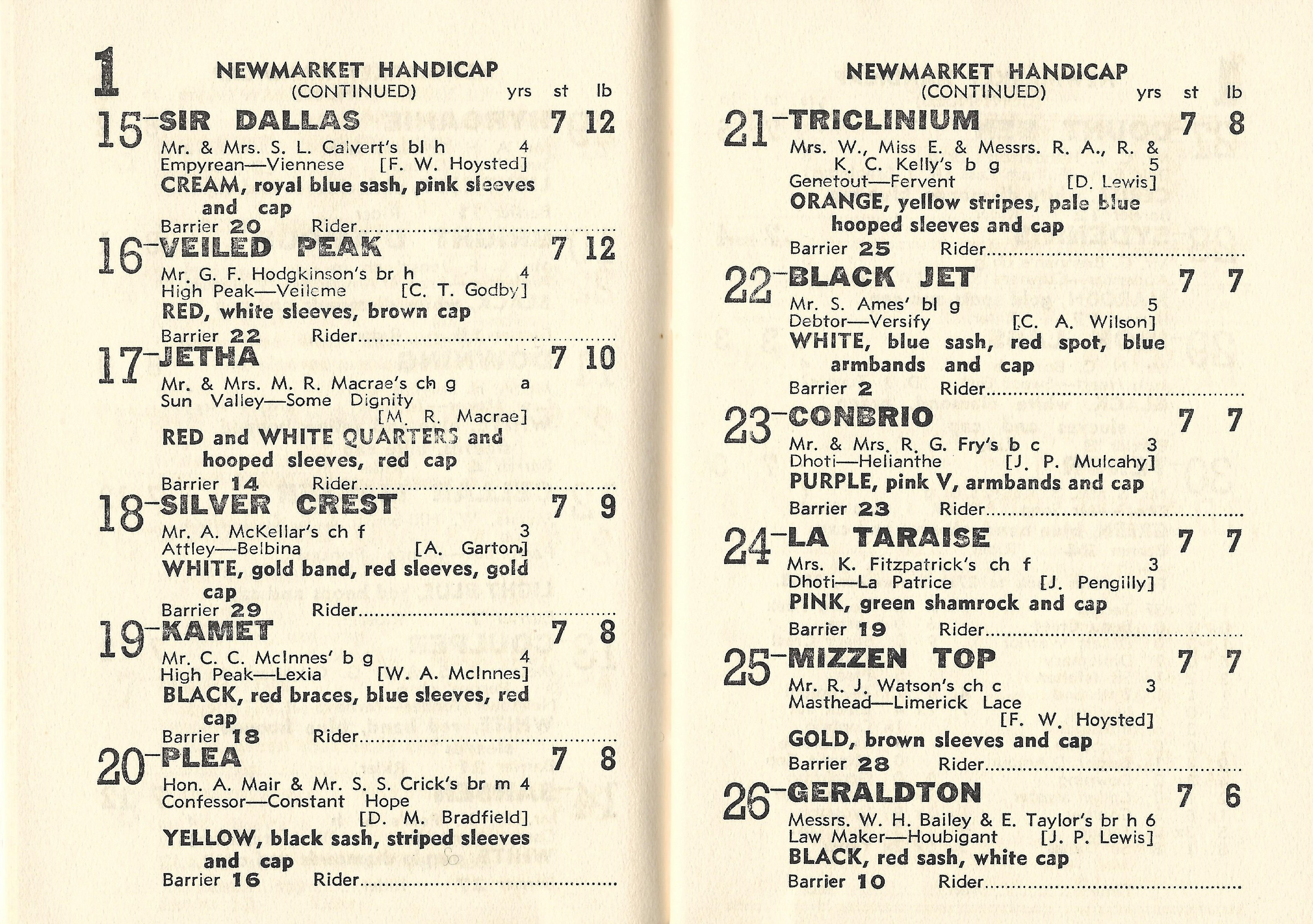
1954 VRC Newmarket Handicap starters and results

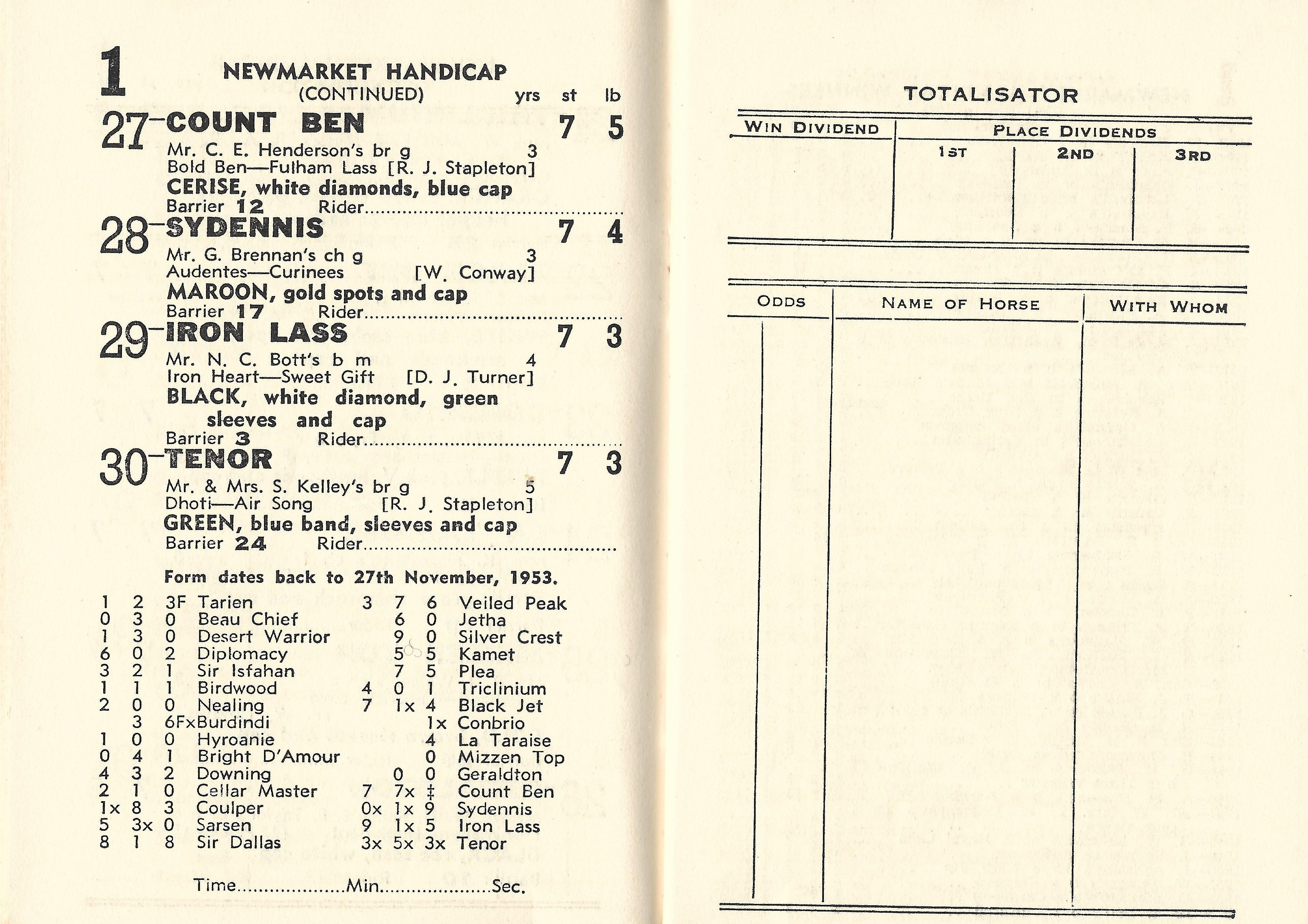
1954 VRC Newmarket Handicap starters and results

=== Distance ===
- 1874–1972 - 6 furlongs (~1200 metres)
- 1973 onwards - 1200 metres

=== Grade ===
- 1874–1979 - Principal Race
- 1979 onwards - Group 1

=== Venue ===
In 2007 the race was run at Caulfield Racecourse due to refurbishment work at Flemington Racecourse.

=== Records ===
Five horses in the history of the event have won the Newmarket Handicap twice.

- Aspen - 1880, 1881
- Gothic - 1927, 1928
- Correct - 1960, 1961
- Razor Sharp - 1982, 1983
- Redkirk Warrior - 2017, 2018

The most successful trainer has been Bart Cummings with eight wins – (1972, 1973, 1975, 1978, 1979, 1981, 1990, 1991). His grandson, James Cummings, trained the winner in 2020, 2023 and 2024.

The most successful jockey has been Damien Oliver with three wins – Alinghi (2005), Toledo (2001) and Schillaci (1992).

The race record is held by 2011 winner Black Caviar who posted the time of 1:07.36.

== Winners ==
The following are past winners of the race.

- 2026 - Caballus
- 2025 - Joliestar
- 2024 - Cylinder
- 2023 - In Secret
- 2022 - Roch 'n' Horse
- 2021 - Zoutori
- 2020 - Bivouac
- 2019 - Sunlight
- 2018 - Redkirk Warrior
- 2017 - Redkirk Warrior
- 2016 - The Quarterback
- 2015 - Brazen Beau
- 2014 - Lankan Rupee
- 2013 - Shamexpress
- 2012 - Hay List
- 2011 - Black Caviar
- 2010 - Wanted
- 2009 - Scenic Blast
- 2008 - Weekend Hussler
- 2007 - Miss Andretti
- 2006 - Takeover Target
- 2005 - Alinghi
- 2004 - Exceed And Excel
- 2003 - Belle Du Jour
- 2002 - Rubitano
- 2001 - Toledo
- 2000 - Miss Pennymoney
- 1999 - Isca
- 1998 - General Nediym
- 1997 - Ruffles
- 1996 - Brawny Spirit
- 1995 - All Our Mob
- 1994 - Mookta
- 1993 - Primacy
- 1992 - Schillaci
- 1991 - Shaftesbury Avenue
- 1990 - Gold Trump
- 1989 - Grandiose
- 1988 - Special
- 1987 - Placid Ark
- 1986 - Lockley's Tradition
- 1985 - Red Tempo
- 1984 - Heron Bridge
- 1983 - Razor Sharp
- 1982 - Razor Sharp
- 1981 - Elounda Bay
- 1980 - Dor Kon
- 1979 - Better Beyond
- 1978 - Maybe Mahal
- 1977 - Desirable
- 1976 - Toy Show
- 1975 - Cap D'antibes
- 1974 - Coolalinga
- 1973 - Century
- 1972 - Crown
- 1971 - Baguette
- 1970 - Black Onyx
- 1969 - Begonia Belle
- 1968 - Manihi
- 1967 - Nebo Road
- 1966 - Bowl King
- 1965 - Ripa
- 1964 - Rashlore
- 1963 - Our Cobber
- 1962 - Victorious
- 1961 - Correct
- 1960 - Correct
- 1959 - Gold Stakes
- 1958 - My Hour
- 1957 - King's Fair
- 1956 - Kingster
- 1955 - Swynphilos
- 1954 - Birdwood
- 1953 - Cultured
- 1952 - Cromwell
- 1951 - Carnage
- 1950 - High Jip
- 1949 - Reperio
- 1948 - Royal Gem
- 1947 - Gay Queen
- 1946 - Bernborough
- 1945 - Three Wheeler
- 1944 - Orteli
- 1943 - Denko
- 1942 - Kelos
- 1941 - All Veil
- 1940 - Mildura
- 1939 - El Golea
- 1938 - Ajax
- 1937 - Aurie's Star
- 1936 - Regular Bachelor
- 1935 - Count Ito
- 1934 - Foursome
- 1933 - Waltzing Lily
- 1932 - Lady Linden
- 1931 - Parkwood
- 1930 - Greenline
- 1929 - St. Ardent
- 1928 - Gothic
- 1927 - Gothic
- 1926 - Heroic
- 1925 - Valiard
- 1924 - Quintus
- 1923 - Sunburst
- 1922 - Rostrum
- 1921 - Blue Cross
- 1920 - Red Dome
- 1919 - Molly's Robe
- 1918 - Cetigne
- 1917 - Polycrates
- 1916 - Amata
- 1915 - Blague
- 1914 - Iownit
- 1913 - Relievo
- 1912 - Desire
- 1911 - Queen Of Scots
- 1910 - Mala
- 1909 - Soultline
- 1908 - Scotland
- 1907 - Ebullition
- 1906 - Pendant
- 1905 - Playaway
- 1904 - Mairp
- 1903 - Chantress
- 1902 - Sir Foote
- 1901 - Wakeful
- 1900 - The Watchdog
- 1899 - Forest
- 1898 - Amiable
- 1897 - Carlton
- 1896 - Maluma
- 1895 - Laundress
- 1894 - Hova
- 1893 - Fortunatus
- 1892 - Wild Rose
- 1891 - Bungebah
- 1890 - Churchill
- 1889 - Sedition
- 1888 - Cranbrook
- 1887 - Lochiel
- 1886 - William Tell
- 1885 - Coronet
- 1884 - Malua
- 1883 - Tyropean
- 1882 - Hyacinth
- 1881 - Aspen
- 1880 - Aspen
- 1879 - Diomede
- 1878 - Lady Ellen
- 1877 - Tom Kirk
- 1876 - Sultan
- 1875 - Calumny
- 1874 - Maid Of Avenel

== See also ==
- List of Australian Group races
- Group races
