= Tattersall's clubs, Melbourne =

There were two short-lived Tattersall's clubs in Melbourne, Australia, in the early 1900s: Melbourne Tattersall's Club, associated with bookmaker Sol Green, and John Wren's City Tattersall's Club.

== Melbourne Tattersall's Club ==
The Melbourne Tattersall's Club was a licensed club of 2240 members with rooms in Royal Lane, off Bourke Street about 30 yards (27 m) from the corner. It had a large room 36 by 45 feet (11 m × 14 m) downstairs, furnished with tables, Vienna chairs and so on, also several smaller rooms and upstairs a billiard room with two tables, smoking room, reading room and members' accommodation. The premises were rented from Sol Green, a prominent Melbourne bookmaker. David Cullen was secretary from October 1903. Membership was 10s. annually. It closed January 1907 amid protracted litigation.

On 18 February 1907 the Beaufort Club was opened in the same premises with David Cullen as secretary and 95 members. An application for a licence was refused by Judge Molesworth and Inspector Graham of the Metropolitan Licensing Court, on the grounds that it bore all the hallmarks of its predecessor as a venue for betting on horse races.

== City Tattersall's Club ==
John Wren founded the City Tattersall's Club at 222A–224 Bourke Street in 1903, emulating Green, his bitter rival. It was closed down in May 1906, and six members were charged with conducting a premises for betting.

== See also ==
- Tattersalls Club in Brisbane
- City Tattersalls Club in Sydney
- South Australian Tattersalls Club in Adelaide
