= 1919 Melbourne Cup =

Edition of the Melbourne Cup

- Melbourne Cup
- Location: Flemington Racecourse
- Date: 4 Nov 1919
- Distance: 2 miles
- Winning horse: Artilleryman
- Winning time: 3:24.50
- Final odds: 10/1
- Jockey: Bobbie Lewis
- Trainer: P. T. Heywood
- Owner: Samuel Hordern, Alexander Dyce Murphy
- Surface: Turf
- Attendance: 110,000

The 1919 Melbourne Cup was a two-mile handicap horse race which took place on Tuesday, 4 November 1919 at Melbourne's Flemington Racecourse.

This was the 59th edition of the race, it was the first year in which the three-handled Loving Cup was presented to the winner. This race was won by Artilleryman, trained by P. T. Heywood and ridden by Bobbie Lewis. The win set a new race record time of 3 minutes 24.5 seconds. He secured victory by at least six lengths ahead of Richmond Main. This was the third Melbourne Cup win for jockey Bobbie Lewis, he would go on to win a total of four Melbourne Cups.

== Field ==
This is the list of placegetters for the 1919 Melbourne Cup.

| Place | Name | Jockey | Trainer |
|---|---|---|---|
| 1st | Artilleryman | R. Lewis | P. T. Heywood |
| 2nd | Richmond Main | J. Killorn | F. J. Marsden |
| 3rd | Two Blues | V. Hilyard | W. Clare |

This is the finishing order for the remaining horses

| Place | Name | Trainer |
|---|---|---|
| 4th | Lucknow | R. Bradfield |
| 5th | Chrome | R. Bradfield |
| 6th | Snub | |
| 7th | Menin | |
| 8th | Ian Or | |
| 9th | Night Watch | R. Bradfield |
| 10th | Kennaquhair | B. Stringer |
| 11th | Ard-na-ree | |
| 12th | Kenilford | |
| 13th | Telecles | M. Holt |
| | Clever Jim | |
| | British Arch | |
| | Dick Meagher | |
| | Kunegetis | H. W. Morton |
| 18th | Sonny Foy | |
| 19th | Millieme | |
| 20th | Prince Viridis | J. Barden |
| SCR | ~~Surveyor~~ | |
| SCR | ~~Gamblers Gold~~ | |

== See also ==
- Melbourne Cup
- List of Melbourne Cup winners
- Victoria Racing Club
