= Ballymoss =

British-bred Thoroughbred racehorse (1954–1979)

- Sire: Mossborough
- Grandsire: Nearco
- Dam: Indian Call
- Damsire: Singapore
- Sex: Stallion
- Foaled: 1954
- Country: Great Britain
- Colour: Chestnut
- Breeder: Richard Ball
- Owner: John McShain
- Trainer: Vincent O'Brien
- Jockey: T. P. Burns
- Record: 17: 8-5-1
- Earnings: £107,165

Major wins
- Irish Derby (1957); St Leger Stakes (1957); Coronation Cup (1958); Eclipse Stakes (1958); K. George VI & Q. Elizabeth Stakes (1958); Prix de l'Arc de Triomphe (1958)

Awards
- Timeform rating: 136

Honours
- Ballymoss Stakes at the Curragh; Deltic locomotive 55018 was named Ballymoss; Ireland postage stamp (1981)
- Last updated on 14 March 2025

Ballymoss (1954–1979) was a British-bred Thoroughbred racehorse trained in Ireland by Vincent O'Brien for whom he became the first top-class horse on the Flat. In a racing career that lasted from 1956 until November 1958, the horse ran seventeen times and won eight races. In 1957, he became the first horse trained in Ireland to win the St Leger Stakes. The following season, he was Europe's leading middle-distance horse, winning the King George VI & Queen Elizabeth Stakes and the Prix de l'Arc de Triomphe.

== Background ==
Ballymoss was a chestnut horse standing just under 16 hands high bred by Richard Ball. He was sired by Mossborough, a good racehorse whose best performance was a second place in the Eclipse Stakes. Mossborough was even better as a stallion, siring winners including Belmont Stakes winner Cavan and Epsom Oaks winner Noblesse. Ballymoss's dam, Indian Call, was well bred but unsuccessful as a racehorse and was sold in 1939 for only 15 guineas.

Ballymoss was sold by his breeder at the Doncaster yearling sales. He was bought for 4,500 guineas by Vincent O'Brien, known, at that time, primarily as a leading trainer of steeplechasers. O'Brien was acting on behalf of American businessman John McShain, who operated Barclay Stable in New Jersey plus a racing operation in Ireland where he maintained a home at Killarney. Ballymoss was ridden to most of his important victories by the Australian jockey Scobie Breasley.

== Racing career ==
=== 1956: two-year-old season ===
Ballymoss ran four times as a two-year-old with limited success. His only victory came in the Laragh Maiden Plate at Leopardstown.

=== 1957: three-year-old season ===
Racing at age three, Ballymoss began by running unplaced in the seven-furlong Madrid Handicap at the Curragh but then won the Trigo Stakes at Leopardstown over one and a half miles. As a result of his win, he attracted some support in the betting for the Epsom Derby, and his odds for the race shortened from 100/1 to 33/1.

In the build-up to the Derby, Ballymoss incurred a minor injury, leading McShain to cancel his plans to travel to England for the race. At Epsom, Ballymoss exceeded expectations by finishing second of the twenty-two runners behind Crepello. In his next race, he won the Irish Derby at the Curragh. At York in August, Ballymoss started odds-on favourite for the Great Voltigeur Stakes but finished well beaten behind Brioche. Possible explanations for his defeat included an inability to cope with the soft ground and a lack of fitness.

In the St Leger Stakes at Doncaster, Ballymoss started at odds of 8/1 against fifteen opponents. His odds had drifted out from 5/1 when heavy rain softened the ground. He won the race by a length from Court Harwell, with Brioche third. On his final start of the year, Ballymoss ran in the Champion Stakes at Newmarket in October. He made no show in the race and finished unplaced behind the French filly Rose Royale. Following this effort, a plan to run Ballymoss in the Washington, D.C. International was abandoned.

=== 1958: four-year-old season ===
At age four, Ballymoss was beaten on his debut when he finished second to Doutelle in the Ormonde Stakes at Chester. He then won the Coronation Cup at Epsom from the French-trained colt Fric and the Eclipse Stakes at Sandown by six lengths from Restoration and Arctic Explorer before running in Britain's most important weight-for-age race, the King George VI & Queen Elizabeth Stakes at Ascot. He was backed down from 11/4 to 7/4 favourite on the day of the race and took the lead a furlong and a half from the finish, pulling clear to win by three lengths from Almeria.

In October, he was sent to Paris for the Prix de l'Arc de Triomphe at Longchamp. Starting at odds of 3.9/1, he was sent into the lead by Breasley early in the straight and was never seriously challenged, winning by two lengths from Fric. On his final appearance, he was shipped to Laurel Park Racecourse in the United States for the Washington, D.C. International, which also attracted entries from Germany, the Soviet Union, Venezuela and Argentina. He was made favourite despite the misgivings of Vincent O'Brien, who felt that he would be unsuited by the relatively tight turns and short straight. He finished third, beaten three and a half lengths by Tudor Era and losing second place by a head to the Australian champion Sailor's Guide. He was subsequently promoted to second when Tudor Era was disqualified.

== Honours, awards and assessment ==
When Ballymoss was retired at the end of the 1958 racing season, his earnings of £114,150 were a record for a horse trained in Britain or Ireland, surpassing the mark of £76,577 set by Tulyar in 1952. Ballymoss's record stood until it was broken by Ragusa in 1963.

The Ballymoss Stakes, named in his honour, was run at the Curragh between 1962 and 1984.

Following the London & North Eastern Railway tradition of naming locomotives after winning racehorses, British Rail Class 55 diesel locomotive no. D9018 (later 55018) was named after the horse on 24 November 1961, and remained in service until 12 October 1981.

== Stud record ==
Ballymoss was sent to stand at stud at Whitsbury Manor Stud in Fordingbridge, Hampshire. He became successful as a sire of stallions, ranking second on the 1967 General Sires List and third in 1968. Notably, he sired Royal Palace, winner of the 1967 Epsom Derby and 2,000 Guineas, plus Ballymoss Nisei (バリモスニセイ) who won in Japan and where he stood at stud.

One of the leading broodmare sires in the United Kingdom, Ballymoss was the damsire of:

- Stage Door Johnny, 1968 Belmont Stakes winner and U.S. Champion 3-Yr-Old Colt
- Northern Sunset, 1995 Kentucky Broodmare of the Year
- Levmoss, who won the 1969 Prix de l'Arc de Triomphe, Prix du Cadran, Ascot Gold Cup
- Le Moss, the only horse to win the Stayers' Triple Crown twice (the Ascot Gold Cup, the Goodwood Cup, and the Doncaster Cup)
- Teenoso, whose wins include The Derby, Grand Prix de Saint-Cloud and the King George VI & Queen Elizabeth Stakes

One of Ballymoss's notable international descendants is Santorín (1970), a Peruvian champion sired by his son Biomydrin. Santorín won the Peruvian Triple Crown in 1973 and later triumphed in the Gran Premio Latinoamericano—the most prestigious international race in Latin America—defeating the best horses from Argentina, Chile, and Uruguay.

== Pedigree ==
Pedigree of Ballymoss, chestnut stallion 1954
Sire Mossborough	Nearco	Pharos	Phalaris
Sire Mossborough	Nearco	Pharos	Scapa Flow
Sire Mossborough	Nearco	Nogara	Havresac
Sire Mossborough	Nearco	Nogara	Catnip
Sire Mossborough	All Moonshine	Bobsleigh	Gainsborough*
Sire Mossborough	All Moonshine	Bobsleigh	Toboggan
Sire Mossborough	All Moonshine	Selene	Chaucer
Sire Mossborough	All Moonshine	Selene	Serenissima
Dam Indian Call	Singapore	Gainsborough*	Bayardo
Dam Indian Call	Singapore	Gainsborough*	Rosedrop
Dam Indian Call	Singapore	Tetrabbazia	The Tetrarch
Dam Indian Call	Singapore	Tetrabbazia	Abbazia
Dam Indian Call	Flittemere	Buchan	Sunstar
Dam Indian Call	Flittemere	Buchan	Hamoaze
Dam Indian Call	Flittemere	Keysoe	Swynford
Dam Indian Call	Flittemere	Keysoe	Keystone II (Family: 2-u)

- Ballymoss was inbred 3x4 to Gainsborough, meaning that this stallion appears in both the third and fourth generations of his pedigree.
