= Comedy King =

British thoroughbred racehorse

- Sire: Persimmon
- Grandsire: St. Simon
- Dam: Tragedy Queen
- Damsire: Gallinule
- Sex: Stallion
- Foaled: 1907
- Died: 1929
- Country: Great Britain
- Colour: Brown
- Breeder: Sol Green
- Owner: Sol Green
- Trainer: James Lynch
- Record: 28: 8-7-4

Major wins
- Futurity Stakes (1910); Spring Stakes (1910); Melbourne Cup (1910); St George Stakes (1911); Eclipse Stakes (1911)

Comedy King (1907–1929) was a British bred thoroughbred racehorse that raced his entire career in Australia. He is most notable for winning the 1910 Melbourne Cup and becoming the first Northern-Hemisphere bred horse to do so.

== Background ==
Comedy King was owned by Sol Green, one of Australia's biggest bookmakers and one of the country's richest men. On a trip to England in 1906 Green bought some racehorses and among them was the broodmare Tragedy Queen, which was in foal to the 1896 English Derby winner and legendary racehorse Persimmon. After the foal was weaned it was exported to Australia where it was to race for Green under the name Comedy King.

== Racing career ==
Comedy King won eight races in his career, with his most famous victory being the 1910 Melbourne Cup. Starting at the odds of 10/1 he won by a margin of a 1/2 neck carrying 7st 11 lb (49.5 kg) and collected first prize money of £6,178.

== Stud career ==
Comedy King retired from racing in 1912 and commenced stud duties at owner Sol Green's Shipley Stud near Warrnambool, Victoria. When the stud was dispersed in 1918, Comedy King was secured by pastoralist Norman Falkiner for 7,300 guineas. Comedy King had great success as a sire, producing the 1919 Melbourne Cup winner Artilleryman and the 1922 Cup winner, King Ingoda. He was also crowned Australian Champion stallion in 1920 and 1923.

Comedy King died in December 1929 and was buried at Falkiner's Noorilim Stud. A few months after his death, Comedy King's remains were exhumed and his bones sent to be displayed at the newly formed Australian Institute of Anatomy. However, it's unknown if Comedy King's skeleton was ever assembled, and as recently as 2013 an attempt was made to match up boxes of equine bones at the institute to see if the horse could be “put back together”.

== Pedigree ==
Pedigree of Comedy King (GB) 1910
Sire Persimmon (GB) 1897	St. Simon (GB); 1881	Galopin	Vedette
Sire Persimmon (GB) 1897	St. Simon (GB); 1881	Galopin	Flying Duchess
Sire Persimmon (GB) 1897	St. Simon (GB); 1881	St. Angela	King Tom
Sire Persimmon (GB) 1897	St. Simon (GB); 1881	St. Angela	Adeline
Sire Persimmon (GB) 1897	Perdita (GB); 1881	Hampton	Lord Clifden
Sire Persimmon (GB) 1897	Perdita (GB); 1881	Hampton	Lady Langden
Sire Persimmon (GB) 1897	Perdita (GB); 1881	Hermione	Young Melbourne*^
Sire Persimmon (GB) 1897	Perdita (GB); 1881	Hermione	La Belle Helene
Dam Tragedy Queen (GB) 1900	Gallinule (GB); 1884	Isonomy	Sterling
Dam Tragedy Queen (GB) 1900	Gallinule (GB); 1884	Isonomy	Isola Bella
Dam Tragedy Queen (GB) 1900	Gallinule (GB); 1884	Moorhen	Hermit
Dam Tragedy Queen (GB) 1900	Gallinule (GB); 1884	Moorhen	Skirmisher Mare
Dam Tragedy Queen (GB) 1900	Clarion (GB); 1891	Ben Battle	Rataplan
Dam Tragedy Queen (GB) 1900	Clarion (GB); 1891	Ben Battle	Young Alice^
Dam Tragedy Queen (GB) 1900	Clarion (GB); 1891	Black Witch	Xenophon
Dam Tragedy Queen (GB) 1900	Clarion (GB); 1891	Black Witch	The White Witch

*^ Comedy King is inbred 4S x 5D to the stallion Young Melbourne, meaning that he appears fourth generation on the sire side of his pedigree and fifth generation (via Young Alice)^ on the dam side of his pedigree.
