= Perdita (horse) =

British-bred Thoroughbred racehorse

Perdita II
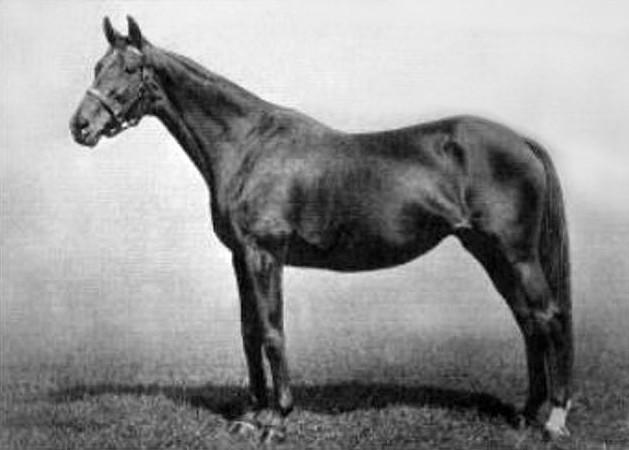
- Sire: Hampton (GB)
- Grandsire: Lord Clifden (GB)
- Dam: Hermione (GB)
- Damsire: Young Melbourne (GB)
- Sex: Mare
- Foaled: 1881
- Country: Great Britain
- Colour: Bay
- Breeder: John Campbell, 2nd Earl Cawdor
- Owner: Mr A. Falconer; Albert Edward, as Prince of Wales
- Trainer: John Porter
- Record: 7 wins

Major wins
- Chesterfield Nursery Stakes; Ayr Gold Cup; Liverpool Cup; Great Cheshire Handicap

Honours
- Cluster Mare
- Last updated on 18 December 2010

Perdita II (1881-1899) was a British Thoroughbred race mare who was an outstanding broodmare.

== Racing record ==
She commenced her racing career as a selling plater, but proved a useful racemare by winning seven races. Perdita II was purchased for the Prince of Wales in 1888 for £900.

== Stud record ==
Perdita II was more influential as a broodmare, producing the full brothers Florizel II (won Goodwood Cup, £7,858 and sired three Classic winners); Persimmon, Sandringham (unraced, exported to the US and sired some winners), and Diamond Jubilee. Her sons earned over 75,000 guineas. In all, she produced 12 foals. Owing to the success of her descendants she was listed as a Cluster Mare, which is a Thoroughbred brood mare that has produced two or more winners of five or more of the eight most important and valuable races, within six generations.

Perdita II died in 1899.

== See also ==
- List of leading Thoroughbred racehorses
