= Persimmon (horse) =

British-bred Thoroughbred racehorse

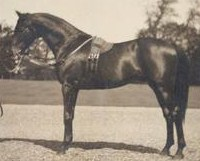
- Sire: St Simon
- Grandsire: Galopin
- Dam: Perdita II
- Damsire: Hampton
- Sex: Stallion
- Foaled: 1893
- Country: United Kingdom of Great Britain and Ireland
- Colour: Bay
- Breeder: Prince of Wales
- Owner: Prince of Wales
- Trainer: Richard Marsh
- Record: 9:7-1-1
- Earnings: £34,706

Major wins
- Coventry Stakes (1895); Richmond Stakes (1895); Epsom Derby (1896); St Leger (1896); Jockey Club Stakes (1896); Eclipse Stakes (1897); Ascot Gold Cup (1897)

Awards
- Leading sire in Britain & Ireland (1902, 1906, 1908, 1912); Leading broodmare sire in Britain & Ireland (1914, 1915, 1919)

Honours
- Life-sized statue at Sandringham Stud; LNER Class A1 locomotive no. 2549 was named Persimmon

Persimmon (1893–1908) was a British Thoroughbred race horse and sire. In a racing career that lasted from June 1895 to July 1897 he ran nine times and won seven races. His victories included the 1896 Epsom Derby, one of the first horse races ever filmed, by Robert W. Paul. His other important victories included the St Leger Stakes, the Ascot Gold Cup and the Eclipse Stakes. He was also notable for his rivalry with another English colt St Frusquin, who inflicted his only two defeats. Both horses shared the same sire.

== Background ==
Persimmon, an exceptionally good-looking but highly strung bay horse, was bred by his owner, the Prince of Wales. He was trained throughout his career by Richard Marsh at his Egerton House stable at Newmarket, Suffolk.

Persimmon's sire, St Simon was an undefeated racehorse who was considered one of the best British runners of the 19th century. In an outstanding stud career he won nine sires' championships, having sired ten Classic winners. Perdita, the dam of Persimmon, was a successful racehorse who was bought by the Prince on the advice of John Porter. As a broodmare she produced, in addition to Persimmon, the Triple Crown winner Diamond Jubilee and the Jockey Club Cup winner Florizel II.

== Racing career ==
=== 1895: two-year-old season ===
Persimmon was one of the leading British two-year-old of 1895, winning two of his three races. He made his debut at Royal Ascot on 18 June, where he started 2/1 favourite for the Coventry Stakes. Ridden by John Watts he led from the start and won "in great style" by three lengths from Meli Melo. Although the race was a five and a half furlong sprint, Persimmon was already being described as a potential Derby contender: as a brother to the stayer Florizel he was not expected to have stamina problems. He reappeared a month later at Goodwood and in the Richmond Stakes. Starting the 1/2 favourite the Prince's "flying two-year-old" had no difficulties in winning easily by a length from Champfleurie, who was receiving eight pounds.

Persimmon's final start of the season was in the Middle Park Stakes at Newmarket, one of the year's most prestigious two-year-old races, in which he was matched against another outstanding colt in St. Frusquin. Before the race Persimmon had developed a respiratory infection and Marsh only ran him in the race with reluctance. On 11 October he started 2/1 favourite for the race, but never looked likely to win and finished third behind St Frusquin and the filly Omladina, beaten a total of four and a half lengths.

Despite his defeat, Persimmon remained a leading fancy for the following year's Classics, and there was considerable speculation regarding the possible outcome of a rematch with St Frusquin in either the 2000 Guineas or the Derby.

=== 1896: three-year-old season ===
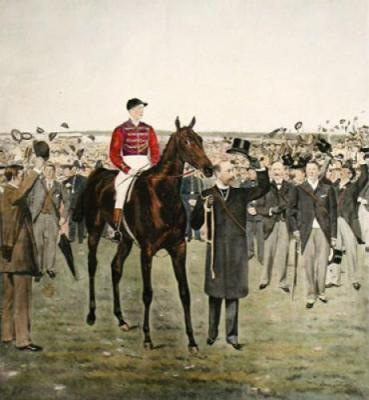
Persimmon is led in by his owner after the Derby

Early in 1896, Persimmon and St Frusquin were 5/2 joint favourites for the 2000 Guineas, but Persimmon was slow to find his form and worked poorly in training. He was withdrawn from the race, which was won easily by his rival. His preparations for the Derby did not go smoothly: his performances in a demanding schedule of exercise gallops were inconsistent, and he was almost withdrawn after one particularly poor effort three weeks before the race. On the eve of the Derby, Persimmon caused further concern when he refused to board the train to Epsom and eventually had to be virtually carried on board by a large group of volunteers.

For the Derby at Epsom on 3 June, Marsh decided, perhaps in view of Persimmon's known temperament problems, to saddle the colt near the start, missing the traditional parade in front of the stands. Persimmon started the 5/1 second choice in a field of eleven, with St Frusquin the 8/13 favourite. Ridden by John Watts, Persimmon was held up at the back of the field in the early stages as Bay Ronald and Gulistan made the running. Watts moved him forward steadily and he turned for home in third place behind Bay Ronald and St Frusquin, and the race soon developed into a match between the first and second favourites. St Frusquin had a slight advantage until the final furlong but Watts then made his challenge and Persimmon took the lead and ran on strongly to take the race by a neck, winning rather more easily than the margin suggested. The first royal victory for more than a century was greeted with prolonged and "deafening" cheering and "tremendous enthusiasm", with the police having difficulty clearing a way through the crowds for the Prince to lead in his winner. Persimmon's winning time of 2:42.0 broke the race record by a full second.

At Newmarket on 2 July, Persimmon and St Frusquin met for a third time in the £10,000 Princess of Wales's Stakes at Newmarket. On this occasion, Persimmon had to concede three pounds to his rival and twelve pounds to the Duke of Westminster's colt Regret, who started favourite. The field also included the 1895 Classic winners Kirkconnel and Sir Visto. Persimmon took the lead just after half way but after a "very exciting" race he was beaten half a length by St Frusquin, with Regret third.

In the autumn of 1896 Persimmon returned to the racecourse for the St Leger on 9 September at Doncaster and with St Frusquin retired after sustaining a leg injury, he started 2/11 favourite against six opponents. The Duke of Westminster's colt Labrador was 6/1 second favourite, with the rest of the runners starting at least 66/1. Watts settled the colt in fourth place in the early stages, before moving him up to dispute the lead with Labrador entering the straight. He pulled ahead to win easily by one and a half lengths "amid great cheering."

On his final start of the season Persimmon ran in the Jockey Club Stakes over ten furlongs at Newmarket on 1 October. Starting at odds of 8/11, he pulled his way to the front half a mile from the finish and won the £10,000 prize very easily by two lengths from Sir Visto This was a particularly impressive performance, with Persimmon showing "fire and dash" to win in the style of a top class horse.

=== 1897: four-year-old season ===
Persimmon was kept in training as a four-year-old, with the Ascot Gold Cup as his principal objective. He was reported to have thrived over the winter, but as in his two previous campaigns he did not appear until June.

In the Gold Cup on 17 June Persimmon faced only three rivals, but the field was a strong one: the Irish horse Winkfield's Pride had won the Cesarewitch Handicap and was reported to be strongly fancied by his connections; Limasol had won The Oaks while Love Wisely had won the Gold Cup as a three-year-old in 1896. Watts held the colt up in last place until making his challenge in the straight. Persimmon left the opposition as if they had been "standing still" and pulled away to win easily by eight lengths from Winkfield's Pride Persimmon had made "a sorry example" of three top class performers and his win was reportedly greeted with unprecedented scenes of "loyal enthusiasm".

On 15 July Persimmon ran in the £10,000 Eclipse Stakes, over ten furlongs at Sandown and started at odds of 12/100 against four rivals. Watts sent the colt into the lead early in the straight and after holding off a strong challenge from the Derby runner-up Velasquez, he drew away to win by two lengths, with the rest of the runners at least four lengths further away. Persimmon returned from the race very sore, reportedly because of the hardness of the ground, and was forced to miss an intended run in the Goodwood Cup. The win had taken Persimmon's lifetime earnings up to £34,706.

The Triple Crown success of the three-year-old Galtee More raised speculation about a possible match with Persimmon. In September, the managers of Lingfield Park Racecourse put forward a proposal for a £3,700 weight-for-age invitation race between the two Derby winners to take place over one mile on 2 October. Persimmon, however, never fully recovered from his run at Sandown and was retired to stud.

== Popular culture ==
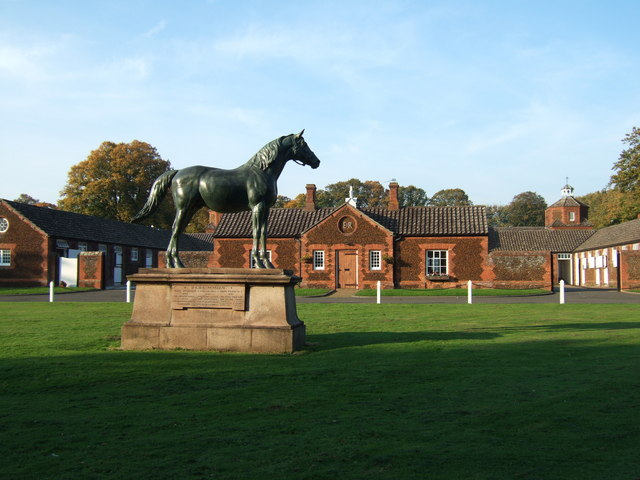
Statue of Persimmon at Sandringham

The 1895 Derby had been filmed by Birt Acres, but the film was lost for many years, leading the film of Persimmon's win by Robert Paul being long regarded as the earliest film of a horse race and one of the first examples of Newsreel coverage. The Derby was recorded on a film described by the press as "2000 impressions on one long negative" which was later projected by "kinematograph". The film of the race, described in the press as an "animated picture" was a popular attraction at London's Alhambra Music Hall in the summer of 1896. By the end of the year, the film was being exhibited to appreciative audiences in Australia, and by early 1897 it was being shown in New Zealand by Carl Hertz. The race was also the subject of a "stirring" popular ballad entitled "The Prince's Derby", by Campbell Rae-Brown. In 1925 the London & North Eastern Railway (LNER) began a tradition of naming locomotives after winning racehorses; LNER Class A1 locomotive no. 2549 (later nos. 518 and 50, BR no. 60050) was named Persimmon after this horse, and remained in service until June 1963.

== Stud record ==
Persimmon became a successful sire, and amongst his offspring were:

Foaled	Name	Sex	Major Wins/Achievements
1899	Sceptre	Mare	Woodcote Stakes, Epsom Oaks, 1000 Guineas Stakes, St Leger Stakes, 2000 Guineas Stakes
1903	Keystone II	Mare	Epsom Oaks
1905	Your Majesty	Stallion	St Leger Stakes
1906	Perola	Mare	Epsom Oaks
1907	Comedy King	Stallion	Melbourne Cup, Futurity Stakes
1908	Prince Palatine	Stallion	St Leger Stakes, Jockey Club Stakes, Ascot Gold Cup, Doncaster Cup, Coronation Cup

He headed the list of sires of winners four times and was head of the damsire list three times during his relatively short stud career. Persimmon died of a fractured pelvis at the age of fifteen in 1908. His stuffed and mounted head is on display at the National Horseracing Museum in Newmarket.

== Sire line tree ==
- Persimmon
  - Out Of Reach
    - George Smith
  - Zinfandel
  - Royal Dream
    - Coq Gaulois
      - Coq Bruyere
      - Coq D'Espirit
        - Ksar D'Esprit
  - Sea King
    - Paul Jones
  - Your Majesty
    - Agueros
    - Henry Lee
    - Quemao
  - Comedy King
    - Artilleryman
    - King Ingoda
  - Prince Palatine
    - Donnacona
    - Prince Galahad
      - Nothing Venture
        - Dink
    - Prince Pal
      - Mate
        - Elkridge
    - Rose Prince
      - Prince Rose
        - Joli Ange
        - Pappageno
        - Princequillo
        - Prince Bio
        - Prince Chevalier
      - Mousson

== Pedigree ==
Pedigree of Persimmon (GB), bay stallion, 1893
Sire St Simon (GB) 1881	Galopin; 1872	Vedette	Voltigeur (Note: Persimmon is inbred 4S x 5D to the stallion Voltigeur, meaning that he appears fourth generation on the sire side of his pedigree and fifth generation (via Teterrima) on the dam side of his pedigree.)
Sire St Simon (GB) 1881	Galopin; 1872	Vedette	Mrs Ridgway
Sire St Simon (GB) 1881	Galopin; 1872	Flying Duchess	The Flying Dutchman
Sire St Simon (GB) 1881	Galopin; 1872	Flying Duchess	Merope
Sire St Simon (GB) 1881	St Angela; 1865	King Tom	Harkaway
Sire St Simon (GB) 1881	St Angela; 1865	King Tom	Pocahontas
Sire St Simon (GB) 1881	St Angela; 1865	Adeline	Ion
Sire St Simon (GB) 1881	St Angela; 1865	Adeline	Little Fairy
Dam Perdita (GB) 1881	Hampton; 1872	Lord Clifden	Newminster
Dam Perdita (GB) 1881	Hampton; 1872	Lord Clifden	The Slave (Note: Persimmon is inbred 5D x 4D to the stallion Melbourne, meaning that he appears fifth generation (via The Slave) and fourth generation on the dam side of his pedigree.)
Dam Perdita (GB) 1881	Hampton; 1872	Lady Langden	Kettledrum
Dam Perdita (GB) 1881	Hampton; 1872	Lady Langden	Haricot
Dam Perdita (GB) 1881	Hermione; 1875	Young Melbourne	Melbourne
Dam Perdita (GB) 1881	Hermione; 1875	Young Melbourne	Clarissa
Dam Perdita (GB) 1881	Hermione; 1875	La Belle Helene	St Albans
Dam Perdita (GB) 1881	Hermione; 1875	La Belle Helene	Teterrima (Family: 7)
