= Edwin Piper =

British flat racing jockey

Personal information
- Born: 1888 Exeter
- Died: 16 October 1951 (aged 62–63) Epsom
- Occupation: Jockey

Horse racing career
- Sport: Horse racing

Major racing wins
- Major race wins: Derby Stakes (1913)

Significant horses
- Aboyeur

Edwin Piper (1888 - 1951) was a British flat racing jockey, who won the 1913 Epsom Derby, also known as the "Suffragette Derby" due to the death of suffragette Emily Davison during the race, on Aboyeur.

== Racing career ==
Piper began riding in the show ring and started his racing career as apprentice to H. D. Bates in 1905. He was not a fashionable jockey of the time and prior to the Derby win for which he is noted, his big race successes were limited, although he did win the Great Jubilee Handicap at Kempton Park in 1908, weighing out at 6st 12, and the Chester Vase.

Victory in the 1913 Derby was a surprise. Not only was Aboyeur a big outsider, he was not Piper's intended mount for the race. Piper only came to ride him after the horse he was supposed to ride, Knight's Key, was scratched. The race outcome itself can also be considered fortunate. Piper took an early lead in the race and maintained it into the straight. As challengers came forward, the favourite, Craganour, bumped Aboyeur, who then hampered the horses on his inside as he veered towards the rail. In response, Piper raised his whip to Aboyeur with his left hand, causing the horse to hang back to the right, bumping Craganour. After repeated bumps between the two throughout the closing stages, Craganour crossed the line first in a blanket finish with other horses. In the subsequent enquiry, Piper expected to be reprimanded by the stewards. Instead, it was Craganour that was disqualified for interference, leaving Aboyeur as the winner.

Following the Derby win, Piper also won the Ascot Stakes on Rivoli, trained by Richard Wootton. In 1911, he won 43 of his 380 races and 48 of 470 in 1913. However, he won few races following the start of World War I and dropped out of racing. He died in Epsom in 1951.

== Major wins ==
(United Kingdom) Great Britain

- Derby Stakes – Aboyeur (1913)

== See also ==
- List of jockeys

== Bibliography ==
- Mortimer, Roger; Onslow, Richard; Willett, Peter (1978). Biographical Encyclopaedia of British Racing. London: Macdonald and Jane's. ISBN 0-354-08536-0.
