= Reginald Stuart Goddard =

British zookeeper (1890–1946)

- Born: August 27, 1890
- Died: December 25, 1946 (aged 56); Cambridge
- Occupations: Zookeeper, animal breeder
- Known for: Founding Chessington Zoo

Reginald Stuart Goddard (27 August 1890 – 25 December 1946) was a British Zookeeper, notable for founding Chessington Zoo, and for making Paignton Zoo a public entertainment attraction.

== Personal life ==
Reginald, known as "RS" was born to Arthur Goddard, owner of a firm which manufactured slate for billiards tables, and his wife Dorothea.

He married Doris Ena Layborn in 1915, and they had three children, Joan, Moira, and James.

== Career ==
=== Before zookeeping ===
During World War I, Goddard served for two years from 1917 in the Royal Naval Air Service, eventually qualifying as a balloon pilot and serving at RNAS Kite Balloon Base Tipnor in Portsmouth. Following demobilization in 1919, he went to work for his family firm - Goddard and Son, Billiard Slate Manufacturers - in Battersea, where he eventually became managing director. In 1928 Reginald pleaded guilty to failing to provide a proper safety guard on a machine at the Goddard and Son factory in Battersea, despite having been previously warned, and having compensated a worker for loss of a finger.

In 1930, he was awarded a patent for a new type of asymmetric billiards practice table, to allow players to practice their shots, and this was manufactured by Thurston.

He expanded the business to include opening a chain of billiard halls across London, and then later came to own some pet stores which started his animal keeping and expansion into more exotic animals.

=== Chessington ===
Goddard posing with a monkey at Chessington

Goddard had been collecting exotic animals in a private collection, and he was driving past the "Burnt Stub" site in Chessington when he saw a house and land for sale. He purchased the land and set about creating a public attraction with a range of animals and other entertainments, including a circus, funfair, and miniature railway, spending a reported £12,000. It opened as "Surrey Zoological Gardens" on 28 July 1931, and in the first six months of trading attracted 42,000 people.

Reginald suffered an injury to his hand caused by a lion, "Billy" in 1931. As a thanks to Epsom Cottage Hospital where his injury was treated, he returned later in the year with three bears and a monkey to entertain the child patients.

When applying for a liquor license for the zoo in early 1932 there were accusations that Reginald was, in fact, disgraced police sergeant George Goddard who had been convicted of accepting bribes when heading the vice squad at Vine Street police station, accepting money from nightclub owner Kate Meyrick. The licensing committee heard that George Goddard and Meyrick were going to start a nightclub at Chessington. This connection was emphatically denied by Goddard. This rumour persisted over decades, including being stated as fact in the book Crime in London by former Metropolitan Police Assistant Commissioner Gilbert Kelland. The license was granted at the second hearing in March, after initial refusal.

Later in 1932, Reginald's wife lost a diamond earring which was swallowed by a monkey at the zoo.

In 1936 Goddard successfully sued Lady Waechter de Grimston for libel after she wrote a letter to the RSPCA complaining about the way in which penguins were being kept at Chessington, describing conditions as "disgusting".

=== Paignton Zoo ===
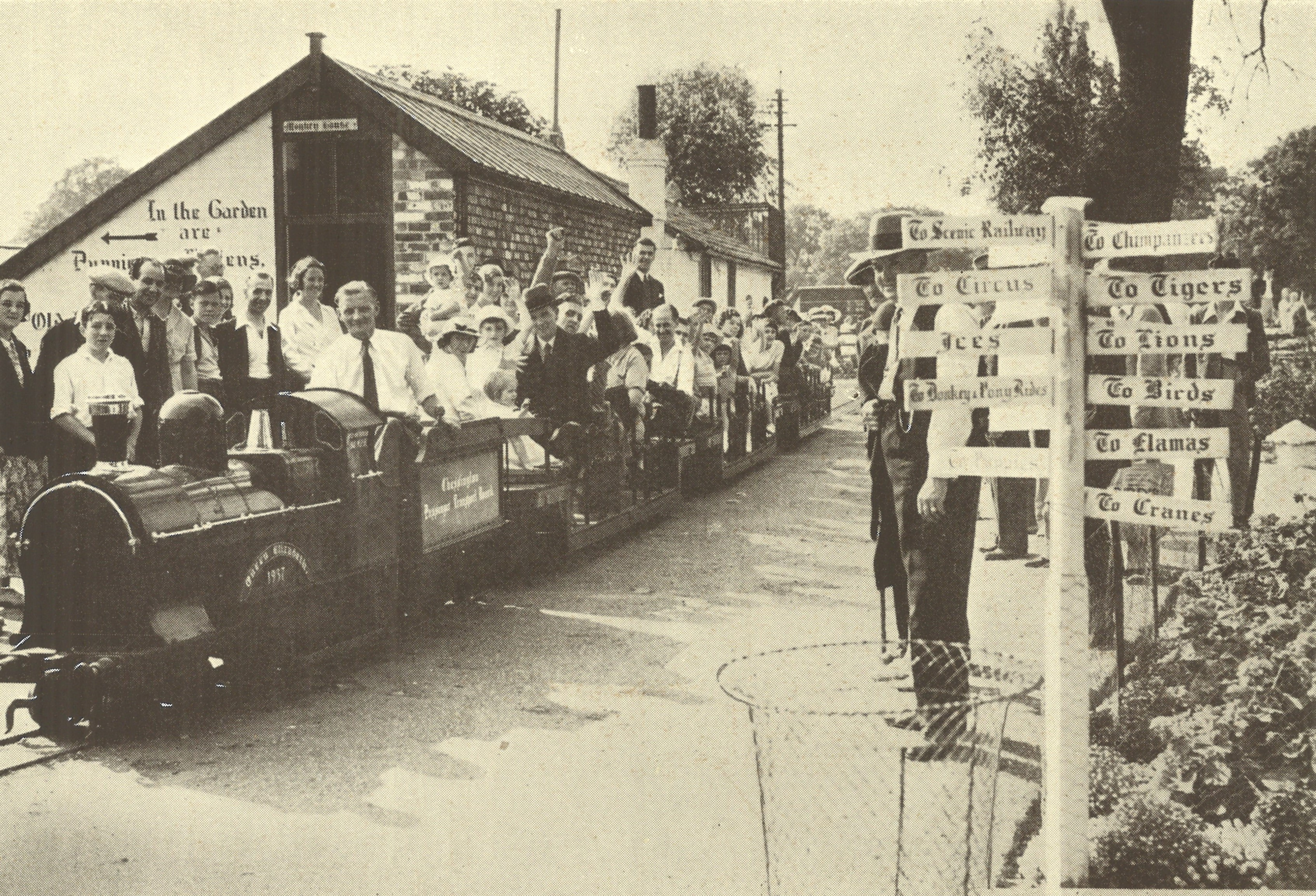
The miniature railway 'Jungle Express' moved from Chessington to Paignton and opening in 1940

In 1939, government restrictions on large public gatherings required the temporary closure of many entertainment venues, including Chessington Zoo. This prompted Goddard to form a partnership with Herbert Whitley, who owned a zoo then called Primley Zoological Gardens (and later to be Paignton Zoo, who agreed to house evacuated animals at Primley. Among the animals transferred were Peggy, daughter of the tigress Beauty and known for appearing in the film Elephant Boy, as well as a home‑bred lioness and her four cubs.

The relocation included not only a large collection of animals, but a miniature railway and entire circus including the clowns and acrobats. Not all of the animals were moved from Chessington, and some remaining in Surrey, a number of which were injured or killed by bombing in 1944.

The zoo at Paignton was re-opened to the public on Saturday 24 August 1940, with a combined collection operating as the Devon Zoo and Circus. Goddard introduced a more entertainment‑focused programme than Whitley had previously favoured, including circus acts and a miniature railway.

In 1946, following the end of the war, Goddard unsuccessfully negotiated with Whitley for a long-term lease on Primley Zoo, and on 3 February 1946 he shut the zoo, leading to a dispute with Whitley. Whitley gained a High Court injunction against Goddard, where Goddard was said to have cancelled arrangements for animal feeding (including not leaving any provision for ration coupons so that Whitley could obtain animal feed) and care of Whitley's remaining animals whilst removing his own back to Surrey. He was also found to be in breach of his tenancy agreement with Whitley for trying to surrender his alcohol license.

Goddard did return with most of his animals to Chessington, though some other attractions remained for several years.

== Death ==
Goddard died of lung cancer in a nursing home in Cambridge on Christmas Day 1946, only a few months after returning his collection to Chessington.

His estate was worth £193,329, of which £20,000 was left to his wife, and £4,000 was to be divided amongst employees at Chessington.
