= Thomas Laidlaw =

Thomas Laidlaw may refer to:

- Thomas Laidlaw (politician) (1813–1876), New South Wales politician
- Thomas Kennedy Laidlaw (1864–1943), Irish racehorse owner
