= 1913 Epsom Derby =

Horse race which took place at Epsom Downs on 4 June 1913

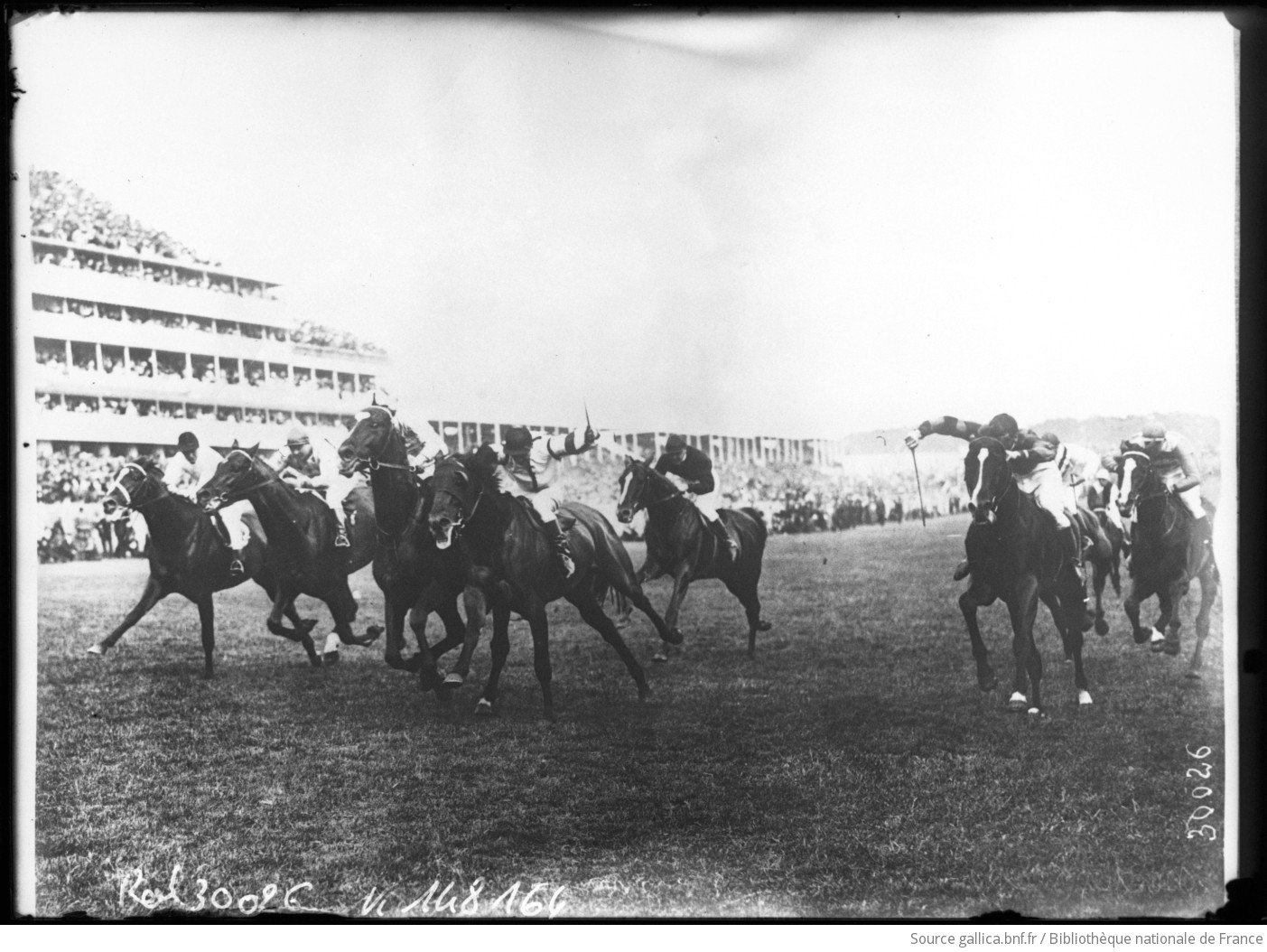
1913 Epsom Derby. Craganour (3rd from left) and Aboyeur (4th from left) get in each other's way.

The 1913 Epsom Derby, sometimes referred to as "The Suffragette Derby", was a horse race which took place at Epsom Downs on 4 June 1913. It was the 134th running of the Derby. The race was won, controversially, by Aboyeur at record 100–1 odds. The winner was ridden by Edwin Piper and trained by Alan Cunliffe.

The race was overshadowed by the death of suffragette Emily Davison, who was killed when she ran out in front of King George V's horse, Anmer. The horse struck Davison as she tried to grab the horse's reins; the injuries she received proved fatal as she died four days later. Davison was a militant suffragette and a member of the Women's Social and Political Union (WSPU), she campaigned throughout her life for votes for women in the United Kingdom.

The race was attended by an estimated 500,000 people, including the King and the Queen.

== Race details ==
Aboyeur, ridden by Edwin Piper, took an early lead which he maintained into the straight, where he ran about three horse-widths away from the inside rail to his left. Several challengers emerged: Craganour challenged the leader on his immediate outside (right), with Nimbus and Great Sport further out, while Shogun, Louvois and Day Comet moved up on the inside. The initial interference occurred when Craganour, ridden by Johnny Reiff, hung left, bumping Aboyeur who in turn veered towards the rail, badly hampering Shogun, Louvois and Day Comet. Piper, then struck his horse with his whip in his left hand, causing Aboyeur to hang sharply back to the centre of the track, colliding with Craganour and attempting to bite him. Throughout the final furlong Reiff, with his whip in his right hand, and Piper, with his whip in his left, continued to drive their horses into each other, leading to repeated bumps as the other horses drew nearer. Craganour crossed the line first in a blanket finish, just ahead of Aboyeur, Day Comet, Louvois, Great Sport and Nimbus, with Shogun, Sun Yat and Bachelor's Wedding finishing just behind.

After a brief pause, the Judge, Mr Robinson announced the result as Craganour first, Aboyeur second, Louvois third, having apparently missed Day Comet on the inside who had been obscured by other runners. The result would not have been official however until the Stewards (senior racecourse officials) announced that everything was "All Right". After a delay, the announcement was made and then immediately withdrawn. It was then announced that an official objection had been lodged against the winner, not by a rival jockey, as was customary, but by the Stewards themselves. After a lengthy inquiry in which the Judge and the jockeys were interviewed, the Stewards disqualified Craganour on the grounds that he had failed to keep a straight course and had thereby "jostled", "bumped and bored" and "interfered" with other runners. The race was awarded to Aboyeur, with Louvois second and Great Sport third.

== Emily Davison ==
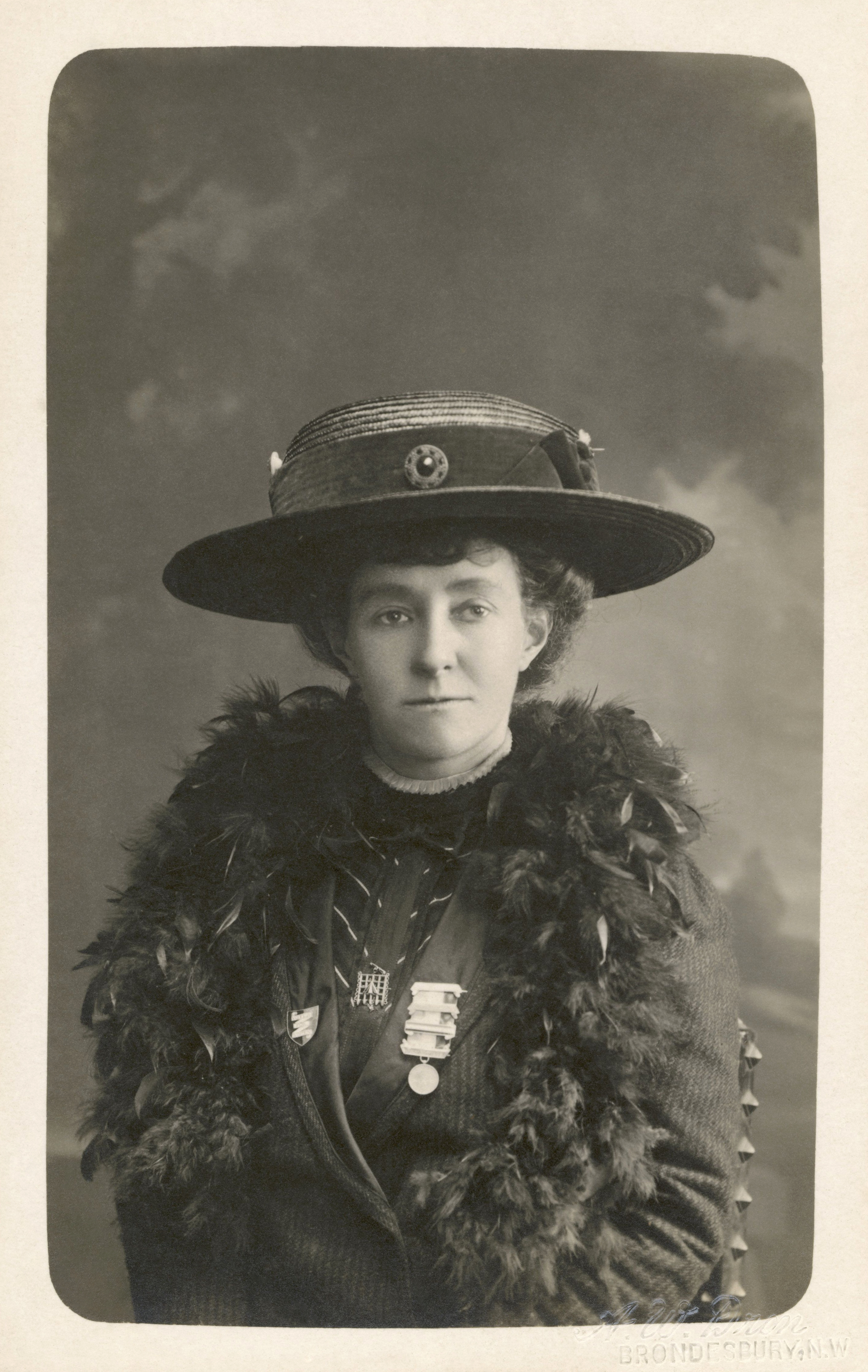
Emily Davison, c. 1910–1912

Davison positioned herself at Tattenham Corner, the bend before the home straight. At this point in the race, with some of the horses having passed her, she ducked under the guard rail and ran onto the course.

She reached up to the reins of Anmer—King George V's horse, ridden by Herbert Jones—and was hit by the animal, which would have been travelling at around 35 miles (56 km) per hour, four seconds after stepping onto the course. Anmer fell in the collision and partly rolled over his jockey, who had his foot momentarily caught in the stirrup. Davison was knocked to the ground; some reports say she was kicked in the head by Anmer, but the surgeon who operated on Davison stated that "I could find no trace of her having been kicked by a horse". The event was captured by three newsreel cameras.

Davison's purpose in attending the Derby and walking onto the course is unclear. She did not discuss her plans with anyone or leave a note. There were some people who believed that Davison was suicidal. This belief is partially based on an incident when Davison had jumped from a prison balcony onto metal stairs and nearly died. Several alternate theories have been suggested, including that she intended to cross the track, believing that all horses had passed; that she wanted to pull down the King's horse; that she was trying to attach one of the WSPU flags to a horse; or that she intended to throw herself in front of one of the horses. Historian Carol Osborne believes it was most likely intended to be a major publicity and political stunt for the women's suffrage movement. Historian June Purvis argues that the incident at the prison was not a suicidal act and should not be used to suggest she was attempting suicide at the derby. At the prison, she was trying to stop the force feeding of other prisoners, and she jumped as a political self-sacrificial act and not an act of suicide. Purvis also mentions how there is evidence that Davison had never planned to end her life at the race. It was discovered that she had a return ticket for the train to go back home which means she probably didn't have any intentions of ending her life at the race. In addition, Purvis mentions how Davison had deep religious beliefs that emphasized sacrifice for a just cause. Davison has expressed this being a possible way to further advance women's suffrage and help the cause.

The WSPU were quick to describe her as a martyr, part of a campaign to identify her as such. The Suffragette newspaper marked Davison's death by issuing a copy showing a female angel with raised arms standing in front of the guard rail of a racecourse. The paper's editorial stated that "Davison has proved that there are in the twentieth-century people who are willing to lay down their lives for an ideal". Biblical phraseology was used in the issue to describe her act, including "Greater love hath no man than this, that he lay down his life for his friends", which Gullickson reports as being repeated several times in subsequent discussions of the events. A year after the Derby, The Suffragette included "The Price of Liberty", an essay by Davison. In it, she had written "To lay down life for friends, that is glorious, selfless, inspiring! But to re-enact the tragedy of Calvary for generations yet unborn, that is the last consummate sacrifice of the Militant".

== Winner's details ==
Further details of the winner, Aboyeur:

- Foaled: 1910
- Sire: Desmond; Dam: Pawky
- Owner: Alan Cunliffe
- Breeder: T. K. Laidlaw

== See also ==
- Suffragette bombing and arson campaign

== Sources ==
- Balding, Clare (26 May 2013). Secrets of a Suffragette (Television production). Channel 4.
- Brown, Jonathan (24 May 2013). "Suffragette Emily Davison: The woman who would not be silenced". The Independent. Archived from the original on 1 May 2022.
- Davison, Emily (5 June 1914). "The Price of Liberty". The Suffragette. p. 129.
- Gullickson, Gay L. (2008). "Emily Wilding Davison: Secular Martyr?". Social Research. 75 (2): 461–484. doi:10.1353/sor.2008.0037. JSTOR 40972072. S2CID 201776722.
- Purvis, June (2013a). "Remembering Emily Wilding Davison (1872–1913)". Women's History Review. 22 (3): 353–362. doi:10.1080/09612025.2013.781405. S2CID 163114123.
- Purvis, June (2013b). "The 1913 Death of Emily Wilding Davison was a Key Moment in the Ongoing Struggle for Gender Equality in the UK". Democratic Audit.
- Tanner, Michael (2013). The Suffragette Derby. London: The Robson Press. ISBN 978-1-8495-4518-1.
- Thorpe, Vanessa (26 May 2013). "Truth Behind the Death of Suffragette Emily Davison is Finally Revealed". The Observer.
- "In Honour and Loving Memory of Emily Wilding Davison". The Suffragette. 13 June 1913. p. 1.
- "The Supreme Sacrifice". The Suffragette. 13 June 1913. pp. 578–579.
