= Epsom Cottage Hospital =

Coordinates: 51.3419°N 0.3013°W

- CSH Surrey
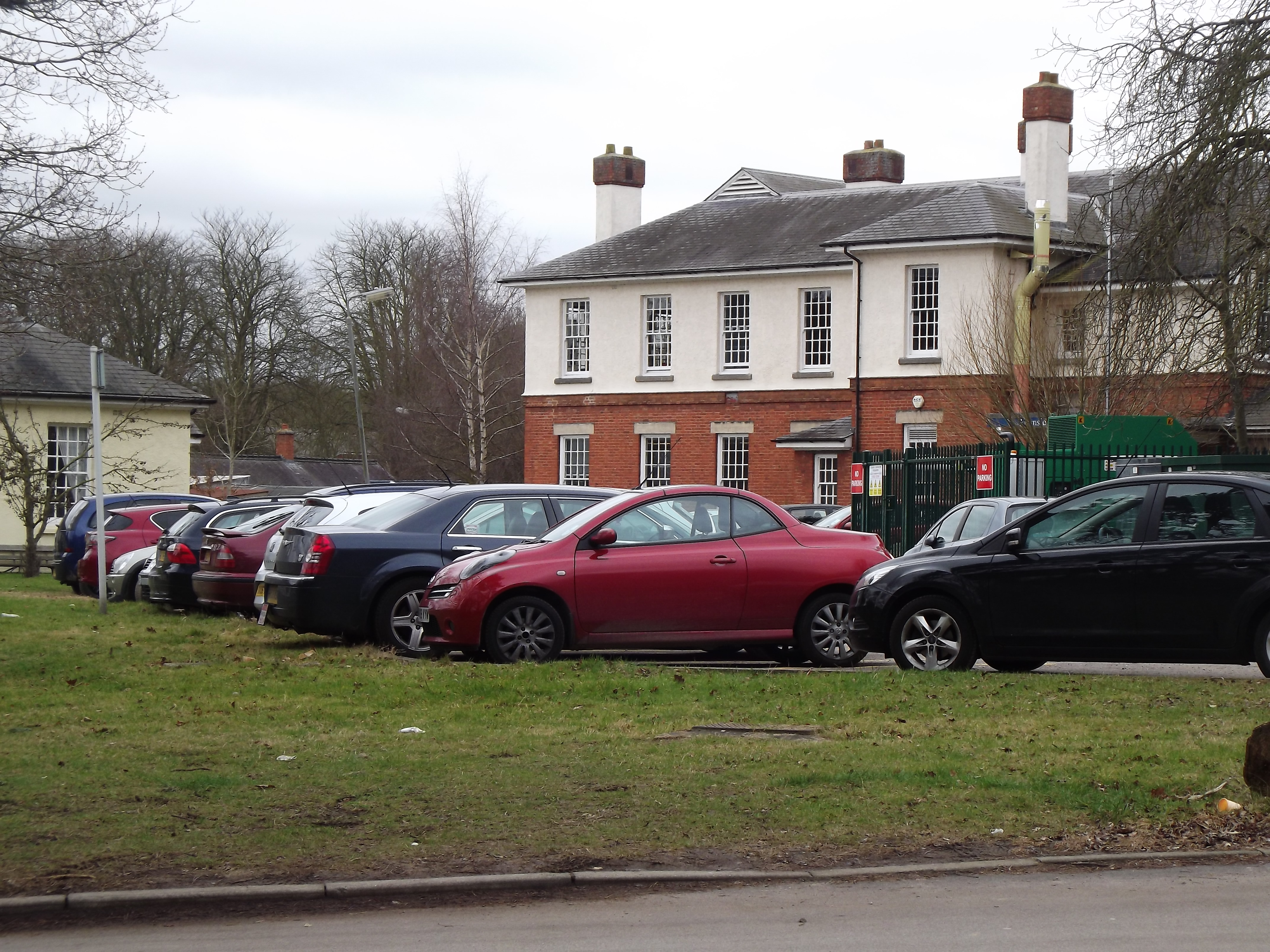
- Epsom Cottage Hospital

- Shown in Surrey

Geography
- Location: West Park Road, Horton Lane, Epsom, Surrey, England

Organisation
- Care system: National Health Service
- Type: General

History
- Founded: 1873

Links
- Website: www.cshsurrey.co.uk
- Lists: Hospitals in England

Epsom and Ewell Cottage Hospital is a small hospital in West Park Road, Horton Lane, Epsom, Surrey. It is managed by CSH Surrey.

== History ==
The hospital has its origins in a facility established at Pembroke Cottages at Pikes Hill in April 1873. It moved to Hawthorn Place in 1877 and to Alexandra Road in 1889. Emily Davison died at the hospital after being hit by King George V's horse Anmer at the 1913 Derby when she walked onto the track during the race.

The hospital joined the National Health Service in 1948. Although the hospital officially closed in 1988, the facility is still used for the physiotherapy and rehabilitation.

== Notable Staff ==
- Susie Dunham, (1861-1917) Matron - July 1903 until her death in 1917. Dunham trained at The London Hospital under Eva Luckes between 1891 and 1893, and worked there as a Staff Nurse until 1901.

== Sources ==
- Morley, Ann; Stanley, Liz (1988). The Life and Death of Emily Wilding Davison. London: The Women's Press. ISBN 978-0-7043-4133-3.
- Tanner, Michael (2013). The Suffragette Derby. London: The Robson Press. ISBN 978-1-8495-4518-1.
