= Thomas Kennedy Laidlaw =

Racehorse owner and breeder

The Right Honourable Thomas Kennedy Laidlaw
- Born: 8 November 1864; Scotland
- Died: 9 September 1943 (aged 78)
- Occupation(s): Racehorse owner and breeder

Thomas Kennedy Laidlaw PC (Ire) (8 November 1864 – 9 September 1943) was a Scottish-born Irish racehorse owner and breeder.

Laidlaw was educated at Park School and the University of Glasgow, but later moved to Ireland. His racing colours were black with gold spots. He bred Aboyeur, winner of the 1913 Epsom Derby, and Gregalach and Grakle, winners of the Grand National in 1929 and 1931 respectively, although he did not own any of them at the time of their wins. He was also High Sheriff of County Dublin in 1919, and appointed to the Privy Council of Ireland in the 1922 New Year Honours, entitling him to the style "The Right Honourable".
