= Fran Abrams =

British investigative journalist and author

- Born: 1963 (age 61–62); Cheshire, England
- Occupation(s): British investigative journalist for BBC Radio 4, and non-fiction author

Frances Gillian Abrams (born 1963) is a British investigative journalist for BBC Radio 4, and a non-fiction author. Earlier in her career she was a journalist for The Independent.

== Early life and education ==
Abrams was born and brought up in Stockport, where she attended Marple Hall County High School. She studied sociology at the University of York and then took a one-year course in journalism in Sheffield.

== Career ==
Her first job in journalism was with the Birmingham Post and Mail group where she first reported on education, going on to be education correspondent for The Sunday Times, The Sunday Correspondent, The Sunday Telegraph and lastly The Independent, where she later switched to reporting on national politics.

Abrams left The Independent in 2000, when she made investigative programmes for BBC Radio 4's File on 4 and written features for The Guardian.

== Personal life ==
Abrams lives in Snape, Suffolk where she runs a small chocolate making business using honey from the bees which she keeps.

== Publications ==
- Below the Breadline: Living on the Minimum Wage, 18 July 2002, Profile Books, ISBN 186197471X
- Freedom's Cause: Lives of the Suffragettes, 2003, Profile Books, ISBN 9781861974259
- Seven Kings: How it Feels to be a Teenager, 14 September 2006, Atlantic Books, ISBN 1843544458
- Learning to Fail: How Society Lets Young People Down, 2010, Routledge, ISBN 0203864824
- Songs of Innocence: The Story of British Childhood, 1 November 2012, Atlantic Books, ISBN 1843548968
