= Carolyn Collette =

American academic

- Occupation: Professor
- Writing career
- Genre: Medieval literature
- Notable works: Species, Phantasms and Images: Vision and Medieval Psychology in the Canterbury Tales

Carolyn P. Collette is an American literary critic and a specialist in medieval literature, particularly Geoffrey Chaucer's The Canterbury Tales. She was Professor Emerita of English Language and Literature at Mount Holyoke College between 1969 and 2013 and is a research associate at the Centre for Medieval Studies at the University of York, in England.

== Background ==
Collette received her B.A. from Mount Holyoke College in 1967 and Ph.D. from the University of Massachusetts Amherst.

== Select bibliography ==
=== Books ===
- Species, Phantasms and Images: Vision and Medieval Psychology in the Canterbury Tales. Ann Arbor: University of Michigan Press, 2001.
- Finding Common Ground: A Guide to Personal, Professional and Public Writing, with Richard Johnson, 2nd ed. (New York: Addison Wesley Longman), 1997.

=== Articles ===
- "A Closer Look at Seinte Cecile's Special Vision," The Chaucer Review, 10, 1976, 337–49.
- "Sense and Sensibility in The Prioress' Tale," The Chaucer Review, 15, 1981, 138–150.
- "Ubi Peccaverant, Ibi Punirentur: The Oak Tree and The Pardoner's Tale," The Chaucer Review, 19, 1985, 39–45.
- "Umberto Eco, Semiotics and The Merchant's Tale," The Chaucer Review, 24, 1989, 132–38.
- "Chaucer and Victorian Medievalism: Culture and Society," Poetica: An International Journal of Linguistic-Literary Studies, Vol. 29–30, 1989, 115–125.
- "Chaucer's Discourse of Mariology," in Art and Context in Late Medieval English Narrative, ed. Robert Edwards, by D.S. Brewer, 1994, 127–147.
- "Heeding the Counsel of Prudence: A Context for the Melibee," The Chaucer Review, 29, 1995, 416–433.
