= Beauclerc =

Hamlet in Northumberland, England

Coordinates: 54.948°N 1.994°W

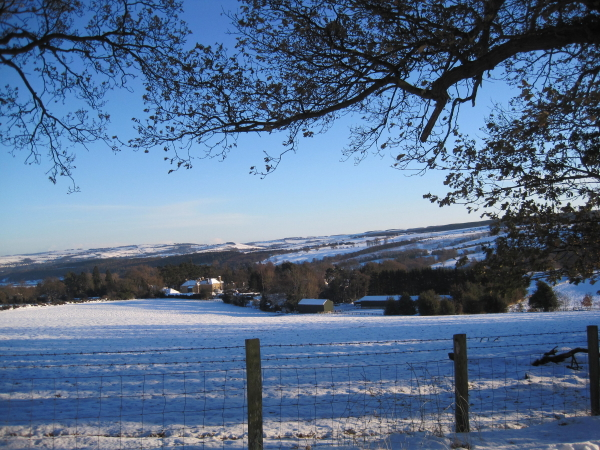
- View towards Beauclerc (December 2010)

- Location within Northumberland
- OS grid reference: NZ005615
- Unitary authority: Northumberland
- Ceremonial county: Northumberland
- Region: North East
- Country: England
- Sovereign state: United Kingdom
- Post town: RIDING MILL
- Postcode district: NE44
- Police: Northumbria
- Fire: Northumberland
- Ambulance: North East
- UK Parliament: Hexham

Beauclerc is a hamlet in Northumberland, England. It is situated to the west of Riding Mill, between Hexham and Newcastle upon Tyne.

== Governance ==
Beauclerc is in the parliamentary constituency of Hexham.
