= Aboyeur =

British Thoroughbred racehorse

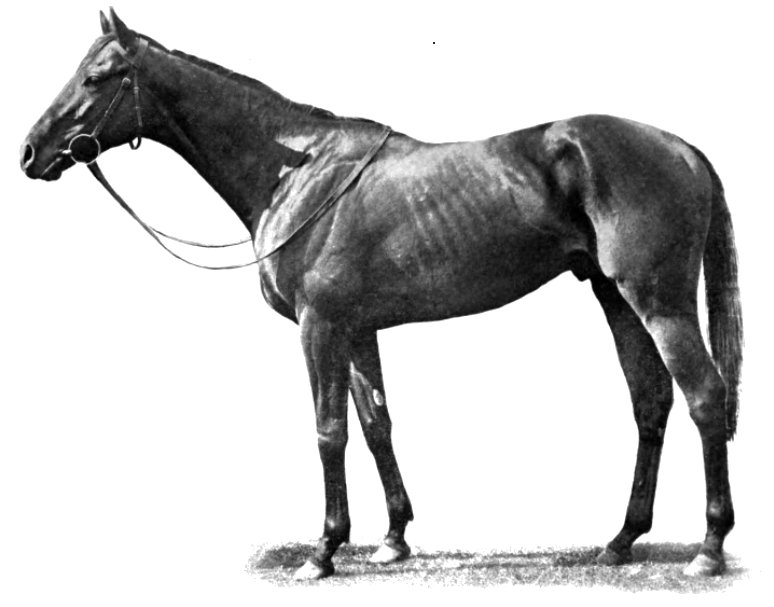
- Aboyeur in 1913.
- Sire: Desmond
- Grandsire: St. Simon
- Dam: Pawky
- Damsire: Morion
- Sex: Stallion
- Foaled: 1910
- Country: Ireland
- Colour: Bay
- Breeder: T. K. Laidlaw
- Owner: Alan Cunliffe
- Trainer: Tom Lewis
- Record: 7: 2-0-0

Major wins
- Epsom Derby (1913)

Aboyeur (1910–circa 1917) was a British Thoroughbred racehorse and sire. In a career that lasted from 1912 to 1913 he ran seven times and won two races. In June 1913 Aboyeur won The Derby at record odds of 100/1. He was awarded the race on the disqualification of Craganour after a rough and controversial race. At the end of the season he was sold and exported to Russia where he disappeared during the Revolution.

== Background ==
Aboyeur was a fine-looking bay horse bred in Ireland by Thomas Kennedy Laidlaw. His sire Desmond was a good racehorse who won the Coventry Stakes and the July Stakes in 1898 and went on to become a successful stallion, earning the title of Champion sire in 1913. Aboyeur's dam, a mare called Pawky, was unraced.

As a foal, Aboyeur was sold by his breeder to J. Daly, who sold him a year later for £2,200 as part of a group of three yearlings to Alan Cunliffe, the leader of a group of heavy gamblers known as the Druid’s Lodge confederacy. The name came from the Druid's Lodge stable near Salisbury, Wiltshire, where their horses, including Aboyeur, were trained in conditions of secrecy by Tom Lewis. The name "Aboyeur" derives from a French word meaning "barker" or "heckler"; it can also refer to a person in a kitchen who shouts out orders. The member of the gambling confederacy who provided most of the financing was Wilfred Bagwell Purefoy.

== Racing career ==
=== 1912: two-year-old season ===
Aboyeur ran three times as a two-year-old in 1912. He showed some promise when winning the Champagne Stakes at Salisbury but finished unplaced in his other two races including the Free Handicap at Newmarket in October in which he finished behind the future 1000 Guineas winner Jest

=== 1913: three-year-old season ===
==== Before Epsom ====
On his three-year-old debut, Aboyeur finished unplaced in a race at Kempton at Easter on his only start before the Derby. The best colt of the season appeared to be Charles Bower Ismay’s Craganour, who had been champion two-year-old in 1912. In a controversial race for the 2000 Guineas he had been awarded second place behind Louvois by the racecourse judge (there were no photo-finish cameras in use), despite many observers believing that he had crossed the line in front.

==== 1913 Derby: the race ====
At Epsom on 4 June, Aboyeur, running in blinkers, was an unconsidered outsider, starting at odds of 100/1 while Craganour was made 6/4 favourite in a field of fifteen. The weather was fine and the record crowd, estimated at up to 500,000 included the King and Queen. Aboyeur was saddled separately, well away from the other horses, and did not take part in any parade before the start. Accounts of the race are often highly coloured and partisan: what follows is an attempt to summarise the evidence. Aboyeur, ridden by Edwin Piper, took an early lead which he maintained into the straight, where he ran about three horse-widths away from the inside rail to his left. Several challengers emerged: Craganour challenged the leader on his immediate outside (right), with Nimbus and Great Sport further out, while Shogun, Louvois and Day Comet moved up on the inside. The initial interference occurred when Craganour, ridden by Johnny Reiff, hung left, bumping Aboyeur who in turn veered towards the rail, badly hampering Shogun, Louvois and Day Comet. Piper, then struck his horse with his whip in his left hand, causing Aboyeur to hang sharply back to the centre of the track, colliding with Craganour and attempting to bite him. Throughout the final furlong Reiff, with his whip in his right hand, and Piper, with his whip in his left, continued to drive their horses into each other, leading to repeated bumps as the other horses drew nearer. Craganour crossed the line first in a blanket finish, just ahead of Aboyeur, Day Comet, Louvois, Great Sport and Nimbus, with Shogun, Sun Yat and Bachelor's Wedding finishing just behind.

==== 1913 Derby: Emily Davison ====
The most famous incident in the race did not involve Aboyeur. After the leaders had passed Tattenham Corner, Emily Davison, a prominent campaigner for women’s suffrage walked out onto the track and was struck by the King’s horse Anmer, who was among the back-markers. Davison suffered fatal injuries as a result.

==== 1913 Derby: the objection ====
After a brief pause, the Judge, Mr Robinson announced the result as Craganour first, Aboyeur second, Louvois third, having apparently missed Day Comet on the inside who had been obscured by other runners. The result would not have been official however until the Stewards (senior racecourse officials) announced that everything was “All Right”. After a delay, the announcement was made and then immediately withdrawn. It was then announced that an official objection had been lodged against the winner, not by a rival jockey, as was customary, but by the Stewards themselves. After a lengthy inquiry in which the Judge and the jockeys were interviewed, the Stewards disqualified Craganour on the grounds that he had failed to keep a straight course and had thereby “jostled”, “bumped and bored” and “interfered” with other runners. The race was awarded to Aboyeur, with Louvois second and Great Sport third.

==== After the Derby ====
Legal challenges to the outcome of the race were made in Chancery Court, but proved unsuccessful, while bookmakers complained that the confusion after the race led to them paying out on both "winners". Aboyeur failed to reproduce his Derby form in his two remaining starts. On 23 July he finished third to Aghdoe and Night Hawk in the St George Stakes at Liverpool and was beaten again in the Gordon Stakes at Goodwood shortly afterwards. At the end of August he was sold for 13,000 guineas to the Imperial Russian Racing Club of St Petersburg and exported to stand as a stallion in Russia at the end of the season.

== Assessment ==
In their book A Century of Champions, John Randall and Tony Morris rated Aboyeur a “poor” Derby winner. More specifically, they rated him equal with Spion Kop as one of the two worst colts to have won the race in the 20th Century.

== Stud career ==
Aboyeur had little opportunity of making a mark at stud. After two seasons in Russia he disappeared during the upheavals of the Russian Revolution and Civil War. Reports that he had been "rescued from the Bolsheviks" and taken to Constantinople proved unfounded and later rumours that he had been evacuated to Serbia disguised as a cart horse were never substantiated. His final fate is unknown.

== Pedigree ==
Pedigree of Aboyeur (GB), bay stallion, 1910
Sire Desmond (GB) 1896	St Simon; 1881	Galopin	Vedette
Sire Desmond (GB) 1896	St Simon; 1881	Galopin	Flying Duchess
Sire Desmond (GB) 1896	St Simon; 1881	St Angela	King Tom
Sire Desmond (GB) 1896	St Simon; 1881	St Angela	Adeline
Sire Desmond (GB) 1896	L'Abbesse de Jouarre; 1886	Trappist	Hermit
Sire Desmond (GB) 1896	L'Abbesse de Jouarre; 1886	Trappist	Bunch
Sire Desmond (GB) 1896	L'Abbesse de Jouarre; 1886	Festive	Carnival
Sire Desmond (GB) 1896	L'Abbesse de Jouarre; 1886	Festive	Piercy
Dam Pawky (GB) 1903	Morion; 1887	Barcaldine	Solon
Dam Pawky (GB) 1903	Morion; 1887	Barcaldine	Ballyroe
Dam Pawky (GB) 1903	Morion; 1887	Chaplet	Beadsman*^
Dam Pawky (GB) 1903	Morion; 1887	Chaplet	Madame Eglentine*^
Dam Pawky (GB) 1903	Clever Girl; 1890	Beauclerc	Rosicrucian^
Dam Pawky (GB) 1903	Clever Girl; 1890	Beauclerc	Bonny Bell
Dam Pawky (GB) 1903	Clever Girl; 1890	Lass o’Gowrie	Blair Athol
Dam Pawky (GB) 1903	Clever Girl; 1890	Lass o’Gowrie	Queens Head (Family: 1-b)

* Aboyeur is inbred 4D x 5D to the stallion Beadsman, meaning that he appears fourth generation and fifth generation (via Rosicrucian)^ on the dam side of his pedigree.

* Aboyeur is inbred 4D x 5D to the mare Madame Eglentine, meaning that she appears fourth generation and fifth generation (via Rosicrucian)^ on the dam side of his pedigree.
