= Pasch (horse) =

British-bred Thoroughbred racehorse

- Sire: Blandford
- Grandsire: Swynford
- Dam: Pasca
- Damsire: Manna
- Sex: Stallion
- Foaled: 1935
- Country: United Kingdom
- Colour: Bay
- Breeder: Henry Morriss
- Owner: Henry Morriss
- Trainer: Fred Darling
- Record: 6:3-1-2

Major wins
- 2000 Guineas (1938); Eclipse Stakes (1938)

Pasch (1935–1939) was a British Thoroughbred racehorse and sire, best known for winning the classic 2000 Guineas in 1938, a year in which he started favourite for all three legs of the Triple Crown. In a brief racing career which lasted from April to October of his three-year-old season, he ran six times, recording three wins, one second, and two third places. Apart from his win in the Guineas, he won the Eclipse Stakes and was placed in The Derby, St Leger Stakes and Champion Stakes. He was then retired to stud but died after siring a single crop of foals.

== Background ==
Pasch was a bay horse with a narrow white blaze and one white foot bred his owner Henry E. Morriss, a Shanghai-based bullion broker. He was sired by Blandford, a highly successful breeding stallion whose other notable winners included Bahram, Windsor Lad, Blenheim, Trigo and Brantôme. Pasch's dam Pasca was a daughter of Morriss's Derby winner Manna out of the mare Soubriquet, a half-sister of Fifinella. Soubriquet was a high class runner in her own right, winning five races and finishing second in both the 1000 Guineas and The Oaks. At the end of her racing career she was bought by Morriss for 12,500 guineas to become a broodmare. Pasca won two minor races and also produced Pasqua, the dam of the Derby winner Pinza.

Morriss sent the colt into training with Fred Darling at his stable at Beckhampton in Wiltshire. At Darling's stable, Pasch was lodged in the box which had previously been occupied by the Derby winners Coronach and Manna.

== Racing career ==
=== 1938: three-year-old season ===
Pasch was unraced as a two-year-old after sustaining an injury to his pastern in the spring. Although he recovered by autumn it was decided not to race him until the following year. He was highly regarded by his owner who described him in November 1937 as a colt who might "be heard of next year in the classic races, as he is very good".

In 1938 he began his racing career by winning the Coventry Stakes at Kempton Park Racecourse on 16 April. He was then stepped up in class to contest the 2000 Guineas over the Rowley Mile course at Newmarket eleven days later. Despite his lack of experience and an unfavourable draw, the colt was strongly supported in the betting and started the 5/2 favourite in a field of eighteen runners. Pasch started quickly and led in the early stages before being settled by the champion jockey Gordon Richards. He regained the lead at half way and despite showing his inexperience by "looking round him like a novice" he won by two lengths from Scottish Union and Mirza. Richards said that the colt had won with at least seven pounds in hand, adding "I really cannot see what can beat him in the Derby." It was also noted that the colt's quick, "bouncing" action was ideally suited to the prevailing fast ground. Other observers, however, felt that Pasch's excitable temperament would be a disadvantage in the Epsom classic.

By 1 June, when the Derby was run over 1 1/2 miles at Epsom, the ground had been softened by rain. Although he was racing in more testing conditions than he had previously encountered, Pasch started the 9/4 favourite against twenty-one opponents. He moved up to challenge the leader Scottish Union in the straight and looked likely to win before Bois Roussel, a French colt who had arrived in Darling's stable two weeks before the race, produced a "spectacular finish" to win by four lengths. Pasch lost second place by two lengths to Scottish Union with Richards offering no real excuses, although he did state that the favourite had "hated coming down the hill". Pasch was then brought back in distance and matched against older horses in the Eclipse Stakes over ten furlongs at Sandown. He started at odds of 13/8 and won impressively by three lengths from the four-year-old Fair Copy, with Scottish Union in fourth.

On 7 September, Pasch ran in the St Leger Stakes over 1 mile, 6 1/2 furlongs at Doncaster Racecourse. He started favourite but finished third of the nine runners beaten a neck and four lengths by Scottish Union and Challenge. After the St Leger it was announced that Pasch had been retired but he returned for the Champion Stakes at Newmarket in October. He was expected to end his career with a win but was beaten five lengths by the filly Rockfel.

== Assessment ==
In their book A Century of Champions, based on a modified version of the Timeform system, John Randall and Tony Morris rated Pasch an "average" winner of the 2000 Guineas.

== Stud record ==
Pasch was retired from racing to become a breeding stallion at Morriss's Banstead Manor stud. After completing one season at stud he became ill in September 1939 and died shortly afterwards of meningitis. His foals included a filly named Pasquinade who became a successful broodmare, producing Royal Serenade (Nunthorpe Stakes, Hollywood Gold Cup) and Royal Palm (Nunthorpe Stakes).

== Pedigree ==
Pedigree of Pasch (GB), bay stallion, 1935
Sire Blandford (IRE) 1919	Swynford; 1907	John O'Gaunt	Isinglass
Sire Blandford (IRE) 1919	Swynford; 1907	John O'Gaunt	La Fleche
Sire Blandford (IRE) 1919	Swynford; 1907	Canterbury Pilgrim	Tristan
Sire Blandford (IRE) 1919	Swynford; 1907	Canterbury Pilgrim	Pilgrimage
Sire Blandford (IRE) 1919	Blanche; 1912	White Eagle	Gallinule*
Sire Blandford (IRE) 1919	Blanche; 1912	White Eagle	Merry Gal
Sire Blandford (IRE) 1919	Blanche; 1912	Black Cherry	Bendigo
Sire Blandford (IRE) 1919	Blanche; 1912	Black Cherry	Black Duchess
Dam Pasca (GB) 1928	Manna; 1922	Phalaris	Polymelus*
Dam Pasca (GB) 1928	Manna; 1922	Phalaris	Bromus
Dam Pasca (GB) 1928	Manna; 1922	Waffles	Buckwheat
Dam Pasca (GB) 1928	Manna; 1922	Waffles	Lady Mischief
Dam Pasca (GB) 1928	Soubriquet; 1919	Lemberg	Cyllene*
Dam Pasca (GB) 1928	Soubriquet; 1919	Lemberg	Galicia
Dam Pasca (GB) 1928	Soubriquet; 1919	Silver Fowl	Wildfowler*
Dam Pasca (GB) 1928	Soubriquet; 1919	Silver Fowl	L'Argent (Family: 3-i)

* Pasch is inbred 4S x 5D to the stallion Galinule, meaning that he appears fourth generation on the sire side of his pedigree, and fifth generation (via Wildfowler) on the dam side of his pedigree.

* Pasch is inbred 5D x 4D to the stallion Cyllene, meaning that he appears fifth generation (via Polymelus) and fourth generation on the dam side of his pedigree.
