= Duke of Edinburgh Stakes =

- Class: Handicap
- Location: Ascot Racecourse; Ascot, England
- Inaugurated: 1914 as Bessborough Stakes; 1999 as Duke of Edinburgh Stakes
- Race type: Flat / Thoroughbred
- Website: Ascot

Race information
- Distance: 1m 3f 211yd (2,406 metres)
- Surface: Turf
- Track: Right-handed
- Qualification: Three-years-old and up
- Weight: Handicap
- Purse: £110,000 (2025); 1st: £56,694

Duke Of Edinburgh Handicap
2026
Opportunity	Warrant Holder	Regal Ulixes

Previous years
2025
Ethical Diamond	Mutaawid	Naqeeb
2024
Crystal Black	Epic Poet	Ziggy
2023
Okita Soushi	Hms President	Live Your Dream
2022
Candleford	Ajero	Contact
2021
Quickthorn	Raymond Tusk	Zabeel Champion

2020-2011
2020
Scarlet Dragon	Deja	West End Charmer
2019
Baghdad	Ben Vrackie	Fujaira Prince
2018
Dash Of Spice	Sir Chauvelin	Walton Street
2017
Rare Rhythm	Appeared	Star Storm
2016
Kinema	Elite Army	Kings Fete
2015
Arab Dawn	Ajman Bridge	Astronereus
2014
Arab Spring	Salutation	Havana Cooler
2013
Opinion	Stencive	Ustura
2012
Camborne	Hammerfest	Harrison's Cave
2011
Fox Hunt	Blissful Moment	Averroes

2010-2001
2010
Cill Rialaig	Imposing	Martyr
2009
Drill Sergeant	Record Breaker	Martyr
2008
Sugar Ray	Mad Rush	King Charles
2007
Pevensey	Solent	Hitchcock
2006
Young Mick	Glistening	Palomar
2005
Notable Guest	Crow Wood	Rehearsal
2004
Wunderwood	Pagan Dance	Swift Tango
2003
Waverley	Researched	Hambleden
2002
Thundering Surf	Holy Orders	Counsel's Opinion
2001
Takamaka Bay	Akbar	Gallery God

2000-1991
2000
Katiykha	Gallery God	Veridian
1999
Blueprint	Banbury	Just In Time
1998
Greek Palace	Sabadilla	Winged Hussar
1997
Zaralaska	Kurakka	Soloman
1997
Zaralaska	Nabhaan	Willie Conquer
1996
Tykeyvor	My Learned Friend	At Liberty
1995
Son Of Sharp Shot	Zaralaska	Shadow Leader
1994
Master Charlie	Hasten To Add	Darrery
1993
Source Of Light	Turgenev	Blackpatch Hill
1992
Spinning	Regent's Folly	Matador
1991
Rinja	Local Derby	First Victory

1990-1983
1990
Hateel	First Victory	The Prussian
1989
Stratford Ponds	Butlers Wharf	Firelight Fiesta
1988
Vouchsafe	Rambo Dancer	Stavordale
1987
Primitive Rising	Ebolito	Pubby
1986
Convinced	Russian Noble	Western Dancer
1985
Clanrallier	Lake Valentina	Leadburn
1983
Grand Unit	Aberfield	Spin of a Coin

The Duke of Edinburgh Stakes is a flat Handicap horse race in Great Britain open to horses of three-year-old and up. It is run at Ascot over a distance of 1 mile 3 furlongs and 211 yards (2,406 metres), and it is scheduled to take place each year in June.

The race was previously known as the Bessborough Stakes and was named after John Ponsonby, 5th Earl of Bessborough who was Master of the Buckhounds on three occasions in the 19th century. The first race under the original name was a five furlong race for two-year-olds run at Royal Ascot in 1914. The title was later bestowed on a mile and a half handicap race at the same meeting, with the first running in 1922. In 1999, the race was renamed in honour of Prince Philip, Duke of Edinburgh. The name Duke of Edinburgh Stakes had previously been used for a two-year-old race run at Ascot in autumn whose winners included the future Champion Hurdler Sea Pigeon.

The race has been won by horses who have gone on to win at Group level, including Blueprint (Jockey Club Stakes), Young Mick (Cumberland Lodge Stakes) and Fox Hunt (Deutsches St Leger).

== Winners ==
- Weights given in stones and pounds.

Year	Winner	Age	Weight	Jockey	Trainer	SP	Time
1922	Fred Power	3	7-10	Steve Donoghue	Fred Darling	7/1	2:29.80
1923	East Tor	5	8-02	Frank Bullock	Alec Taylor Jr.	10/1	2:33.00
1924	Haine	3	8-03	Charlie Smirke	C Davis	6/1	2:39.60
1925	Mongoose	5	8-02	Richard Perryman	Robert Sherwood Jr.	9/1	2:30.00
1926	Abbot's Speed	3	7-07	Joseph Marshall	Fred Darling	100/12	2:39.40
1927	Lulworth Cove	4	7-07	Freddie Fox	Richard Gooch	5/1 F	2:31.80
1928	Toureen	4	7-08	Sam Wragg	Robert Colling	20/1	2:35.00
1929	Siegfried	4	7-13	Harry Wragg	Dawson Waugh	100/8	2:32.80
1930	Gentlemen's Relish	4	7-04	Kenneth Robertson	Atty Persse	7/1	2:40.00
1931	Six Wheeler	6	8-00	Billy Nevett	Charles Elsey	20/1	2:35.60
1932	Birthday Book	4	8-04	Bobby Dick	Joseph Lawson	8/1	2:31.80
1933	Rock Star	6	7-11	Cyril Buckham	Major Vanda Beatty	100/7	2:34.80
1934	Flange	8	8-01	Freddie Fox	Cecil Boyd-Rochfort	100/8	2:34.40
1935	Cariff	4	8-10	Billy Nevett	Matthew D Peacock	10/1	2:37.40
1936	Cariff	5	8-12	Billy Nevett	Matthew J Peacock	5/1 F	2:30.60
1937	Gamesmaster	6	7-10	Peter Maher	George Todd	100/6	2:32.60
1938	Spot Barred	4	7-13	Ted Gardner	J Murphy	100/8	2:31.60
1939	Alistair	5	7-08	Eph Smith	Basil Jarvis	100/8	2:44.40
1940–45	No Race
1946	Esquimalt	4	8-06	Gordon Richards	Fred Darling	8/1	2:42.40
1947	Eastern Lyric	4	8-06	Ken Gethin	Harold Wallington	5/1 F	2:35.00
1948	Las Vegas	6	8-05	Charlie Elliott	George Colling	20/1	2:33.40
1949	High Beacon	5	8-01	Billy Cook	Walter Nightingall	100/7	2:33.00
1950	Rumpelstilskin	4	7-06	Willie Snaith	Dick Warden	15/2	2:38.60
1951	Proud Scot	4	7-13	Neil Sellwood	Peter Nelson	100/6	2:31.20
1952	Hoar-Frost	4	7-08	Doug Smith	Albert Richardson	100/7	2:33.20
1953	Sleeping Warrior	4	7-08	Doug Smith	George Colling	100/6	2:40.80
1954	Henri De Navarre	6	7-13	Edgar Britt	Rufus Beasley	20/1	2:38.80
1955	Peter-So-Gay	5	7-01	Peter Robinson	Tom Griffiths	10/1	2:33.40
1956	Blue Blazes	4	8-02	Manny Mercer	Jack Jarvis	20/1	2:34.79
1957	The Tuscar	4	8-04	Scobie Breasley	Gordon Richards	13/2	2:33.35
1958	Huguenot	4	8-04	Manny Mercer	George Colling	7/1	2:30.36
1959	Hyphen	4	8-04	Doug Smith	Jack Watts	5/1	2:34.36
1960	Persian Road	5	8-05	Jimmy Lindley	Jeremy Tree	7/1	2:35.72
1961	Thames Trader	5	9-02	Scobie Breasley	Staff Ingham	100/7	2:36.24
1962	Better Honey	4	8-03	Geoff Littlewood	Buster Fenningworth	10/1	2:34.21
1963	Raccolto	6	8-10	Lester Piggott	Sam Hall	11/4	2:43.70
1964	Linnet Lane	4	8-09	Geoff Lewis	Ian Balding	8/1	2:37.80
1965	Prince Hansel	4	8-12	Garnet Bougoure	Dave Thom	100/8	2:34.82
1966	Twelfth Man	5	8-04	Joe Mercer	Harry Wragg	8/1	2:35.86
1967	Polmak	4	8-05	Lester Piggott	Frank Armstrong	9/2 F	2:34.62
1968	Q.C.	7	8-06	Geoff Lewis	Ted Goddard	7/1	2:33.60
1969	Pharaoh Hophra	5	7-10	Ernie Johnson	Frank Cundell	100/7	2:35.65
1970	Prince Consort	4	9-10	Sandy Barclay	Noel Murless	100/8	2:30.77
1971	Hardbake	4	9-01	Ron Hutchinson	John Dunlop	10/1	2:40.24
1972	Collectors Slip	4	8-07	Geoff Lewis	John Sutcliffe	8/1	2:32.70
1973	Loyal Guard	4	8-12	Pat Eddery	Peter Walwyn	7/1	2:40.40
1974	Anji	5	7-10	Willie Carson	John Sutcliffe	10/1	2:31.83
1975	Fool's Mate	4	8-08	Frankie Durr	Henry Cecil	8/1	2:30.96
1976	Royal Match	5	9-06	Taffy Thomas	Ryan Jarvis	13/2	2:31.80
1977	Peaceful	6	8-13	Steve Raymont	Jeremy Tree	11/1	2:41.34
1978	Billion	4	8-06	Lester Piggott	John Dunlop	13/2	2:30.99
1979	St Briavels	5	8-06	John Reid	Gavin Pritchard-Gordon	10/1	2:31.16
1980	Barley Hill	4	9-10	Tony Murray	Bruce Hobbs	6/1	2:36.05
1981	Russian George	5	8-13	Paul Cook	Gavin Hunter	10/1	2:29.07
1982	Spin of a Coin	4	8-09	Brian Rouse	Ryan Price	9/1	2:31.32
1983	Grand Unit	5	7-09	Alan Mackay	Eric Eldin	9/2 F	2:28.08
1984	Sikorsky	4	7-07	Bill Shoemaker	John Sutcliffe	9/2 F	2:29.03
1985	Clanrallier	5	7-07	Lindsay Charnock	Bill Watts	8/1	2:29.94
1986	Vouchsafe	4	8-06	Willie Carson	Guy Harwood	9/1	2:30.69
1987	Primitive Rising	3	8-05	Willie Ryan	Henry Cecil	7/2 F	2:37.45
1988	Vouchsafe	6	7-13	Willie Carson	Neil Graham	12/1	2:32.70
1989	Stratford Ponds	4	8-01	Pat Eddery	John Dunlop	10/1	2:29.32
1990	Hateel	4	9-00	Willie Carson	Peter Walwyn	5/1 F	2:29.65
1991	Rinja	4	7-09	John Lowe	David Arbuthnot	16/1	2:32.18
1992	Spinning	5	9-03	Ray Cochrane	Ian Balding	25/1	2:27.82
1993	Source of Light	4	9-03	Pat Eddery	Roger Charlton	11/1	2:39.62
1994	Master Charlie	4	9-02	Frankie Dettori	Ian Balding	10/1	2:28.48
1995	Son of Sharp Shot	5	8-13	Pat Eddery	John Dunlop	5/1	2:28.71
1996	Tykeyvor	6	8-01	Fergal Lynch	Lady Herries	14/1	2:29.88
1997	Zaralaska	6	8-13	Pat Eddery	Luca Cumani	8/1	2:31.76
1998	Greek Palace	4	9-08	Walter Swinburn	Sir Michael Stoute	9/1	2:35.56
1999	Blueprint	4	9-09	Gary Stevens	Sir Michael Stoute	4/1	2:28.60
2000	Katiykha	4	9-09	Johnny Murtagh	John Oxx	10/1	2:31.68
2001	Takamaka Bay	4	9-00	Darryll Holland	Mark Johnston	10/1	2:30.58
2002	Thundering Surf	5	9-00	Richard Hughes	John Jenkins	11/1	2:31.79
2003	Waverley	4	9-00	Jimmy Fortune	Hughie Morrison	14/1	2:30.76
2004	Wunderwood	5	9-01	Seb Sanders	Lady Herries	15/2	2:28.74
2005	Notable Guest	4	9-08	Michael Kinane	Sir Michael Stoute	4/1	2:28.01
2006	Young Mick	4	8-08	Richard Quinn	George Margarson	28/1	2:29.97
2007	Pevensey	5	8-10	Graham Gibbons	John Quinn	8/1	2:36.64
2008	Sugar Ray	4	9-00	Ryan Moore	Sir Michael Stoute	8/1	2:32.95
2009	Drill Sergeant	4	9-07	Joe Fanning	Mark Johnston	14/1	2:29.70
2010	Cill Rialaig	5	8-11	Steve Drowne	Hughie Morrison	16/1	2:29.64
2011	Fox Hunt	4	9-08	Silvestre de Sousa	Mark Johnston	12/1	2:40.03
2012	Camborne	4	9-04	William Buick	John Gosden	11/2	2:31.47
2013	Opinion	4	9-00	Ryan Moore	Sir Michael Stoute	8/1	2:31.30
2014	Arab Spring	4	9-10	Ryan Moore	Sir Michael Stoute	11/4F	2:28.85
2015	Arab Dawn	4	9-02	Richard Hughes	Hughie Morrison	6/1	2:28.12
2016	Kinema	5	9-04	Fran Berry	Ralph Beckett	8/1	2:32.59
2017	Rare Rhythm	5	9-02	William Buick	Charlie Appleby	20/1	2:31.15
2018	Dash of Spice	4	9-03	Silvestre de Sousa	David Elsworth	7/2 F	2:27.76
2019	Baghdad	4	9-08	Ryan Moore	Mark Johnston	7/2 F	2:30.57
2020	Scarlet Dragon	7	9-02	Hollie Doyle	Alan King	33/1	2:35.40
2021	Quickthorn	4	9-03	Oisin Murphy	Hughie Morrison	7/2	2:41.80
2022	Candleford	4	8-12	Tom Marquand	William Haggas	11/2	2:28.72
2023	Okita Soushi	5	9-09	Ryan Moore	Joseph O'Brien	9/1	2:30.49
2024	Crystal Black	6	9-10	Colin Keane	Gerard Keane	11/1	2:30.56
2025	Ethical Diamond	5	9-03	Ryan Moore	Willie Mullins	3/1 F	2:29.79
2026	Opportunity	4	9-07	James McDonald	William Haggas	6/1	2:28.54

== See also ==
- Horse racing in Great Britain
- List of British flat horse races
