= St James's Palace Stakes =

Flat horse race in Britain

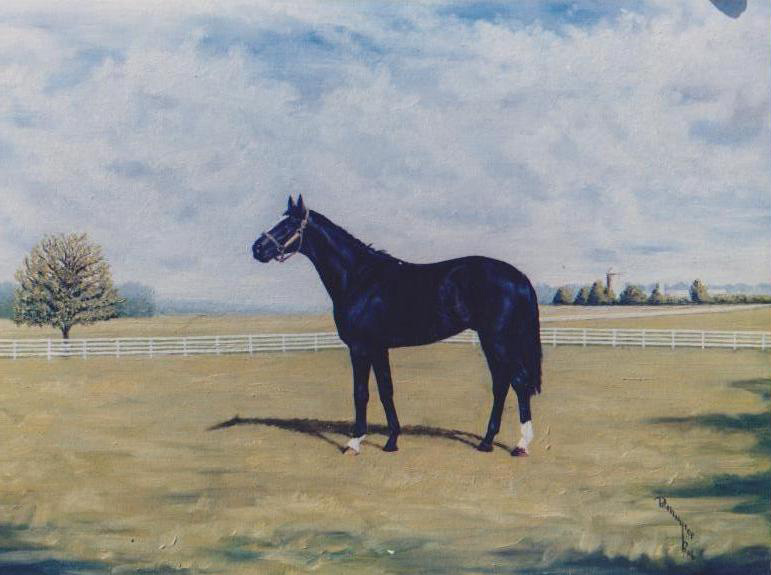
- Chief Singer, painted by Bob Demuyser oil on canvas
- Class: Group 1
- Location: Ascot Racecourse; Ascot, England
- Inaugurated: 1834
- Race type: Flat / Thoroughbred
- Website: Ascot

Race information
- Distance: 7f 213yd (1,603 metres)
- Surface: Turf
- Track: Right-handed
- Qualification: Three-year-old colts
- Weight: 9 st 2 lb
- Purse: £650,000 (2025); 1st: £368,615

St James's Palace Stakes
2026
| Bow Echo | Gstaad | Talk of New York |

Previous years
2025
Field Of Gold | Henri Matisse | Ruling Court
2024
Rosallion | Henry Longfellow | Metropolitan
2023
Paddington | Chaldean | Charyn
2022
Coroebus | Lusail | My Prospero
2021
Poetic Flare | Lucky Vega | Battleground

2020-2011
2020
Palace Pier | Pinatubo | Wichita
2019
Circus Maximus | King Of Comedy | Too Darn Hot
2018
Without Parole | Gustav Klimt | Wootton
2017
Barney Roy | Lancaster Bomber | Thunder Snow
2016
Galileo Gold | The Gurkha | Awtaad
2015
Gleneagles | Latharnach | Consort
2014
Kingman | Night Of Thunder | Outstrip
2013
Dawn Approach | Toronado | Mars
2012
Most Improved | Hermival | Gregorian
2011
Frankel | Zoffany | Excelebration

2010-2001
2010
Canford Cliffs | Dick Turpin | Hearts Of Fire
2009
Mastercraftsman | Delegator | Lord Shanakill
2008
Henrythenavigator | Raven's Pass | Twice Over
2007
Excellent Art | Duke Of Marmalade | Astronomer Royal
2006
Araafa | Stormy River | Ivan Denisovich
2005
Shamardal | Ad Valorem | Oratorio
2004
Azamour | Diamond Green | Antonius Pius
2003
Zafeen | Kalaman | Martillo
2002
Rock Of Gibraltar | Landseer | Aramram
2001
Black Minnaloushe | Noverre | Olden Times

2000-1991
2000
Giant's Causeway | Valentino | Medicean
1999
Sendawar | Aljabr | Gold Academy
1998
Dr Fong | Desert Prince | Duck Row
1997
Starborough | Air Express | Daylami
1996
Bijou d'Inde | Ashkalani | Sorbie Tower
1995
Bahri | Charnwood Forest | Vettori
1994
Grand Lodge | Distant View | Turtle Island
1993
Kingmambo | Needle Gun | Ventiquattrofogli
1992
Brief Truce | Zaahi | Ezzoud
1991
Marju | Second Set | Hokusai

1990-1988
1990
Shavian | Rock City | Lord Florey
1989
Shaadi | Greensmith | Scenic
1988
Persian Heights | Raykour | Caerwent

The St James's Palace Stakes is a Group 1 flat horse race in Great Britain open to three-year-old colts. It is run at Ascot over a distance of 7 furlongs and 213 yards (1,603 metres). It is scheduled to be run each year in June.

== History ==
The event is named after St James's Palace, a royal residence during the Tudor period. It was established in 1834, and the inaugural race was a walkover.

The present system of race grading was introduced in 1971, and for a period, the St James's Palace Stakes was classed at Group 2 level. It was promoted to Group 1 status in 1988.

The St James's Palace Stakes usually features horses which ran previously in the 2,000 Guineas, the Poule d'Essai des Poulains or the Irish 2,000 Guineas. It is contested on the opening day of the Royal Ascot meeting.

== Records ==
Leading jockey (6 wins):

- Michael Kinane – Dara Monarch (1982), Brief Truce (1992), Grand Lodge (1994), Giant's Causeway (2000), Rock of Gibraltar (2002), Azamour (2004)

Leading trainer (9 wins):

- Aidan O'Brien – Giant's Causeway (2000), Black Minnaloushe (2001), Rock of Gibraltar (2002), Excellent Art (2007), Henrythenavigator (2008), Mastercraftsman (2009), Gleneagles (2015), Circus Maximus (2019), Paddington (2023)

Leading owner (9 wins): (includes part ownership)

- Sue Magnier – Giant's Causeway (2000), Black Minnaloushe (2001), Rock of Gibraltar (2002), Excellent Art (2007), Henrythenavigator (2008), Mastercraftsman (2009), Gleneagles (2015), Circus Maximus (2019), Paddington (2023)

== Winners since 1900 ==
| Year | Winner | Jockey | Trainer | Owner | Time |
|---|---|---|---|---|---|
| 1900 | Bonarose | Lester Reiff | Frederick William Day | Ernest Cassel |
| 1901 | Lauzun | Morny Cannon | Richard Marsh | Duke of Devonshire |
| 1902 | Sceptre | Frank Hardy | Robert Sievier | Robert Sievier | 1:48.00 |
| 1903 | Rock Sand | Danny Maher | George Blackwell | James Miller |
| 1904 | Challenger | William Lane | Sam Darling | L Robinson |
| 1905 | Cherry Lass | Herbert Jones | Jack Robinson | William Hall-Walker |
| 1906 | Black Arrow | Barry Lynham | Jack Robinson | William Hall-Walker |
| 1907 | Slieve Gallion | Billy Higgs | Sam Darling | Henry Greer |
| 1908 | Your Majesty | Walter Griggs | Charles Morton | Jack Barnato Joel |
| 1909 | Minoru | Herbert Jones | Richard Marsh | King Edward VII |
| 1910 | Lemberg | Danny Maher | Alec Taylor Jr. | Alfred W. Cox |
| 1911 | Stedfast | Frank Wootton | George Lambton | Lord Derby |
| 1912 | Tracery | Danny Maher | John Watson | August Belmont Jr. |
| 1913 | Roseworthy | Danny Maher | Atty Persse | A F Bassett | 1:42.80 |
| 1914 | Carrickfergus | Jim Clark | Jack Robinson | William Hall-Walker |
| 1915-18 | No race |
| 1919 | Grand Parade | Arthur Smith | Frank Barling | Lord Glanely |
| 1920 | Allenby | Fred Slade | Percy Linton | Walter Raphael |
| 1921 | Craig an Eran | Frank Bullock | Alec Taylor Jr. | Lord Astor | 1:42.60 |
| 1922 | Captain Cuttle | Steve Donoghue | Fred Darling | Lord Woolavington | 1:41.40 |
| 1923 | Ellangowan | Charlie Elliott | Jack Jarvis | Lord Rosebery | 1:42.40 |
| 1924 | Tom Pinch | George Archibald | Fred Darling | Lord Woolavington | 1:43.40 |
| 1925 | Zambo | Brownie Carslake | Dick Dawson | Aga Khan III | 1:34.80 |
| 1926 | Coronach | Joe Childs | Fred Darling | Lord Woolavington | 1:50.40 |
| 1927 | Kincardine | Harry Beasley | Atty Persse | A Barclay | 1:44.80 |
| 1928 | Royal Minstrel | Joe Childs | Cecil Boyd-Rochfort | G P Gough | 1:46.80 |
| 1929 | Mr Jinks | Harry Beasley | Atty Persse | Dermot McCalmont | 1:44.60 |
| 1930 | Christopher Robin | Rufus Beasley | Victor Gilpin | Giles Loder | 1:45.40 |
| 1931 | Cameronian | Freddie Fox | Fred Darling | John Arthur Dewar | 1:45.00 |
| 1932 | Andrea | Tommy Weston | Percy Whitaker | Duke of Marlborough | 1:42.20 |
| 1933 | Canon Law | Robert Dick | Joe Lawson | Lord Astor | 1:46.60 |
| 1934 | Flamenco | Harry Wragg | Jack Jarvis | Lord Rosebery | 1:44.20 |
| 1935 | Bahram | Freddie Fox | Frank Butters | Aga Khan III | 1:48.20 |
| 1936 | Rhodes Scholar | Robert Dick | Joe Lawson | Lord Astor | 1:42.00 |
| 1937 | Goya | Charlie Elliott | George Lambton | Marcel Boussac | 1:45.00 |
| 1938 | Scottish Union | Brownie Carslake | Noel Cannon | James V. Rank | 1:43.60 |
| 1939 | Admiral's Walk | Eph Smith | Jack Jarvis | John Arthur Dewar | 1:45.20 |
| 1940 | No race |
| 1941 (Note: The 1941 running took place at Newmarket) | Orthodox | Doug Smith | Noel Cannon | James V. Rank | 1:42.40 |
| 1942-45 | No race |
| 1946 | Khaled | Gordon Richards | Frank Butters | Aga Khan III | 1:48.80 |
| 1947 | Tudor Minstrel | Gordon Richards | Fred Darling | John Arthur Dewar | 1:45.80 |
| 1948 | Black Tarquin | Edgar Britt | Cecil Boyd-Rochfort | William Woodward Sr. | 1:45.40 |
| 1949 | Faux Tirage | Gordon Richards | Noel Murless | John Arthur Dewar | 1:45.00 |
| 1950 | Palestine | Charlie Smirke | Marcus Marsh | Aga Khan III | 1:43.20 |
| 1951 | Turco | Harry Carr | Cecil Boyd-Rochfort | William Woodward Sr. | 1:47.00 |
| 1952 | King's Bench | Gordon Richards | M Feakes | A Tompestt | 1:44.20 |
| 1953 | Nearula | Edgar Britt | Charles Elsey | William Humble | 1:50.20 |
| 1954 | Darius | Manny Mercer | Harry Wragg | Percy Loraine | 1:52.00 |
| 1955 | Tamerlane | Scobie Breasley | Neville Bertie | Lord Porchester | 1:44.14 |
| 1956 | Pirate King | Doug Smith | Humphrey Cottrill | Lionel Brook Holliday | 1:47.38 |
| 1957 | Chevastrid | Jimmy Eddery | Seamus McGrath | Joseph McGrath | 1:47.26 |
| 1958 | Major Portion | Eph Smith | Ted Leader | Jim Joel | 1:43.60 |
| 1959 | Above Suspicion | Harry Carr | Cecil Boyd-Rochfort | Elizabeth II | 1:46.46 |
| 1960 | Venture | George Moore | Alec Head | Aly Khan | 1:54.49 |
| 1961 | Tudor Treasure | Doug Smith | Jack Watts | Lord Derby | 1:44.68 |
| 1962 | Court Sentence | Eph Smith | Ted Leader | Jim Joel | 1:44.43 |
| 1963 | Crocket | Doug Smith | Geoffrey Brooke | D van Clief | 1:50.22 |
| 1964 | Roan Rocket | Lester Piggott | George Todd | T Frost | 1:50.21 |
| 1965 | Silly Season | Geoff Lewis | Ian Balding | Paul Mellon | 1:44.03 |
| 1966 | Track Spare | Jimmy Lindley | Ronald Mason | Ronald Mason | 1:43.76 |
| 1967 | Reform | Scobie Breasley | Gordon Richards | Michael Sobell | 1:47.84 |
| 1968 | Petingo | Lester Piggott | Sam Armstrong | Marcos Lemos | 1:46.43 |
| 1969 | Right Tack | Geoff Lewis | John Sutcliffe | J. R. Brown | 1:45.86 |
| 1970 | Saintly Song | Sandy Barclay | Noel Murless | Stanhope Joel | 1:40.10 |
| 1971 | Brigadier Gerard | Joe Mercer | Dick Hern | Jean Hislop | 1:46.94 |
| 1972 | Sun Prince | Jimmy Lindley | Dick Hern | Sir Michael Sobell | 1:44.00 |
| 1973 | Thatch | Lester Piggott | Vincent O'Brien | Jack Mulcahy | 1:40.50 |
| 1974 | Averof | Brian Taylor | Clive Brittain | Marcos Lemos | 1:41.50 |
| 1975 | Bolkonski | Gianfranco Dettori | Henry Cecil | Carlo d'Alessio | 1:42.50 |
| 1976 | Radetzky | Pat Eddery | Clive Brittain | Curtis Elliot | 1:40.40 |
| 1977 | Don | Edward Hide | Bill Elsey | Eugene Ryan | 1:46.50 |
| 1978 | Jaazeiro | Lester Piggott | Vincent O'Brien | Robert Sangster | 1:40.80 |
| 1979 | Kris | Joe Mercer | Henry Cecil | Lord Howard de Walden | 1:41.74 |
| 1980 | Posse | Pat Eddery | John Dunlop | Ogden Mills Phipps | 1:44.74 |
| 1981 | To-Agori-Mou | Greville Starkey | Guy Harwood | Andry Muinos | 1:39.90 |
| 1982 | Dara Monarch | Michael Kinane | Liam Browne | Mrs Liam Browne | 1:41.10 |
| 1983 | Horage | Steve Cauthen | Matt McCormack | A. Rachid | 1:40.10 |
| 1984 | Chief Singer | Ray Cochrane | Ron Sheather | Jeff Smith | 1:38.90 |
| 1985 | Bairn | Lester Piggott | Luca Cumani | Sheikh Mohammed | 1:41.50 |
| 1986 | Sure Blade | Brent Thomson | Barry Hills | Sheikh Mohammed | 1:41.50 |
| 1987 | Half a Year | Ray Cochrane | Luca Cumani | John C. Mabee | 1:43.42 |
| 1988 | Persian Heights | Pat Eddery | Geoff Huffer | Yazid Saud | 1:39.57 |
| 1989 | Shaadi | Walter Swinburn | Michael Stoute | Sheikh Mohammed | 1:39.33 |
| 1990 | Shavian | Steve Cauthen | Henry Cecil | Lord Howard de Walden | 1:41.52 |
| 1991 | Marju | Willie Carson | John Dunlop | Hamdan Al Maktoum | 1:41.97 |
| 1992 | Brief Truce | Michael Kinane | Dermot Weld | Moyglare Stud Farm | 1:39.32 |
| 1993 | Kingmambo | Cash Asmussen | François Boutin | Stavros Niarchos | 1:44.05 |
| 1994 | Grand Lodge | Michael Kinane | William Jarvis | Lord Howard de Walden | 1:38.83 |
| 1995 | Bahri | Willie Carson | John Dunlop | Hamdan Al Maktoum | 1:40.15 |
| 1996 | Bijou d'Inde | Jason Weaver | Mark Johnston | Stuart Morrison | 1:39.70 |
| 1997 | Starborough | Frankie Dettori | David Loder | Sheikh Mohammed | 1:39.18 |
| 1998 | Dr Fong | Kieren Fallon | Henry Cecil | The Thoroughbred Corp. | 1:41.33 |
| 1999 | Sendawar | Gérald Mossé | Alain de Royer-Dupré | HH Aga Khan IV | 1:39.99 |
| 2000 | Giant's Causeway | Michael Kinane | Aidan O'Brien | Magnier / Tabor | 1:42.61 |
| 2001 | Black Minnaloushe | Johnny Murtagh | Aidan O'Brien | Magnier / Tabor | 1:41.37 |
| 2002 | Rock of Gibraltar | Michael Kinane | Aidan O'Brien | Ferguson / Magnier | 1:40.91 |
| 2003 | Zafeen | Darryll Holland | Mick Channon | Jaber Abdullah | 1:39.91 |
| 2004 | Azamour | Michael Kinane | John Oxx | HH Aga Khan IV | 1:39.02 |
| 2005 (Note: The 2005 running took place at York) | Shamardal | Kerrin McEvoy | Saeed bin Suroor | Godolphin | 1:37.18 |
| 2006 | Araafa | Alan Munro | Jeremy Noseda | Al Homaizi / Al Sagar | 1:39.59 |
| 2007 | Excellent Art | Jamie Spencer | Aidan O'Brien | Sue Magnier et al. | 1:39.33 |
| 2008 | Henrythenavigator | Johnny Murtagh | Aidan O'Brien | Sue Magnier | 1:38.70 |
| 2009 | Mastercraftsman | Johnny Murtagh | Aidan O'Brien | Smith / Magnier / Tabor | 1:39.21 |
| 2010 | Canford Cliffs | Richard Hughes | Richard Hannon Sr. | Heffer / Roy / Instance | 1:39.55 |
| 2011 | Frankel | Tom Queally | Sir Henry Cecil | Khalid Abdullah | 1:39.24 |
| 2012 | Most Improved | Kieren Fallon | Brian Meehan | Iraj Parvizi | 1:40.14 |
| 2013 | Dawn Approach | Kevin Manning | Jim Bolger | Godolphin | 1:39.23 |
| 2014 | Kingman | James Doyle | John Gosden | Khalid Abdullah | 1:39.06 |
| 2015 | Gleneagles | Ryan Moore | Aidan O'Brien | Smith / Magnier / Tabor | 1:38.86 |
| 2016 | Galileo Gold | Frankie Dettori | Hugo Palmer | Al Shaqab Racing | 1:44.01 |
| 2017 | Barney Roy | James Doyle | Richard Hannon Jr. | Godolphin | 1:37.22 |
| 2018 | Without Parole | Frankie Dettori | John Gosden | John & Tanya Gunther | 1:38.64 |
| 2019 | Circus Maximus | Ryan Moore | Aidan O'Brien | Flaxman/ Smith / Magnier / Tabor | 1:39.90 |
| 2020 | Palace Pier | Frankie Dettori | John Gosden | Hamdan bin Mohammed Al Maktoum | 1:42.38 |
| 2021 | Poetic Flare | Kevin Manning | Jim Bolger | Jackie Bolger | 1:37.04 |
| 2022 | Coroebus | William Buick | Charlie Appleby | Godolphin | 1:39.42 |
| 2023 | Paddington | Ryan Moore | Aidan O'Brien | Tabor, Smith, Magnier, Westerberg, Brant | 1:40.74 |
| 2024 | Rosallion | Sean Levey | Richard Hannon Jr. | Sheikh Mohammed Obaid Al Maktoum | 1:38.38 |
| 2025 | Field Of Gold | Colin Keane | John & Thady Gosden | Juddmonte | 1:38.41 |
| 2026 | Bow Echo | Billy Loughnane | George Boughey | Exors Of The Late Sheikh Mohammed Obaid | 1:38.48 |

== Earlier winners ==
- 1834: Plenipotentiary
- 1835: Ascot
- 1836–37: no race
- 1838: Boeotian
- 1839: Euclid
- 1840: Scutari
- 1841: Satirist
- 1842: Misdeal
- 1843: Ameer
- 1844: Ionian
- 1845: Idas
- 1846: The Free Lance
- 1847: Montpensier
- 1848: Glendower
- 1849: Uriel
- 1850: Nutcracker
- 1851: The Ban
- 1852: Daniel O'Rourke
- 1853: The Reiver
- 1854: Baalbec
- 1855: Paletot
- 1856: Pitapat
- 1857: Anton
- 1858: Fitz-Roland
- 1859: Cynricus
- 1860: Tom Bowline
- 1861: Walloon
- 1862: Carisbrook
- 1863: Gladstone
- 1864: The Beadle
- 1865: Lasaretto
- 1866: Staghound
- 1867: Hermit
- 1868: The Earl
- 1869: Dunbar
- 1870: King Cole
- 1871: Dalnacardoch
- 1872: Queen's Messenger
- 1873: Gang Forward
- 1874: Leolinus
- 1875: Bay of Naples
- 1876: Great Tom
- 1877: Covenanter
- 1878: Bonnie Scotland
- 1879: Rayon d'Or
- 1880: Bend Or
- 1881: Iroquois
- 1882: Battlefield
- 1883: Galliard
- 1884: Cambusmore
- 1885: Sheraton
- 1886: Ormonde
- 1887: Florentine
- 1888: Ossory / Galore ^{1}
- 1889: Pioneer
- 1890: Janissary
- 1891: Common
- 1892: St Angelo
- 1893: Phocion
- 1894: Florizel II
- 1895: Troon
- 1896: His Reverence
- 1897: Vesuvian
- 1898: Cap Martin
- 1899: Millennium

^{1} The 1888 race was a dead-heat and has joint winners.

== See also ==
- Horse racing in Great Britain
- List of British flat horse races
