= Bahram (horse) =

Irish-bred Thoroughbred racehorse (1932–1956)

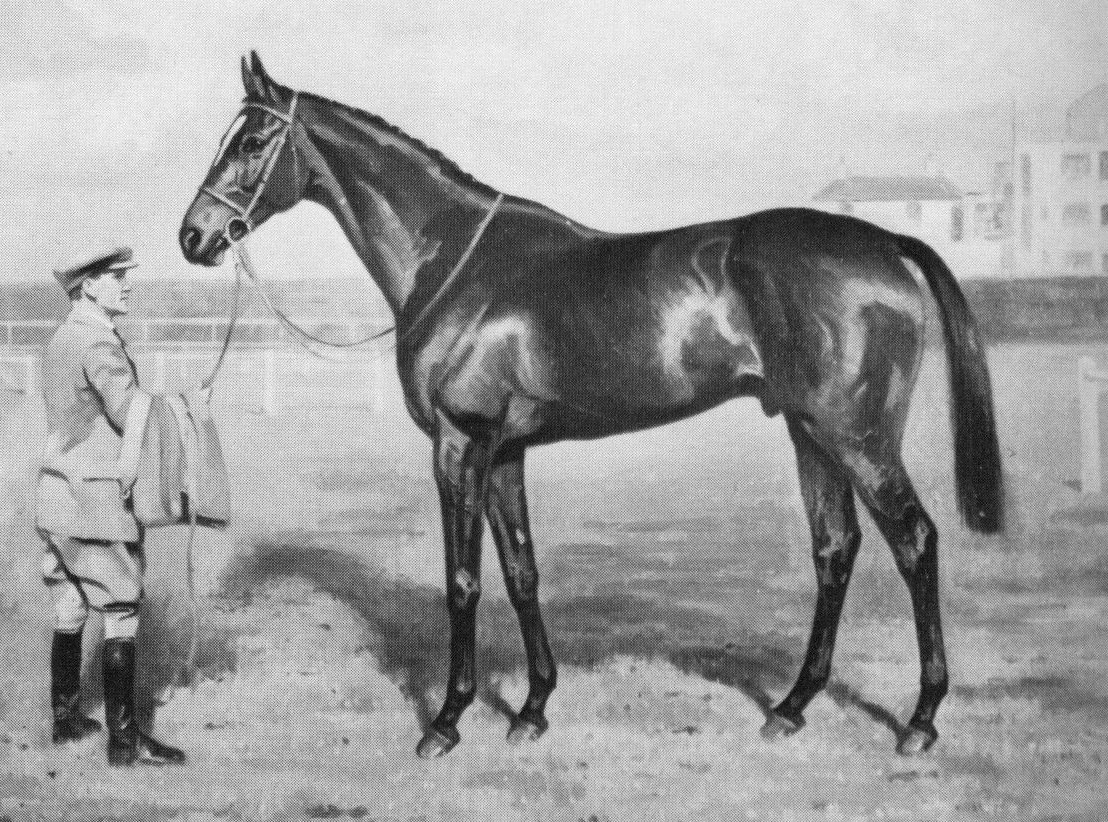
- Sire: Blandford
- Grandsire: Swynford
- Dam: Friar's Daughter
- Damsire: Friar Marcus
- Sex: Stallion
- Foaled: 1932
- Country: Ireland
- Colour: Bay
- Breeder: HH Aga Khan III
- Owner: HH Aga Khan III
- Trainer: Frank Butters
- Record: 9: 9-0-0
- Earnings: £43,086

Major wins
- National Breeder's Produce Stakes (1934); Rous Memorial Stakes (1934); Gimcrack Stakes (1934); Middle Park Stakes (1934); 2000 Guineas (1935); Epsom Derby (1935); St. Leger Stakes (1935); St. James's Palace Stakes (1935)

Awards
- 14th U.K. Triple Crown Champion (1935)
- Last updated on 13 March 2025

Bahram (1932–1956) was an Irish-bred, English-trained Thoroughbred racehorse. He was undefeated in nine races in a career that lasted from July 1934 until September 1935. He was named "horse of the century". The leading British two-year-old of 1934, Bahram went on to take the Triple Crown in 1935 by winning the 2000 Guineas Stakes, Epsom Derby and St. Leger Stakes. He was retired to stud at the end of the year. After a promising start to his breeding career in Britain, he was exported to the United States, where he had moderate success before being exported again to Argentina.

== Background ==
Bahram was a bay horse with a white star and strip foaled at the HH Aga Khan III's stud farm on The Curragh, Ireland. He was by the highly successful stallion Blandford, who sired four Derby winners and was British Champion sire on three occasions. His dam, Friar's Daughter, was inbred to St Simon in the third and fourth generations. Friar's Daughter won one small race, but was a good broodmare who produced eleven winners of over £58,000' including Dastur, who finished runner-up in all three legs of the Triple Crown in 1932 and Sadri II By Solario who was exported to South Africa and won the 1941 July Handicap. Bahram stood 16.2 hands high, had a good temperament, and was described by equine experts as having flawless conformation. The Aga Khan originally registered the colt as "Bahman" but renamed him in honour of his cousin, who was killed in the torpedoing of the SS Sussex in 1916. Bahram was trained by Frank Butters for the Aga Khan at Newmarket in England. His regular rider was the veteran jockey Frederick Fox (1888–1945).

== Racing career ==
=== 1934: two-year-old season ===
Bahram made his debut in the valuable National Breeders Produce Stakes at Sandown Park Racecourse in July for which he started a 20/1 outsider. He won by a neck from his more fancied stable companion Theft, who had won the Windsor Castle Stakes at Royal Ascot in a result which reportedly stunned the crowd. Later in July, Bahram won the Rous Memorial Stakes at Goodwood before being sent to York for the Gimcrack Stakes in which he ran lazily and had to be driven out to win by a length from Consequential.

In the autumn he was sent to Newmarket where he won the Boscawen Stakes before contesting the Middle Park Stakes, one of the year's most prestigious races for juveniles, which he won in a record time of 1:11.2. In the Free Handicap, a rating of the season's best two-year-olds, Bahram was awarded top weight of 133 pounds, a pound ahead of his stable companions Theft and Hairan.

=== 1935: three-year-old season ===
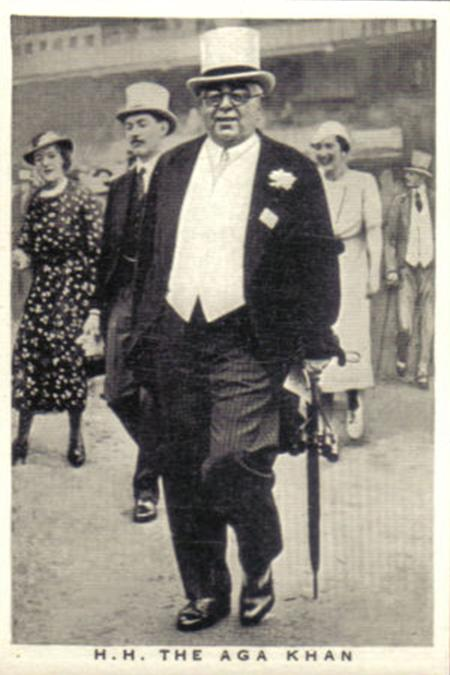
The Aga Khan in 1936

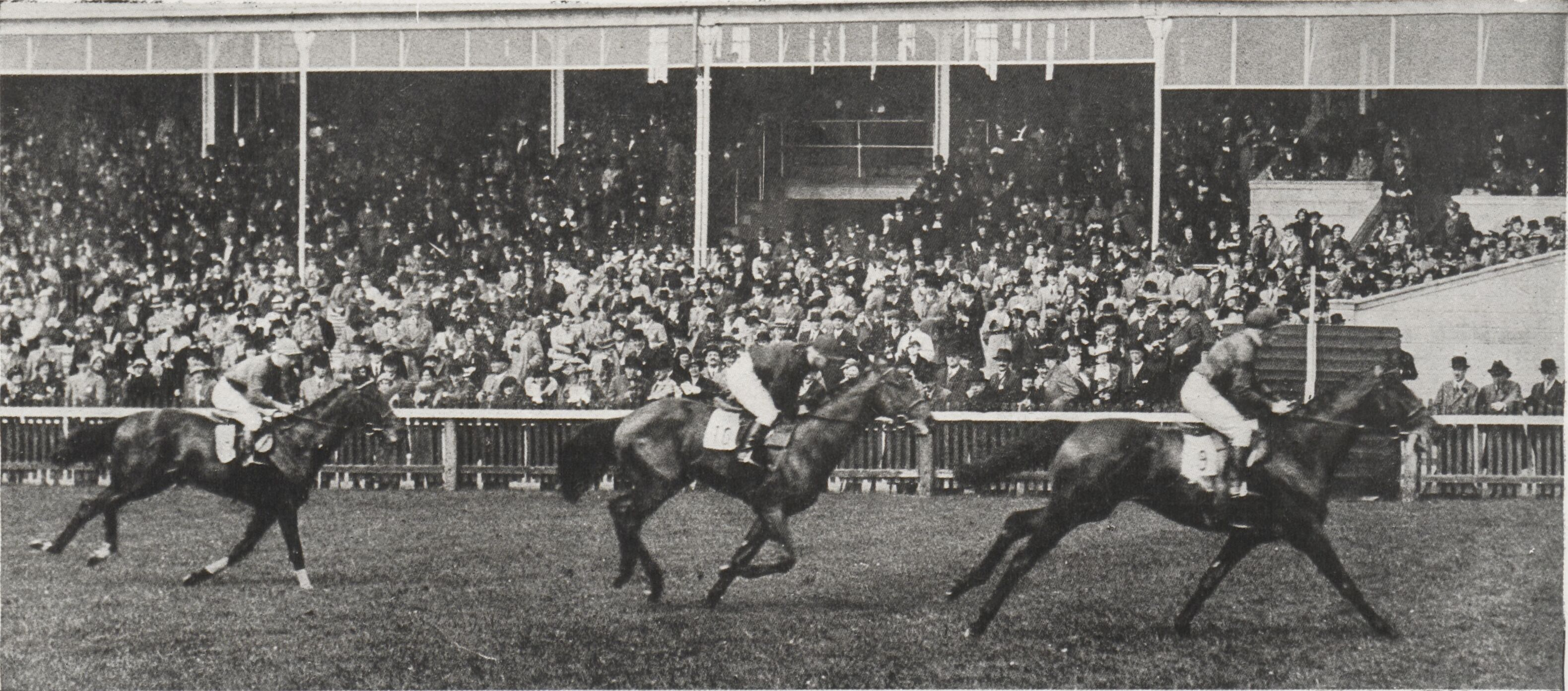
Finish of 2000 Guineas Stakes (1 May 1935, Newmarket).

By the spring of 1935 Bahram had grown into a handsome, impressive horse with a placid, lazy temperament. He missed an intended run at Newmarket's Craven meeting in April and made his first appearance of the season in the 2000 Guineas. Ridden by Freddie Fox he started at odds of 7/2 in a field of sixteen runners. He won "comfortably" by one and a half lengths from Theft, with Sea Bequest two lengths away in third.

A month after his win at Newmarket, Bahram started 5/4 favourite for the Derby at Epsom. The race was run in bright sunshine, despite previous heavy rain, and was attended by a crowd estimated at 500,000 including King George V who was celebrating his Silver Jubilee. Bahram was towards the rear of the field in the early stages but was always travelling well. Fox moved him up to third place at Tattenham corner before accelerating into the lead early in the straight. He won very comfortably by two lengths from Robin Goodfellow and Field Trial, with Theft in fourth. Later in June, Bahram started at odds of 1/8 in the St. James's Palace Stakes at Royal Ascot and won from Portfolio. In August, Bahram's training was delayed by the "coughing epidemic" which struck many British stables in late summer.

At Doncaster in September, Bahram started 4/11 favourite for the St. Leger Stakes in his bid to become the first winner of the traditional Triple Crown since Rock Sand in 1903 (Pommern, Gay Crusader and Gainsborough had won wartime "Triple Crowns" but these included substitute races run at Newmarket). Since Rock Sand, four colts had attempted the feat but St. Amant (sixth in 1904), Minoru (4th in 1909), Manna (tenth in 1925) and Cameronian (tenth and last in 1931) had all been well-beaten at Doncaster. He was ridden by Charlie Smirke, Fox having sustained serious injuries in a fall the previous day. Bahram won very easily by five lengths from Solar Ray, with Buckleigh a further three lengths away in third. After the race Smirke claimed that Bahram could have won carrying "12 Stone and two riders".

== Assessment ==
On Bahram's retirement, he was described as the "Horse of the Century" by his owner, an assessment with which the Daily Mail concurred, although The Times regarded him as inferior to Windsor Lad.

In their book A Century of Champions, John Randall and Tony Morris rated Bahram the twenty-eighth best horse of the 20th Century and the seventh best Derby winner, behind Sea-Bird, Hyperion, Mill Reef, Nijinsky, Shergar and Windsor Lad.

Bahram was reportedly even lazier at home than he was on the racecourse, making him a difficult horse to assess. His trainer, Frank Butters, admitted that "I never knew how good he was".

== Stud record ==
At the end of the 1935 racing season Bahram was retired to Egerton Stud in Newmarket where he stood at a service fee of 500 guineas per mare. With just two crops racing, Bahram became the second leading sire in 1940 and leading juvenile sire of 1941. Among his English progeny were Big Game (2000 Guineas and Champion Stakes), Persian Gulf winner of the Coronation Cup and sire of the Derby winner Parthia, Turkhan, winner of the 1940 St. Leger Stakes and Irish Derby and Zabara, and the winners of 469 races. Bahram was also the damsire of Noor who competed successfully in England as well as in America where he would be inducted into the United States' National Museum of Racing and Hall of Fame.

Following the German occupation of France during World War II, the Aga Khan fled France to the safety of Switzerland, and in September 1940, sold Bahram for £40,000 to an American syndicate made up of Walter P. Chrysler Jr., Alfred G. Vanderbilt II, James Cox Brady, Jr. and Sylvester Labrot, Jr. In 1941, the horse was brought to Vanderbilt's Sagamore Stud in Maryland then to Walter Chrysler Jr.'s North Wales Stud in Warrenton, Virginia. However, there was considerable resentment amongst British breeders against the Aga Khan for selling to overseas buyers all five of his Derby winners, particularly the three from the Blandford line, Bahram, Blenheim and Blenheim's son, Mahmoud. All of them were considered a severe loss to British breeding stock. Also sired Senegal, an Argentinian bred who won many races in his country and after was shuttle to Venezuela Here was a notorious champion in the former El Paraiso Race Course and was the first to win twice the Clásico Simon Bolivar (1955, 1956) the most famous race in this country.

In the US Bahram sired the winners of 660 races worth two million dollars. In 1946 Bahram was sold for a reported $130,000 to a stud farm in Argentina where he met with only modest success before his death at 24 years of age in 1956.

== Sire line tree ==
Descendants of Bahram (click to show)
- Bahram
  - The Druid
    - Rutilante
    - Big Red
    - El Gaucho
      - Gauchesco
    - Luchador
  - Turkhan
    - Isfahan
      - Sir Isfahan
    - Turkish Prince
    - Turk's Reliance
      - Kazuyoshi
  - Big Game
    - Combat
      - Combustion
      - Aggressor
        - Streetfighter
        - Fire Crest
        - Activator
        - Chivas Regal
    - Murrayfield
    - Stockade
      - Teranyan
    - Yoyo
    - Henley-In-Arden
    - Hunter's Moon
    - Nebris
    - Bear Dance
    - Bobo
    - Faux Tirage
      - Hot Drop
      - Knave
      - Motueka
      - Seven Seas
      - Straight Draw
      - Amanullah
      - Rover
      - Tira Mink
      - Magician
      - Baraboo
      - Glensharold
      - Game
      - Hodmandod
      - Papillon
        - Tamboura
    - Gigantic
      - Red Crest
      - Royal Duty
      - Empyreus
      - Terrific
      - Mannix
      - Not Again
      - Town Beau
    - Makarpura
      - Best Blend
      - Little Roderick
    - Tembu
    - War Game
    - Jungle King
    - Khorassan
      - Coleridge
      - Melanion
      - Tulloch
      - Royal Khora
      - Baloo
      - Dardanus
    - King's Command
    - Cannon Game
    - Game Law
    - Master Bowman
    - Good Shot
    - Big Burn
      - Reynald
    - Masai King
    - Border Chief
    - Moon Game
      - Yootha
    - Rally
    - Head Hunter
      - Jan's Beau
      - Chimbu
    - Bellagioca
  - Birikan
    - Umm
    - Bolivar
  - Hern The Hunter
  - Shah Rookh
  - Babershah
  - Baman
    - Bantam
    - Bucentauro
  - Brehon Law
    - Jabato
    - Pumba
    - Murillo
    - Naranco
    - Narrichkin
  - Persian Gulf
    - Abadan
      - Jack Ketch
      - My Pal
        - Rio
    - Khor-Mousa
    - Papayer
      - Paradox
    - Arab Legion
    - Arabian Night
    - Zarathustra
      - Zaleucus
        - Reprieve
        - Zell
      - Crozier
    - Tamerlane
      - Eastern Nip
      - Final Problem
      - Indian Conquest
        - Questilla
      - Marlon
        - Mowgli
        - Montevideo
        - Mentor
      - Cassim
      - Flying Star
      - Lanesborough
        - Beer Street
        - Piping Lane
      - Tambel
      - Tiger
        - Nor
      - Dschingis Khan
        - Uditore
        - Alfredo
        - Cagliostro
        - Konigsstuhl
        - Elektrant
        - Orofino
        - Orfano
      - King's Lane
      - Young Turnabout
        - Valencia Boy
      - Tycoon
        - Haveroid
      - Streakie
      - Tamermarc
      - Origines
      - Alpenkonig
        - Tuttlinger
        - Lorimer
        - Slenderhagen
        - Ganymed
        - Sevillano
        - Foscari
      - Eric
      - Eucalyptus
      - Tamil
      - Lane Court
        - Homosassa
      - Tamerino
        - Domingo
      - Trainer's Seat
        - Satan's Son
    - Clarification
      - Resolution
      - Top Rank
      - I'll Be There
    - Rustam
      - Talahasse
      - Double Jump
        - Doleswood
    - Zimone
      - Rockstone
      - Tanno
      - Caronte
      - Conte Zimon
      - Shank
        - Rio
    - Agreement
    - Rhythmic Light
    - Persian Road
    - Restoration
    - Parthia
      - Um Said
      - Djelo Binza
      - Greek God
      - Sloop
        - Sloppy
      - Fujino Parthia
      - Parthian Plain
    - Istanbul
      - Khalif
        - Khaleben
    - Proud Chieftain
      - House Proud
      - Owen Anthony
        - Cannon King
    - Persian Lancer
    - Perspex
    - Idle Hour
      - Figonero
        - Patrick McFig
      - Vincitore
      - Farley
    - Persian Wonder
      - Shah Abbas
      - Pedlar
      - Majestic Crown
      - Archangel
      - Mithra
      - Big Swinger
      - Great Sun
      - Supreme Charger
      - Ton Up
    - Beau Persan
    - Gulf Pearl
      - Deep Diver
        - Challenger Trench
        - Deep Run
      - Proof Positive
      - Portese
      - Sea Chimes
    - Persian War
    - Cornelscourt
      - Royale
    - Shogun
      - Shamrock
  - Rangoon
  - Treasure Hunt
    - Regal Diamond
  - Whirlaway
    - Alister
  - Bois de Rose
    - Idlewild
  - Fair Aim
  - Super Duper
  - Cedar Creek
  - Stud Poker
  - Manchac
  - Yankee Hill
  - Basis
  - Stone Age
  - Sun Bahram
  - Bahram Son
    - Puerto Rico
  - His Honour
    - His Boy
  - Baxar
    - Bonete
  - Naranjal
  - Ravel
  - Hold On
    - Lepanto
  - Manipour
  - Avro
  - Senegal
    - Antar

== Pedigree ==
Pedigree of Bahram (IRE), bay stallion, 1932
Sire Blandford Bay 1919	Swynford; Bay 1907	John O'Gaunt	Isinglass
Sire Blandford Bay 1919	Swynford; Bay 1907	John O'Gaunt	La Fleche*
Sire Blandford Bay 1919	Swynford; Bay 1907	Canterbury Pilgrim	Tristan
Sire Blandford Bay 1919	Swynford; Bay 1907	Canterbury Pilgrim	Pilgrimage
Sire Blandford Bay 1919	Blanche; Bay 1912	White Eagle	Gallinule
Sire Blandford Bay 1919	Blanche; Bay 1912	White Eagle	Merry Gal
Sire Blandford Bay 1919	Blanche; Bay 1912	Black Cherry	Bendigo
Sire Blandford Bay 1919	Blanche; Bay 1912	Black Cherry	Black Duchess
Dam Friar's Daughter Bay 1921	Friar Marcus; Bay 1912	Cicero	Cyllene
Dam Friar's Daughter Bay 1921	Friar Marcus; Bay 1912	Cicero	Gas
Dam Friar's Daughter Bay 1921	Friar Marcus; Bay 1912	Prim Nun	Persimmon*
Dam Friar's Daughter Bay 1921	Friar Marcus; Bay 1912	Prim Nun	Nunsuch
Dam Friar's Daughter Bay 1921	Garron Lass; Bay 1917	Roseland	William the Third*
Dam Friar's Daughter Bay 1921	Garron Lass; Bay 1917	Roseland	Electric Rose
Dam Friar's Daughter Bay 1921	Garron Lass; Bay 1917	Concertina	St Simon*
Dam Friar's Daughter Bay 1921	Garron Lass; Bay 1917	Concertina	Cosmic Song (Family: 16-a)

* Bahram is inbred 5S x 5D x 5D x 4D to the stallion St Simon, meaning that he appears fifth generation once (via La Fleche) on the sire side of his pedigree, and fifth generation twice (via Persimmon and William the Third) and fourth generation once on the dam side of his pedigree.

== See also ==
- List of leading Thoroughbred racehorses
