= Gordon Richards (jockey) =

English jockey (1904–1986)

Sir Gordon Richards
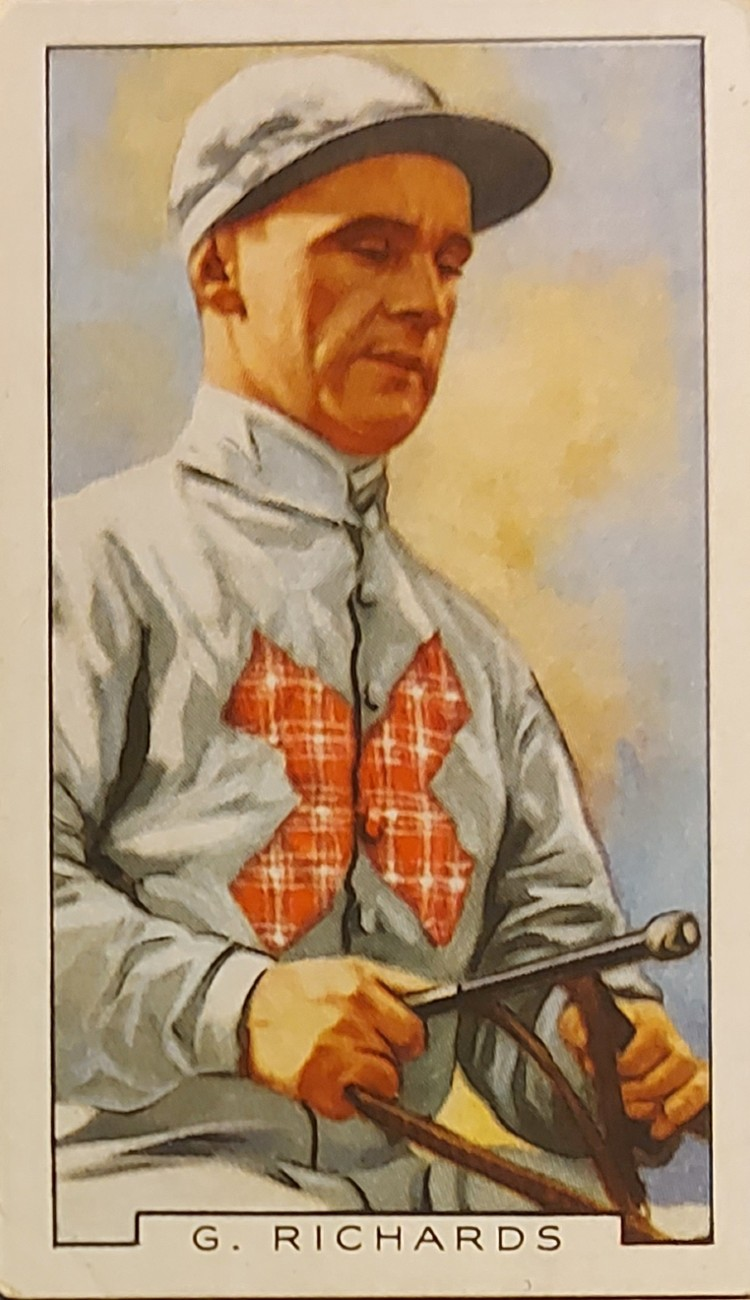
- Gordon Richards, in the colours of J. A. Dewar (Gallaher's cigarette card, 1936)

Personal information
- Born: 5 May 1904 Donnington Wood, Telford
- Died: 10 November 1986 (aged 82) Kintbury, Berkshire
- Occupation: Jockey

Horse racing career
- Sport: Horse racing
- Career wins: 4,870 (from 21,843 rides)

Major racing wins
- British Classic Race wins: 1000 Guineas (1942, 1948, 1951); 2000 Guineas (1938, 1942, 1947); Derby (1953); Oaks (1930, 1942); St Leger (1930, 1937, 1940, 1942, 1944); Other major race wins: Gold Cup (1934, 1942, 1943, 1944, 1952); Champion Stakes (1932, 1933, 1942, 1943, 1947); Coronation Cup (1937, 1939); Coronation Stakes (1951); Dewhurst Stakes (1936, 1940, 1943, 1946, 1948, 1952); Eclipse Stakes (1938); Goodwood Cup (1932, 1934); July Cup (1933, 1949, 1950, 1951, 1953); King George VI and Queen Elizabeth Stakes (1953); Middle Park Stakes (1933, 1937, 1945, 1947, 1948, 1953); Nunthorpe Stakes (1939, 1949, 1950, 1952); St. James's Palace Stakes (1947, 1949, 1952); Sussex Stakes (1928, 1936, 1937, 1946, 1947, 1949, 1951, 1952)

Racing awards
- Champion jockey 26 times

Honours
- Knighthood (1953), Honorary Member of the Jockey Club (1970)

Memorials
- Gordon Richards Stakes

Significant horses
- Abernant, Belle of All, Big Game, Brulette, Cameronian, Chatelaine, Chulmleigh, Combat, Felicitation, Khaled, Migoli, Myrobella, Nasrullah, Owen Tudor, Pasch, Pinza, Queenpot, Rose of England, Scottish Union, Singapore, Sun Chariot, Tehran, Tudor Minstrel, Turkhan

Sir Gordon Richards (5 May 1904 – 10 November 1986) was an English jockey who was the champion jockey 26 times. He is often considered one of the world's greatest jockeys. He remains the only flat jockey to have received a knighthood.

== Early life ==
Richards was brought up in the Shropshire village of Donnington Wood (now part of Telford). He was born at Ivy Row (now demolished), the third son of eight surviving children of coal miner Nathan and former dressmaker Elizabeth. His mother was the daughter of another miner, William Dean, who was also a lay preacher, and Richards was given a strict Methodist upbringing. The family later moved during his childhood to Wrockwardine Wood where they lived in a row of cottages called The Limes, Plough Road, built on land bought by his mother. His father reared several pit ponies at their home, and fostered the young Richards' love of equestrian sport. He rode the ponies bareback from an early age, then from the age of seven drove the pony and trap passenger service his family ran between Wrockwardine Wood and Oakengates station. It is said that this is when he developed his unique riding style, using a long rein and an upright stance. He had two brothers, Colin and Clifford, who shared this love of horses and also became jockeys: the latter was a Classic-winning jockey.

== Career ==
Leaving school at the age of 13, Richards became a junior clerk in the warehouse of the nearby Lilleshall Company engineering works, sometimes riding a pony to work. He found work as a clerk monotonous and already held ambitions of a career with horses. He answered a newspaper advertisement to be an apprentice to Martin Hartigan, trainer at the Foxhill Stable near Swindon, Wiltshire, owned by Jimmy White, and on New Year's Day 1920 left home to move there.

His riding skills were soon noticed by his new employer, who gave him his first ride in a race at Lincoln on 16 October 1920, after a deal struck during a football match against the neighbouring Osbourne Stables. White had bet on his stable to win, and the match stood at three all when his team were awarded a penalty. White insisted that Richards take it, with the incentive that he would ride at Lincoln the next day if he scored. He did, and got to ride the horse, called Clock-Work. He weighed out at 6 stone 9 pounds. His first win came the following season: Gay Lord at Leicester on 31 March 1921. He soon became known by the nickname of "Moppy", for his thick, black hair.

=== First championship ===
His apprenticeship at Foxhill lasted until 1924, when he moved to become first jockey to Captain Thomas Hogg, based at Russley Park, Wiltshire, near Lambourn. That first season as a fully-fledged professional, 1925, he became Champion Jockey for the first time, with 118 wins.

Early in the following year, however, he contracted tuberculosis, which put his burgeoning career in jeopardy. Following diagnosis, he spent the rest of the year in a Norfolk sanitarium. While he was recuperating, he met fellow patient Bill Rowell who was to have a major influence on his life. Rowell became a friend and mentor, teaching the young jockey how to cope with wealth, and his increasing fame among high society in Britain's inter-war class system. In Richards' absence from riding, Tommy Weston won the championship; but by December, he had returned to the saddle and in 1927 regained his title with 164 winners, following up in 1928 and 1929.

By now, shipping magnate William Tatem, 1st Baron Glanely had retained his services. Hogg had become his private trainer, in Newmarket. For Glanely, he won his first classics – the 1930 Oaks on Rose of England and the 1930 St Leger on Singapore – and narrowly missed out on a fourth successive title to Freddie Fox. As the season drew to a close, he won the November Handicap for Glanely on Glorious Devon, putting him one ahead of Fox, but Fox won the fourth and fifth races to overhaul him.

=== Fred Darling ===
After retaking the championship in 1931 with 141 winners, he was made a substantial offer to become stable jockey to Fred Darling. Richards offered Glanely the chance to match it, but he declined. The move proved fruitful, and in his first season he scored 259 victories, breaking Fred Archer's longstanding record for the greatest number of wins in a year and becoming a national hero in the process. This included 11 consecutive victories at Chepstow in early October, as he closed in on Archer's target of 246, finally surpassing that total on Golden King at Liverpool on 8 November. He would break the record again himself in 1947, and retain it for nearly 50 years.

Throughout the 1930s, he came frustratingly close to winning a first Derby. In 1934, he rode Easton into second, and in 1936 was unlucky on Taj Akbar for the Aga Khan, being badly hampered before again finishing second, this time to the Aga Khan's second string Mahmoud. In 1938, Darling's two horses were Pasch, on which Richards had won the 2000 Guineas and French import Bois Roussel. Richards stayed loyal to Pasch, and finished third to Bois Roussel. His bad luck in the race was becoming proverbial.

During World War II, Richards was not required to serve in the armed forces on account of his prior tuberculosis. This meant he could keep riding, adding further titles in 1939 and 1940, but missing out again (to Harry Wragg this time) after he broke a leg at Salisbury in May 1941.

On George VI's Sun Chariot in 1942, he won the Fillies' Triple Crown of 1,000 Guineas, Oaks and St Leger. He also won the substitute 2,000 Guineas for the king on Big Game on the way to another championship. In 1943, he became the jockey with the most wins in British history, surpassing Archer's career total of 2748 winners on Scotch Mist at Windsor and took a 16th championship.

At Newmarket in 1947, he won the 2,000 Guineas aboard Tudor Minstrel by 8 lengths, the largest winning margin in the race since 1900. It was described shortly afterwards as "possibly the greatest feat in racing." As heavily backed favourite for the Derby, the horse seemed set to break Richards' hoodoo in the race; however, he failed to stay and finished fourth. This did not stop Richards' march to a twentieth championship with the record-breaking total of 269 winners.

His partnership with Fred Darling lasted 16 years, until the trainer retired. Richards said of him, "I unhesitatingly describe him as a genius. There has been no trainer like him and there will never be another." Sir Noel Murless took over the stable at Beckhampton and Richards continued on as stable jockey. His greatest horse for Murless, was grey sprinter Abernant, dual winner of the Nunthorpe Stakes.

=== Later career and knighthood ===
Despite the successes, the Derby still eluded him. The 1953 race occurred on a week of great national, and personal celebration for Richards himself, as he became the first jockey to receive a knighthood. On being awarded the knighthood, he memorably joked, "I never dreamed I'd end up being the shortest knight of the year." It was awarded "as much in recognition of his exemplary integrity as of his professional achievement".

This time Sir Gordon rode Pinza, a huge horse for a flat-thoroughbred at 16 hands high, and he rode a terrific race. Pinza was in second position through much of the one-and-half-mile (2414 m) course, competing against the Queen's own horse Aureole, and sweeping past the Aga Khan III's horse, Shikampur, into first place with just two furlongs remaining. The long-awaited win was accompanied by thunderous cheers from the frenzied crowd. On winning the Derby in what was to be his final attempt, Richards was promptly summoned from the winners' enclosure to be congratulated by the Queen.

A little over a year later, he broke his pelvis and four ribs when being thrown by Abergeldie in the Sandown Park paddock on 10 July 1954. This enforced his retirement. He had ridden 4,870 winners from 21,843 rides and been champion jockey twenty-six times.

Following his retirement he declined an offer to stand for Parliament as Conservative candidate for his native Wrekin constituency.

== Training career ==
Subsequently, Richards trained at Beckhampton and Ogbourne Maizey in Wiltshire, and finally Whitsbury, Hampshire. His training career was less stellar than his riding one, but not without success.

His main owners were the partnership of Sir Michael Sobell and his son-in-law Lord Weinstock. They placed their first horse, London Cry, with Richards in 1957 and he went on to win the Cambridgeshire Handicap of 1958. Richards also trained Pipe Of Peace, the champion two-year-old colt of 1956. The Sobell/Weinstock owned colt Reform was probably his finest horse, winning 11 of his 14 starts including the Champion Stakes, St James's Palace Stakes and the Sussex Stakes. He also trained for Lady Beaverbrook when she took up her interest in racing. An early owner was Dorothy Paget, and when she died he was an influence in Sobell and Weinstock purchasing her Ballymacoll Stud, breeding and racing stock. His stable jockey for much of his training career was Scobie Breasley, and when he retired Edward Hide took over.

At the end of the 1970 season, circumstances forced his hand and he had to give up training: the bookmaker William Hill, from whom he leased his stables, wished to restart his breeding operation there. Sobell and Weinstock negotiated to buy West Ilsley Stables from Jakie Astor, but a stipulation of the purchase was that incumbent trainer Dick Hern, and stable jockey Joe Mercer remained in place. He gave up training, but was elected an honorary member of the Jockey Club that year.

He took up the role of Racing Manager in 1971 to Sobell, Weinstock and Lady Beaverbrook, and continued as such until his death. In this capacity he worked closely with Hern and was particularly active in the purchasing of yearlings for Lady Beaverbrook. Under his management these owners had tremendous success with horses such as Sun Prince, Sallust, Admetus, Cistus, Troy and Sun Princess (for Sobell/Weinstock), and Boldboy, Bustino, Relkino, Niniski and Petoski (for Lady Beaverbrook).

== Riding style and reputation ==
In rating him the top jockey of the 20th century, the Racing Post said of Richards that he "bestrode the sport like a colossus" and "by his skill, integrity, consistency and longevity in the saddle, and his attractive personality, brought more credit to his profession than any other jockey has ever done." He was particularly known for his determination and single-mindedness.

He had the "ideal physique" for a jockey, being short, stocky and very strong for his weight, but his style was unorthodox, riding upright and with a long rein. In a driving finish, he would turn almost sideways, flourish his whip and apparently throw his reins at his mount. Even so, horses "ran as straight as a die" for him. John Hislop, an expert in riding technique, noted how Richards would win on horses which no other jockey could have got home first, and had the knack of making an apparently beaten horse run on.

Clive Brittain, who was an apprentice with Murless at the time Richards was there, described him as "a warm, generous and modest man" whose "integrity and loyalty were beyond reproach." "When you rode work with him, if you made a mistake, he only needed to tell you once. He commanded respect wherever he went."

It is also said he was a "kind and down-to-earth man, who never lost touch with his Shropshire roots".

== Personal life ==
Richards married Margery Gladys (d. 1982), daughter of Swindon railway carriage fitter Thomas David Winckle on 1 March 1928. They had three sons and a daughter. The daughter and one of the sons were twins, but the son only lived a few hours.

He published his autobiography, My Story, in 1955.

== Death and legacy ==
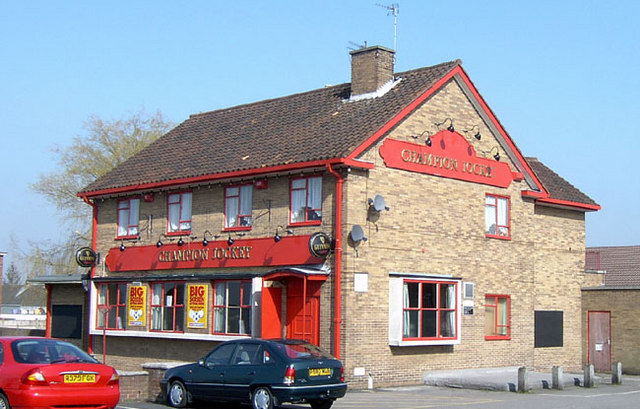
The (now demolished) Champion Jockey pub in Telford, named in his honour

Richards died of a heart attack at his home, Dove House, Kintbury, Berkshire, on 10 November 1986. His funeral service was held at St Mary's, Kintbury, and he was buried at St Mary's Church, Marlborough, Wiltshire.

In his home county of Shropshire his feats were celebrated in Donnington with a pub, The Champion Jockey, named in his honour, and the 'Pinza Suite' in Telford Theatre (originally Oakengates Town Hall which he officially opened in 1968), named after his winning horse. The public house, demolished 2009, has not survived. On the site of his birthplace in Ivy Row, Donnington, have been built the apartment blocks Gordon House and Richards House in Cordingley Way, which were officially opened by Richards in 1975.

Within racing, the Gordon Richards Stakes, a Group 3 race at Sandown Park, has been named in his honour.

In 1999, the Racing Post listed him at number 17 in their list of 100 Makers of 20th century horse racing and number 1 in their list of the Top 50 jockeys of the 20th century.

In 2002, Richards' record number of victories in a season was exceeded, by jump jockey Tony McCoy, although McCoy had been able to fly between tracks and was able to compete in more races in the season than was possible in Richards' time. Richards' total of 4,870 winners is still a British Flat record. He also holds the record for the most consecutive winners ridden – 12 (half at a night meeting) – and the record for most years as champion jockey – 26.

== Major wins ==
(United Kingdom) Great Britain

- 1000 Guineas – (3) – Sun Chariot (1942), Queenpot (1948), Belle of All (1951)
- 2000 Guineas – (3) – Pasch (1938), Big Game (1942), Tudor Minstrel (1947)
- Champion Stakes – (5) – Cameronian (1932), Chatelaine (1933), Big Game (1942), Nasrullah (1943), Migoli (1947)
- Coronation Cup – (2) – His Grace (1937), Scottish Union (1939)
- Coronation Stakes – Belle of All (1951)
- Derby – Pinza (1953)
- Dewhurst Stakes – (6) – Sultan Mohamed (1936), Fettes (1940), Effervescence (1943), Migoli (1946), Royal Forest (1948), Pinza (1952)
- Eclipse Stakes – Pasch (1938)
- Gold Cup – (5) – Felicitation (1934), Owen Tudor (1942), Ujiji (1943), Umiddad (1944), Aquino (1952)
- Goodwood Cup – (2) – Brulette (1932), Loosestrife (1934)
- July Cup – (5) – Myrobella (1933), Abernant (1949), Abernant (1950), Hard Sauce (1951), Devon Vintage (1953)
- King George VI and Queen Elizabeth Stakes – Pinza (1953)
- Middle Park Stakes – (6) – Medieval Knight (1933), Scottish Union (1937), Khaled (1945), The Cobbler (1947), Abernant (1948), Royal Challenger (1953)
- Nunthorpe Stakes – (4) – Portobello (1939), Abernant (1949), Abernant (1950), Royal Serenade (1952)
- Oaks – (2) – Rose of England (1930), Sun Chariot (1942)
- St. James's Palace Stakes – (3) – Tudor Minstrel (1947), Faux Tirage (1949), King's Bench (1952)
- St Leger – (5) – Singapore (1930), Chulmleigh (1937), Turkhan (1940), Sun Chariot (1942), Tehran (1944)
- Sussex Stakes – (8) – Marconigram (1928), Corpach (1936), Pascal (1937), Radiotherapy (1946), Combat (1947), Krakatao (1949), Le Sage (1951), Agitator (1952)

== See also ==
- List of jockeys
