= Pinza =

British-bred Thoroughbred racehorse

- Sire: Chanteur
- Grandsire: Chateau Bouscaut
- Dam: Pasqua
- Damsire: Donatello
- Sex: Stallion
- Foaled: 1950
- Country: Great Britain
- Colour: Bay
- Breeder: Fred Darling
- Owner: Victor Sassoon
- Trainer: Norman Bertie
- Record: 7:5-1-0
- Earnings: £47,401

Major wins
- Dewhurst Stakes (1952); Newmarket Stakes (1953); Epsom Derby (1953); King George VI & Queen Elizabeth Stakes (1953)

Honours
- Deltic locomotive 55007 was named Pinza
- Last updated on April 7, 2008

Pinza (1950–1977) was a Thoroughbred racehorse and sire. In a career which lasted just over a year– from July 1952 until July 1953– he ran seven times and won five races. He was the best British colt of his generation in 1953, when he won The Derby and the King George VI & Queen Elizabeth Stakes. He was then retired to stud, where he had little success.

== Background ==
Pinza, a massive bay colt standing over 16 hands was sired by Chanteur out of the mare Pasqua. He was officially bred by the notable trainer Fred Darling, but the mating which produced Pinza was actually arranged by Pasqua's previous owner, Mrs H. E. Morriss, who sent the mare in foal to the Newmarket sales in December 1949. Darling was impressed by Pasqua's pedigree and bought her for 2,000 guineas, acting through a representative as he was out of the country at the time. When Darling saw Pasqua, he was not impressed and sold her at a loss, but not before she had produced the colt foal who was later named Pinza. As a yearling, the colt was sent to the Newmarket Sales where he was bought for 1,500 guineas by the businessman and hotelier Sir Victor Sassoon. Sassoon named the colt after Ezio Pinza after seeing the singer performing in South Pacific on Broadway.

Chanteur (also known as Chanteur II) was a high class stayer who won the Coronation Cup and ran third in the Prix de l'Arc de Triomphe. He was a success at stud, siring the classic winners Cantelo (St Leger Stakes) and Only for Life (2000 Guineas). Apart from Pinza, Pasqua produced only one minor winner.

Pinza was sent into training with Norman Bertie at Newmarket, Suffolk.

== Racing career ==
=== 1952: two-year-old season ===
Pinza made his debut in a maiden race at Hurst Park in July, in which he showed some promise but finished unplaced. He reappeared two months later in a race at the Doncaster St Leger meeting which was restricted to horses sold at the Newmarket Sales, and he won by six lengths. Two weeks later, he was sent to Ascot for the Royal Lodge Stakes and started 2/5 favourite against three opponents. He finished second to the filly Neemah, having been apparently unsuited by the slow pace.

On his final start of the season at Newmarket in October, Pinza won the Dewhurst Stakes by seven lengths. He was given a rating of 128 pounds in the Free Handicap, a ranking of the year's best two-year-olds, five pounds below the top-weight Nearula.

=== 1953: three-year-old season ===
In early 1953, Pinza fell on a gravel path in training. Although the initial injuries sustained were minor, he picked up a leg infection which took a long time to heal so that it was not possible to train him for the 2000 Guineas.

The colt made his first appearance of the year in the Newmarket Stakes in May. He looked to be very big (lacking fitness) before the race but recorded a four length win. As a result of his performance, the bookmakers cut his odds for the Derby from 33/1 to 8/1.

At Epsom, Pinza started 5/1 joint favourite with Premonition in a field of twenty-seven, with Queen Elizabeth's colt Aureole also strongly fancied. The race attracted a huge crowd, including the Queen (in her coronation year) and the Queen Mother. Ridden by the twenty-five times Champion Jockey Gordon Richards, Pinza took the lead early in the straight and went clear inside the last two furlongs to win by four lengths from the Queen's runner, Aureole. Pinza was a popular Derby winner, not only because he was one of the most fancied contenders, but also because he enabled the recently knighted Richards to win the race after 27 previous failures. Richards had already announced that he would retire at the end of the season and that the 1953 Derby would be his final one.

In his next race, Pinza ran against older horses in the third running of the King George VI & Queen Elizabeth Stakes at Ascot, starting the 2/1 favourite in a field of thirteen which included the winners of the Prix de l'Arc de Triomphe (Nuccio) and the Washington, D.C. International Stakes (Worden). He produced what was described as a "brilliant burst of speed" to win by three lengths, again beating Aureole, with Worden third. Pinza was being prepared for a run in the St Leger when he sustained a tendon injury in training. He was unable to race again and was retired to stud at a valuation on £220,000.

== Stud record ==
Pinza was not a particularly successful stallion, but he did sire the winners of 218 races, worth £173,844, including Pindari, winner of the King Edward VII Stakes and £18,456. He died in 1977.

== Assessment and honours ==
In their book A Century of Champions, John Randall and Tony Morris rated Pinza a "great" Derby winner and the fifteenth best British racehorse of the 20th century.

Timeform assessed Pinza at 137, making him the highest-rated European horse of 1953.

Following the London & North Eastern Railway tradition of naming locomotives after winning racehorses, the English Electric 'Deltic' diesel locomotive, no. D9007 (55007) was named after the horse on 22 June 1961 and remained in service until 31 December 1981.

== Pedigree ==
Pedigree of Pinza (GB), bay stallion, 1950
Sire Chanteur (FRA) 1942	Chateau Bouscaut; 1927	Kircubbin	Captivation
Sire Chanteur (FRA) 1942	Chateau Bouscaut; 1927	Kircubbin	Avon Hack
Sire Chanteur (FRA) 1942	Chateau Bouscaut; 1927	Ramondie	Neil Gow
Sire Chanteur (FRA) 1942	Chateau Bouscaut; 1927	Ramondie	La Rille
Sire Chanteur (FRA) 1942	La Diva; 1937	Blue Skies	Blandford*
Sire Chanteur (FRA) 1942	La Diva; 1937	Blue Skies	Blue Pill
Sire Chanteur (FRA) 1942	La Diva; 1937	La Traviata	Alcantara
Sire Chanteur (FRA) 1942	La Diva; 1937	La Traviata	Tregaron
Dam Pasqua (GB) 1939	Donatello; 1934	Blenheim	Blandford*
Dam Pasqua (GB) 1939	Donatello; 1934	Blenheim	Malva
Dam Pasqua (GB) 1939	Donatello; 1934	Delleana	Clarissimus
Dam Pasqua (GB) 1939	Donatello; 1934	Delleana	Duccia di Buoninsegna
Dam Pasqua (GB) 1939	Pasca; 1928	Manna	Phalaris
Dam Pasqua (GB) 1939	Pasca; 1928	Manna	Waffles
Dam Pasqua (GB) 1939	Pasca; 1928	Soubriquet	Lemberg
Dam Pasqua (GB) 1939	Pasca; 1928	Soubriquet	Silver Fowl (Family: 3)

- Pinza was inbred 4 × 4 to Blandford. This means that the stallion appears twice in the fourth generation of his pedigree.
