= Mannamead (horse) =

British-bred Thoroughbred racehorse

- Sire: Manna
- Grandsire: Phalaris
- Dam: Pinprick
- Damsire: Torpoint
- Sex: Stallion
- Foaled: 1929
- Country: United Kingdom
- Colour: Bay
- Breeder: Waldorf Astor, 2nd Viscount Astor
- Owner: Waldorf Astor, 2nd Viscount Astor
- Trainer: Joseph Lawson
- Record: 7:7-0-0
- Earnings: £4,186

Major wins
- Clearwell Stakes (1931); Rous Memorial Stakes (1933)

Awards
- Top-rated British two-year-old (1931)

Mannamead (1929 – after 1946) was an undefeated British Thoroughbred racehorse and sire. He was undefeated in three races in 1931 when he was rated the equal-best two-year-old of the year in Britain. In 1932 he was regarded as a major contender for the British Classic Races but was injured in training and was restricted to one race in late autumn. In 1933 Mannamead was unbeaten in three further races before being retired to stud. He had limited success as a sire of winners in Britain, but had more success after being exported to Hungary. He disappeared during the Soviet occupation of Hungary in 1946.

== Background ==
Mannamead was a bay horse with no white markings bred by his owner Waldorf Astor, 2nd Viscount Astor. He was one of the first crop of foals sired by the 2000 Guineas and Epsom Derby winner Manna. His dam was Pinprick who also produced two influential broodmares: Point Duty was the ancestor of the classic winners Sodium and Ambiguity, while the descendants of So Quick include Black Caviar. Pinprick was a granddaughter of Conjure, a mare which Astor had purchased when he was still a student at Oxford University. The colt was sent into training at Manton in Wiltshire with Joseph Lawson.

== Racing career ==
=== 1931: two-year-old season ===
As a two-year-old, Mannamead did not appear on the racecourse until September, but was undefeated in three races, and was never seriously challenged. He recorded an easy victory on his debut when he won the Malton Plate at York Racecourse. He then started odds-on favourite for the Clearwell Stakes at Newmarket Racecourse and won by four lengths. He ended his season by winning the Autumn Foal Plate at Doncaster by three lengths. In the Free Handicap, a rating of the best two-year-olds, he was given a weight of 133 pounds, making the equal top-rated juvenile of the year, level with his stable companion the unnamed Golden Hair colt.

=== 1932: three-year-old season ===
At the end of February, Mannamead pulled up lame after a training gallop and was ruled out of competing in the British Classic Races. At the time he was the second favourite for the Derby. On his only appearance of the year he won a weight-for-age race at Manchester Racecourse in November by six lengths.

=== 1933: four-year-old season ===
Mannamead returned as a four-year-old and won all three of his races. In spring he won the Chippenham Stakes and the Burwell Stakes over one and a half miles at Newmarket. At Royal Ascot in June he retained his unbeaten record in the Rous Memorial Stakes over one mile. The closing stages of the contest saw Mannamead and his principal rival Loaningdale racing on opposite sides of the course and the racecourse judge declared a dead heat. Despite the performances of the three-year-old Hyperion, Mannamead was described as "the best horse in training" in mid 1933. He was to be aimed at the Champion Stakes in autumn but the prevailing firm ground made him difficult to train and he was retired from racing.

== Stud record ==
Mannamead was retired from racing to become a breeding stallion, starting his stud career at a fee of £98. He made little impression as a sire of winners in Britain, with the best of his progeny being the Chester Vase winner Cave Man. He was sold and exported to Hungary in 1937. Mannamead was an immediate success in his new country and was champion sire with his first crop of foals. He disappeared during the Soviet occupation of Hungary which followed the Second World War.

== Pedigree ==
Pedigree of Mannamead (GB), bay stallion, 1929
Sire Manna (GB) 1922	Phalaris (GB); 1913	Polymelus	Cyllene
Sire Manna (GB) 1922	Phalaris (GB); 1913	Polymelus	Maid Marion
Sire Manna (GB) 1922	Phalaris (GB); 1913	Bromus	Sainfoin
Sire Manna (GB) 1922	Phalaris (GB); 1913	Bromus	Cheery
Sire Manna (GB) 1922	Waffles (IRE); 1917	Buckwheat	Martagon
Sire Manna (GB) 1922	Waffles (IRE); 1917	Buckwheat	Sesmame
Sire Manna (GB) 1922	Waffles (IRE); 1917	Lady Mischief	St. Simon*
Sire Manna (GB) 1922	Waffles (IRE); 1917	Lady Mischief	Vain Duchess
Dam Pinprick (GB) 1917	Torpoint (GB); 1900	Trenton	Musket
Dam Pinprick (GB) 1917	Torpoint (GB); 1900	Trenton	Frailty
Dam Pinprick (GB) 1917	Torpoint (GB); 1900	Doncaster Beauty	Sheen
Dam Pinprick (GB) 1917	Torpoint (GB); 1900	Doncaster Beauty	Doncaster Belle
Dam Pinprick (GB) 1917	Third Trick; 1906	William the Third	St. Simon*
Dam Pinprick (GB) 1917	Third Trick; 1906	William the Third	Gravity
Dam Pinprick (GB) 1917	Third Trick; 1906	Conjure	Juggler
Dam Pinprick (GB) 1917	Third Trick; 1906	Conjure	Connie (Family:1-p)

- Mannamead was inbred 4x4 to St. Simon, meaning that this stallion appears twice fourth generations of his pedigree.

== See also ==
- List of leading Thoroughbred racehorses
