= Scottish Union =

British Thoroughbred racehorse

- Sire: Cameronian
- Grandsire: Pharos
- Dam: Trustful
- Damsire: Bachelor's Double
- Sex: Stallion
- Foaled: 1935
- Country: United Kingdom
- Colour: Bay
- Breeder: Sledmere Stud
- Owner: James V. Rank
- Trainer: Noel Cannon
- Record: 13: 6-3-1
- Earnings: £21,567

Major wins
- Rouse Memorial Stakes (1937); Middle Park Stakes (1937); St James's Palace Stakes (1938); St Leger Stakes (1938); Burwell Stakes (1939); Coronation Cup (1939)

Scottish Union (1935–1954) was a British Thoroughbred racehorse and stallion best known for winning the classic St Leger Stakes in 1938. He was one of the highest-rated British two-year-olds in 1937, when his wins included the Middle Park Stakes at Newmarket Racecourse. In the following year he ran prominently in all three legs of the Triple Crown, finishing second in the 2000 Guineas and The Derby before his win in the Leger. As a four-year-old he won the Coronation Cup but appeared beaten for stamina in the Ascot Gold Cup before being retired to stud where his record was moderate. He died at the age of nineteen in 1954.

== Background ==
Scottish Union was a bay horse with a small white star bred by the Sledmere Stud of Driffield, East Yorkshire. He was from the first crop of foals sired by Cameronian, the winner of the 2000 Guineas and the Epsom Derby in 1931. Cameronian's subsequent stud career was disappointing and he was eventually sold and exported to Argentina. Scottish Union's dam Trustful won two races and produced fourteen winners including the July Cup winner Coroado. Her more remote descendants included Roland Gardens and Kooyonga.

As a yearling, Scottish Union was offered for sale and bought for 3,000 guineas by James Voase Rank, the son of Joseph Rank and older brother of the film-maker J. Arthur Rank. The colt was sent into training with Noel Cannon at the Druid's Lodge stable near Salisbury in Wiltshire. Cannon was a member of a well-known racing family, being a cousin of the jockeys Mornington and Kempton Cannon.

== Racing career ==
=== 1937: two-year-old season ===
Scottish Union raced three times as a two-year-old in 1937. On his debut he was beaten at Salisbury Racecourse, but then won a Rous Memorial Stakes at Goodwood in July. The colt was then rested until the autumn, returning in October to contest the Middle Park Stakes over six furlongs at Newmarket. Ridden by Gordon Richards he started at odds of 10/1 with the Aga Khan's Mirza, previously successful in five races including the Coventry Stakes and the July Stakes being made favourite. Richards tracked the favourite, before moving Scottish Union forward to take the lead inside the final furlong to win by a head. In the Free Handicap, a ranking of the season's best British juveniles, Scottish Union was assigned a weight of 132 pounds, one pound below the top-rated Portmarnock.

=== 1938: three-year-old season ===
Scottish Union began his three-year-old season in the 2000 Guineas over the Rowley Mile course on 27 April. He was well-fancied for the race but was beaten two lengths into second by the favourite Pasch who was ridden by Richards. Scottish Union was then moved up in distance to contest the Derby over 1 1/2 miles at Epsom Downs Racecourse. Scottish Union led in the straight and successfully held off a challenge from Pasch, but was overtaken inside the final furlong and beaten four lengths by the recently imported French colt Bois Roussel. On his next appearance Scottish Union returned to the one mile distance to win the St James's Palace Stakes at Royal Ascot at odds of 4/7 ridden by the Australian jockey Bernard "Brownie" Carslake. He then ran disappointingly when fourth behind Pasch in the Eclipse Stakes.

Scottish Union and Pasch met for the fourth time when they were two of the nine runners for the St Leger Stakes over 14 1/2 furlongs at Doncaster on 7 September. The Guineas winner was made favourite, with Scottish Union, ridden again by the fifty-year-old Carslake starting at odds of 7/1, after being considered a doubtful participant until ten days before the race. In what was described as a "fighting finish" Scottish Union won the classic by a neck from Challenge, with Pasch four lengths back in third.

=== 1939: four-year-old season ===
Scottish Union was kept in training as a four-year-old with the Ascot Gold Cup as his principal objective. In spring at Newmarket he finished second in the Chippenham Stakes and then won the Burwell Stakes by twenty lengths on 9 May. At the Epsom Derby meeting he won the Coronation Cup by six lengths, ridden by Richards. In the Gold Cup he started favourite but fought against Carslake's efforts to restrain him and although he led for much of the way he tired in the closing stages of the two and a half mile race and finished third to Flyon. There was some criticism of Carlslake's performance but others, including the leading trainer George Lambton, argued that Scottish Union simply did not stay the extreme distance. He ran poorly behind Blue Peter in the Eclipse Stakes and did not race in autumn as racing in England was suspended following the outbreak of the Second World War.

== Assessment ==
In their book A Century of Champions, based on a modified version of the Timeform system, John Randall and Tony Morris rated Scottish Union as an "inferior" St Leger winner.

== Stud career ==
Scottish Union was retired from racing to become a breeding stallion. Although he sired the winners of more than 250 flat-race winners few of them were of any real consequence and he was considered a disappointment at stud. The most notable of his offspring was the gelding National Spirit, winner of the Champion Hurdle in 1947 and 1948. Scottish Union was eventually exported to Ireland where he died in 1954.

== Pedigree ==
Pedigree of Scottish Union (GB), bay stallion, 1935
Sire Cameronian (GB) 1928	Pharos (GB); 1920	Phalaris	Polymelus
Sire Cameronian (GB) 1928	Pharos (GB); 1920	Phalaris	Bromus
Sire Cameronian (GB) 1928	Pharos (GB); 1920	Scapa Flow	Chaucer
Sire Cameronian (GB) 1928	Pharos (GB); 1920	Scapa Flow	Anchora
Sire Cameronian (GB) 1928	Una Cameron (GB); 1922	Gainsborough	Bayardo
Sire Cameronian (GB) 1928	Una Cameron (GB); 1922	Gainsborough	Rosedrop
Sire Cameronian (GB) 1928	Una Cameron (GB); 1922	Cherimoya	Cherry Tree
Sire Cameronian (GB) 1928	Una Cameron (GB); 1922	Cherimoya	Svelte
Dam Trustful (IRE) 1924	Bachelor's Double (GB); 1906	Tredennis	Kendal
Dam Trustful (IRE) 1924	Bachelor's Double (GB); 1906	Tredennis	St Marguerite
Dam Trustful (IRE) 1924	Bachelor's Double (GB); 1906	Lady Bawn	Le Noir
Dam Trustful (IRE) 1924	Bachelor's Double (GB); 1906	Lady Bawn	Milady
Dam Trustful (IRE) 1924	Credenda (IRE); 1915	Cellini	Cyllene
Dam Trustful (IRE) 1924	Credenda (IRE); 1915	Cellini	Sirenia
Dam Trustful (IRE) 1924	Credenda (IRE); 1915	Ballyglass	Desmond
Dam Trustful (IRE) 1924	Credenda (IRE); 1915	Ballyglass	Rosalind (Family: 19)
