= Neasham Belle =

British-bred Thoroughbred racehorse

- Sire: Nearco
- Grandsire: Pharos
- Dam: Phase
- Damsire: Windsor Lad
- Sex: Mare
- Foaled: 1948
- Country: United Kingdom
- Colour: Bay
- Breeder: Major Lionel Brook Holliday
- Owner: Lionel Holliday
- Trainer: Geoffrey Brooke
- Record: 7: 2-0-1

Major wins
- Oaks Stakes (1951)

Neasham Belle (1948 – November 1971) was a British Thoroughbred racehorse and broodmare best known for winning the classic Oaks Stakes in 1951. After winning one minor race as a two-year-old, she was well-beaten in her first two races in 1951 before recording an upset win in the Oaks. She was beaten in her only subsequent race and was retired to stud, where she made little impact as a broodmare.

== Background ==
Neasham Belle was a bay mare with no white markings bred by her owner, Major Lionel Brook Holliday. She was sired by the Italian stallion Nearco, one of the most important sires of the 20th century. Her dam, Phase, also produced the successful racehorse and sire Narrator, and was the female-line ancestor of Hethersett.

Holliday sent his filly into training with Major Geoffrey Brooke at his Clarehaven Stables near Newmarket.

== Racing career ==
=== 1950: two-year-old season ===
Neasham Belle ran three times as a two-year-old in 1950 winning one minor race at Doncaster Racecourse. She started favourite for the Windsor Castle Stakes at Royal Ascot but ran poorly.

=== 1951: three-year-old season ===
On her three-year-old debut, Neasham Belle finished unplaced behind Belle of All in 1000 Guineas over the Rowley Mile course at Newmarket. The filly was then moved up in distance for the Lingfield Oaks Trial over one and a half miles. She finished third, beaten a neck and three lengths by Chinese Cracker and Sea Parrot.

On 1 June Neasham Belle was one of sixteen fillies to contest the Oaks over one and a half miles at Epsom. The race attracted a crowd estimated at 100,000 which included the future Queen Elizabeth II. She was given little chance and started at odds of 33/1. Ridden by Stan Clayton she won the classic by four lengths from Chinese Cracker, with Belle of All two lengths back in third.

On her only subsequent appearance, Neasham Belle finished unplaced behind Sea Parrot in the Yorkshire Oaks in August.

== Assessment ==
In their book A Century of Champions, based on a modified version of the Timeform system John Randall and Tony Morris rated Neasham Belle an “average” winner of the Oaks.

== Stud career ==
Neasham Belle was retired to stud where she produced two minor winners- Magnifier, sired by Mark-Ye-Well and First Grey, by Roan Rocket. She died in November 1971.

== Pedigree ==
Pedigree of Neasham Belle, bay mare, 1948
Sire Nearco (ITY) 1935	Pharos (GB); 1920	Phalaris	Polymelus
Sire Nearco (ITY) 1935	Pharos (GB); 1920	Phalaris	Bromus
Sire Nearco (ITY) 1935	Pharos (GB); 1920	Scapa Flow	Chaucer
Sire Nearco (ITY) 1935	Pharos (GB); 1920	Scapa Flow	Anchora
Sire Nearco (ITY) 1935	Nogara (ITY); 1928	Havresac	Rabelais
Sire Nearco (ITY) 1935	Nogara (ITY); 1928	Havresac	Hors Concours
Sire Nearco (ITY) 1935	Nogara (ITY); 1928	Catnip	Spearmint
Sire Nearco (ITY) 1935	Nogara (ITY); 1928	Catnip	Sibola
Dam Phase (GB) 1939	Windsor Lad (GB); 1931	Blandford	Swynford
Dam Phase (GB) 1939	Windsor Lad (GB); 1931	Blandford	Blanche
Dam Phase (GB) 1939	Windsor Lad (GB); 1931	Resplendent	By George
Dam Phase (GB) 1939	Windsor Lad (GB); 1931	Resplendent	Sunbridge
Dam Phase (GB) 1939	Lost Soul (GB); 1931	Solario	Gainsborough
Dam Phase (GB) 1939	Lost Soul (GB); 1931	Solario	Sun Worship
Dam Phase (GB) 1939	Lost Soul (GB); 1931	Orlass	Orby
Dam Phase (GB) 1939	Lost Soul (GB); 1931	Orlass	Simon Lass (Family 21-a)
