= Belle of All =

Irish-bred Thoroughbred racehorse

- Sire: Nasrullah
- Grandsire: Nearco
- Dam: Village Beauty
- Damsire: Winalot
- Sex: Mare
- Foaled: 1948
- Country: Ireland
- Colour: Bay
- Breeder: Earl of Dunraven
- Owner: Henry Hastings Sackville Thanet Tufton, 3rd Baron Hothfield
- Trainer: Norman Bertie
- Record: 6: 4-0-1
- Earnings: £25,558

Major wins
- National Stakes (1950); Cheveley Park Stakes (1950); 1000 Guineas (1951); Coronation Stakes (1951)

Awards
- Top-rated British two-year-old filly (1950); Timeform rating 125

Belle of All (1948–November 1971) was a British Thoroughbred racehorse and broodmare who won the classic 1000 Guineas in 1951. In a racing career lasting from the spring of 1950 until July 1951, the filly ran six times and won four races. Belle of All won both her races as a two-year-old, beating a strong field in the National Stakes at Sandown Park and winning the Cheveley Park Stakes at Newmarket Racecourse in autumn. She won the 1000 Guineas on the first appearance of 1951 and added the Coronation Stakes at Royal Ascot in June. Her only career defeats came when she was tried over longer distances in The Oaks and King George VI and Queen Elizabeth Stakes. She was retired from racing at the end of the season and had some influence as a broodmare.

== Background ==
Belle of All was a bay mare bred in Ireland by the Earl of Dunraven. She came from the fourth crop of foals sired by Nasrullah, a talented but temperamental racehorse who became a highly successful breeding stallion, especially following his export to the United States in 1950. He was the British champion sire in 1951 and the North American champion on five occasions. Belle of All's dam, Village Beauty, was unraced, but proved to be a successful broodmare whose other progeny included the Stewards' Cup winner Sugar Bowl.

As a yearling, Belle of All was sent to the sales at Doncaster where she was sold for 8,000 guineas to Henry Thanet Tufton (later Lord Hothfield). The filly was sent into training with Norman Bertie at his Bedford Cottage stable at Newmarket, Suffolk.

== Racing career ==
=== 1950: two-year-old season ===
Belle of All made her debut at Sandown Park in May 1950 when she won the National Breeders' Produce Stakes over five furlongs. The runner-up was the colt Royal Serenade who went on to win two runnings of the Nunthorpe Stakes before being exported to the United States where he won the Hollywood Gold Cup in 1953. Third place went to Grey Sovereign, who won the Richmond Stakes at Goodwood and went on to be a highly successful breeding stallion.

Belle of All did not run again until the end of September, when she was sent to Newmarket for the Cheveley Park Stakes, Britain's most prestigious race for two-year-old fillies. Ridden by the champion jockey Gordon Richards she won at odds of 5/4.

In the Free Handicap, a rating of the best British and Irish two-year-olds, Belle of All was ranked equal with the Lowther Stakes winner Gamble in Gold as the best filly, eight pounds below the leading colt Big Dipper.

=== 1951: three-year-old season ===
On her three-year-old debut, Belle of All was sent straight to Newmarket for the 1000 Guineas without running in a trial race. Ridden again by Richards, she started the 4/1 favourite in a field of eighteen fillies despite becoming highly agitated in the paddock before the race. She won by a neck from Subtle Difference, with Bob Run two lengths back in second.

A month after her classic win, Belle of All was moved up in distance to contest the Oaks over one and a half miles at Epsom. The race attracted a crowd estimated at 100,000 which included the future Queen Elizabeth II. She started joint favourite for the race but apparently failed to stay the distance as she ran third to Neasham Belle and Chinese Cracker, finishing six lengths behind the winner. At Royal Ascot she returned to one mile for the Coronation Stakes and won by five lengths from Djebellica, a French filly who won the Irish Oaks on her next appearance.

In July, Belle of All was part of the international field which assembled for the inaugural running of the King George VI and Queen Elizabeth Stakes, the most valuable race ever run in Britain. As in the Oaks, Belle of All failed to show her best form over the mile and a half distance and after being among the early leaders she faded to finish fourteenth of the nineteen runners behind Supreme Court.

== Assessment and honours ==
The independent Timeform organisation gave Belle of All a rating of 125.

In their book, A Century of Champions, based on the Timeform rating system, John Randall and Tony Morris rated Belle of All an "average" winner of the 1000 Guineas.

== Retirement ==
Belle of All produced several winners at stud, but none were of top class. The best of her offspring was Principal Boy who won four races including the News of the World Stakes, a valuable ten furlong race at Goodwood. Her son Pendragon never won a race but became a successful National Hunt stallion, siring Pendil who won the King George VI Chase in 1972 and 1973. Through her daughter Alor Star, Belle of All was the direct female ancestor of the King George VI and Queen Elizabeth Stakes winner Ela-Mana-Mou. Belle of All died in November 1971.

== Pedigree ==
Pedigree of Belle of All (IRE), bay mare, 1948
Sire Nasrullah (GB) 1940	Nearco (ITY); 1935	Pharos	Phalaris
Sire Nasrullah (GB) 1940	Nearco (ITY); 1935	Pharos	Scapa Flow
Sire Nasrullah (GB) 1940	Nearco (ITY); 1935	Nogara	Havresac
Sire Nasrullah (GB) 1940	Nearco (ITY); 1935	Nogara	Catnip
Sire Nasrullah (GB) 1940	Mumtaz Begum (FR); 1932	Blenheim	Blandford
Sire Nasrullah (GB) 1940	Mumtaz Begum (FR); 1932	Blenheim	Malva
Sire Nasrullah (GB) 1940	Mumtaz Begum (FR); 1932	Mumtaz Mahal	The Tetrarch
Sire Nasrullah (GB) 1940	Mumtaz Begum (FR); 1932	Mumtaz Mahal	Lady Josephine
Dam Village Beauty (GB) 1937	Winalot (GB); 1921	Son-In-Law	Dark Ronald
Dam Village Beauty (GB) 1937	Winalot (GB); 1921	Son-In-Law	Mother-in-Law
Dam Village Beauty (GB) 1937	Winalot (GB); 1921	Gallenza	Gallinule
Dam Village Beauty (GB) 1937	Winalot (GB); 1921	Gallenza	Excellenza
Dam Village Beauty (GB) 1937	Village Green (GB); 1929	Phalaris	Polymelus
Dam Village Beauty (GB) 1937	Village Green (GB); 1929	Phalaris	Bromus
Dam Village Beauty (GB) 1937	Village Green (GB); 1929	Sweet Auburn	Sunstar
Dam Village Beauty (GB) 1937	Village Green (GB); 1929	Sweet Auburn	Russet (Family 3-g)
