= Sandwich (horse) =

British-bred Thoroughbred racehorse

- Sire: Sansovino
- Grandsire: Swynford
- Dam: Waffles
- Damsire: Buckwheat
- Sex: Stallion
- Foaled: 1928
- Died: unknown
- Country: Great Britain
- Colour: Bay
- Breeder: James J. Maher
- Owner: Archibald Primrose, 5th Earl of Rosebery; Harry Primrose, 6th Earl of Rosebery
- Trainer: Jack Jarvis
- Jockey: Harry Wragg
- Record: 16: 4 ? ?
- Earnings: £17,019

Major wins
- Chester Vase (1931); King Edward VII Stakes (1931); St Leger (1931)

Sandwich (1928 – after 1941) was a British Thoroughbred racehorse that won the classic St Leger Stakes at Doncaster Racecourse in 1931, for owner Earl of Rosebery. By 1931, Archibald Primrose, 5th Earl of Rosebery had died, making this a win for his son, Harry Primrose, 6th Earl of Rosebery. Sandwich was a half-brother to Manna, winner of the 1925 Epsom Derby, and as well as his 1931 St Leger success also won the Chester Vase and King Edward VII Stakes.

== Background ==
Sandwich was a bay stallion, bred in Great Britain by the Irish breeder, James J. Maher. He was sired by the 1924 Epsom Derby winner, Sansovino. His dam Waffles was unraced but had previously produced the Derby winner Manna. As a yearling, he was purchased by Lord Rosebery for 3,600 guineas and was sent to trainer Jack Jarvis.

== Racing career ==
=== Training ===
As part of the Rosebery stable, Sandwich was trained by Jack Jarvis. Jarvis was noted for being the first trainer to be knighted for his service and contribution to horse racing. Jarvis' reputation for training horses was to work them hard, and he found success with his approach.

==== Racing ====
Sandwich was slow to mature and after finishing unplaced in his only races as a juvenile in 1930 he was well beaten in both the Craven Stakes and the 2000 Guineas the following spring. When moved up in distance he showed immediate improvement: in May, ridden by Billy Nevett, he won the Chester Vase, a major trial race for the Epsom Derby.

In June Sandwich, ridden by Harry Wragg he started at odds of 8/1 for the Derby. After being hampered early in the race and losing his position he finished strongly to take third behind Cameronian and Orpen. Jarvis said that the colt was "beaten by the bad draw". Later that month he won the King Edward VII Stakes at Royal Ascot at odds of 1/3. When matched against older horses for the first time in the Eclipse Stakes he finished third behind the 25/1 outsider Caerleon.

The St. Leger race is the oldest of the five British Classic races, the last in the year to be run, and it is also the longest. In this race in 1931, Sandwich was again ridden by Wragg, nicknamed "The Head Waiter." Sandwich's win in the St Leger was considered by some to be an upset as he bested the favorite, Cameronian, who was at the time making a run at the final leg of the British Triple Crown. Cameronian finished last in the field.

Sandwich remained in training as a four-year-old and was expected to be a leading contender in the "Cup races" (major weight-for-age staying events). He failed to live up to expectations but did win The Whip at Newmarket Racecourse and finished third under a weight of 131 pounds in the Cesarewitch.

== Stud record ==
At the end of his racing career, Sandwich was retired to stud but was a complete failure as a breeding stallion. He was sold and exported to Brazil in 1941.

== Namesake ==
The London & North Eastern Railway A3 class locomotive 2504 was named after the horse. Built at Doncaster Works in September 1934, it was withdrawn by British Rail in March 1963.

== Pedigree ==
Pedigree of Sandwich (GB), brown stallion, 1928
Sire Sansovino (GB) br. 1921	Swynford (GB) dkb. 1907	John O'Gaunt (GB); 1901	Isinglass* (GB)
Sire Sansovino (GB) br. 1921	Swynford (GB) dkb. 1907	John O'Gaunt (GB); 1901	La Fleche* (GB)
Sire Sansovino (GB) br. 1921	Swynford (GB) dkb. 1907	Canterbury Pilgrim (GB); 1893	Tristan (GB)
Sire Sansovino (GB) br. 1921	Swynford (GB) dkb. 1907	Canterbury Pilgrim (GB); 1893	Pilgrimage* (GB)
Sire Sansovino (GB) br. 1921	Gondolette (GB) br. 1902	Loved One (GB); 1883	See Saw (GB)
Sire Sansovino (GB) br. 1921	Gondolette (GB) br. 1902	Loved One (GB); 1883	Pilgrimage* (GB)
Sire Sansovino (GB) br. 1921	Gondolette (GB) br. 1902	Dongola (GB); 1883	Doncaster (GB)
Sire Sansovino (GB) br. 1921	Gondolette (GB) br. 1902	Dongola (GB); 1883	Douranee (GB)
Dam Waffles (IRE) br. 1917	Buckwheat (GB) br. 1906	Martagon (GB); 1887	Bend Or (GB)
Dam Waffles (IRE) br. 1917	Buckwheat (GB) br. 1906	Martagon (GB); 1887	Tiger Lily (GB)
Dam Waffles (IRE) br. 1917	Buckwheat (GB) br. 1906	Sesame (GB); 1900	St Simon* (GB)
Dam Waffles (IRE) br. 1917	Buckwheat (GB) br. 1906	Sesame (GB); 1900	Maize (GB)
Dam Waffles (IRE) br. 1917	Lady Mischief (GB) br. 1903	St Simon* (GB); 1881	Galopin* (GB)
Dam Waffles (IRE) br. 1917	Lady Mischief (GB) br. 1903	St Simon* (GB); 1881	St Angela* (GB)
Dam Waffles (IRE) br. 1917	Lady Mischief (GB) br. 1903	Vain Duchess (GB); 1897	Isinglass*
Dam Waffles (IRE) br. 1917	Lady Mischief (GB) br. 1903	Vain Duchess (GB); 1897	Sweet Duchess (GB)

* Sandwich is inbred 5S x 4D x 3D to the stallion St Simon, meaning that he appears fifth generation (via La Fleche) on the sire side of his pedigree, and fourth generation and third generation on the dam side of his pedigree.

* Sandwich is inbred 4S x 4S to the mare Pilgrimage, meaning that she appears fourth generation twice on the sire side of his pedigree.

* Sandwich is inbred 4S x 4D to the stallion Isinglass, meaning that he appears fourth generation on the sire side of his pedigree, and fourth generation on the dam side of his pedigree.
