= Freddie Fox (jockey) =

British jockey

Frederick "Freddie" Fox
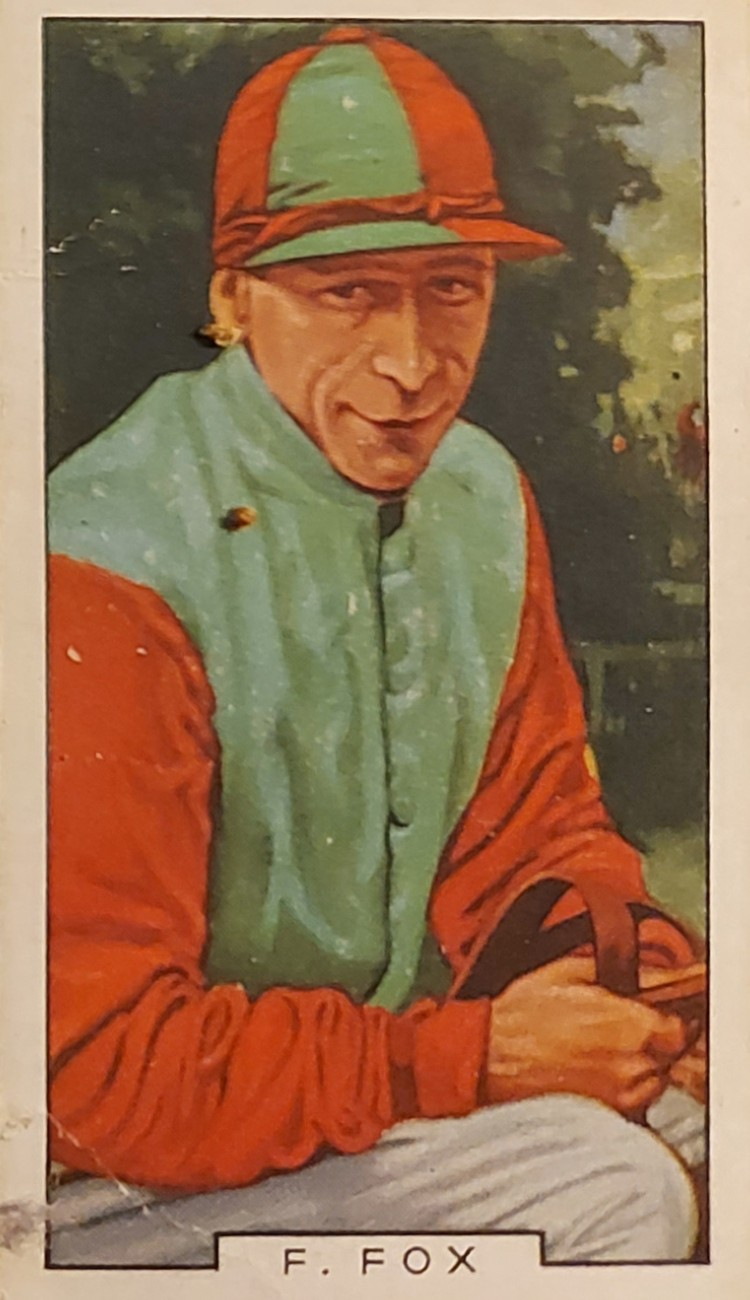
- Freddie Fox, in the colours of Captain A.S.Will (Gallaher's cigarette card, 1936)

Personal information
- Born: 1888 Berrington, Shropshire, England
- Died: 12 December 1945 (aged 56–57) Frilford, Abingdon, Berkshire, England
- Occupation: Jockey

Horse racing career
- Sport: Horse racing

Major racing wins
- British Classic Race wins as jockey: 1,000 Guineas (1911); 2,000 Guineas (1930, 1935); Derby (1931, 1935); St Leger Stakes (1932)

Racing awards
- British flat racing Champion Jockey (1930)

Significant horses
- Bahram

Frederick Sidney Fox (1888–12 December 1945), referred to in his retirement as "The Mayor of Wantage" was a British horse racing jockey. He was a British Classic winner in his early twenties, but it was not until the last quarter of his thirty-year career that he had his greatest successes. He became the British flat racing Champion Jockey in 1930, making him one of only three jockeys to interrupt Gordon Richards' three decade run as champion and won two Derbies on Cameronian in 1931 and Bahram in 1935. He narrowly missed out on the British Triple Crown. He was ranked the 20th best jockey of the 20th century by Britain's industry paper, the Racing Post.

== Career ==
Fox was born, youngest son of "Mr. and Mrs. L. Fox" at Great Ryton, Shropshire, England (although he gave Berrington, Shropshire as his birthplace in the 1911 Census)) He grew up at nearby Dorrington where he was educated at the village school and was a choirboy in its church, until moving at age 12 in 1900 to live with his eldest brother at Kingsland, Herefordshire. He joined Pratt's Stables at Letcombe Regis, then in Berkshire and became an apprentice at the age of eighteen, and had his first winner a year later. In 1911, he had his first Classic winner, taking the 1,000 Guineas on James de Rothschild's filly Atmah. He then took some time out to go to Germany where he spent two seasons riding for the von Weinberg stable, but returned to England prior to World War I.

He spent the next decade or more as a journeyman jockey. He was not to win another classic until he was in his forties, and his career at this time was punctuated by only the occasional big race success, such as Irish Elegance in the 1918 July Cup.

Things began to change by the end of the 1920s, and in 1930 he was involved in a neck-and-neck battle with reigning champion Gordon Richards for the Jockeys' Championship. The battle went down to the last day of the season, when Fox rode two winners to Richards' one to win the title 129 winners to 128. He added a further Classic in 1930, winning the 2000 Guineas on Diolite, followed by the 1932 St Leger on Firdaussi.

In 1934, now towards the end of his career, he formed his most famous partnership with Bahram, owned by the Aga Khan, and trained by Frank Butters. On Bahram, he won the 2,000 Guineas and the Derby "comfortably" and then, at odds of 1/8, he won the St. James's Palace Stakes at Royal Ascot. With the 2,000 Guineas and Derby won, and Bahram in form, an attempt on the Triple Crown in the St. Leger was a clear possibility. Bahram was set to go off a strong favourite for the race. However, the day before the race, Fox was seriously injured in a fall and the ride taken by Charlie Smirke. In the event, Bahram won "an easy victory" by 3 lengths, meaning Fox had narrowly been denied one of the rarest achievements in racing. Fox retired to Letcombe Regis, near Wantage in 1936, having given up on an initial plan to train. His successes for the Aga Khan were said to be what he would always be remembered for.

== Personality and riding style ==
Fox was a naturally lightweight jockey. On his retirement in 1936 he was still able to meet a riding weight of 7 stone 7 lbs (47.6 kg). In appearance, he is said to have "resembled his vulpine namesake."

He was a lot more measured than some of his contemporaries and was a popular figure in the weighing room. Maxims attributed to him include, "Be quiet, respect your elders, don't get cocky" and "Remember, however good you are, there's always someone better."

== Later life ==
In later life, Fox was known in racing circles as "the Mayor of Wantage", due to the "country gentleman" lifestyle he adopted.

On 12 December 1945 Fox was killed in a road accident at Frilford near Abingdon, his wife Norah Kathleen was injured. Their only son Michael was a pilot in the Royal Air Force who was killed 15 July 1940 on active service during World War II in Egypt aged 21.

== Major Wins ==
(United Kingdom) Great Britain

=== Classic Races ===
- 1,000 Guineas - Atmah (1911)
- 2,000 Guineas - (2) - Diolite (1930), Bahram (1935)
- Derby - (2) - Cameronian (1931), Bahram (1935)
- St. Leger - Firdaussi (1932)

=== Other selected races ===
- Cesarewitch Handicap - Noble Star (1931)
- Champion Stakes - Umidwar (1934)
- Jockey Club Cup - Noble Star (1931)
- Jockey Club Stakes - Umidwar (1934)
- July Cup - (2) - Irish Elegance (1918), Tiffin (1929)
- Middle Park Stakes - Press Gang (1929)

== Bibliography ==
- Tanner, Michael; Cranham, Gerry (1992). Great Jockeys of the Flat. Enfield, Middlesex: Guinness Publishing. ISBN 0-85112-989-7.
