= Fred Darling =

English racehorse trainer (1884–1953)

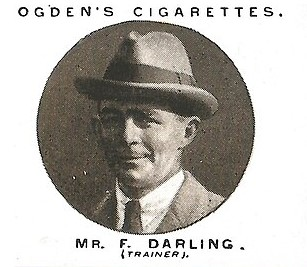

Personal information
- Born: 15 May 1884 United Kingdom
- Died: 9 June 1953 (aged 69)
- Occupation: Trainer

Horse racing career
- Sport: Horse racing

Major racing wins
- British Classic Race wins as trainer: 2000 Guineas (5); 1000 Guineas (2); Epsom Derby (7); Epsom Oaks (2); St Leger (3)

Racing awards
- British flat racing Champion Trainer (1926, 1933, 1940, 1941, 1942, 1947)

Honours
- Fred Darling Stakes at Newbury Racecourse

Significant horses
- Hurry On, Captain Cuttle, Manna, Coronach, Cameronian, Bois Roussel, Pont l'Eveque, Owen Tudor, Big Game, Sun Chariot, Tudor Minstrel

Frederick Darling (1884–1953) was a British Thoroughbred racehorse trainer who trained a record-equalling seven English Derby winners.

Darling's father, Sam Darling senior, was a trainer at Beckhampton, near Avebury in Wiltshire, who trained two Derby winners himself. Fred initially started training National Hunt racehorses for Lady de Bathe at Kentford near Newmarket, and then went to train in Germany. He returned to Britain in 1913 to take over the Beckhampton stables when his father retired, and continued to train there until his own retirement in 1947. In 1928 he bought Billy Higgs' stud at Blackland or Blacklands, a few miles west of Beckhampton. Darling was succeeded as trainer at Beckhampton by Noel Murless.

Amongst his most successful horses were Hurry On, the unbeaten St. Leger winner of 1916; Sun Chariot who won three British Classic Races in 1942; and Tudor Minstrel, the 2,000 Guineas winner of 1947. From 1932 until his retirement Darling's stable jockey was Gordon Richards.

He is commemorated by the Fred Darling Stakes, run at Newbury Racecourse.

Fred Darling was Champion Trainer six times: in 1926, 1933, 1940, 1941, 1942 and 1947. As well as a trainer, he was a breeder of thoroughbreds and bred Pinza, who won the Derby in 1953.

He trained the winners of 19 English Classic Races, as follows;

2,000 Guineas (5)

- Manna (1925), Cameronian (1931), Pasch (1938), Big Game (1942), Tudor Minstrel (1947)

1,000 Guineas (2)

- Four Course (1931), Sun Chariot (1942)

Epsom Derby (7)

- Captain Cuttle (1922), Manna (1925), Coronach (1926), Cameronian (1931), Bois Roussel (1938), Pont l'Eveque (1940), Owen Tudor (1941)

Epsom Oaks (2)

- Commotion (1941), Sun Chariot (1942)

St. Leger Stakes (3)

- Hurry On (1916), Coronach (1926), Sun Chariot (1942)
