= Sam Darling (jockey, born 1852) =

British racehorse trainer (1852–1921)

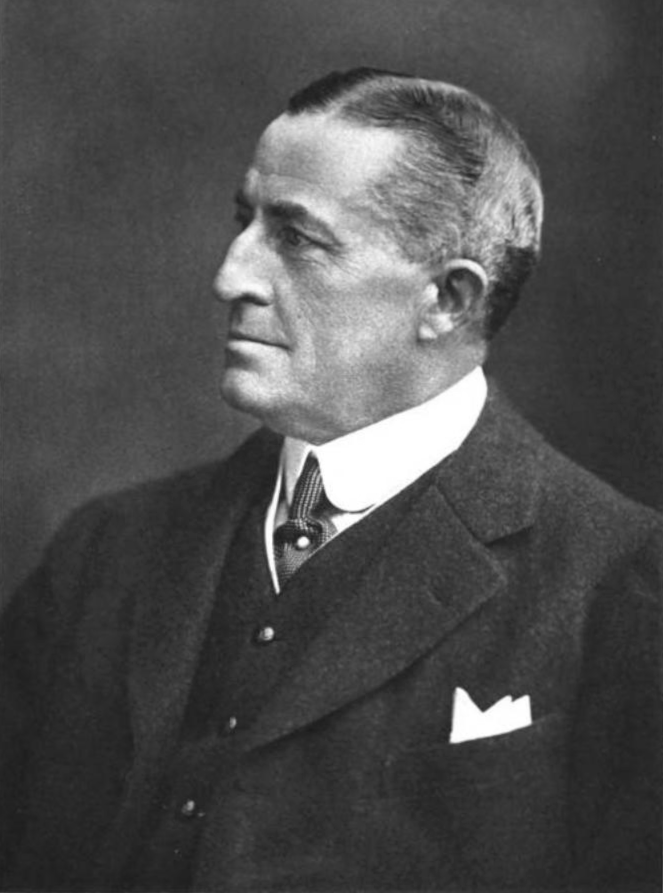

Personal information
- Born: 11 March 1852 Moreton-in-Marsh, United Kingdom
- Died: 16 May 1921 (aged 69) Avebury, United Kingdom
- Occupation: Trainer
- Children: Grace Darling, Samuel Henry Darling (Sam Darling Jnr), Frederick Darling

Horse racing career
- Sport: Horse racing

Signature
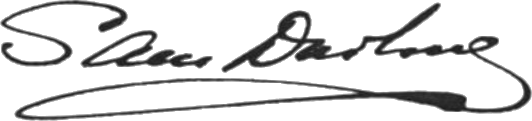

Sam Darling (11 March 1852 – 16 May 1921) was a British racehorse trainer. He was a trainer at Beckhampton, Wiltshire and trained two Derby winners, Galtee More and Ard Patrick. He wrote an autobiography titled Sam Darling's Reminiscences.

== Biography ==
Sam Darling was born at Bourton Hill, Moreton-in-Marsh on 11 March 1852.

He died in Avebury on 16 May 1921.

His son Fred (1884–1953) took over his stables and had further success.

== Publications ==
- Sam Darling's Reminiscences. London: Mills & Boon. 1914 – via Google Books.
