= Cameronian (horse) =

British-bred Thoroughbred racehorse

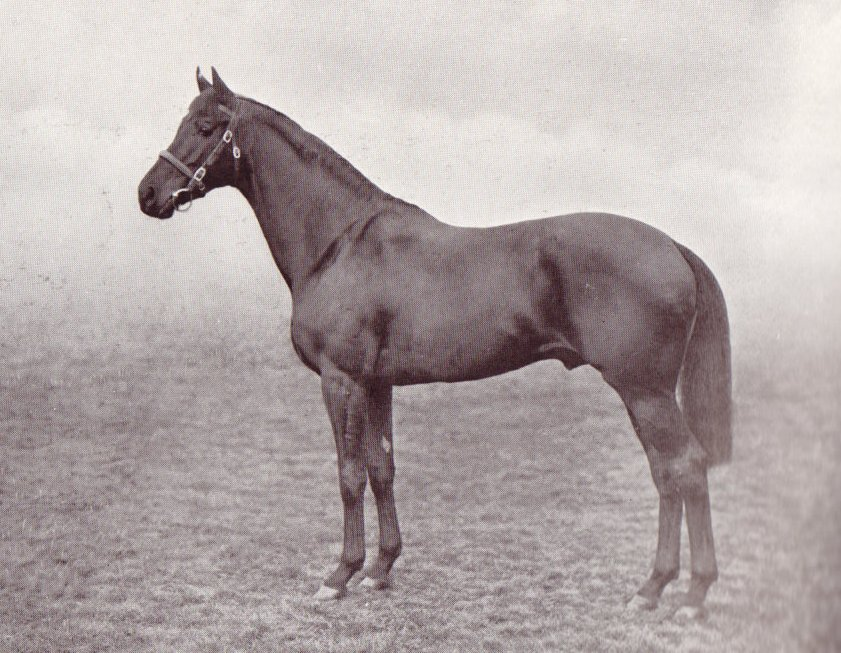
- Cameronian in a photo by Frank Griggs.
- Sire: Pharos
- Grandsire: Phalaris
- Dam: Una Cameron
- Damsire: Gainsborough
- Sex: Stallion
- Foaled: 1928
- Country: United Kingdom
- Colour: Bay
- Breeder: Thomas Dewar, 1st Baron Dewar
- Owner: John Arthur Dewar
- Trainer: Fred Darling
- Record: 9: 5-0-3
- Earnings: £31,287

Major wins
- 2000 Guineas Stakes (1931); Epsom Derby (1931); St. James's Palace Stakes (1931); Champion Stakes (1932)

Cameronian (1928–1955) was a British Thoroughbred racehorse and sire. He won the 2000 Guineas Stakes and the Derby in 1931 but finished unplaced in the St. Leger in his attempt to win the English Triple Crown. He returned as a four-year-old to win the Champion Stakes in 1932.

== Background ==
Cameronian was a small bay horse, bred by his first owner, the Scottish whisky distiller Thomas Dewar, 1st Baron Dewar. On Lord Dewar's death in 1930, the unraced two-year-old colt was inherited by his nephew John Arthur “Lucky” Dewar. The death of an owner had traditionally canceled all of a horse's entries, but a rule change in 1929 meant that Cameronian's status was not affected, allowing him to take part in the Classics.

Cameronian's sire, Pharos was a top class racehorse who won the Champion Stakes and went on to become a highly successful stallion. He sired many good winners including the French champion Pharis and the unbeaten Nearco, who became one of the most influential stallions of the 20th Century. Cameronian was the third of seven Derby winners trained by Fred Darling at Beckhampton, Wiltshire.

== Racing career ==
=== 1930: two-year-old season ===
Cameronian was slow to mature as a two-year-old and ran only once, winning a minor race at Salisbury. He was not rated in that year's Free Handicap, a rating of the leading two-year-olds.

=== 1931: three-year-old season ===
Cameronian began his three-year-old season by running third to Philae in the Craven Stakes at Newmarket, beaten just over a length. His effort was attracted attention and he was introduced into the Derby betting as second favourite. In the 2000 Guineas three weeks later he started at 100/8 and was ridden by Joe Childs, as the stable jockey Fred Fox rode the more fancied Lemnarchus. On heavy ground which had forced the withdrawal of the likely favourite Jacopo. Cameronian won by two lengths from the French colt Goyescas

In the Derby at Epsom a month later Cameronian started 7/2 favourite. Ridden by Fox he broke quickly and was then steadied to track the leaders in the early stages before moving into the lead as the field entered the straight. Orpen emerged as his main challenger, moving alongside Cameronian two furlongs out but after a "terrific struggle" Cameronian prevailed by three quarters of a length. Sandwich, who had been badly drawn and been hampered during the race finished strongly to take third. The win for the favourite was extremely popular with the public, though not with the bookmakers, several of whom "welshed" (failed to pay out winning bets) on the race. At the victory celebration, Dewar, who described himself as "the most delighted man in the world", decorated the Savoy Hotel with a hundred miles of tartan ribbon.

Cameronian was sent to Royal Ascot two weeks later for the St. James's Palace Stakes over one mile. He recorded a popular victory, winning by three lengths from Trinidad in "brilliant" style.

The colt was then rested until the September, when he started odds-on favourite for the St Leger at Doncaster Racecourse, despite doubts from some experts about his ability to stay the one and three quarter mile distance. His attempt to become the first Triple Crown winner since Rock Sand in 1903 however, ended in failure. He pulled hard on the way to the start where, according to Fred Fox, he "went mad", becoming highly agitated and kicking out at other horses. In the race the colt fought Fox's attempts to settle him. By the straight he was exhausted and dropped out to finish last of the ten runners behind Sandwich. Although Cameronian was found to be running a temperature after the race he soon recovered. His connections were unable to explain his poor effort, with Darling explicitly ruling out the possibility of the horse having been "got at". Plans to retire the colt at the end of the season were revised.

=== 1932: four-year-old season ===
At four, Cameronian began in June by finishing third in a "stirring" finish to the Coronation Cup at Epsom, beaten a head and a short-head by the five-year-old Salmon Leap and Goyescas.

In September he ran a close third to Firdaussi, when attempting to give the winner twelve pounds in the Jockey Club Stakes. On his final start he recorded his most important victory since the Derby by beating the three-year-old Dastur in the Champion Stakes.

== Assessment ==
In their book A Century of Champions, John Randall and Tony Morris rated Cameronian as an "average" Derby winner.

== Stud career ==
Cameronian made a promising start to his stud career by siring the St Leger winner Scottish Union in his first crop of foals. His son Finis won the wartime Gold Cup in 1941, but in the same year Cameronian was sold and exported to Argentina, where he died in 1955.

== Pedigree ==
Pedigree of Cameronian (GB), bay stallion, 1928
Sire Pharos (GB) 1920	Phalaris; 1913	Polymelus	Cyllene
Sire Pharos (GB) 1920	Phalaris; 1913	Polymelus	Maid Marian
Sire Pharos (GB) 1920	Phalaris; 1913	Bromus	Sainfoin
Sire Pharos (GB) 1920	Phalaris; 1913	Bromus	Cheery
Sire Pharos (GB) 1920	Scapa Flow; 1914	Chaucer	St. Simon
Sire Pharos (GB) 1920	Scapa Flow; 1914	Chaucer	Canterbury Pilgrim
Sire Pharos (GB) 1920	Scapa Flow; 1914	Anchora	Love Wisely
Sire Pharos (GB) 1920	Scapa Flow; 1914	Anchora	Eryholme
Dam Una Cameron (FR) 1922	Gainsborough; 1915	Bayardo	Bay Ronald
Dam Una Cameron (FR) 1922	Gainsborough; 1915	Bayardo	Galicia
Dam Una Cameron (FR) 1922	Gainsborough; 1915	Rosedrop	St. Frusquin
Dam Una Cameron (FR) 1922	Gainsborough; 1915	Rosedrop	Rosaline
Dam Una Cameron (FR) 1922	Cherimoya; 1908	Cherry Tree	Hampton
Dam Una Cameron (FR) 1922	Cherimoya; 1908	Cherry Tree	Cherry
Dam Una Cameron (FR) 1922	Cherimoya; 1908	Svelte	St. Simon
Dam Una Cameron (FR) 1922	Cherimoya; 1908	Svelte	Fine Lady (Family: 1)
