= Sun Chariot (horse) =

Irish-bred Thoroughbred racehorse

- Sire: Hyperion
- Grandsire: Gainsborough
- Dam: Clarence
- Damsire: Diligence
- Sex: Filly
- Foaled: 1939
- Country: Ireland
- Colour: Bay
- Breeder: National Stud
- Owner: King George VI
- Record: 9: 8-0-1
- Earnings: £9,209

Major wins
- Queen Mary Stakes (1941); Middle Park Stakes (1941); 1,000 Guineas Stakes (1942); Epsom Oaks (1942); St. Leger Stakes (1942)

Honours
- Sun Chariot Stakes at Newmarket Racecourse

Sun Chariot (foaled 1939 in Ireland, died 1963) was a Thoroughbred racehorse who achieved the English Fillies Triple Crown by winning the 1,000 Guineas, the Oaks and the St. Leger in 1942.

She was bred by the National Stud and raced for King George VI. Sun Chariot was a filly of great talent but very difficult temperament. Before she ever appeared on a racecourse, she displayed such a lack of promise that she was nearly returned to Ireland, where the stud then was. She topped the Free Handicap after winning the Middle Park Stakes, Queen Mary Stakes and two other races. However, in her first start as a three-year-old, she refused to make any effort and was beaten for what turned out to be the only time. She won the 1,000 Guineas, Oaks (despite steering a most wayward course) and the St. Leger, in which she beat the Derby winner, Watling Street.

In retirement, she bred some good winners at stud before her death in 1963, including: Blue Train, whose unsoundness prevented him from doing himself justice; Laudau (exported to Australia where he sired 14 stakeswinners for 36 stakeswins); Gigantic (Imperial Stakes, exported to New Zealand and a sire of stakes winners) and Pindari, whose successes included the King Edward VII Stakes and Great Voltigeur Stakes.

== See also ==
- Triple Crown of Thoroughbred Racing
