= Manna (horse) =

Irish-bred Thoroughbred racehorse

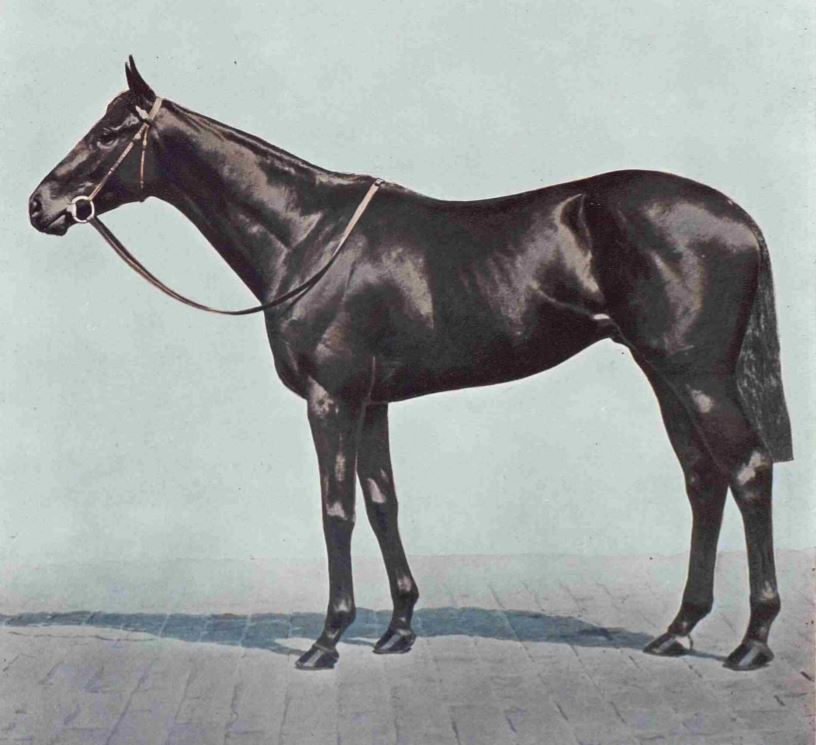
- Manna in 1925
- Sire: Phalaris
- Grandsire: Polymelus
- Dam: Waffles
- Damsire: Buckwheat
- Sex: Stallion
- Foaled: 1922
- Died: 1939 (aged 16–17)
- Country: Ireland
- Colour: Bay
- Breeder: James J. Maher
- Owner: Henry E. Morriss
- Trainer: Fred Darling
- Record: 8: 4-1-2
- Earnings: £23,354 (win prize only)

Major wins
- Richmond Stakes (1924); 2000 Guineas Stakes (1925); Epsom Derby (1925)

Manna (1922–1939) was a British Thoroughbred racehorse and sire. In a career which lasted from summer 1924 until September 1925, Manna ran eight times, winning four races. As a three-year-old in 1925 he won the 2000 Guineas at Newmarket and The Derby by a record margin of eight lengths. Manna was retired after breaking down in his bid to win the Triple Crown in the St. Leger at Doncaster. He later had a successful career at stud.

== Background ==
Manna, described by the Breeders’ Review as "a superb creature" with whom it was "impossible to find fault", was a bay horse bred in Ireland by James J. Maher at his Confey Stud in County Kildare. As a yearling he was sent to the sales at Doncaster, where he was sold for 6,300 gns to the trainer Fred Darling acting on behalf of the Shanghai-based bullion broker Henry E. Morriss. Darling had been instructed by a telegram from Morriss to buy the best yearling in the sale. Manna was trained by Darling at his stable at Beckhampton in Wiltshire where he proved to be a lively and high-spirited individual.

Manna was from the third crop of foals sired by Phalaris an outstanding sprinter who went on to become the most influential stallion of the 20th century. Manna's dam, the unraced mare Waffles, went on to produce the St. Leger winner Sandwich.

Morriss later explained the colt's name by saying "I always felt that he was a Heaven-sent gift... and Waffles, his dam is the name of a food."

== Racing career ==
=== 1924: two-year-old season ===
Manna made his debut in one of the season's most important races for two-year-olds, the National Breeders’ Produce Stakes at Sandown for which, on the basis of his home reputation, he started odds-on favourite. He failed to win but showed himself to be a promising colt by finishing third to Garden of Allah. This promise was confirmed when he won the Richmond Stakes at Goodwood on his next start in July.

At Kempton he finished second in the Imperial Produce Stakes to Picaroon, the year's champion two-year-old colt. He faced Picaroon again in the Middle Park Stakes. Manna took the lead in the final furlong but was outpaced in the last stages of the race and finished third behind Picaroon and Solario On his final start of the year, Manna beat Cross Bow to win the Moulton Stakes at Newmarket.

=== 1925: three-year-old season ===
The spring of 1925 was unusually wet, leading to heavy ground on which it was difficult to prepare horses. Manna was not, therefore, believed to be in peak condition for the 2000 Guineas, and started at odds of 100/8 in a field of thirteen. Ridden by Steve Donoghue, Manna led from the start and won easily, beating St. Becan by two lengths.

Manna was then aimed at the Derby although there were doubts about whether, as the son of a sprinter, he would have the stamina to be effective over one and a half miles on heavy ground. He started at odds of 9/1, with Cross Bow, who had won the Newmarket Stakes starting the 9/2 favourite. The race was run in "cold, driving rain" in front of a large crowd which included the King and Queen and other members of the Royal Family. Ridden confidently by Donoghue, Manna tracked the early leader, Dalmagarry, before moving to the front soon after half way. In the straight he pulled steadily further away from his rivals to win by eight lengths. The winning margin was the largest ever recorded in the race, and remained so until Shergar won by ten lengths in 1981. Although Manna had not been favourite, the win was reported to be enthusiastically received, largely because of the popularity of Donoghue, who was winning the race for the sixth time. After the race he explained that Manna had "shot to the front without any bidding from me" and that he had "never shown him the whip".

Manna failed to reproduce his Derby winning form at Royal Ascot. In the King Edward VII Stakes he finished a close third when attempting to give ten pounds to Solario a colt who had finished fourth at Epsom. The result caused debate concerning the relative merits of Manna and Solario, with some correspondents expressing the view that Solario had been beaten in the Derby only through a lack of fitness.

On his final start, Manna attempted to win the Triple Crown in the St. Leger for which he was made 7/2 joint-favourite with Solario. His task appeared to have been made much easier by the late withdrawal of the undefeated filly Saucy Sue who had won the 1000 Guineas and The Oaks. Manna looked "splendid" before the race and started strongly, leading the field in the early stages, but he was headed after a mile and dropped quickly out of contention. He finished tenth of the fifteen runners behind Solario, "limping", according to the Daily Telegraph, "like a tired old hound with thorns in his pads." It was subsequently revealed that Manna had sustained an injury to his right foreleg which proved severe enough to end his racing career.

== Assessment ==
In their book A Century of Champions, John Randall and Tony Morris rated Manna an "average" Derby winner and the one hundred and fifteenth best British racehorse of the 20th century.

== Stud career ==
For his stud career, Manna was syndicated ("turned into limited liablility company") by his owner, with the intention that his future should be managed on "efficient business lines". It was reported that his stud fee was likely to be 400 gns. Standing at the Banstead Manor Stud, at Cheveley, near Newmarket, Manna was a reasonably successful stallion with the best of his progeny being the 2000 Guineas winner Colombo and the undefeated Mannamead. His son Manitoba was one of leading British two-year-old of 1932 who went on to become an important stallion in Australia. He died after breaking a blood vessel in October 1939. He was buried at the Banstead Manor Stud, where the stallion man's cottage is still known as "Manna Cottage."

== Pedigree ==
Pedigree of Manna (IRE), bay stallion, 1922
Sire Phalaris (GB) 1913	Polymelus; 1902	Cyllene	Bona Vista
Sire Phalaris (GB) 1913	Polymelus; 1902	Cyllene	Arcadia
Sire Phalaris (GB) 1913	Polymelus; 1902	Maid Marian	Hampton
Sire Phalaris (GB) 1913	Polymelus; 1902	Maid Marian	Quiver
Sire Phalaris (GB) 1913	Bromus; 1905	Sainfoin	Springfield
Sire Phalaris (GB) 1913	Bromus; 1905	Sainfoin	Sanda
Sire Phalaris (GB) 1913	Bromus; 1905	Cheery	St. Simon*
Sire Phalaris (GB) 1913	Bromus; 1905	Cheery	Sunrise
Dam Waffles (IRE) 1917	Buckwheat; 1906	Martagon	Bend Or
Dam Waffles (IRE) 1917	Buckwheat; 1906	Martagon	Tiger Lily
Dam Waffles (IRE) 1917	Buckwheat; 1906	Sesame	St. Simon*
Dam Waffles (IRE) 1917	Buckwheat; 1906	Sesame	Maize
Dam Waffles (IRE) 1917	Lady Mischief; 1903	St. Simon*	Galopin
Dam Waffles (IRE) 1917	Lady Mischief; 1903	St. Simon*	St Angela
Dam Waffles (IRE) 1917	Lady Mischief; 1903	Vain Duchess	Isinglass
Dam Waffles (IRE) 1917	Lady Mischief; 1903	Vain Duchess	Sweet Duchess (Family: 22-d)

- Manna was inbred 3x4x4 to St. Simon. This means that the stallion appears once in the third, and twice in the fourth generation of his pedigree.
