= Embla (disambiguation) =

Embla is the first woman in Norse mythology.

Embla may also refer to:

- Embla (given name)
- Embla (horse), a racehorse
- Embla (restaurant)
- The White Viking, an Icelandic film
