= Udaipur (horse) =

British-bred Thoroughbred racehorse

- Sire: Blandford
- Grandsire: Swynford
- Dam: Uganda
- Damsire: Bridaine
- Sex: Mare
- Foaled: 1929
- Died: 1949 (aged 19–20)
- Country: United Kingdom
- Colour: Brown
- Breeder: Aga Khan III
- Owner: Aga Khan III
- Trainer: Frank Butters
- Record: 8: 4-1-0
- Earnings: £15,047

Major wins
- Epsom Oaks (1932); Coronation Stakes (1932); Richemont Stakes (1932); Newmarket Oaks (1932)

Udaipur (1929 – 1949) was a British Thoroughbred racehorse and broodmare. Her racing career consisted of eight races between April and October 1932. Having finished second on her debut and seventh in the 1000 Guineas she was still a maiden when she recorded her biggest win in the Epsom Oaks in June. She went on to win the Coronation Stakes, Richemont Stakes and Newmarket Oaks as well as finishing fourth in a strong edition of the St Leger. As a broodmare she produced several good winners and was the female-line ancestor of Wild Again.

== Background ==
Udaipur was a good looking brown mare with no white markings bred in England by her owner Aga Khan III. She entered training with Frank Butters at the Fitzroy House stable in Newmarket, Suffolk.

She was sired by Blandford an Irish-bred stallion who won three of his four races including the Princess of Wales's Stakes. He went to become an outstanding breeding stallion who was a three-time Leading sire in Great Britain and Ireland and whose other offspring included Bahram, Blenheim, Brantome and Windsor Lad. Udaipur's dam Uganda was a top-class racehorse who won the Prix de Diane and Prix Royal-Oak in 1924. After being bought by the Aga Khan at the end of her racing career she became a very successful broodmare whose other foals included Ukrania (Prix de Diane), Umidwar (Champion Stakes), Ut Majeur (Cesarewitch) and Una (dam of Palestine).

== Racing career ==
=== 1932: three-year-old season ===
Having been unraced as a juvenile, Udaipur made her racecourse debut in April, when she finished second in a maiden race at Newmarket Racecourse. She was stepped up in class for the 1000 Guineas at the same track at the end of the month and came home seventh of the nineteen runners behind Kandy, a French-trained outsider who had been left in the race by mistake.

On 3 of June, ridden by the Irish jockey Michael Beary, Udaipur stated at odds of 10/1 for the 154th running of the Oaks Stakes over one and a half miles at Epsom Racecourse. Lord Woolavington's Will o' the Wisp and Lord Glanely's Ada Dear started joint favourites, while the other nine runners included the 1000 Guineas runner-up Thorndean and the Cheveley Park Stakes winner Concordia. After racing just behind the leaders, Udaipur made a forward move early in the straight and overtook the leader Will o' the Wisp a furlong out. She won the race by two lengths from Will o' the Wisp with the same distance back to Giudecca in third place. Later in June Udaipur was dropped back in distance for the Coronation Stakes over one mile at Royal Ascot. She was not expected to be suited by the shorter trip and started at odds of 6/1, but with Beary in the saddle she won "in a canter" by three lengths from Pennycross (later to win the Falmouth Stakes) and Ada Dear. Her performance led to her being described as "the best three-year-old filly in the country".

After a two month break Udaipur returned to win the Richemont Stakes at Hurst Park and was then matched against male opposition in the St Leger at Doncaster Racecourse on 7 September. With Beary opting to ride the Epsom Derby runner-up Dastur, she was partnered by Harry Wraggg. The filly ran creditably to finish fourth of the nineteen runners behind her unfancied stablemate Firdaussi after being denied a clear run in the straight. The unplaced runners included April the Fifth and Orwell. Udaipur returned to winning form to take the Newmarket Oaks over fourteen furlongs, but on her final appearance she ran poorly to finish fourth in the Atalanta Stakes at Sandown Park.

== Assessment and honours ==
Udaipur's earnings of £15,047 in 1932 made her the second biggest money winner in England behind Firdaussi, with Miracle, Myrobella, Orwell and April the Fifth filling the next four places on the list.

In their book, A Century of Champions, based on the Timeform rating system, John Randall and Tony Morris rated Udaipur an "inferior" winner of the Oaks.

== Breeding record ==
At the end of her racing career Udaipur was retired to become a broodmare for the Aga Khan's stud. Her offspring included the top-classperformers Umiddad, Naishapur and Dust Devil as well as the influential broodmares Clovelly and Sonibai. In total, she produced at least nine foals between 1934 and 1949.

- Dharampur, a bay colt, foaled in 1934, sired by Fairway. Won one race; third in Jersey Stakes.
- Airway, bay colt, 1937, by Fairway. Won two races.
- Clovelly, bay filly, 1938, by Mahmoud. Failed to win a race. Dam of Claro (Irish 2000 Guineas) and female-line ancestor of Bamboo Atlas (Tokyo Yushun) and Wild Again.
- Sonibai, brown filly, 1939, by Solario. Won two races. Dam of Hindostan (Irish Derby, Leading sire in Japan).
- Umiddad, bay colt, 1940, by Dastur. Won Gold Cup, second in the Derby.
- Naishapur, brown filly, 1942, by Nearco. Runner-up in the Oaks. Dam of Neemah (Royal Lodge Stakes)
- Dust Devil, brown colt, 1946, by Stardust. Won Jockey Club Stakes.
- Sarabhai, filly, 1948, by Stardust. Failed to win a race.
- Usmania, filly, 1949, by Stardust. Failed to win a race.

Udaipur died in 1949 after producing her last foal.

== Pedigree ==
Pedigree of Udaipur (GB), brown mare, 1929
Sire Blandford (IRE) 1919	Swynford (GB); 1907	John O’Gaunt	Isinglass
Sire Blandford (IRE) 1919	Swynford (GB); 1907	John O’Gaunt	La Fleche
Sire Blandford (IRE) 1919	Swynford (GB); 1907	Canterbury Pilgrim	Tristan
Sire Blandford (IRE) 1919	Swynford (GB); 1907	Canterbury Pilgrim	Pilgrimage
Sire Blandford (IRE) 1919	Blanche (IRE); 1912	White Eagle (GB)	Gallinule
Sire Blandford (IRE) 1919	Blanche (IRE); 1912	White Eagle (GB)	Merry Gal
Sire Blandford (IRE) 1919	Blanche (IRE); 1912	Black Cherry (GB)	Bendigo
Sire Blandford (IRE) 1919	Blanche (IRE); 1912	Black Cherry (GB)	Black Duchess
Dam Uganda (FR) 1921	Bridaine (FR); 1914	Gorgos (GB)	Ladas
Dam Uganda (FR) 1921	Bridaine (FR); 1914	Gorgos (GB)	The Gorgon
Dam Uganda (FR) 1921	Bridaine (FR); 1914	Bitter Orange (GB)	William the Third
Dam Uganda (FR) 1921	Bridaine (FR); 1914	Bitter Orange (GB)	Tragedy Queen (IRE)
Dam Uganda (FR) 1921	Hush (GB); 1911	St Serf	St Simon
Dam Uganda (FR) 1921	Hush (GB); 1911	St Serf	Feronia
Dam Uganda (FR) 1921	Hush (GB); 1911	Silent Lady	Cyllene
Dam Uganda (FR) 1921	Hush (GB); 1911	Silent Lady	Miss Gunning (Family 3-e)
