= Cheveley Park Stakes =

Flat horse race in Britain

- Class: Group 1
- Location: Rowley Mile; Newmarket, England
- Inaugurated: 1899
- Race type: Flat / Thoroughbred
- Sponsor: Tattersalls
- Website: Newmarket

Race information
- Distance: 6f (1,207 metres)
- Surface: Turf
- Track: Straight
- Qualification: Two-year-old fillies
- Weight: 9 st 2 lb
- Purse: £275,000 (2026); 1st: £155,953

Cheveley Park Stakes
2026
Sun Goddess	Libertango	Alwaysanangel

Previous years
2025
True Love	Havana Anna	Royal Fixation
2024
Lake Victoria	Daylight	Arabian Dusk
2023
Porta Fortuna	Pearls And Rubies	Sacred Angel
2022
Lezoo	Meditate	Mawj
2021
Tenebrism	Flotus	Sandrine

2020-2011
2020
Alcohol Free	Miss Amulet	Umm Kulthum
2019
Millisle	Raffle Prize	Tropbeau
2018
Fairyland	The Mackem Bullet	So Perfect
2017
Clemmie	Different League	Madeline
2016
Brave Anna	Roly Poly	Lady Aurelia
2015
Lumiere	Illuminate	Besharah
2014
Tiggy Wiggy	Anthem Alexander	High Celebrity
2013
Vorda	Princess Noor	Kiyoshi
2012
Rosdhu Queen	Winning Express	Baileys Jubilee
2011
Lightening Pearl	Sunday Times	Angels Will Fall

2010-2001
2010
Hooray	Rimth	Maqaasid
2009
Special Duty	Misheer	Lady Of The Desert
2008
Serious Attitude	Aspen Darlin	Pursuit Of Glory
2007
Natagora	Fleeting Spirit	Festoso
2006
Indian Ink	Dhanyata	Silca Chiave
2005
Donna Blini	Wake Up Maggie	Flashy Wings
2004
Magical Romance	Suez	Damson
2003
Carry On Katie	Majestic Desert	Badminton
2002
Airwave	Russian Rhythm	Danaskaya
2001
Queen's Logic	Sophisticat	Good Girl

2000-1991
2000
Regal Rose	Toroca	Mala Mala
1999
Seazun	Torgau	Crimplene
1998
Wannabe Grand	Imperial Beauty	Subeen
1997
Embassy	Crazee Mental	Royal Shyness
1996
Pas De Reponse	Moonlight Paradise	Ocean Ridge
1995
Blue Duster	My Branch	Najiya
1994
Gay Gallanta	Tanami	Harayir
1993
Prophecy	Risky	Lemon Souffle
1992
Sayyedati	Lyric Fantasy	Poker Chip
1991
Marling	Absurde	Basma

1990-1988
1990
Capricciosa	Imperfect Circle	Divine Danse
1989
Dead Certain	Line Of Thunder	Chimes Of Freedom
1988
Pass The Peace	Dancing Tribute	Jaljuli

The Cheveley Park Stakes is a Group 1 flat horse race in Great Britain open to two-year-old fillies. It is run on the Rowley Mile at Newmarket over a distance of 6 furlongs (1,207 metres) and is scheduled to take place each year in late September.

== History ==
The event is named after Cheveley Park, an estate purchased by Harry McCalmont in 1892. It was established in 1899, and Lutetia won the inaugural running.

The race is currently held on the final day of Newmarket's three-day Cambridgeshire Meeting, the same day as the Cambridgeshire Handicap.

The leading horses from the Cheveley Park Stakes often go on to compete in the following season's 1,000 Guineas. The first to win both was Pretty Polly (1903–04), and the most recent was True Love (2025–26).

== Records ==
Leading jockey (9 wins):

- Sir Gordon Richards – Tiffin (1928), Keystone (1940), Lady Sybil (1942), Neolight (1945), Pambidian (1948), Belle of All (1950), Zabara (1951), Bebe Grande (1952), Sixpence (1953)

Leading trainer (7 wins):

- Aidan O'Brien - Brave Anna (2016), Clemmie (2017), Fairyland (2018), Tenebrism (2021), Lake Victoria (2024), True Love (2025), Sun Goddess (2026)

Leading owner (7 wins): (includes part ownership)

- Sue Magnier, Michael Tabor - Brave Anna (2016), Clemmie (2017), Fairyland (2018), Tenebrism (2021), Lake Victoria (2024), True Love (2025), Sun Goddess (2026)

== Winners ==
Year	Winner	Jockey	Trainer	Owner	Time
1899	Lutetia	Tod Sloan	John Huggins
1900	Alruna	Fred Rickaby	Percy Peck
1901	Punctilio	Otto Madden	Reg Day		1:20.80
1902	Skyscraper	William Halsey	John Watson		1:15.40
1903	Pretty Polly		Peter Gilpin	Eustace Loder
1904	Galantine	Otto Madden	Charles Archer
1905	Colonia	Billy Higgs	Jack Robinson
1906	Witch Elm	Barry Lynham	Jack Robinson	William Walker
1907	Bracelet	Bernard Dillon	Lewis
1908	Maid of the Mist (Note: Maid of the Mist was unnamed as a 2-y-o and raced as "Sceptre filly".)	Otto Madden	Alec Taylor Jr.
1909	Maid of Corinth	Bernard Dillon	Alec Taylor Jr.
1910	Knockfeerna	Frank O'Neill	Peter Gilpin
1911	Belleisle	Herbert Jones	Willie Waugh
1912	Merula	Charlie Foy	Willie Waugh
1913	Shake Down	Elijah Wheatley	Sam Darling
1914	Lady of Asia	Henri Jelliss	Tom Jennings Jr.
1915	Fifinella	Steve Donoghue	Richard Dawson	Edward Hulton
1916	Molly Desmond	Albert Whalley	Peter Gilpin		1:13.20
1917	Freesia	Skeets Martin	Alf Sadler Jr.
1918	Bayuda	Joe Childs	Alec Taylor Jr.	Lady James Douglas
1919	Bright Folly	Arthur Smith	Frank Barling
1920	Romana	Frank Bullock	Basil Jarvis		1:14.40
1921	Selene	Steve Donoghue	George Lambton		1:13.60
1922	Paola	George Hulme	Richard Dawson		1:12.80
1923	Chronometer	Bernard Carslake	Atty Persse		1:14.40
1924	Miss Gadabout	Frank Bullock	Alec Taylor Jr.		1:16.00
1925	Karra	Charlie Elliott	Jack Jarvis		1:12.80
1926	Nipisiquit	Charlie Childs	Colledge Leader		1:12.20
1927	Scuttle	Joe Childs	Willie Jarvis	King George V	1:15.40
1928	Tiffin	Gordon Richards	Fred Darling	Lord Ellesmere	1:13.20
1929	Merry Wife	Harry Wragg	Richard Dawson
1930	The Leopard	Bernard Carslake	Norman Scobie		1:15.20
1931	Concordia	Bobby Jones	Joseph Lawson		1:14.00
1932	Brown Betty	Joe Childs	Cecil Boyd-Rochfort	William Woodward Sr.	1:14.80
1933	Light Brocade	Bernard Carslake	Frank Butters	Lord Durham	1:13.80
1934	Lady Gabrial	Bernard Carslake	Atty Persse	D Sullivan	1:12.80
1935	Ferrybridge	Michael Beary	Martin Hartigan	R F Watson	1:15.80
1936	Celestial Way	Bernard Carslake	George Lambton	H Cecil	1:14.40
1937	Stafaralla	Harry Wragg	Frank Butters	Prince Aly Khan	1:13.40
1938	Seaway	Tommy Lowrey	Basil Jarvis	Mr J S Courtauld	1:13.60
1939	no race (Note: The 1939 race was cancelled due to the outbreak of World War II)
1940	Keystone (Note: Keystone was unnamed as a 2-y-o and raced as "Rosetta filly".)	Gordon Richards	Fred Darling	Peter Beatty	1:18.80
1941	Perfect Peace	Harry Wragg	Joseph Lawson	Lord Glanely	1:14.00
1942	Lady Sybil	Gordon Richards	Willie Pratt	M H Benson	1:13.60
1943	Fair Fame	Freddy Lane	Harvey Leader	Mrs B Lavington	1:13.60
1944	Sweet Cygnet	Charlie Elliott	Tom Rimell	H H Leven	1:13.00
1945	Neolight	Gordon Richards	Fred Darling	J A Dewar	1:13.00
1946	Djerba	Charlie Elliott	In France	Marcel Boussac	1:16.60
1947	Ash Blonde	Percy Evans	Jack Colling	Lord Astor	1:11.60
1948	Pambidian	Gordon Richards	Walter Nightingall	C R Harper	1:14.40
1949	Corejada	Charlie Elliott	Charles Semblat	Marcel Boussac	1:15.00
1950	Belle of All	Gordon Richards	Norman Bertie	H S Tufton	1:15.80
1951	Zabara	Gordon Richards	Vic Smyth	Sir Malcolm McAlpine	1:13.20
1952	Bebe Grande	Gordon Richards	Sam Armstrong	J S Gerber	1:15.72
1953	Sixpence	Gordon Richards	Paddy Prendergast	A L Hawkins	1:12.25
1954	Gloria Nicky	Scobie Breasley	Norman Bertie	Mrs R Digby	1:13.55
1955	Midget II	Roger Poincelet	Alec Head	Pierre Wertheimer	1:13.48
1956	Sarcelle	Scobie Breasley	Noel Cannon	Keith Mason	1:13.46
1957	Rich and Rare	Manny Mercer	Jack Jarvis	T F Blackwell	1:14.11
1958	Lindsay	Manny Mercer	Richard D Peacock	F Ellison	1:22.36
1959	Queensberry	Eph Smith	John Waugh	Colonel B Hornung	1:14.81
1960	Opaline II	George Moore	Alec Head	Aga Khan IV	1:15.61
1961	Display	Ron Hutchinson	Paddy Prendergast	Beatrice, Lady Granard	1:14.44
1962	My Goodness Me	Eph Smith	Geoffrey Brooke	David Robinson	1:13.41
1963	Crimea II	Harry Carr	Cecil Boyd-Rochfort	Mrs J W Haines	1:12.37
1964	Night Off	Joe Mercer	Walter Wharton	Major L B Holliday	1:15.09
1965	Berkeley Springs	Geoff Lewis	Ian Balding	Paul Mellon	Not taken
1966	Fleet	Lester Piggott	Noel Murless	R C Boucher	1:16.52
1967	Lalibela	Lester Piggott	Vincent O'Brien	J P Philipps	1:13.43
1968	Mige	J Taillard	Alec Head	Madame P Wertheimer	1:15.40
1969	Humble Duty	Duncan Keith	Peter Walwyn	Lady Jean Ashcombe	1:12.65
1970	Magic Flute	Sandy Barclay	Noel Murless	Lord Howard de Walden	1:12.65
1971	Waterloo	Edward Hide	Bill Watts	Susan Stanley	1:13.77
1972	Jacinth	John Gorton	Bruce Hobbs	Lady Butt	1:12.73
1973	Gentle Thoughts	Bill Pyers	Ted Curtin	Nelson Bunker Hunt	1:15.15
1974	Cry of Truth	John Gorton	Bruce Hobbs	Pearl Lawson Johnston	1:15.48
1975	Pasty	Pat Eddery	Peter Walwyn	Percival Williams	1:15.05
1976	Durtal	Lester Piggott	Barry Hills	Robert Sangster	1:14.41
1977	Sookera	Wally Swinburn	Dermot Weld	Robert Sangster	1:11.45
1978	Devon Ditty	Greville Starkey	Harry Thomson Jones	Sir Edwin McAlpine	1:21.08
1979	Mrs Penny	John Matthias	Ian Balding	Eric Kronfeld	1:13.56
1980	Marwell	Lester Piggott	Michael Stoute	Sir Edmund Loder	1:12.74
1981	Woodstream	Pat Eddery	Vincent O'Brien	Robert Sangster	1:14.12
1982	Ma Biche	Freddy Head	Criquette Head	Ghislaine Head	1:14.63
1983	Desirable	Steve Cauthen	Barry Hills	Catherine Corbett	1:14.84
1984	Park Appeal	Declan Gillespie	Jim Bolger	Paddy Burns	1:13.98
1985	Embla	Angel Cordero	Luca Cumani	Charles St George	1:12.52
1986	Minstrella (Note: Forest Flower finished first in 1986, but she was subsequently disqualified and placed last)	John Reid	Charlie Nelson	Ned Evans	1:12.50
1987	Ravinella	Gary W. Moore	Criquette Head	Ecurie Åland	1:14.26
1988	Pass the Peace	Richard Quinn	Paul Cole	Brian Bell	1:11.88
1989	Dead Certain	Cash Asmussen	David Elsworth	Toby Marten	1:14.47
1990	Capricciosa	John Reid	Vincent O'Brien	Robert Sangster	1:12.23
1991	Marling	Walter Swinburn	Geoff Wragg	Sir Edmund Loder	1:11.17
1992	Sayyedati	Walter Swinburn	Clive Brittain	Mohamed Obaida	1:11.82
1993	Prophecy	Pat Eddery	John Gosden	Khalid Abdullah	1:14.68
1994	Gay Gallanta	Pat Eddery	Michael Stoute	Cheveley Park Stud	1:11.08
1995	Blue Duster	Michael Kinane	David Loder	Sheikh Mohammed	1:12.78
1996	Pas de Reponse	Freddy Head	Criquette Head	Wertheimer et Frère	1:11.16
1997	Embassy	Kieren Fallon	David Loder	Sheikh Mohammed	1:12.26
1998	Wannabe Grand	Pat Eddery	Jeremy Noseda	Bruce McAllister	1:12.40
1999 (Note: The 1999 race was run on the July Course at Newmarket)	Seazun	Richard Quinn	Mick Channon	John Breslin	1:12.92
2000	Regal Rose	Frankie Dettori	Sir Michael Stoute	Cheveley Park Stud	1:13.75
2001	Queen's Logic	Steve Drowne	Mick Channon	Jaber Abdullah	1:12.34
2002	Airwave	Chris Rutter	Henry Candy	Henry Candy & Partners	1:10.72
2003	Carry On Katie	Frankie Dettori	Jeremy Noseda	Mohammed Rashid	1:13.03
2004	Magical Romance	Robert Winston	Brian Meehan	Con Wilson	1:12.61
2005	Donna Blini	Michael Kinane	Brian Meehan	Jayne Cunningham	1:10.88
2006	Indian Ink	Richard Hughes	Richard Hannon Sr.	Raymond Tooth	1:14.81
2007	Natagora	Christophe Lemaire	Pascal Bary	Stefan Friborg	1:11.55
2008	Serious Attitude	Jimmy Fortune	Rae Guest	Willis / Guest	1:09.94
2009	Special Duty	Stéphane Pasquier	Criquette Head-Maarek	Khalid Abdullah	1:10.38
2010	Hooray	Seb Sanders	Sir Mark Prescott	Cheveley Park Stud	1:14.09
2011	Lightening Pearl	Johnny Murtagh	Ger Lyons	Pearl Bloodstock Ltd	1:11.23
2012	Rosdhu Queen	Johnny Murtagh	William Haggas	Clipper Logistics	1:11.10
2013	Vorda	Olivier Peslier	Philippe Sogorb	Mohammed bin Khalifa Al Thani	1:13.34
2014	Tiggy Wiggy	Richard Hughes	Richard Hannon Jr.	Potensis Ltd C Giles Merriebelle Stables	1:11.40
2015	Lumiere	William Buick	Mark Johnston	Hamdan bin Mohammed Al Maktoum	1:11.98
2016	Brave Anna	Seamie Heffernan	Aidan O'Brien	Evie Stockwell	1:11.92
2017	Clemmie	Ryan Moore	Aidan O'Brien	Tabor / Smith / Magnier	1:12.00
2018	Fairyland	Donnacha O'Brien	Aidan O'Brien	Stockwell / Tabor / Smith	1:10.13
2019	Millisle	Shane Foley	Jessica Harrington	Stonethorn Stud Farms	1:09.39
2020	Alcohol Free	Oisin Murphy	Andrew Balding	Jeff Smith	1:10.00
2021	Tenebrism	Ryan Moore	Aidan O'Brien	Westerberg / Coolmore / Merribelle Stables	1:11.00
2022	Lezoo	William Buick	Ralph Beckett	Marc Chan & Andrew Rosen	1:11.84
2023	Porta Fortuna	Oisin Murphy	Donnacha O'Brien	Medallion/S Weston/B Fowler/Reeves T'Bs	1:10.66
2024	Lake Victoria	Ryan Moore	Aidan O'Brien	Tabor / Smith / Magnier	1:11.94
2025	True Love	Wayne Lordan	Aidan O'Brien	Tabor / Smith / Magnier	1:11.00
2026	Sun Goddess	Ryan Moore	Aidan O'Brien	Smith / Magnier / Tabor / Westerberg	1:09.08

== See also ==
- Horse racing in Great Britain
- List of British flat horse races
