= Beam (horse) =

British Thoroughbred racehorse

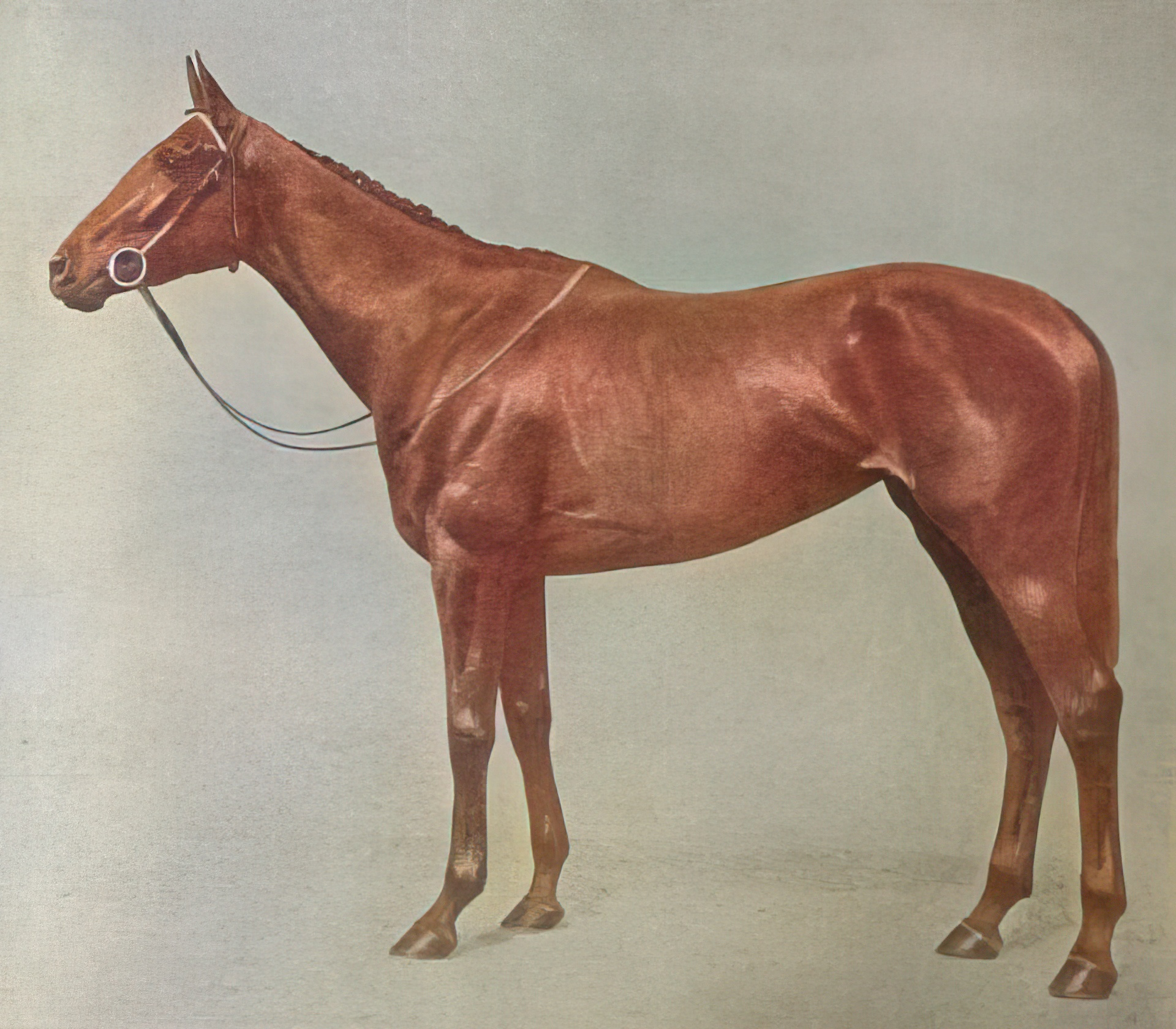
- Sire: Galloper Light
- Grandsire: Sunstar
- Dam: Mistrella
- Damsire: Cyllene
- Sex: Mare
- Foaled: 1924
- Country: United Kingdom
- Colour: Bay
- Breeder: John Lambton, 3rd Earl of Durham
- Owner: Earl of Durham
- Trainer: Frank Butters
- Record: 9: 4-1-1

Major wins
- Epsom Oaks (1927)

Beam (1924 – 1941) was a British Thoroughbred racehorse and broodmare. As a juvenile she showed promise by winning one race and finishing third in the Molecomb Stakes. In the following year she finished fourth in the 1000 Guineas and won the Haverhill Stakes before beating a strong field to take the Epsom Oaks in a race record time which stood for more than half a century. She was retired from racing at the end of the season. Beam made no impact as a dam of winners and died in 1941 at the age of seventeen.

== Background ==
Beam was a bay mare bred in the United Kingdom by her owner John Lambton, 3rd Earl of Durham. She was sent into training with Frank Butters at his Fitzroy House stable in Newmarket, Suffolk. She was ridden in most of her races by Tommy Weston.

She was one of the best horses sired by Galloper Light, an English-bred stallion who won the Grand Prix de Paris in 1919. Beam was a daughter of Mistrella (foaled 1907), a British broodmare whose other descendants included Light Brocade, Lady Capulet and the Ascot Gold Cup winners Foxhunter and Trimdon.

== Racing career ==
=== 1926: two-year-old season ===
As a two-year-old in 1926, Beam ran four times and recorded her only success on her final appearance when she won the Houghton Stakes at Newmarket Racecourse winning by a short head from Cartona. She had earlier finished third to the colt Shian Mor in the Molecomb Stakes at Goodwood.

=== 1927: three-year-old season ===
In the spring of 1927 of Beam ran in the 1000 Guineas over the Rowley Mile at Newmarket and finished fourth of the twenty-eight runners behind Cresta Run, Book Law and Endowment. At the same track in May she won the nine-furlong Haverhill Stakes, coming home eight lengths clear of her eight opponents.

On 3 of June Beam was one of sixteen three-year-old fillies to contest the 149th running of the Oaks Stakes over one and a half miles at Epsom Racecourse. Book Law started the 5/2 favourite ahead of Cresta Run with Beam next in the betting on 4/1. Beam took the lead from the start but after becoming unbalanced on the downhill section of the course she stumbled and was overtaken by Book Law. She rallied in the closing stages to regain the advantage and won a "terrific race" by a head from Book Law with a gap of six lengths back to Grande Vitesse in third place. Her winning time of 2:34.6 was a record for the race which stood until 1982. Tommy Weston reported that the filly had been unsuited by the course and would have won by at least two lengths on a straight track.

Later in June Beam was beaten by Adieu in the Queen's Vase at Royal Ascot. She won one other minor race in 1927 before being retired from racing at the end of the season.

== Assessment and honours ==
In their book, A Century of Champions, based on the Timeform rating system, John Randall and Tony Morris rated Beam an "inferior" winner of the Oaks.

== Breeding record ==
Beam was retired from racing to become a broodmare for Lord Durham's stud. She produced two minor winners from nine foals and died in 1941.

== Pedigree ==
Pedigree of Beam (GB), bay mare, 1924
Sire Galloper Light (GB) 1916	Sunstar (GB); 1908	Sundridge	Amphion
Sire Galloper Light (GB) 1916	Sunstar (GB); 1908	Sundridge	Sierra
Sire Galloper Light (GB) 1916	Sunstar (GB); 1908	Doris	Loved One
Sire Galloper Light (GB) 1916	Sunstar (GB); 1908	Doris	Lauretta
Sire Galloper Light (GB) 1916	Santa Fina (GB); 1907	St Frusquin	St Simon
Sire Galloper Light (GB) 1916	Santa Fina (GB); 1907	St Frusquin	Isabel
Sire Galloper Light (GB) 1916	Santa Fina (GB); 1907	Grig	Crafton
Sire Galloper Light (GB) 1916	Santa Fina (GB); 1907	Grig	Merrie Lassie
Dam Mistrella (GB) 1907	Cyllene (GB); 1895	Bona Vista	Bend Or
Dam Mistrella (GB) 1907	Cyllene (GB); 1895	Bona Vista	Vista
Dam Mistrella (GB) 1907	Cyllene (GB); 1895	Arcadia	Isonomy
Dam Mistrella (GB) 1907	Cyllene (GB); 1895	Arcadia	Distant Shore
Dam Mistrella (GB) 1907	Ark Royal (GB); 1898	Royal Hampton	Hampton
Dam Mistrella (GB) 1907	Ark Royal (GB); 1898	Royal Hampton	Princess
Dam Mistrella (GB) 1907	Ark Royal (GB); 1898	War Sprite	Galopin
Dam Mistrella (GB) 1907	Ark Royal (GB); 1898	War Sprite	Bellatrix (Family 1-l)
