= Cresta Run (horse) =

British-bred Thoroughbred racehorse

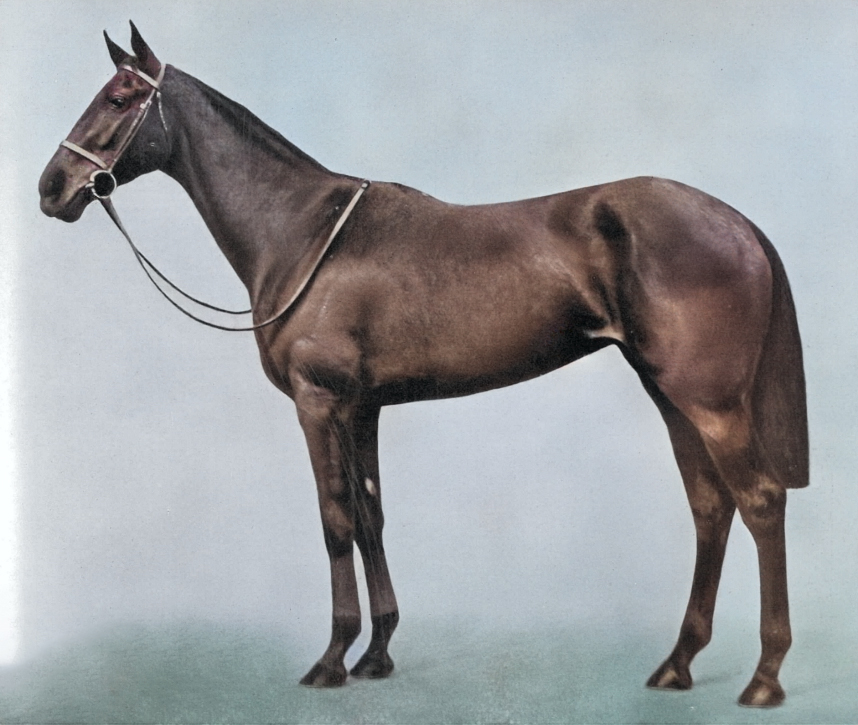
- Cresta Run in 1927.
- Sire: Hurry On
- Grandsire: Marcovil
- Dam: Bridgemount
- Damsire: Bridge of Earn
- Sex: Mare
- Foaled: 1924
- Country: United Kingdom
- Colour: Bay
- Breeder: Giles Loder
- Owner: Giles Loder
- Trainer: Peter Gilpin
- Record: 9: 3-0-1

Major wins
- Imperial Produce Stakes (1926); 1000 Guineas (1927)

Cresta Run (1924 – 1939) was a British Thoroughbred racehorse and broodmare. As a two-year-old in 1926 she showed steady improvement, winning two of her i races including the valuable Imperial Produce Stakes. On her three-year-old debut she recorded a win in the 1000 Guineas but failed to reproduce her form in two subsequent races over longer distances. She had little immediate success as a broodmare but had a long-term influence on the breed though her daughter Gold Race.

== Background ==
Cresta Run was a bay mare bred and owned by Giles Loder who owned the Eyresfield Stud in County Kildare. Throughout her racing career she was trained by Peter Gilpin at his Clarehaven Stable in Newmarket, Suffolk. She was described as a "charming filly" with "well-developed quarters" and an "intelligent head".

She was from the sixth crop of foals sired by the unbeaten champion, Hurry On, making her a representative of the Godolphin Arabian sire line. Hurry On sired numerous other major winners including Captain Cuttle, Coronach, Call Boy, Pennycomequick and Precipitation. Cresta Run's dam Bridgemount also produced Foxbridge who was exported to New Zealand where he sired Hi Jinx and Foxzami.

== Racing career ==
=== 1926: two-year-old season ===
Cresta Run began her racing career by finishing unplaced behind Book Law in the Queen Mary Stakes at Royal Ascot in June. She was also unplaced in the National Breeders' Produce Stakes and then ran third in the Prince of Wales's Plate before recording her first success in the Highclere Nursery Handicap at Newbury Racecourse. On 8 October Cresta Run carried 127 pounds in the £3,797 Imperial Produce Stakes at Kempton Park Racecourse and won by three lengths from eleven opponents in a time of 1:13.00. At Newmarket Racecourse in later that month she was matched against male opposition in the Middle Park Stakes but finished unplaced behind the colt Call Boy.

Cresta Run ended the season with earnings of £4,880.

=== 1927: three-year-old season ===
The 114th running of 1000 Guineas over the Rowley Mile on 29 April attracted a field of twenty-eight runners and Cresta Run, ridden by Arthur Balding, started at odds of 10/1. She appeared somewhat nervous and agitated in the paddock before the race but started well and immediately assumed the lead. She was never seriously challenged and won the race with "ridiculous ease" by two lengths from Book Law and Endowment, who dead-heated for second place. Her winning time of 1:38.0 was 0.2 seconds faster than that recorded by Adam's Apple in the 2000 Guineas over the same course.

In the Oaks Stakes over one and a half miles at Epsom Racecourse Cresta Run started 3/1 second favourite behind Book Law. The large, noisy crowd, high temperatures and three false starts led her to become very upset and after being left behind the other fillies at the start she finished last of the sixteen runners in a race won by Beam. Later that summer she was beaten by Cinq a Sept in the Irish Oaks.

== Assessment and honours ==
In their book, A Century of Champions, based on the Timeform rating system, John Randall and Tony Morris rated Cresta Run an "average" winner of the 1000 Guineas.

== Breeding record ==
Cresta Run was retired from racing to become a broodmare. Gold Race had little success as a racehorse but had considerable influence as a broodmare, with her female-line descendants including Jupiter Island, Precocious and Grand Lodge.

- Gold Race, a brown filly, foaled in 1930, sired by Colorado
- Breadcrust, a bay colt sired by Manna
- Windy Ridge, chestnut gelding, 1937, sired by Apelle (also called Cresta Run gelding)

Cresta Run died in 1939 after foaling stillborn twins.

== Pedigree ==
Pedigree of Cresta Run (GB), bay mare, 1924
Sire Hurry On (GB) 1913	Marcovil (GB); 1903	Marco	Barcaldine
Sire Hurry On (GB) 1913	Marcovil (GB); 1903	Marco	Novitiate
Sire Hurry On (GB) 1913	Marcovil (GB); 1903	Lady Villikins	Hagioscope
Sire Hurry On (GB) 1913	Marcovil (GB); 1903	Lady Villikins	Dinah
Sire Hurry On (GB) 1913	Toute Suite (GB); 1904	Sainfoin	Springfield
Sire Hurry On (GB) 1913	Toute Suite (GB); 1904	Sainfoin	Sanda
Sire Hurry On (GB) 1913	Toute Suite (GB); 1904	Star	Thurio
Sire Hurry On (GB) 1913	Toute Suite (GB); 1904	Star	Meteor
Dam Bridgemount (IRE) 1919	Bridge of Earn (GB); 1906	Cyllene	Bona Vista
Dam Bridgemount (IRE) 1919	Bridge of Earn (GB); 1906	Cyllene	Arcadia
Dam Bridgemount (IRE) 1919	Bridge of Earn (GB); 1906	Santa Brigida	St Simon
Dam Bridgemount (IRE) 1919	Bridge of Earn (GB); 1906	Santa Brigida	Bridget
Dam Bridgemount (IRE) 1919	Mountain Mint (IRE); 1909	Spearmint (GB)	Carbine (NZ)
Dam Bridgemount (IRE) 1919	Mountain Mint (IRE); 1909	Spearmint (GB)	Maid of the Mint
Dam Bridgemount (IRE) 1919	Mountain Mint (IRE); 1909	Adula	Gallinule (GB)
Dam Bridgemount (IRE) 1919	Mountain Mint (IRE); 1909	Adula	Admiration (GB) (Family 14-b)
