= Scuttle (horse) =

British-bred Thoroughbred racehorse

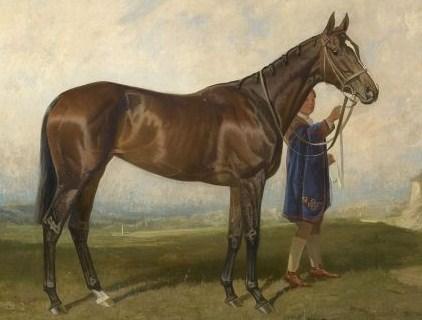
- Painting of Scuttle by James Lynwood Palmer
- Sire: Captain Cuttle
- Grandsire: Hurry On
- Dam: Stained Glass
- Damsire: Tracery
- Sex: Mare
- Foaled: 1925
- Country: United Kingdom
- Colour: Bay
- Breeder: King George V
- Owner: King George V
- Trainer: Willie Jarvis
- Record: 10: 5-3-1

Major wins
- Cheveley Park Stakes (1927); 1000 Guineas (1928)

Scuttle (1925 – March 1934) was a British Thoroughbred racehorse and broodmare. She showed considerable promise as a two-year-old in 1925 when she won three races including the Cheveley Park Stakes as well as finishing second in the Queen Mary Stakes. In the following spring she won on her seasonal debut and then recorded a popular and impressive victory in the 1000 Guineas. In her subsequent races she finished second in the Epsom Oaks, third in the Coronation Stakes and second in the Nassau Stakes. She was then retired to become a broodmare but died in 1934 at the age of nine. She was the first and only classic winner owned by King George V.

== Background ==
Scuttle was a bay mare with a narrow white blaze bred at the Royal Stud at Sandringham by Major Fetherstonhaugh on behalf of King George V. She was sent into training with William Rose "Willie" Jarvis at his Egerton House stable in Newmarket, Suffolk.

She was from the first crop of foals sired by Captain Cuttle, who won the Epsom Derby in 1922, making her a representative of the Godolphin Arabian sire line. Captain Cuttle's subsequent stud career was disappointing and Scuttle was his only classic winner. Scuttle's dam Stained Glass showed promise but fractured her pelvis in a training gallop and it was only after lengthy rest and treatment that she was saved for broodmare duty. She was a great-granddaughter of Stone Clink, a top-class racemare who won the Northumberland Plate and the Cesarewitch Handicap in 1886.

== Racing career ==
=== 1927: two-year-old season ===
On 20 May 1927 Scuttle was well-supported in the betting for the Fitzwilliam Stakes at Doncaster and won from eight opponents. She looked to be an unlucky loser when running second to Stadacona in the Queen Mary Stakes at Royal Ascot before winning the Berkshire Foal Plate at Newbury Racecourse.

In October she was ridden by Joe Childs in the Cheveley Park Stakes and won at odds of 5/1 from Tetrill. On her final start of the season she finished unplaced in the Wilbraham Stakes at Newmarket.

She ended the year with a record of three wins in five races and earnings of £2,947.

=== 1928: three-year-old season ===
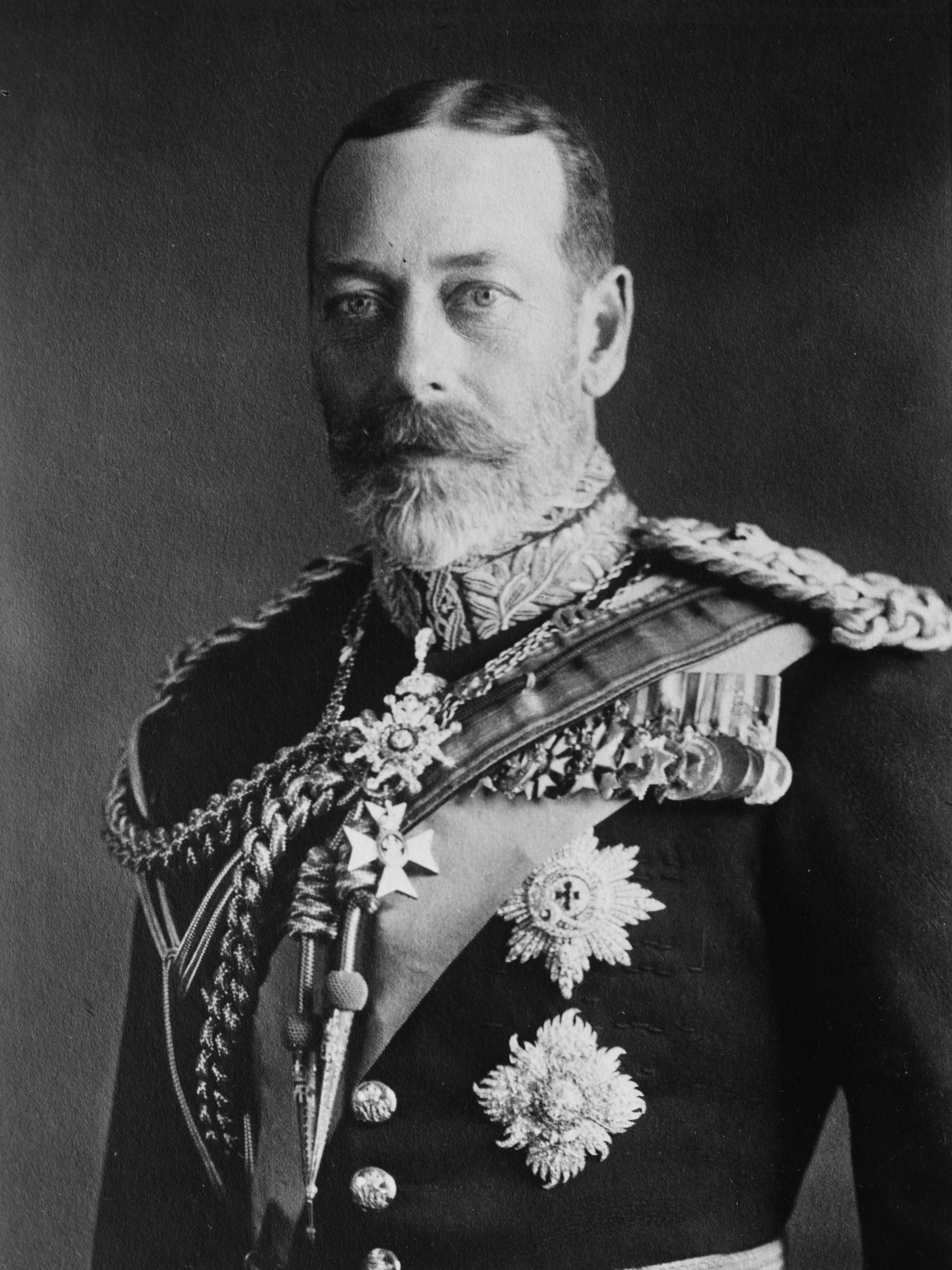
King George V, who bred and owned Scuttle

In the early spring of 1928 Scuttle was reported to be underweight and lacking in appetite but recovered after receiving "ultra-violet ray treatment" from the Jockey Club's veterinary surgeon Mr V. Pryde-Jones. The filly began her second season by winning the Brandon Handicap over nine furlongs at Newmarket in April. On 4 May, with Childs in the saddle, Scuttle contested the 115th running of the 1000 Guineas over the Rowley Mile and started at the 15/8 favourite against thirteen runners. The crowd at Newmarket included her owner the King and the Prince of Wales. The filly looked restless before the start and when the contest began she was left behind the other runners before settling towards the rear of the field. Grand Vixen set the early pace before giving way to Jurisdiction two furlongs out, at which point the favourite began to make rapid progress. Scuttle moved alongside Jurisdiction entering the final furlong and then "forged ahead" to win amid loud cheering and cries of "the King wins!" by a length with a gap of six lengths back to Lord Derby's Toboggan in third. Childs, who was given great credit for his calm and intelligent ride, commented "I knew this would come. I was in no hurry, especially as [she] is a good stayer".

Scuttle was stepped up in distance at Epsom Racecourse on 8 of June and started favourite for the Oaks Stakes over one and half miles. She tracked Toboggan for most of the way but was unable to make any impression on her rival in the straight and finished second, beaten four lengths by the winner. At Royal Ascot late that month, Scuttle was dropped back in distance for the one-mile Coronation Stakes and finished third behind Toboggan and the lightly-weighted outsider Romany Queen. At Goodwood Racecourse in late July or early August, she was beaten in the ten-furlong Nassau Stakes by the Alec Taylor Jr.-trained La Sologne, to whom she was conceding sixteen pounds in weight.

== Assessment and honours ==
In their book, A Century of Champions, based on the Timeform rating system, John Randall and Tony Morris rated Scuttle an "inferior" winner of the 1000 Guineas.

== Breeding record ==
At the end of her racing career, Scuttle was retired to become a broodmare at the Royal Stud. She produced at least two live foals:

- Fairlead, a bay filly, foaled in 1932, sired by Fairway.
- Canvas, bay filly, 1933, by Solario.

In March 1934 Scuttle developed a rupture after producing a filly-foal by Singapore. A haemorrhage ensued and despite the attendance of a leading veterinary surgeon, she died shortly afterwards.

== Pedigree ==
Pedigree of Scuttle (GB), bay mare, 1925
Sire Captain Cuttle (GB) 1919	Hurry On (GB); 1913	Marcovil	Marco
Sire Captain Cuttle (GB) 1919	Hurry On (GB); 1913	Marcovil	Lady Villikins
Sire Captain Cuttle (GB) 1919	Hurry On (GB); 1913	Toute Suite	Sainfoin
Sire Captain Cuttle (GB) 1919	Hurry On (GB); 1913	Toute Suite	Star
Sire Captain Cuttle (GB) 1919	Bellavista (GB); 1904	Cyllene	Bona Vista
Sire Captain Cuttle (GB) 1919	Bellavista (GB); 1904	Cyllene	Arcadia
Sire Captain Cuttle (GB) 1919	Bellavista (GB); 1904	Emotion	Nunthorpe
Sire Captain Cuttle (GB) 1919	Bellavista (GB); 1904	Emotion	Emita
Dam Stained Glass (GB) 1917	Tracery (USA); 1909	Rock Sand (GB)	Sainfoin
Dam Stained Glass (GB) 1917	Tracery (USA); 1909	Rock Sand (GB)	Roquebrune
Dam Stained Glass (GB) 1917	Tracery (USA); 1909	Topiary (GB)	Orme
Dam Stained Glass (GB) 1917	Tracery (USA); 1909	Topiary (GB)	Plaisanterie (FR)
Dam Stained Glass (GB) 1917	Saints Mead (GB); 1906	St Simon	Galopin
Dam Stained Glass (GB) 1917	Saints Mead (GB); 1906	St Simon	St Angela
Dam Stained Glass (GB) 1917	Saints Mead (GB); 1906	Meadow Chat	Minting
Dam Stained Glass (GB) 1917	Saints Mead (GB); 1906	Meadow Chat	Stone Clink (Family 16)

- Scuttle was inbred 4 × 4 to Sainfoin, meaning that this stallion appears twice in fourth generation of her pedigree.
