= Brownie Carslake =

English jockey

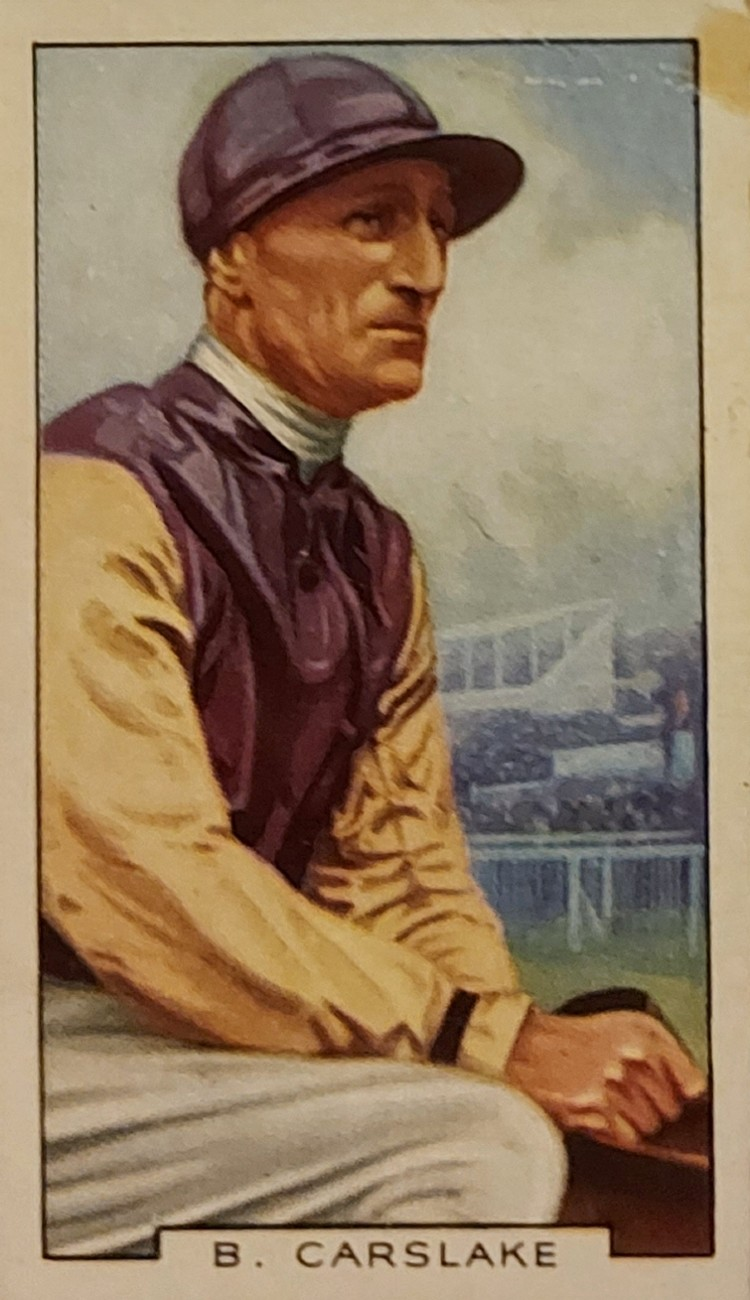
- Brownie Carslake in the colours of Lord Durham for whom he won the 1934 Oaks, from a 1936 Gallaher's cigarette card

Personal information
- Born: 14 July 1886 Caulfield, Victoria, Australia
- Died: 29 July 1941 (aged 55) Whitsbury, Hampshire, England
- Occupation: Jockey

Horse racing career
- Sport: Horse racing

Major racing wins
- British Classic Races: 2000 Guineas Stakes (1920); St Leger Stakes (1919, 1924, 1938); 1000 Guineas Stakes (1918, 1922); Oaks Stakes (1934); Other major races: Nunthorpe Stakes (1928, 1930, 1933); Middle Park Stakes (1918, 1919); July Cup (1921); Goodwood Cup (1938); Gold Cup (1927, 1928); Dewhurst Stakes (1919, 1922); Sussex Stakes (1921, 1923); St. James's Palace Stakes (1925, 1938)

Racing awards
- Austria-Hungary Champion Jockey; Russian Champion Jockey (1916)

Significant horses
- Concerto, Epigram, Ferry, Foxlaw, Hurry Off, Invershin, Keysoe, Light Brocade, Prince Galahad, Salmon-Trout, Scottish Union, Silver Urn, Stefan the Great, Sunblaze, Tag End, Tetratema, Zambo
- Updated on 22 October 2023

Bernard "Brownie" Carslake (14 July 1886 - 29 July 1941) was an Australian-born, but mainly England-based, flat racing jockey, who in a career of over three decades won every British Classic except the Derby, as well as becoming champion jockey of Austria-Hungary and Russia. He was ranked 12th in the Racing Post jockeys of the 20th Century.

== Career ==
Bernard Brantham Carslake was born in the Melbourne suburb of Caulfield on 14 July 1886. He earned the nickname "Brownie" because of his pale complexion, which he put down to years of "existing on a cup of tea and hope". He had "a Saturnine air" with "piercing black eyes", an "aquiline nose" and "severely brushed-back black hair".

He was taught to ride by his father, I. T. Carslake, and never officially became an apprentice. His first winner was Lady Watkins at an Australian bush meeting. Once, as a 12 year old, he won three races on the same horse in two days. His first major wins in his native country were in 1904, when he won the Adelaide Cup and the VRC Oaks. In 1905 he added the Doncaster Handicap, the VRC Sires Produce Stakes and the Kalgoorlie Cup. He first moved to England for a short visit in 1906, where his first winner was The Swagman at Birmingham.

When World War I began, he was in Austria-Hungary, where he was champion jockey, and fled to Romania disguised as a railway fireman. In Bucharest, he rode for a man named Niculescu and was settled enough to bring his wife over from England. From there, he fled to Russia, where he also became champion jockey in 1916. He fled back to England as a result of the Russian Revolution, bringing with him a large amount of roubles, which were worthless in Britain.

Back in England he won three St Legers, two 1,000 Guineas, two Ascot Gold Cups, a 2,000 Guineas and an Oaks over a period of 20 years, riding for Atty Persse, George Lambton and others. He never won the Derby. Tetratema, his 1920 2,000 Guineas winner failed to stay the distance, and the closest he came to winning were three placed efforts. He was runner up in the Jockeys' Championship in 1918 and 1919 to Steve Donoghue who had the advantage of being able to ride at 8 stone compared to Carslake's near 9.

His 1924 St Leger victory was the subject of controversy. He was riding the Aga Khan III's horse Salmon Trout, who after winning the Princess of Wales's Stakes should have been favourite, but drifted wildly in the weeks before the race. It was implied that Carslake was part of a plot to ensure the horse's defeat and the Doncaster stewards warned the jockey they were watching his riding. In the event, Salmon Trout showed a terrific burst of speed one furlong from home, to pass Santorb and win by two lengths. The bookmakers who had been laying the horse in the preceding weeks lost heavily. Many years later, he admitted to a journalist that he hadn't thought the horse would get the distance and so had advised a bookmaker friend to lay the horse.

In April 1927, riding a horse called Birthright at Newmarket, the colt bolted and covered 10 miles before Carslake was able to pull it up. The following April, he was unable to ride due to a poisoned leg. He first retired as a jockey that year, after fasting had begun to take its toll and his abilities were in decline. For a while, he became a trainer, only to return to riding. In 1940, he won by a short head on Ipswich at Alexandra Park, but he collapsed in the weighing room shortly afterwards. This was diagnosed as serious heart disease, forcing his immediate retirement. He did not enjoy this, complaining that "the monotony is dreadful, having nothing to do except read the paper and dream of great times in the past." He died from his heart problems on 29 July 1941 aged 55 in Whitsbury near Salisbury. He left an estate of £1,417 14s. 5d and his ashes were scattered at his request over Newmarket's Rowley Mile, by permission of the stewards.

== Riding style ==
Carslake was tall and big-boned but it has been said that he was one of the most stylish inter-war jockeys. This was noticed as early as his Austria-Hungary days, when a Viennese newspaper commented, "He has an exceptionally fine pair of hands and a still finer head on his shoulders". Trainer Frank Butters said Carslake was the best jockey he had known with "the greatest pair of hands in the world."

He became the first Australian jockey to adopt the short leather Tod Sloan style of riding. He was immensely strong in a finish, and characteristically, he liked to come late. He was only able to use his whip in his left hand and kept his horses balanced with the strength of his legs.

Among his best rides were Foxlaw in the 1927 Ascot Gold Cup and Epigram in the 1938 Doncaster Cup, but his trainer Lambton believed his best performance was on the mare Diadem in the 1918 Salford Borough Handicap at Manchester when he pipped two horses on the line to whom he was giving between two and three stone. "She was a tired mare a hundred yards from home and Carslake fairly lifted her past the post. Although he had never hit her, she had given every ounce."

Carslake preferred courses with wide-open spaces like Newmarket and Doncaster to twistier courses like Epsom, Alexandra Park, Brighton and Goodwood where his record was much poorer. One journalist said his preference for straightforward tracks was a bigger limitation on his success than his weight. Newmarket was his absolute favourite - "there is no racecourse in the whole world like Newmarket," he told Australian reporters. "No jockey who has ever ridden in England would ever want to leave England". He had a sardonic wit and according to journalist Quintin Gilbey "could make you feel you were something the cat had brought in".

== Other sports ==
Carslake was also a good cricketer, being a useful right-handed batsman and slow left-arm bowler. He also boxed. In the 1922 Jockey Boxing Championship he helped raise over £5,000 for Sussex County Hospital when defeating J. Evans.

== Personal life ==
Carslake was a stylish dresser, with impeccable manners and an ability to mix easily with any level of society. For that reason, he gained the nickname "Gentleman Cavalier". He married Annie Langley on 13 November 1907 at the Church of St John the Evangelist, Leeds. Annie was later granted an uncontested divorce on grounds of infidelity. She had seen her husband living with another woman in Bradford. He admitted infidelity in 1930 and they separated in 1931.

In May 1930, Carslake was fined £10 for dangerous driving and ignoring police signals. The police had to chase the jockey a long distance.

== Major wins ==
(United Kingdom) Great Britain

- Nunthorpe Stakes - (3) - Tag End (1928), Tag End (1930), Concerto (1933)
- Middle Park Stakes - (2) - Stefan the Great (1918), Tetratema (1919)
- 2000 Guineas Stakes - Tetratema (1920)
- St Leger Stakes - (3) - Keysoe (1919), Salmon-Trout (1924), Scottish Union (1938)
- July Cup - Tetratema (1921)
- Goodwood Cup - Epigram (1938)
- 1000 Guineas Stakes - (2) - Ferry (1918), Silver Urn (1922)
- Gold Cup - (2) - Foxlaw (1927), Invershin (1928)
- Oaks Stakes - Light Brocade (1934)
- Dewhurst Stakes - (2) - Prince Galahad (1919), Hurry Off (1922)
- Sussex Stakes - (2) - Sunblaze (1921), Hurry Off (1923)
- St. James's Palace Stakes - (2) - Zambo (1925), Scottish Union (1938)

== See also ==
- List of jockeys

== Bibliography ==
- Mortimer, Roger; Onslow, Richard; Willett, Peter (1978). Biographical Encyclopaedia of British Racing. London: Macdonald and Jane's. ISBN 0-354-08536-0.
- Wright, Howard (1986). The Encyclopaedia of Flat Racing. London: Robert Hale. ISBN 0-7090-2639-0.
- Tanner, Michael; Cranham, Gerry (1992). Great Jockeys of the Flat. Enfield, Middlesex: Guinness Publishing. ISBN 0-85112-989-7.
