= Masaka (horse) =

Irish-bred Thoroughbred racehorse

- Sire: Nearco
- Grandsire: Pharos
- Dam: Majideh
- Damsire: Mahmoud
- Sex: Mare
- Foaled: 1945
- Country: Ireland
- Colour: Bay
- Breeder: Aga Khan III
- Owner: Aga Khan III
- Trainer: Frank Butters
- Record: 10: 6-0-1
- Earnings: £21,996

Major wins
- Queen Mary Stakes (1947); July Stakes (1947); Epsom Oaks (1948); Irish Oaks (1948)

Awards
- Timeform rating 126 (1947)

Honours
- Timeform best two-year-old filly (1947); Masaka Stakes at Kempton Park

Masaka (1945 – after 1969) was an Irish-bred, British-trained Thoroughbred racehorse and broodmare. She was one of the best fillies of her generation in Europe in 1947 when she won three races including the Queen Mary Stakes and the July Stakes. In the following year she became increasingly temperamental and refused to start on more than one occasion but did show top class form over middle distances, winning the Epsom Oaks and the Irish Oaks.

After her retirement Masaka became a successful broodmare in Ireland before being sold for a record price and exported to the United States. She made an enduring impact through her daughter Bara Bibi, a very influential broodmare.

== Background ==
Masaka was a bay mare with white socks on her hind legs bred in Ireland by her owner Aga Khan III. She was sent to England and entered training with Frank Butters at the Fitzroy House stable in Newmarket, Suffolk.

She was sired by Nearco, an undefeated Italian champion who went on to become one of the most important sires of the 20th century. Masaka's dam Majideh was a high-class racemare who won the Irish 1,000 Guineas and Irish Oaks for the Aga Khan in 1942. As a broodmare she also produced the Belmont Stakes winner Gallant Man and was subsequently exported to the United States.

== Racing career ==
=== 1947: two-year-old season ===
Masaka began her racing career as a juvenile in 1947 and made an immediate impact. At Royal Ascot in June she was ridden by Charlie Smirke in the Queen Mary Stakes over five furlongs and won from her stablemate Open Sesame at odds of 4/1. In the following month she was moved upin distance and matched against male opposition in the July Stakes at Newmarket Racecourse. With Gordon Richards in the saddle she started 5/6 favourite and won from the Chesham Stakes winner Djeride.

=== 1948: three-year-old season ===
Masaka began her second season with a very easy win in the 1000 Guineas Trial Stakes at Kempton Park Racecourse in April. In the 1000 Guineas over the Rowley Mile course at Newmarket she was ridden by Ken Gethin and started 9/4 favourite in a twenty-two runner field. She refused to start with the other fillies, giving her rivals a long start before finally agreeing to race and finishing unplaced behind the Noel Murless-trained Queenpot.

Billy Nevett took the ride when the filly contested the 170th running of the Oaks Stakes over one and a half miles at Epsom Racecourse on 3 June. When asked about his filly's chances the Aga Khan said "If she starts and is not left at the post she will win by lengths. And you can't tell if she will start at all". She started at odds of 7/1 against twenty-four rivals including the King's filly Angelola, winner of the (Lingfield Oaks Trial). Racing in heavy rain, Masaka took the lead early in the straight and drew away to win easily by six lengths from Angelola, with a gap of three lengths back to Folie in third place.

In June she was dropped back in distance for the Coronation Stakes but her temperament problems resurfaced and she refused to race. She was then sent to Ireland and won the Irish Oaks at the Curragh in July.

== Assessment and honours ==
The independent Timeform organisation gave Masaka a rating of 126 for the 1947 season, making her their top-rated juvenile filly. In their book, A Century of Champions, based on the Timeform rating system, John Randall and Tony Morris rated Masaka an "average" winner of the Oaks. The Masaka Stakes, a Listed race run at Kempton in April, was named in her honour.

== Breeding record ==
At the end of her racing career, Masaka was retired to become a broodmare at her owner's Irish stud. In 1954 she was sent to the United States where she was auctioned at Keeneland and sold for a then record price of $105,000. She produced at least eleven foals and six winners between 1951 and 1969:

- Bara Bibi, a bay filly, foaled in 1951, sired by Bois Roussel. Won the Park Hill Stakes. She later became an influential broodmare whose descendants have included Kahyasi, Lashkari, Milan and Kastoria.
- Mafiya, filly, 1952, by Migoli. Failed to win a race.
- Princese Saka, filly, 1953, by Prince Chevalier. Failed to win a race.
- Palsaka, grey filly, 1954, by Palestine. Won one race. Dam of Silver Shark (Prix de l'Abbaye, Prix d'Ispahan, Prix du Moulin)
- Cross County, bay colt, 1958, by Ambiorix. Won nine races from 112 starts.
- Aquitania, bay colt (later gelded), 1959, by Ambiorix. Won eleven races; had his greatest success in steeplechases.
- Masakita, bay filly, 1960, by Princequillo. Failed to win a race.
- Native Pitt, bay colt, 1963, by Native Dancer. Won two races, placed in the Remsen Stakes.
- Highland Reel, chestnut filly, 1964, by Sword Dancer. Won two races.
- Global War, bay filly, 1967, by Globemaster. Unraced.
- Fill My Eyes, bay filly, 1969, by Vertex. Failed to win a race.

== Pedigree ==
Pedigree of Masaka (IRE), bay mare, 1945
Sire Nearco (ITY) 1935	Pharos (GB); 1920	Phalaris	Polymelus
Sire Nearco (ITY) 1935	Pharos (GB); 1920	Phalaris	Bromus
Sire Nearco (ITY) 1935	Pharos (GB); 1920	Scapa Flow	Chaucer
Sire Nearco (ITY) 1935	Pharos (GB); 1920	Scapa Flow	Anchora
Sire Nearco (ITY) 1935	Nogara (ITY); 1928	Havresac (FR)	Rabelais (GB)
Sire Nearco (ITY) 1935	Nogara (ITY); 1928	Havresac (FR)	Hors Concours
Sire Nearco (ITY) 1935	Nogara (ITY); 1928	Catnip (IRE)	Spearmint (GB)
Sire Nearco (ITY) 1935	Nogara (ITY); 1928	Catnip (IRE)	Sibola (USA)
Dam Majideh (GB) 1939	Mahmoud (FR); 1933	Blenheim (GB)	Blandford (IRE)
Dam Majideh (GB) 1939	Mahmoud (FR); 1933	Blenheim (GB)	Malva
Dam Majideh (GB) 1939	Mahmoud (FR); 1933	Mah Mahal (GB)	Gainsborough
Dam Majideh (GB) 1939	Mahmoud (FR); 1933	Mah Mahal (GB)	Mumtaz Mahal
Dam Majideh (GB) 1939	Qurrat-Al-Ain (GB); 1927	Buchan	Sunstar
Dam Majideh (GB) 1939	Qurrat-Al-Ain (GB); 1927	Buchan	Hamoaze
Dam Majideh (GB) 1939	Qurrat-Al-Ain (GB); 1927	Harpsichord (IRE)	Louvois (GB)
Dam Majideh (GB) 1939	Qurrat-Al-Ain (GB); 1927	Harpsichord (IRE)	Golden Harp (Family 5-e)
