= Toboggan (horse) =

Thoroughbred racehorse

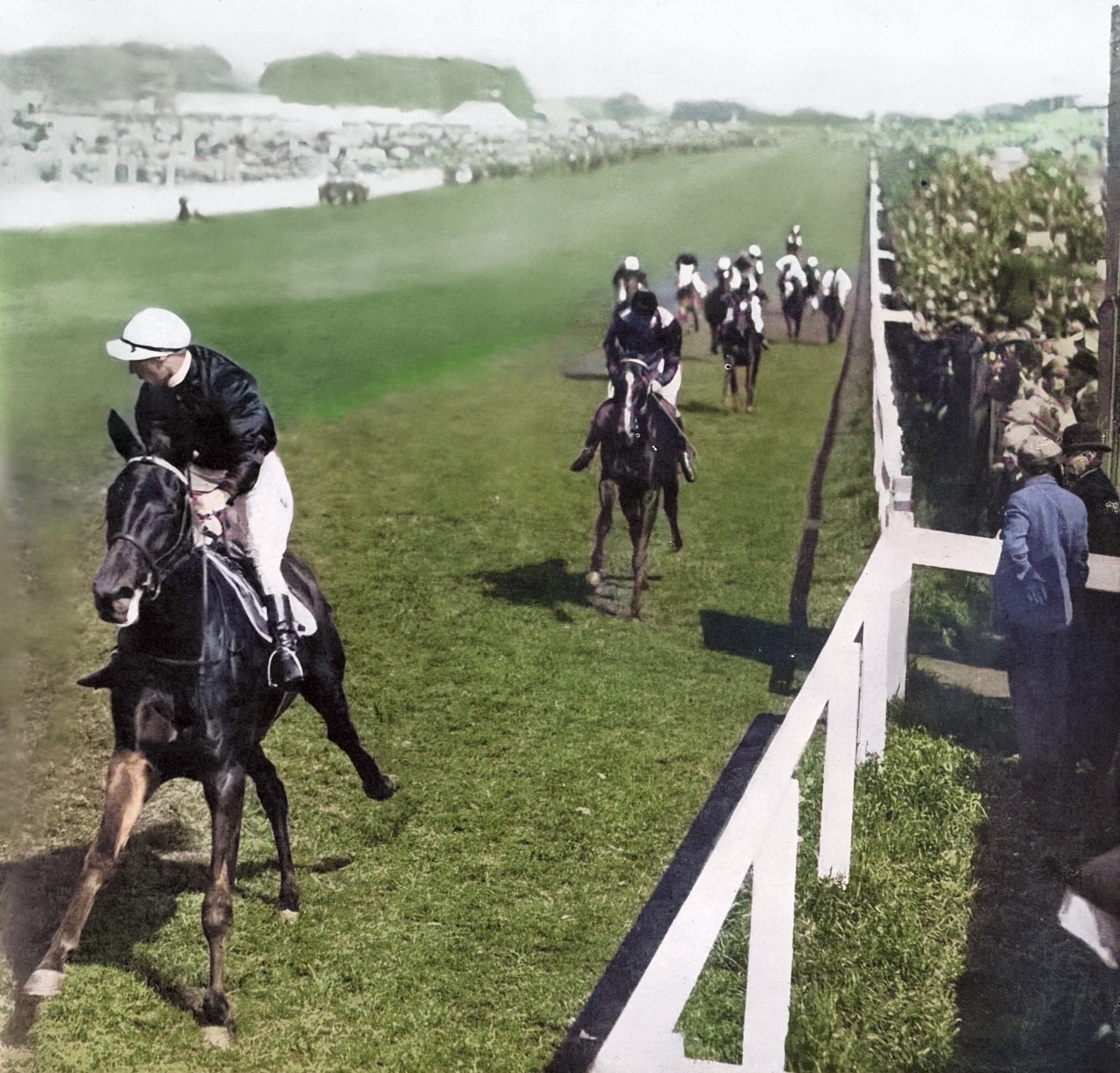
- Finish of the Oaks Stakes with Toboggan (left) leading Scuttle.
- Sire: Hurry On
- Grandsire: Marcovil
- Dam: Glacier
- Damsire: St Simon
- Sex: Mare
- Foaled: 1925
- Country: United Kingdom
- Colour: Bay
- Breeder: Lord Derby
- Owner: Lord Derby
- Trainer: Frank Butters
- Record: 8: 6-0-2
- Earnings: £25,050

Major wins
- Dewhurst Stakes (1927); Epsom Oaks (1928); Coronation Stakes (1928); Jockey Club Stakes (1928)

Toboggan (1925 – 1944) was a British Thoroughbred racehorse and broodmare. She showed very promising form as a juvenile in 1928 when she won three of her four races including the Dewhurst Stakes. In the following year she finished third in the 1000 Guineas and went on to win the Epsom Oaks, Coronation Stakes and Jockey Club Stakes. She had some success as a broodmare producing the top-class winner Bobsleigh and Hydroplane, the dam of Citation.

== Background ==
Toboggan was a bay mare bred in the United Kingdom by her owner Edward Stanley, 17th Earl of Derby. She was sent into training with Frank Butters at his Fitzroy House stable in Newmarket, Suffolk. She was ridden in most of her races by Tommy Weston.

She was from the seventh crop of foals sired by the unbeaten champion, Hurry On, making her a representative of the Godolphin Arabian sire line. Apart from Toboggan, Hurry On sired numerous major winners including Captain Cuttle, Coronach, Call Boy, Precipitation and Pennycomequick. Toboggan's dam Glacier was a half-sister to Canyon who won the 1000 Guineas and was the dam of Colorado.

== Racing career ==
=== 1927: two-year-old season ===
As a two-year-old in 1927 Toboggan finished third in a maiden race at Kempton Park Racecourse on her debut and then won the Champion Breeders Foal Plate at Derby Racecourse. In autumn at Newmarket Racecourse Toboggan was matched against male opposition won the Boscawen Plate. In the Dewhurst Stakes over seven furlongs at the same track she won again and won at odds of 4/9 despite carrying a seven pound weight penalty.

Toboggan ended the season with earnings of £3,528.

=== 1928: three-year-old season ===
On 4 of May Toboggan contested the 1000 Guineas over the Rowley Mile course at Newmarket. She finished third of the fourteen runners behind the King's filly Scuttle, who started the 15/8 favourite. At Epsom Racecourse on 8 of June Toboggan faced Scuttle again in the 150th edition of the Oaks Stakes and started at odds of 100/15 (approximately 6.7/1) in a thirteen-runner field. Toboggan took the lead at least six furlongs from the finish, steadily increased her advantage in the straight and came home four lengths clear of Scuttle with a gap of six lengths back to Flegere in third place.

Toboggan was dropped back in distance for the Coronation Stakes at Royal Ascot. Starting at odds of 11/10 she won from Scuttle and Romany Queen. On 4 October Toboggan was matched against older horse in the Jockey Club Stakes over fourteen furlongs at Newmarket. She won by two lengths from four-year-old colt Bonny Bay at odds of 3/1. At the end of the season Lord Derby explained that both Toboggan and his leading colt Fairway had been successfully subjected to a process of "electric light treatment".

In the 1928 season, Toboggan won £21,522.

== Assessment and honours ==
In their book, A Century of Champions, based on the Timeform rating system, John Randall and Tony Morris rated Toboggan a "superior" winner of the Oaks and the best filly of her generation trained in Britain or Ireland.

== Breeding record ==
At the end of her racing career Toboggan was retired to become a broodmare for Lord Derby's stud. She produced at least eight foals between 1930 and 1941:

- Moccasin, a filly, foaled in 1930, sired by Phalaris
- Bobsleigh, chestnut colt, 1932, by Gainsborough. Won Richmond Stakes and Newmarket Stakes.
- Pendola, filly, 1933, by Felstead
- Colours Flying, bay filly, 1934, by Gainsborough
- Mont Angel, colt, 1937, by Fairway
- Hydroplane, chestnut filly, 1938, by Hyperion. Dam of Citation.
- Evenlode, bay filly, 1939, by Hyperion
- Winter Sport, bay filly, 1941, by Hyperion

Toboggan produced no live foals after 1941 and was euthanised in 1944.

== Pedigree ==
Pedigree of Toboggan (GB), bay mare, 1925
Sire Hurry On (GB) 1913	Marcovil (GB); 1903	Marco	Barcaldine (IRE)
Sire Hurry On (GB) 1913	Marcovil (GB); 1903	Marco	Novitiate
Sire Hurry On (GB) 1913	Marcovil (GB); 1903	Lady Villikins	Hagioscope
Sire Hurry On (GB) 1913	Marcovil (GB); 1903	Lady Villikins	Dinah
Sire Hurry On (GB) 1913	Toute Suite (GB); 1904	Sainfoin	Springfield
Sire Hurry On (GB) 1913	Toute Suite (GB); 1904	Sainfoin	Sanda
Sire Hurry On (GB) 1913	Toute Suite (GB); 1904	Star	Thurio
Sire Hurry On (GB) 1913	Toute Suite (GB); 1904	Star	Meteor
Dam Glacier (GB) 1907	St Simon (GB); 1881	Galopin	Vedette
Dam Glacier (GB) 1907	St Simon (GB); 1881	Galopin	Flying Duchess
Dam Glacier (GB) 1907	St Simon (GB); 1881	St Angela	King Tom
Dam Glacier (GB) 1907	St Simon (GB); 1881	St Angela	Adeline
Dam Glacier (GB) 1907	Glasalt (GB); 1898	Isinglass	Isonomy
Dam Glacier (GB) 1907	Glasalt (GB); 1898	Isinglass	Dead Lock
Dam Glacier (GB) 1907	Glasalt (GB); 1898	Broad Corrie	Hampton
Dam Glacier (GB) 1907	Glasalt (GB); 1898	Broad Corrie	Corrie Roy (Family 3-1)
