= All Things Equal =

Café in Melbourne, Australia

Restaurant information
- Established: January 2021
- Owner: Jess Colgan
- Managers: Bianca Stern; Jessica Rastelli
- Head chef: Mavi Nobong
- Location: 263-265 Carlisle St, Balaclava VIC 3183, Australia
- Website: allthingsequal.com.au

All Things Equal is a social enterprise cafe based in Melbourne, Australia.

It is located in the suburb of Balaclava in the city's south-east.

== Description ==
The venue is known, in part, for its employment of people with disabilities. Around half of its staff have a disability of some form.

It is a registered charity, and a form of social enterprise. It employs around 14 staff.

It is located in the suburb of Balaclava in the city's south-east, an area known for having many members of Melbourne's jewish community. It has a kosher menu. The cafe was founded by a number of well-known members of Melbourne's Jewish community, including Jonathan Wenig; a partner at Arnold Bloch Leibler. One of Wenig's daughters has autism, and his experience as a father in-part motivated his opening of the restaurant.

It also runs a community cafe at Princes Park Caulfield in association with the AJAX Junior Football Club.

== See also ==
- Embla
