= Coronation Stakes =

Flat horse race in Britain

- Class: Group 1
- Location: Ascot Racecourse; Ascot, England
- Inaugurated: 1840
- Race type: Flat / Thoroughbred
- Website: Ascot

Race information
- Distance: 7f 213y (1,603 metres)
- Surface: Turf
- Track: Right-handed
- Qualification: Three-year-old fillies
- Weight: 9 st 2 lb
- Purse: £725,750 (2025); 1st: £411,573

Coronation Stakes
2026
Precise	Touleen	True Love

Previous years
2025
Cercene	Zarigana	January
2024
Porta Fortuna	Opera Singer	Ramatuelle
2023
Tahiyra	Remarquee	Sounds Of Heaven
2022
Inspiral	Spendarella	Discoveries
2021
Alcohol Free	Snow Lantern	Mother Earth

2020-2011
2020
Alpine Star	Sharing	Quadrilateral
2019
Watch Me	Hermosa	Jubiloso
2018
Alpha Centauri	Threading	Veracious
2017
Winter	Roly Poly	Hydrangea
2016
Qemah	Nemoralia	Alice Springs
2015
Ervedya	Found	Lucida
2014
Rizeena	Lesstalk In Paris	Euro Charline
2013
Sky Lantern	Kenhope	Just The Judge
2012
Fallen For You	Starscope	Irish History
2011
Immortal Verse	Nova Hawk	Barefoot Lady

2010–2001
2010
Lillie Langtry	Gile Na Greine	Jacqueline Quest
2009
Ghanaati	Reggane	Rainbow View
2008
Lush Lashes	Infallible	Caribbean Sunset
2007
Indian Ink	Mi Emma	Darjina
2006
Nannina	Flashy Wings	Nasheej
2005
Maids Causeway	Karen's Caper	Mona Lisa
2004
Attraction	Majestic Desert	Red Bloom
2003
Russian Rhythm	Soviet Song	Mail The Desert
2002
Sophisticat	Zenda	Dolores
2001
Banks Hill	Crystal Music	Tempting Fate

2000–1991
2000
Crimplene	Princess Ellen	Bluemamba
1999
Balisada	Golden Silca	Valentine Waltz
1998
Exclusive	Zalaiyka	Winona
1997
Rebecca Sharp	Ocean Ridge	Sleepytime
1996
Shake the Yoke	Last Second	Dance Design
1995
Ridgewood Pearl	Smolensk	Harayir
1994
Kissing Cousin	Eternal Reve	Mehthaaf
1993
Gold Splash	Elizabeth Bay	Zarani Sidi Anna
1992
Marling	Culture Vulture	Katakana
1991
Kooyonga	Shadayid	Gussy Marlowe

1990–1988
1990
Chimes Of Freedom	Hasbah	Heart Of Joy
1989
Golden Opinion	Magic Gleam	Guest Artiste
1988
Magic Of Life	Inchmurrin	Ravinella

The Coronation Stakes is a Group 1 flat horse race in Great Britain open to three-year-old fillies. It is run at Ascot over a distance of 7 furlong and 213 yards (1,603 metres), and it is scheduled to take place each year in June.

== History ==
The event was established in 1840, and its title commemorates the coronation of a new British monarch, Queen Victoria, two years earlier.

The present system of race grading was introduced in 1971, and for a period the Coronation Stakes held Group 2 status. It was promoted to Group 1 level in 1988.

The Coronation Stakes is now contested on the fourth day of the five-day Royal Ascot meeting. It usually features fillies which ran previously in the 1,000 Guineas, the Poule d'Essai des Pouliches or the Irish 1,000 Guineas. The most recent filly to follow up a win in one of those races with victory in the Coronation Stakes was Precise, the 2026 Irish 1,000 Guineas winner.

== Records ==
Leading jockey (5 wins):

- Nat Flatman – The Princess (1844), Stitch (1845), Distaffina (1848), Lady Evelyn (1849), Barcelona (1851)
- Morny Cannon – Lady Hermit (1892), Silene (1893), Throstle (1894), Helm (1896), Lowood (1898)

Leading trainer (6 wins):

- John Porter – Lovely (1883), Sandiway (1884), Cereza (1891), Throstle (1894), Helm (1896), Lowood (1898)

Leading owner (7 wins):

- Waldorf Astor, 2nd Viscount Astor – Winkipop (1910), Pogrom (1922), Saucy Sue (1925), Book Law (1927), Sunny Devon (1931), Betty (1933), Traffic Light (1936)

== Winners since 1900 ==
Year	Winner	Jockey	Trainer	Owner	Time
1900 (dh)	Sainte Nitouche; Winifreda	Fred Rickaby; Thomas Weldon	Harry Enoch; Tom Jennings Jr.	Leonard Brassey
1901	Bella Gallina	William Halsey	Peter Gilpin
1902	Doctrine	William Halsey	Fred Day		1:52.00
1903	Oriole
1904	Pretty Polly	Willie Lane	Peter Gilpin	Eustace Loder
1905	Commune	Frank Hardy	Weston Goodwin
1906	Keystone II	Danny Maher	George Lambton	Lord Derby
1907	Frugality	Herbert Jones	Willie Waugh		1:45.80
1908	Lesbia	Danny Maher	George Blackwell		1:46.80
1909	Princesse de Galles	Herbert Jones	Richard Marsh
1910	Winkipop	Herbert Jones	Willie Waugh	Lord Astor
1911	Knockfeerna	Walter Griggs	Peter Gilpin
1912	Polkerris	Frank Wootton	Charles Peck
1913	Prue	Danny Maher	Willie Pratt		1:41.80
1914	Wassilissa	Steve Donoghue	Richard Dawson		1:43.40
1915–18	No Race
1919	Flying Spear	Joe Childs	Alec Taylor Jr.
1920	Cinna	William Griggs	Tom Waugh	Sir Robert Jardine
1921	Donna Branca	Frank Bullock	Basil Jarvis		1:41.60
1922	Pogrom	Bernard Carslake	Alec Taylor Jr.	Lord Astor
1923	Paola	Vic Smyth	Richard Dawson		1:42.60
1924	Straitlace	Charlie Elliott	Dawson Waugh	Edward Hulton	1:48.40
1925	Saucy Sue	Frank Bullock	Alec Taylor Jr.	Lord Astor	1:43.00
1926	Moti Mahal	Charlie Smirke	Richard Dawson		1:49.40
1927	Book Law	Henri Jelliss	Alec Taylor Jr.	Lord Astor	1:42.80
1928	Toboggan	Tommy Weston	Frank Butters	Lord Derby	1:46.80
1929	Daumont	Freddie Fox	Fred Darling		1:46.40
1930	Qurrat-al-Ain	Michael Beary	Richard Dawson		1:49.00
1931	Sunny Devon	Bobby Dick	Joseph Lawson	Lord Astor	1:46.40
1932	Udaipur	Michael Beary	Frank Butters	Aga Khan III	1:42.80
1933	Betty	Bobby Dick	Joseph Lawson	Lord Astor	1:43.80
1934	Foxcroft	Joe Childs	Cecil Boyd-Rochfort	M Field	1:43.60
1935	Ankaret	Freddie Fox	Fred Butters	Mrs G B Miller	1:47.00
1936	Traffic Light	Bobby Dick	Joseph Lawson	Lord Astor	1:43.40
1937	Gainsborough Lass	Eph Smith	Jack Jarvis	Sir John Jarvis	1:44.60
1938	Solar Flower	Gordon Richards	Frank Butters	Sir A Butt	1:41.60
1939	Olein	Tommy Lowrey	Basil Jarvis	Lord Glanely	1:44.80
1940–45	No Race
1946	Neolight	Gordon Richards	Fred Darling	J A Dewar	1:49.20
1947	Saucy Sal	Rae Johnstone	Herbert Blagrave	Mrs H G Blagrave	1:45.40
1948	Fortuity (Note: Duplicity finished 1st in 1948, but was disqualified for crossing.)	Edgar Britt	Marcus Marsh	Sir John Musker	1:47.20
1949	Avila	Michael Beary	Cecil Boyd-Rochfort	George VI	1:43.80
1950	Tambara	Charlie Smirke	Marcus Marsh	Aga Khan III	1:48.20
1951	Belle of All	Gordon Richards	Norman Bertie	Henry Thanet Tufton	1:44.80
1952	Zabara	Ken Gethin	Vic Smyth	Sir Malcolm McAlpine	1:44.60
1953	Happy Laughter	Bill Rickaby	Jack Jarvis	Davis Wills	1:48.00
1954	Festoon	Joe Mercer	Noel Cannon	John Arthur Dewar	1:49.20
1955	Meld	Harry Carr	Cecil Boyd-Rochfort	Lady Zia Wernher	1:44.91
1956	Midget	Rae Johnstone	Alec Head	Pierre Wertheimer	1:44.38
1957	Toro	J Massard	Alec Head	Aly Khan	1:42.37
1958	St Lucia	Geoff Lewis	Peter Hastings-Bass	Lord Sefton	1:43.72
1959	Rosalba	Joe Mercer	Robert Colling	Jakie Astor	1:43.52
1960	Barbaresque	George Moore	W Clout	W Guest	1:44.98
1961	Aiming High	Lester Piggott	Noel Murless	Elizabeth II	1:45.94
1962	Display	Garnie Bougoure	Paddy Prendergast	Mrs B Granard	1:44.58
1963	Fiji	Greville Starkey	John Oxley	Lady Halifax	1:49.38
1964	Ocean	Greville Starkey	John Oxley	Dick Hollingsworth	1:45.00
1965	Greengage	Scobie Breasley	Gordon Richards	R F Watson	1:45.07
1966	Haymaking	Joe Mercer	Fulke Johnson Houghton	C Nicholson	1:45.28
1967	Fleet	George Moore	Noel Murless	R. C. Boucher	1:45.65
1968	Sovereign	Ron Hutchinson	Harry Wragg	R B "Budgie" Moller	1:43.20
1969	Lucyrowe	Duncan Keith	Peter Walwyn	Louis Freedman	1:44.49
1970	Humble Duty	Duncan Keith	Peter Walwyn	Jean, Lady Ashcombe	1:44.80
1971	Magic Flute	Geoff Lewis	Noel Murless	Lord Howard de Walden	1:49.79
1972	Calve	Edward Hide	Paddy Prendergast	Lord Granard	1:43.55
1973	Jacinth	John Gorton	Bruce Hobbs	Lady Butt	1:48.65
1974	Lisadell	Lester Piggott	Vincent O'Brien	J Mulcahy	1:41.58
1975	Roussalka	Lester Piggott	Henry Cecil	N Phillips	1:42.54
1976	Kesar Queen	Yves Saint-Martin	Scobie Breasley	Ravi Tikkoo	1:42.06
1977	Orchestration	Pat Eddery	A J Maxwell	V McCalmont	1:45.87
1978	Sutton Place	Wally Swinburn	Dermot Weld	Mrs T Donahue	1:43.59
1979	One In A Million	Joe Mercer	Henry Cecil	Helena Springfield Ltd	1:42.18
1980	Cairn Rouge	Tony Murray	Michael Cunningham	D. Brady	1:45.37
1981	Tolmi	Edward Hide	Bruce Hobbs	George Cambanis	1:41.31
1982	Chalon	Lester Piggott	Henry Cecil	Michael Riordan	1:42.54
1983	Flame of Tara	Declan Gillespie	Jim Bolger	Patricia O'Kelly	1:42.16
1984	Katies	Philip Robinson	Mick Ryan	Terry Ramsden	1:40.79
1985	Al Bahathri	Tony Murray	Harry Thomson Jones	Hamdan Al Maktoum	1:40.03
1986	Sonic Lady	Walter Swinburn	Michael Stoute	Sheikh Mohammed	1:41.70
1987	Milligram	Walter Swinburn	Michael Stoute	Helena Springfield Ltd	1:44.68
1988	Magic of Life	Pat Eddery	Jeremy Tree	Stavros Niarchos	1:40.70
1989	Golden Opinion	Cash Asmussen	André Fabre	Sheikh Mohammed	1:39.60
1990	Chimes of Freedom	Steve Cauthen	Henry Cecil	Stavros Niarchos	1:41.29
1991	Kooyonga	Warren O'Connor	Michael Kauntze	Mitsuo Haga	1:42.54
1992	Marling	Walter Swinburn	Geoff Wragg	Sir Edmund Loder	1:39.01
1993	Gold Splash	Gérald Mossé	Criquette Head	Jacques Wertheimer	1:47.68
1994	Kissing Cousin	Michael Kinane	Henry Cecil	Sheikh Mohammed	1:39.96
1995	Ridgewood Pearl	Johnny Murtagh	John Oxx	Anne Coughlan	1:38.58
1996	Shake The Yoke	Olivier Peslier	Élie Lellouche	Serge Brunswick	1:40.45
1997	Rebecca Sharp	Michael Hills	Geoff Wragg	Anthony Oppenheimer	1:42.04
1998	Exclusive	Walter Swinburn	Sir Michael Stoute	Cheveley Park Stud	1:43.98
1999	Balisada	Michael Roberts	Geoff Wragg	Anthony Oppenheimer	1:41.43
2000	Crimplene	Philip Robinson	Clive Brittain	Marwan Al Maktoum	1:41.55
2001	Banks Hill	Olivier Peslier	André Fabre	Khalid Abdullah	1:39.61
2002	Sophisticat	Michael Kinane	Aidan O'Brien	Tabor / Magnier	1:41.59
2003	Russian Rhythm	Kieren Fallon	Sir Michael Stoute	Cheveley Park Stud	1:38.51
2004	Attraction	Kevin Darley	Mark Johnston	10th Duke of Roxburghe	1:38.54
2005 (Note: The 2005 running took place at York)	Maids Causeway	Michael Hills	Barry Hills	Martin S. Schwartz	1:36.59
2006	Nannina	Jimmy Fortune	John Gosden	Cheveley Park Stud	1:39.14
2007	Indian Ink	Richard Hughes	Richard Hannon Sr.	Raymond Tooth	1:42.26
2008	Lush Lashes	Kevin Manning	Jim Bolger	Jackie Bolger	1:39.23
2009	Ghanaati	Richard Hills	Barry Hills	Hamdan Al Maktoum	1:38.32
2010	Lillie Langtry	Johnny Murtagh	Aidan O'Brien	Tabor / Smith / Magnier	1:39.69
2011	Immortal Verse	Gérald Mossé	Robert Collet	Richard C. Strauss	1:42.75
2012	Fallen For You	William Buick	John Gosden	Normandie Stud	1:42.95
2013	Sky Lantern	Richard Hughes	Richard Hannon Sr.	B Keswick	1:39.75
2014	Rizeena	Ryan Moore	Clive Brittain	Rashid Dalmook Al Maktoum	1:40.73
2015	Ervedya	Christophe Soumillon	Jean-Claude Rouget	Aga Khan IV	1:38.46
2016	Qemah	Grégory Benoist	Jean-Claude Rouget	Al Shaqab Racing	1:40.56
2017	Winter	Ryan Moore	Aidan O'Brien	Tabor / Smith / Magnier	1:39.39
2018	Alpha Centauri	Colm O'Donoghue	Jessica Harrington	Niarchos Family	1:35.89
2019	Watch Me	Pierre-Charles Boudot	Francis-Henri Graffard	Alexander Tamagni	1:39.61
2020	Alpine Star	Frankie Dettori	Jessica Harrington	Niarchos Family	1:42.21
2021	Alcohol Free	Oisin Murphy	Andrew Balding	Jeff Smith	1:43.13
2022	Inspiral	Frankie Dettori	John & Thady Gosden	Cheveley Park Stud	1:39.20
2023	Tahiyra	Chris Hayes	Dermot Weld	Aga Khan IV	1:41.69
2024	Porta Fortuna	Tom Marquand	Donnacha O'Brien	Medallion/S Weston/B Fowler/Reeves T'Bs	1:40.48
2025	Cercene	Gary Carroll	Joseph Murphy	Shane R Stafford	1:38.35
2026	Precise	Ryan Moore	Aidan O'Brien	Smith / Magnier / Tabor / Westerberg	1:39.58

== Earlier winners ==
- 1840: Spangle
- 1841: Ghuznee
- 1842: Celia
- 1843: La Stimata
- 1844: The Princess
- 1845: Stitch
- 1846: Guaracha
- 1847: Cosachia
- 1848: Distaffina
- 1849: Lady Evelyn
- 1850: filly by Slane
- 1851: Barcelona
- 1852: Iona
- 1853: Catherine Hayes
- 1854: Mishap
- 1855: Alcyone
- 1856: Victoria
- 1857: Beechnut
- 1858: Sunbeam
- 1859: Cantine
- 1860: Allington
- 1861: Queen of the Vale
- 1862: Polynesia
- 1863: Lady Augusta
- 1864: Breeze
- 1865: Siberia
- 1866: Mother of Pearl
- 1867: Achievement
- 1868: Athena
- 1869: Martinique
- 1870: Sunshine
- 1871: Corisande
- 1872: Highland Lassie
- 1873: Marie Stuart
- 1874: Apology
- 1875: Maud Victoria
- 1876: Footstep
- 1877: Belphoebe
- 1878: Redwing
- 1879: Lelia
- 1880: L'Eclair
- 1881: Mazurka
- 1882: Rozelle
- 1883: Lovely
- 1884: Sandiway
- 1885: St Helena
- 1886: Argo Navis
- 1887: Heloise
- 1888: Seabreeze
- 1889: Seclusion
- 1890: Heresy
- 1891: Cereza
- 1892: Lady Hermit
- 1893: Silene
- 1894: Throstle
- 1895: Butterfly
- 1896: Helm
- 1897: Goletta
- 1898: Lowood
- 1899: Fascination

== See also ==
- Horse racing in Great Britain
- List of British flat horse races
