= Embla (horse) =

British-bred Thoroughbred racehorse

- Sire: Dominion
- Grandsire: Derring-Do
- Dam: Kaftan
- Damsire: Kashmir
- Sex: Mare
- Foaled: 27 April 1983
- Country: United Kingdom
- Colour: Bay
- Owner: Charles St George
- Trainer: Luca Cumani
- Record: 9: 4-2-0

Major wins
- Cheveley Park Stakes (1985)

Awards
- Timeform rating 121 (1985), 110 (1986); Top-rated British two-year-old filly (1985)

Embla (27 April 1983 – after 2003) was a British Thoroughbred racehorse and broodmare. In a racing career which lasted from June 1985 until October 1986 she won four of her nine races. As a two-year-old she finished second on her debut and won two minor races before recording an upset victory over a strong field for the Cheveley Park Stakes. In the following year she finished fifth in the 1000 Guineas and second in the Coronation Stakes before ending her career with a win in the Petition Stakes. Her broodmare career was largely undistinguished but she produced one excellent racehorse in Zenno El Cid, a major winner in Japan.

== Background ==
Embla was a "strong, rangy" dark bay mare with no white markings bred in the United Kingdom by Cleaboy Farms. She was sired by Dominion who finished third in the 1975 2000 Guineas and won the Prix Perth in 1976. before being exported to North America and winning the Bernard Baruch Handicap in 1978. He sired several good horses over a wide range of distances including First Island, the sprinter Primo Dominie (Coventry Stakes), and the stayer Trainglot (Cesarewitch Handicap). Embla's dam Kaftan won one minor race from four attempts but was a half-sister to the Nunthorpe Stakes winner Blue Cashmere and a granddaughter of the Yorkshire Oaks runner-up No Saint, whose other descendants included Persian Heights.

As a yearling Embla was offered for sale and bought for 46,000 guineas by representatives of Charles St George. The filly was sent into training with Luca Cumani at Newmarket, Suffolk.

== Racing career ==
=== 1985: two-year-old season ===
Embla began her racing career by finishing second in a minor race over six furlongs at Newmarket Racecourse in late June. She then started favourite for an eighteen-runner maiden race at Kempton Park Racecourse in July and won easily. On her next appearance she was less impressive as she started 1/5 favourite for a minor event at Ripon Racecourse in August but won by only three-quarters of a length from Raisinhell. Timeform described her as "scrambling home" in the race. Cumani, nevertheless, held the filly in high regard and later explained that she had been going through an "awkward growing phase" at the time.

On her final appearance of the year, Embla was moved up sharply in class to contest the Cheveley Park Stakes (the only Group One race in Britain at the time restricted to juvenile fillies) over six furlongs at Newmarket in October. The leading American jockey Angel Cordero was booked for the ride, but the filly was given little chance and started a 20/1 outsider in a thirteen-runner field. The Jeremy Tree-trained Kingcote started favourite after a four-length win in the Lowther Stakes, whilst the other contenders included Park Express, Storm Star (winner of the Cherry Hinton Stakes), Asteroid Field (Waterford Candelabra Stakes), Bambolona (Sirenia Stakes), Wanton (third in the Flying Childers Stakes), Nashia (runner-up in the Prix d'Arenberg) and Rose of the Sea (fourth in the Prix Morny). In the early stages Rose of the Sea led from Storm Star, with Embla towards the rear and apparently struggling to match the pace. Kingscote went to the front approaching the final furlong but Embla was making relentless progress and soon moved into contention. She overtook Kingscote a hundred yards from the finish and won by a length. Rose of the Sea held on for third ahead of Asteroid Field.

=== 1986: three-year-old season ===
On her three-year-old debut Embla contested the Nell Gwyn Stakes (a trial race for the 1000 Guineas) over seven furlongs at Newmarket on 15 April and finished fourth of the nine runners behind Sonic Lady. Sixteen days later she started 6/1 second favourite behind Sonic Lady in the 1000 Guineas. Ridden by Tony Ives she finished fifth behind Midway Lady, Maysoon, Sonic Lady and Ala Mahlik. She proved no match for Sonic Lady in her next two races, finishing second in the Coronation Stakes at Royal Ascot in June and fifth in the Child Stakes at Newmarket on 9 July. After a break of three months the filly returned and was dropped in class for the Petition Stakes over one mile at Newmarket in October. She recorded her only success of the year as she narrowly defeated the colt Santella Mac.

== Assessment ==
In the official International Classification for 1985, Embla was rated the third-best two-year-old filly in Europe after the French-trained Baiser Vole and Regal State. The independent Timeform organisation rated her on 121, three pounds behind their top juvenile filly Femme Elite. She was rated 110 by Timeform in 1986.

== Breeding record ==
Embla was retired from racing to become a broodmare and produced eleven foals between 1988 and 2003. Three of her offspring won races, with the most successful, by far, being the Japanese horse Zenno El Cid.

- Nordic Myth, a bay filly, foaled in 1988, sired by Shareef Dancer. Unraced.
- Emblazonry, brown colt, 1989, by Shareef Dancer. Unplaced on only start.
- Ghost Tree, brown filly, 1990, by Caerleon. Won one race.
- Abzu, bay colt, 1992, by In the Wings. Unraced.
- Enriched, bay filly, 1993, by Generous. Won one race.
- Catria, brown filly, 1994, by Caerleon. Failed to win in six races.
- Compton Angel, bay mare, 1996, by Fairy King. Won one race.
- Zenno El Cid, brown colt, 1997, by Caerleon. Won six races including Mile Championship.
- Dream, bay filly, 1998, by Sadler's Wells. Failed to win in five races.
- Danseur Celebre, bay filly, 1999, by Peintre Celebre. Unraced.
- Ferrari One, brown colt, 2003, by Sunday Silence. Failed to win in twelve races.

== Pedigree ==
Pedigree of Embla (GB), bay mare, 1983
Sire Dominion (GB) 1972	Derring-Do (GB); 1961	Darius	Dante
Sire Dominion (GB) 1972	Derring-Do (GB); 1961	Darius	Yasna
Sire Dominion (GB) 1972	Derring-Do (GB); 1961	Sipsey Bridge	Abernant
Sire Dominion (GB) 1972	Derring-Do (GB); 1961	Sipsey Bridge	Claudette
Sire Dominion (GB) 1972	Picture Palace (GB); 1961	Princely Gift	Nasrullah
Sire Dominion (GB) 1972	Picture Palace (GB); 1961	Princely Gift	Blue Gem
Sire Dominion (GB) 1972	Picture Palace (GB); 1961	Plais Glide	King Legend
Sire Dominion (GB) 1972	Picture Palace (GB); 1961	Plais Glide	Side Slip
Dam Kaftan (GB) 1975	Kashmir (IRE); 1963	Tudor Melody	Tudor Minstrel
Dam Kaftan (GB) 1975	Kashmir (IRE); 1963	Tudor Melody	Matelda
Dam Kaftan (GB) 1975	Kashmir (IRE); 1963	Queen of Speed	Blue Train
Dam Kaftan (GB) 1975	Kashmir (IRE); 1963	Queen of Speed	Bishopscourt
Dam Kaftan (GB) 1975	Blessed Again (GB); 1965	Ballymoss	Mossborough
Dam Kaftan (GB) 1975	Blessed Again (GB); 1965	Ballymoss	Indian Call
Dam Kaftan (GB) 1975	Blessed Again (GB); 1965	No Saint	Narrator
Dam Kaftan (GB) 1975	Blessed Again (GB); 1965	No Saint	Vellada (Family:16-g)
