= Light Brocade =

British Thoroughbred racehorse

- Sire: Galloper Light
- Grandsire: Sunstar
- Dam: Trilogy
- Damsire: Son-in-Law
- Sex: Mare
- Foaled: 1931
- Country: United Kingdom
- Colour: Brown
- Breeder: John Lambton, 5th Earl of Durham
- Owner: John Lambton, 5th Earl of Durham
- Trainer: Frank Butters
- Record: 8: 4-1-0

Major wins
- Molecomb Stakes (1933); Cheveley Park Stakes (1933); Epsom Oaks (1934)

Light Brocade (1931–1947) was a British Thoroughbred racehorse and broodmare. She was one of the best two-year-old fillies in England in 1933 when she won three of her four races including the Molecomb Stakes and Cheveley Park Stakes. In the following year she finished second in the 1000 Guineas before recording her biggest win in the Epsom Oaks. She was beaten in her only subsequent start and retired with a record of four wins from eight starts. She made little immediate success as a broodmare but her female-line descendants went on to have great success in Japan.

== Background ==
Light Brocade was a "beautiful" brown mare bred in England by her owner John Lambton, 5th Earl of Durham. She was sent into training with Frank Butters at the Fitzroy House stable at Newmarket, Suffolk.

She was one of the best horses sired by Galloper Light, an English-bred stallion who won the Grand Prix de Paris in 1919. Light Brocade's dam Trilogy was a sister to the Ascot Gold Cup winners Trimdon and Foxhunter and a high-class racehorse in her own right, finishing second in the 1000 Guineas in 1926.

== Racing career ==
=== 1933: two-year-old season ===
As a two-year-old in 1933 Light Brocade was beaten on her debut at Newmarket Racecourse in July before contesting the Molecomb Stakes over five furlongs at Goodwood Racecourse later that month. Ridden by Bernard "Brownie" Carslake she started at odds of 8/1 and won from Instantaneous and Flinders. She followed up by winning the Convivial Plate at York Racecourse in August after which she was described as being "amazingly quick". At Newmarket in October, with Carslake again in the saddle, she won the Cheveley Park Stakes at odds of 11/8.

=== 1934: three-year-old season ===
Light Brocade made her first appearance of 1934 in the Column Produce Stakes at Newmarket in April and came home last of the seven runners behind the Jack Jarvis-trained Campanula. She produced a much better performance in the 1000 Guinea at the same track on 4 May when she finished second to Campanula, beaten a length by the odds-on favourite. On her next appearance she was stepped up in distance for the Oaks Stakes at Epsom Racecourse on 8 of June and was made the 7/4 favourite. Her seven opponents included Campanula, Instantaneous and Zelina (Greenham Plate). Looking very impressive before the race, Light Brocade tracked the front-running Instantaneous before taking the lead in the straight and won by one and a half lengths from Zelina with Instantaneous holding on for third ahead of Campanula.

On her only other appearance, Light Brocade was brought back in distance and assigned top weight for the Coronation Stakes over one mile at Royal Ascot in June. She produced a "very moderate display" and was never in contention before finishing unplaced behind Foxcroft.

== Assessment and honours ==
In the official Free Handicap for 1933, Light Brocade was rated the second best two-year-old filly in England, one pound behind Campanula.

In their book, A Century of Champions, based on the Timeform rating system, John Randall and Tony Morris rated Light Brocade an "average" winner of the Oaks.

== Breeding record ==
At the end of her racing career, Light Brocade was retired to become a broodmare. She produced at least two foals and one winner:

- Dark Brocade, a bay filly, foaled in 1940, sired by Le Ksar. Winner. Her daughter Heatherlands was exported to Japan where she became a very influential broodmare. Her descendants included Agnes Lady (Yushun Himba), Agnes Flora, Agnes Flight and Agnes Tachyon (Satsuki Sho).
- Flame Brocade, brown filly, 1945, by Lighthouse. Failed to win a race.

Light Brocade was euthanised in 1947.

== Pedigree ==
Pedigree of Light Brocade (GB), brown mare, 1931
Sire Galloper Light (GB) 1916	Sunstar (GB); 1908	Sundridge	Amphion
Sire Galloper Light (GB) 1916	Sunstar (GB); 1908	Sundridge	Sierra
Sire Galloper Light (GB) 1916	Sunstar (GB); 1908	Doris	Loved One
Sire Galloper Light (GB) 1916	Sunstar (GB); 1908	Doris	Lauretta
Sire Galloper Light (GB) 1916	Santa Fina (GB); 1907	St Frusquin	St Simon
Sire Galloper Light (GB) 1916	Santa Fina (GB); 1907	St Frusquin	Isabel
Sire Galloper Light (GB) 1916	Santa Fina (GB); 1907	Grig	Crafton
Sire Galloper Light (GB) 1916	Santa Fina (GB); 1907	Grig	Merrie Lassie
Dam Trilogy (GB) 1923	Son-in-Law (GB); 1911	Dark Ronald (IRE)	Bay Ronald (GB)
Dam Trilogy (GB) 1923	Son-in-Law (GB); 1911	Dark Ronald (IRE)	Darkie (GB)
Dam Trilogy (GB) 1923	Son-in-Law (GB); 1911	Mother In Law	Matchmaker
Dam Trilogy (GB) 1923	Son-in-Law (GB); 1911	Mother In Law	Be Cannie
Dam Trilogy (GB) 1923	Trimestral (GB); 1914	William the Third	St Simon
Dam Trilogy (GB) 1923	Trimestral (GB); 1914	William the Third	Gravity
Dam Trilogy (GB) 1923	Trimestral (GB); 1914	Mistrella	Cyllene
Dam Trilogy (GB) 1923	Trimestral (GB); 1914	Mistrella	Ark Royal (Family 1-l)

- Light Brocade was inbred 4 × 4 to St Simon, meaning that this stallion appears twice in the fourth generation of her pedigree.
