= Silver Urn =

Irish-bred Thoroughbred racehorse

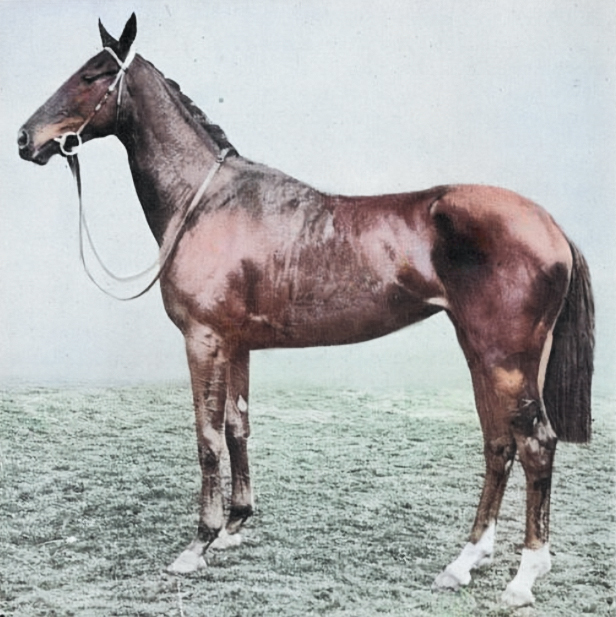
- Silver Urn in 1922.
- Sire: Juggernaut
- Grandsire: St Simon
- Dam: Queen Silver
- Damsire: Queen's Birthday
- Sex: Mare
- Foaled: 1919
- Country: United Kingdom
- Colour: Chestnut
- Breeder: B W Parr
- Owner: B W Parr
- Trainer: Atty Persse
- Record: 8: 3-0-0
- Earnings: £10,004

Major wins
- 1000 Guineas (1922)

Silver Urn (1919 – 1930) was an Irish-bred, British-trained Thoroughbred racehorse and broodmare. As a two-year-old she showed little ability but in the following spring she won two valuable handicap races and then recorded her biggest win in the 1000 Guineas. On her next appearance she sustained career-ending injuries in the Epsom Oaks and never raced again. She had some success as a dam of winners.

== Background ==
Silver Urn was a chestnut mare of good size and "excellent lines" bred in Ireland and owned by B W Parr. She was trained throughout her racing career by Henry Seymour "Atty" Persse at Chattis Hill near Stockbridge in Hampshire.

She was sired by Juggernaut, a son of St Simon bred Edward VII. Her dam Queen Silver was a daughter of Sterling Balm, a very fast filly who won the Coventry Stakes and Gimcrack Stakes and was thus a half-sister to Princess Sterling, a broodmare whose descendants included St Louis and Noblesse. Queen Silver, who was bought by Parr for £25 was a successful broodmare in her own right, producing several good winners both on the flat and under National Hunt rules.

== Racing career ==
=== 1921: two-year-old season ===
Silver Urn's two-year-old career comprised three races within eleven days in the late autumn of 1921 starting with an unplaced effort in the Rangemore Maiden Stakes at Derby Racecourse on 16 November. She then finished unplaced in the Daventry Plate at Warwick Racecourse on the 22nd of the month and then ran unplaced in the County Open Plate at Lingfield Park four days later.

=== 1922: three-year-old season ===
Silver Urn was well supported in the betting for her 1922 debut at Newbury Racecourse but in a "gale of sleet" she finished well beaten behind Westmead. She recorded her first success shortly afterwards when Stewards Handicap over five furlongs at Kempton Park Racecourse, and then took the Esher Cup at Sandown Park at odds of 7/1. On 28 April over the Rowley Mile course at Newmarket Racecourse Silver Urn, ridden by the Australian jockey Bernard "Brownie" Carslake started at odds of 10/1 in a twenty-runner field for the 109th running of the 1000 Guineas. She was not among the early leaders but began to make steady progress in the last quarter mile, overtook the 7/4 favourite Golden Corn approaching the final furlong. She won the race by two lengths from Soubriquet with the fading Golden Corn a further three quarters of a length back in third place.

Silver Urn was made 5/1 third choice in the betting for the Epsom Oaks a month late but was injured in the race and came home unplaced behind Pogrom. A post-race examination revealed deep, jagged cuts to her legs, which had caused irreparable damage to the ligaments. It was believed that she had stepped on a broken bottle or other sharp object during the race. She received prompt treatment at the Epsom veterinary hospital, but never fully recovered and did not race again.

Following the death of her owner, Silver Urn was put up for auction at Doncaster and was sold for 4,000 guineas to Lord Dewar.

== Assessment and honours ==
In their book, A Century of Champions, based on the Timeform rating system, John Randall and Tony Morris rated Silver Urn an "average" winner of the 1000 Guineas.

She was described in contemporary reports as one of the best of an exceptional crop of three-year-old fillies.

== Breeding record ==
As a broodmare Silver Urn produced several minor winners but no top-class performers. Her foals included:

- Golden Chalice, a chestnut colt, foaled in 1924, sired by Abbots Trace
- Christening Cup, chestnut, filly, 1925, by Abbots Trace
- Silver Cloud, bay filly, 1927, by Manna. Dam of Silversol (Irish Oaks).
- Silverburn, bay colt, 1928, by Phalaris
- Loot, bay colt, 1929, by Phalaris
- Silver Boy, bay gelding, 1930, by Son-in-Law

Silver Urn died in 1930.

== Pedigree ==
Pedigree of Silver Urn (GB), chestnut mare, 1919
Sire Juggernaut (GB) 1908	St. Simon; 1881	Galopin	Vedette
Sire Juggernaut (GB) 1908	St. Simon; 1881	Galopin	Flying Duchess
Sire Juggernaut (GB) 1908	St. Simon; 1881	St. Angela	King Tom
Sire Juggernaut (GB) 1908	St. Simon; 1881	St. Angela	Adeline
Sire Juggernaut (GB) 1908	Amphora; 1893	Amphion	Rosebery
Sire Juggernaut (GB) 1908	Amphora; 1893	Amphion	Suicide
Sire Juggernaut (GB) 1908	Amphora; 1893	Sierra	Springfield
Sire Juggernaut (GB) 1908	Amphora; 1893	Sierra	Sanda
Dam Queen Silver (GB) 1906	Queen's Birthday; 1887	Hagioscope	Speculum
Dam Queen Silver (GB) 1906	Queen's Birthday; 1887	Hagioscope	Sophia
Dam Queen Silver (GB) 1906	Queen's Birthday; 1887	Matilda	Beauclerc
Dam Queen Silver (GB) 1906	Queen's Birthday; 1887	Matilda	Simony
Dam Queen Silver (GB) 1906	Sterling Balm; 1899	Friar's Balsam	Hermit
Dam Queen Silver (GB) 1906	Sterling Balm; 1899	Friar's Balsam	Flower of Dorset
Dam Queen Silver (GB) 1906	Sterling Balm; 1899	Yesterling	Sterling
Dam Queen Silver (GB) 1906	Sterling Balm; 1899	Yesterling	Yessel (Family: 14-f)
