= Embla (given name) =

Embla is a Scandinavian feminine given name. In Norse mythology, Embla was the first woman.

People with the name Embla include:

- Embla Hjulström (born 1994), Swedish actress
- Embla Kristínardóttir (born 1995), Icelandic basketball player
