= Embla (restaurant) =

Restaurant in Melbourne, Australia

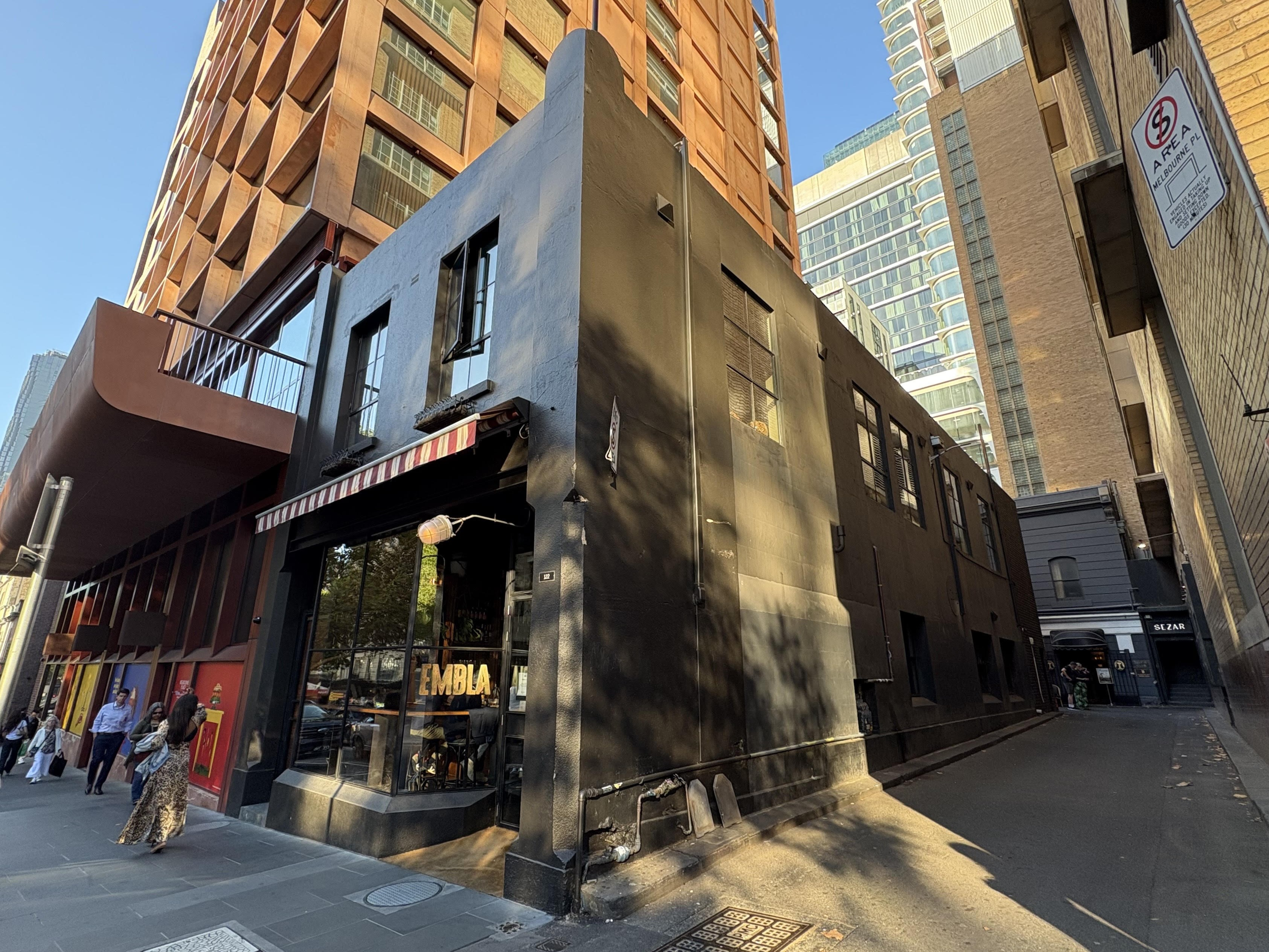
- Embla in March 2025
- Address: 122 Russell St; Melbourne; Australia
- Opened: 2016

Website
- embla.com.au

Embla is a restaurant in Melbourne, Australia.

== Description ==
The restaurant is a wine bar with a kitchen behind the counter visible to patrons.

Most food in the restaurant is cooked in a wood-fired coven. Gourmet Traveller has described the food served as 'simple' and 'smart, comforting'. The roast chicken received particular praise.

The second-hand interior furniture is sourced from New Zealand. The room is aesthetically full of dark colours, with black leather at the back of its space. Other visual features include its grey stone-tiled floor, moulded timber joinery, and vintage light shades.

== Reception ==
Embla was described as an example of a kind of restaurant that Melbourne tends to be associated with, that of the 'flexible, well-designed, mid-priced diner'. It has been compared to The Carlton Wine Room, Bar Lourinhã, Izakaya Den, and Kirk's Wine Bar.

Its wine list also received mild praise; with a deliberate focus on less-known producers. It focuses primarily on Australian producers.

== History ==
It was opened in 2016, and is operated by Australian chef Dave Verheul, and business partner Christian McCabe. Eric Nairoo is a part-owner.

In 2019, the restaurant opened a sister venue named Lesa, located above Embla.

In 2023, the venue was visited by the Obamas and Lewis Hamilton.

== See also ==
- All Things Equal
