= Frank Hardy (jockey) =

English jockey

Personal information
- Born: 26 December 1884 Northampton, England
- Died: 29 September 1913 (aged 28) Hornsey, Middlesex, England
- Occupation: Jockey

Horse racing career
- Sport: Horse racing

Major racing wins
- British Classic Races: St Leger Stakes (1902); Other major races

Racing awards
- British flat racing Champion Apprentice (1902 - tied)

Significant horses
- Sceptre
- Updated on 22 October 2023

Frank Hardy (1884 - 1913) was a Classic-winning jockey, who, in a career cut short by ill-health, won the 1902 St Leger on the celebrated Sceptre, the only horse to win four British Classic Races outright. He was the joint Champion Apprentice of 1902.

== Career ==
Frank William Hardy was born in Northampton on Boxing Day 1884, son of a plumber.

He became apprentice to Thomas Jennings Jr., who was based at Phantom House, Newmarket and his first winner was Papdale at Newmarket on 18 July 1901.

The peak of his career came in 1902. He had been beaten on the top filly, Sceptre, early in the season in the Lincoln Handicap and lost the ride to Herbert Randall, who proceeded to win the 1,000 Guineas, 2,000 Guineas and Oaks on her. However, Randall fell out with the stable and Hardy was re-engaged for the St Leger, a race he won easily. That year, he was joint champion apprentice with 74 winners.

On 31 March 1904, he fractured his thigh when Traitress hit a post and fell into the crowd at Northampton.

Ill-health came to effect him and after a spell riding in France, he returned to England in 1913 and died in Hornsey, Middlesex, on 29 September 1913 of consumption. He was buried at Newmarket on 4 October.

== Major wins ==
(United Kingdom) Great Britain

- St Leger Stakes - Sceptre (1902)

== See also ==
- List of jockeys
