= Michael Beary (jockey) =

Irish flat racing jockey (1894/96–1956)

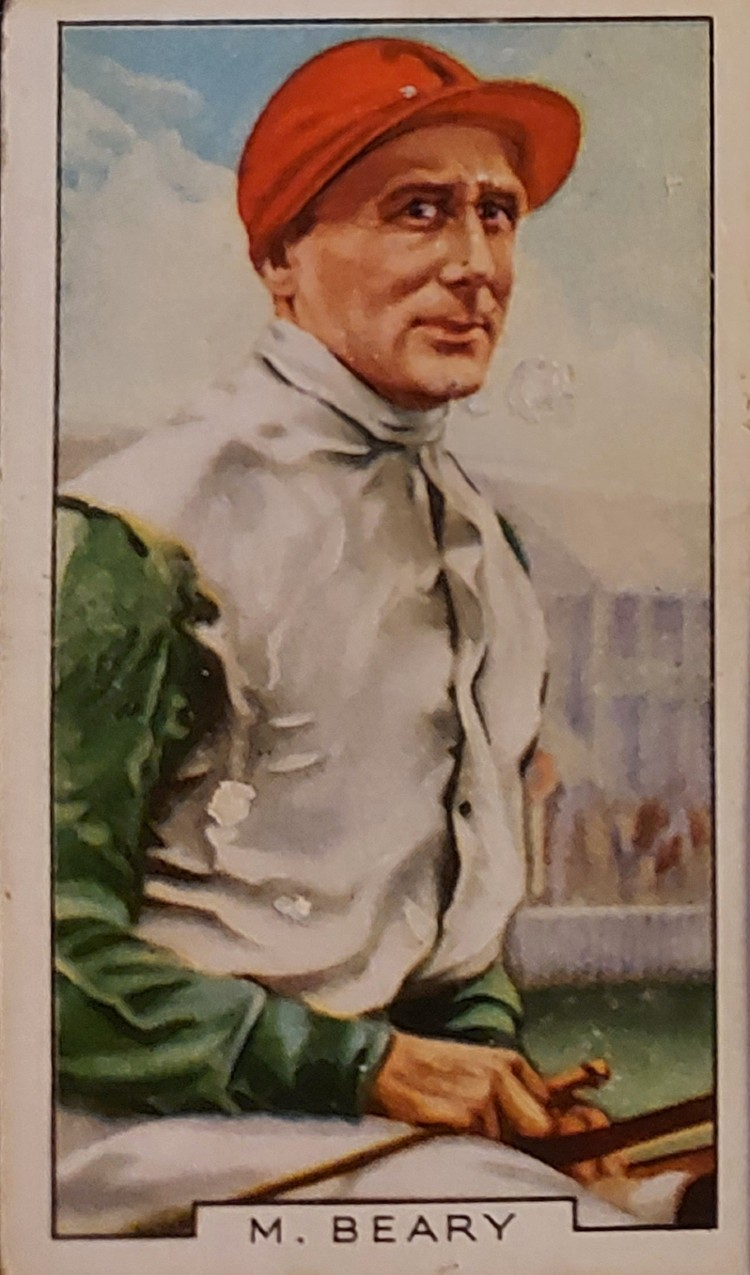
- Michael Beary, in the colours of Captain A.S.Wilson (Gallaher's cigarette card, 1936)

Personal information
- Born: 9 December 1894 or 1896 Clonmel, County Tipperary, Eire
- Died: 8 October 1956 London, England
- Occupation: Jockey

Horse racing career
- Sport: Horse racing

Major racing wins
- Classic races: (as jockey); Oaks Stakes (1932); Derby Stakes (1937); St Leger Stakes (1929, 1949) (as trainer); 2000 Guineas (1951); Other major races July Cup (1924); Sussex Stakes (1924, 1929, 1932, 1941); Nunthorpe Stakes (1945); Middle Park Stakes (1922, 1925, 1928, 1932); Dewhurst Stakes (1931, 1933); Champion Stakes (1933(dh))

Honours
- Irish Champion Jockey (1920)

Significant horses
- Burslem, Costaki Pasha, Dastur, Drake, Eastern Echo, Felicitation, Firdaussi, Golden Cloud, Ki Ming, Le Phare, Lex, Mid-day Sun, Mrs Rustom, Ridge Wood, Trigo, Udaipur

Michael Beary was an Irish flat racing jockey, who won four British Classics and eight Irish Classics in a career that spanned from the 1910s to the 1950s. He was Irish Champion Jockey in 1920. The Racing Post ranked him the 13th greatest jockey of the 20th Century.

== Early life ==
Beary was born on 9 December 1894 (although some sources list 1896) in Clonmel, County Tipperary, into a racing and hunting family. He was the second son of John Beary, clerk of the Clonmel union, and Hannah (née Skeahan).

== Riding career ==
Beary began his apprenticeship with Colonel MacCabe in Ireland. In 1912, he moved to England to become apprentice to Atty Persse in Stockbridge, Hampshire, where he came under the tuition of the stable jockey Steve Donoghue. His first win was on Hainesby at Bath in 1913, although he had to stowaway in the back of Donoghue's car to get there as the head lad had refused permission for him to leave the yard. Shortly afterwards, he returned to Ireland to complete his apprenticeship with Curragh trainer J. J. Parkinson. There, his first winner came in 1914, and his first major win was on Banshee in the Phoenix Plate of 1916. Soon after, he began a series of Irish Classic victories, starting with three consecutive Irish Oaks - Snow Maiden in 1919, Place Royale in 1920 and The Kiwi in 1921. In the process, he became Irish Champion Jockey in 1920.

On his return to England, he quickly revealed himself as "a brilliant horseman". His first major win was in the 1923 Cambridgeshire on Verdict. In 1925, he had a surprise success in the Gimcrack Stakes at York on Les.

In 1926 and 1927 he was lead jockey for Sir Abe Bailey, before becoming attached to the Richard Dawson stable as retained jockey for the Aga Khan. The stable won the 1929 Derby with Trigo and although Beary had to ride the Aga Khan's Le Voleur in that race, he did ride Trigo to victory in both the English and Irish St Leger. He missed another Derby win in 1930, riding Rustom Pasha, instead of the stable's winner Blenheim.

Beary continued to be retained once the Aga Khan moved his horses to be trained by Frank Butters in Newmarket and for a couple of years was very successful. In 1932, he won the Oaks on Udaipur and was runner up in the 2000 Guineas, Derby and St Leger on Dastur, a colt which proved remarkably successful for him. Dastur won the 1932 Irish Derby as well as the 1933 Sussex Stakes and Champion Stakes. He finished second again in the St Leger in 1933, on Felicitation. After clashing with Butters, though, he split with the trainer and the Aga Khan. "Mr Butters resented my riding so many gallops and he resented my becoming so thoroughly acquainted with the merits of the Aga Khan's horses," he later said. "I both wrote and saw the Aga Khan and told him what a slur this had been on my reputation and that the fact that I had not ridden for him caused owners to be suspicious of me and to think that I had done something dishonest. The Aga Khan replied that he had written to Butters to give me rides."

On 16 June 1934 Butters rode Sindhi for the Aga Khan in a race at Gatwick. Although the odds-on favourite, Sindhi finished fourth, which led Beary to claim that Butters had deliberately put him on a rogue horse. Beary blamed the incident for the loss of potential rides at Royal Ascot and a negative effect on his bloodstock activities. "On the severance of my connection with the Aga Khan it was quite impossible for me to get any rides in first-class races and almost impossible to get rides at all. I have been compelled to ride gallops and take such part as I could in smaller races. Owing to the stigma which had attached to my name in consequence of my treatment by Mr Butters, I found it extremely difficult to obtain purchasers or good prices for my stock and this caused a serious loss." This was only partially true. He actually rode more races in 1934 than in 1933, although he only had 32 winners compared to 41.

The split cost him the opportunity to ride the 1935 Triple Crown winner Bahram. A few years later, however, he won the Derby for Butters' brother Frederick on Mid-day Sun.

In the 1940s he was retained by Sir Malcolm McAlpine and he was in his fifties when he had his most prolific season - 81 winners in 1949, including a second St Leger on Ridge Wood for Noel Murless.

== Later life ==
After retiring from race riding, he became a trainer in Wantage. In his first season, 1951, he won the 2000 Guineas with Ki Ming, a horse that had been trained by his brother John, until his licence was withdrawn for doping. Despite this success, he was unable to secure the patronage of many owners and struggled financially. As a result, he returned to race-riding in 1953, even riding in the Derby for Atty Persse, as well as some outings over hurdles. He returned to training, this time at Stockbridge, shortly before his death.

He was a successful breeder and his horse Dornot sired a number of winners.

He died in a London hospital on 8 October 1956.

== Reputation ==
Beary has been called a "superb horseman with style and dash" and "one of the great stylists of the century" but also a "hard rider". He was carefree, voluble but also volatile, which affected his prospects, as did his troubles with financial matters, particularly as a trainer. Three times he had his licence withdrawn, including for foul riding and alleged betting (although he was later exonerated), and three times he was made bankrupt - including in 1924 and 1936 after his severance from the Aga Khan.

== Major wins ==
(United Kingdom) Great Britain

- Oaks Stakes – Udaipur (1932)
- Derby Stakes – Mid-day Sun (1937)
- St Leger Stakes – Trigo (1929), Ridge Wood (1949)
- Champion Stakes – Dastur (1933(dh))
- Dewhurst Stakes – Firdaussi (1931), Mrs Rustom (1933)
- July Cup – Drake (1924)
- Middle Park Stakes – Drake (1922), Lex (1925), Costaki Pasha (1928), Felicitation (1932)
- Nunthorpe Stakes – Golden Cloud (1945)
- Sussex Stakes – Burslem (1924), Le Phare (1929), Dastur (1932), Eastern Echo (1941)

(Republic of Ireland) Ireland

- Irish Oaks - Snow Maiden (1919), Place Royale (1920), The Kiwi (1921), Theresina (1930)
- Irish Derby - Knight of the Grail (1927), Dastur (1932)
- Irish St Leger - Kircubbin (1921), Trigo (1929)

== See also ==
- List of jockeys

== Bibliography ==
- Mortimer, Roger; Onslow, Richard; Willett, Peter (1978). Biographical Encyclopaedia of British Racing. London: Macdonald and Jane's. ISBN 0-354-08536-0.
- Murphy, William. Dictionary of Irish Biography. Cambridge University Press.
- Tanner, Michael; Cranham, Gerry (1992). Great Jockeys of the Flat. Enfield, Middlesex: Guinness Publishing. ISBN 0-85112-989-7.
