= Captain Cuttle =

British Thoroughbred racehorse

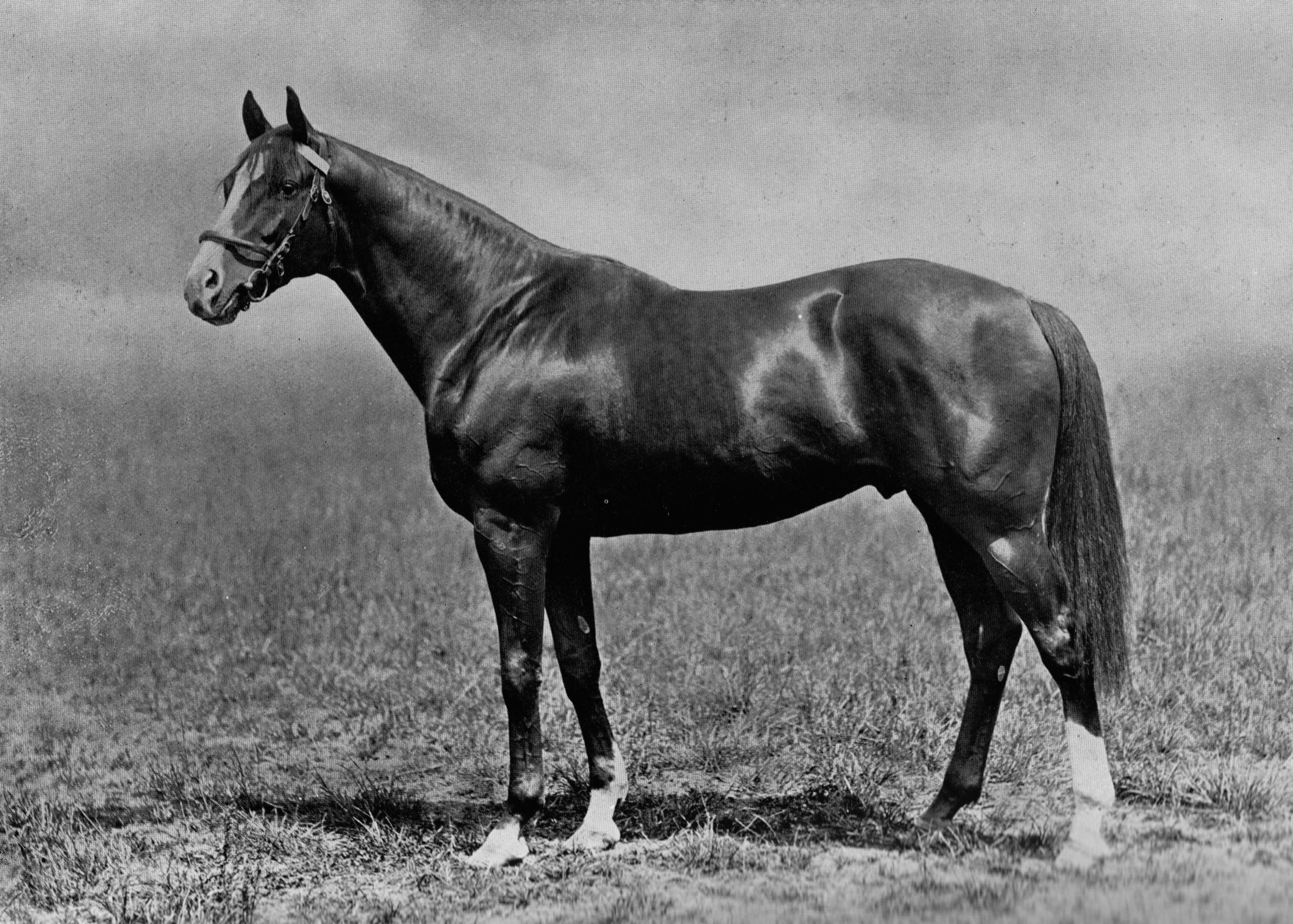
- Captain Cuttle in a photograph by Frank Griggs.
- Sire: Hurry On
- Grandsire: Marcovil
- Dam: Bellavista
- Damsire: Cyllene
- Sex: Stallion
- Foaled: 1919
- Country: United Kingdom of Great Britain and Ireland
- Colour: Chestnut
- Breeder: Lord Woolavington
- Owner: Lord Woolavington
- Trainer: Fred Darling
- Record: 6: 4-1-1
- Earnings: £

Major wins
- Epsom Derby (1922); St James's Palace Stakes (1922)

Captain Cuttle was a British Thoroughbred racehorse and sire. He ran only six times in a career which was restricted by chronic injury problems. He was the outstanding British colt of his generation, winning The Derby and the St James's Palace Stakes in 1922. He retired after winning his only race as a four-year-old in 1923.

== Background ==
Captain Cuttle, an exceptionally good-looking chestnut horse with a broad white blaze and three white socks, was bred by his owner Lord Woolavington. He was from the first crop of foals sired by the unbeaten champion, Hurry On, making him a representative of the Godolphin Arabian sire line. Apart from Captain Cuttle, Hurry On sired the winners of seven Classics including the Derby winners Coronach and Call Boy. His most influential son was the Ascot Gold Cup winner Precipitation, who sired four classic winners.

Captain Cuttle was named after the character in Dickens' novel Dombey and Son. Like his sire, Captain Cuttle was trained throughout his career by Fred Darling at Beckhampton in Wiltshire, and was ridden in his most important races by the leading British jockey of the era Steve Donoghue. The colt was particularly devoted to his trainer, following him "like a pet dog."

== Racing career ==
=== 1921: two-year-old season ===
Captain Cuttle was a slow-maturing colt and was not highly tried at two. He made only one appearance on the racecourse, finishing second in a minor race at Doncaster. Captain Cuttle's heavy physique and immaturity put a strain on his forelegs, leading Darling to treat him very carefully, riding the colt himself in most of his exercise work.

=== 1922: three-year-old season ===
Captain Cuttle began his three-year-old season in the Wood Ditton Stakes at Newmarket Racecourse, which he won by six lengths. He became ill after the race and had not fully recovered by the time he ran in the 2000 Guineas. He finished third in the Newmarket Classic, beaten a total of seven lengths, behind St Louis and Pondoland.

There were doubts concerning the colt's stamina, and he started at odds of 10/1 in a field of thirty for the Epsom Derby four weeks later. Captain Cuttle missed the parade for the Derby after a delay caused by a shoeing accident. Allegations were later made in the Daily Express that Captain Cuttle had been illegally injected with cocaine, to combat lameness caused by the incident. Lord Woolavington responded by instituting legal proceedings against the newspaper for libel. Ridden by Donoghue, Captain Cuttle was prominent from the start before moving into the lead entering the straight. He was soon clear and won easily by four lengths from Tamar in a race record time of 2:34.6.

The colt was reported to be lame after the race and there were rumours that his career was over but he appeared to have recovered in time for Royal Ascot where he won the St James's Palace Stakes over a mile. He then suffered a tendon injury which forced him out for the rest of the season.

=== 1923: four-year-old season ===
On his 1923 debut, Captain Cuttle won the Prince of Wales's Stakes at Kempton. He was being prepared for the Ascot Gold Cup when his tendon problems recurred and he was retired to stud.

== Assessment ==
In their book A Century of Champions, John Randall and Tony Morris rated Captain Cuttle the seventy-third best British horse of the 20th century and the second best Derby winner of the 1920s .

== Stud career ==
Captain Cuttle retired to his owner's stud at Lavington, West Sussex. He had some success, siring the 1000 Guineas winner Scuttle but did not live up to expectations and was sold for a reported £40,000 to stand in Italy in 1927. He died at the Mirafiori stud, near Turin in March 1932 after breaking his back in a freak accident.

== Sire line tree ==
- Captain Cuttle
  - Mint Master
  - Walter Gay
  - The Recorder
  - Pilade
    - Gong

== Pedigree ==
Pedigree of Captain Cuttle (GB), chestnut stallion, 1919
Sire Hurry On (IRE) 1913	Marcovil; 1903	Marco	Barcaldine
Sire Hurry On (IRE) 1913	Marcovil; 1903	Marco	Novitiate
Sire Hurry On (IRE) 1913	Marcovil; 1903	Lady Villikins	Hagioscope
Sire Hurry On (IRE) 1913	Marcovil; 1903	Lady Villikins	Dinah
Sire Hurry On (IRE) 1913	Toute Suite; 1904	Sainfoin	Springfield
Sire Hurry On (IRE) 1913	Toute Suite; 1904	Sainfoin	Sanda
Sire Hurry On (IRE) 1913	Toute Suite; 1904	Star	Thurio
Sire Hurry On (IRE) 1913	Toute Suite; 1904	Star	Meteor
Dam Bellavista (GB) 1904	Cyllene; 1895	Bona Vista	Bend Or
Dam Bellavista (GB) 1904	Cyllene; 1895	Bona Vista	Vista
Dam Bellavista (GB) 1904	Cyllene; 1895	Arcadia	Isonomy
Dam Bellavista (GB) 1904	Cyllene; 1895	Arcadia	Distant Shore
Dam Bellavista (GB) 1904	Emotion; 1897	Nunthorpe	Speculum
Dam Bellavista (GB) 1904	Emotion; 1897	Nunthorpe	Matilda
Dam Bellavista (GB) 1904	Emotion; 1897	Emita	Galopin
Dam Bellavista (GB) 1904	Emotion; 1897	Emita	Burgundy (Family: 22-c)

== Name ==
The name "Captain Cuttle" was taken from a character in Dombey and Son by Charles Dickens, Captain Edward Cuttle. It was subsequently applied to an LNER Class A3 locomotive, No. 2745 (BR number 60091), many of which class were named for racehorses.
