= Frank Butters =

Racehorse trainer (1878–1957)

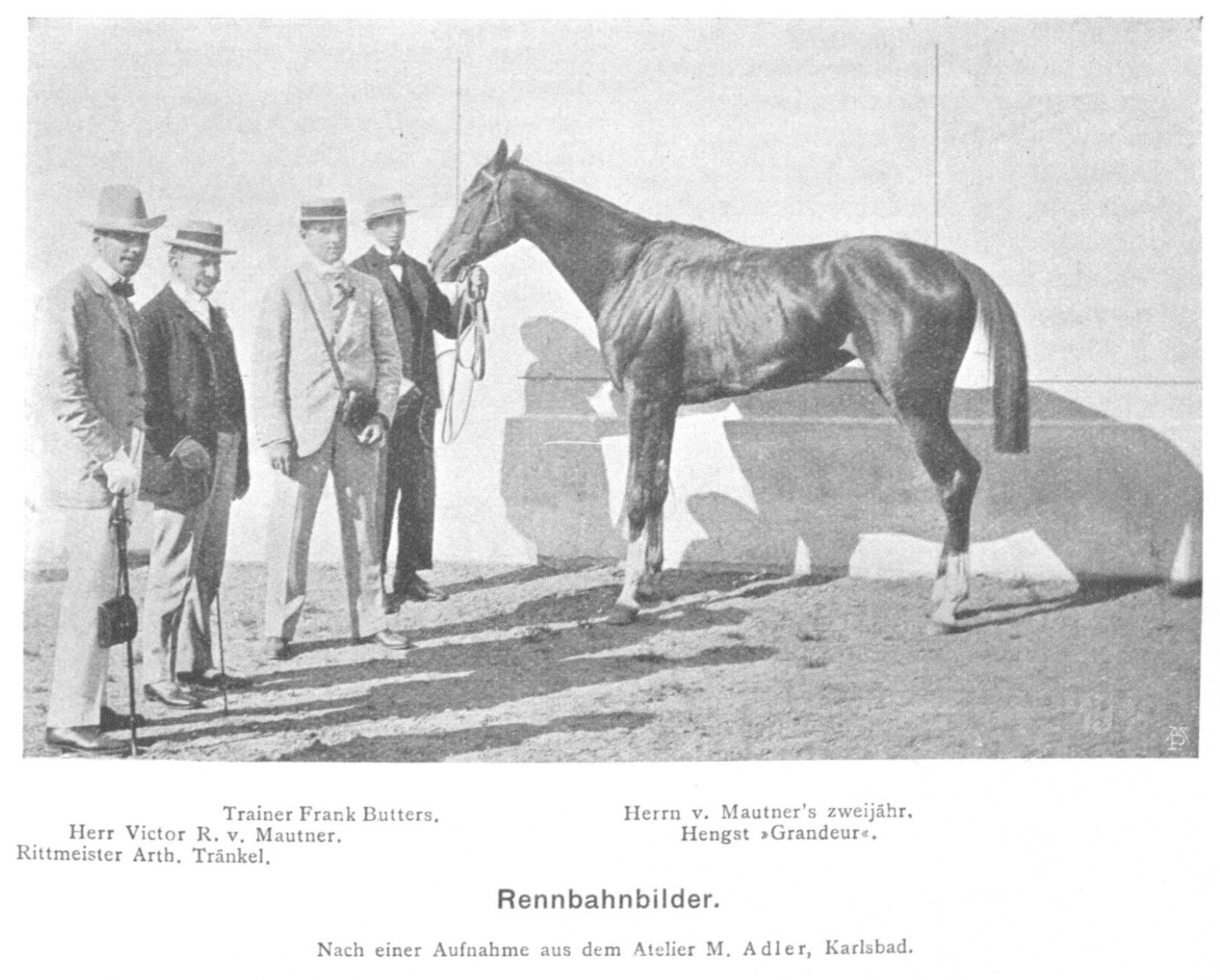
- Jockey Arthur Tränkel, Mr. Victor von Mautner, Frank Butters (third from the left)

Personal information
- Born: 1878 Vienna, Austria
- Died: 1957 (aged 78–79)
- Occupation: Trainer

Horse racing career
- Sport: Horse racing
- Career wins: 1,019 (Great Britain)

Major racing wins
- Princess of Wales's Stakes (1927); Eclipse Stakes (1927, 1928); Champion Stakes (1928, 1929, 1934); Jockey Club Stakes (1934); Dewhurst Stakes (1935); Irish Derby Stakes (1932, 1940, 1948, 1949) British Classic Race wins: 2,000 Guineas Stakes (1); 1,000 Guineas Stakes (1); Epsom Derby (2); Epsom Oaks(6); St. Leger Stakes (5) French Classic Race wins: Prix de l'Arc de Triomphe (1948)

Racing awards
- British Champion Trainer (1927, 1928, 1932, 1934, 1935, 1944, 1946, 1949)

Significant horses
- Beam, Toboggan, Fairway, Udaipur, Light Brocade, Bahram, Mahmoud, Turkhan, Tehran, Steady Aim, Migoli, Masaka,
- Updated on September 18, 2007

Frank Joseph Arthur Butters (1878–1957) was a racehorse trainer specialising in flat racing who trained in Austria, Italy and England in the first half of the 20th century. He trained for two of the most successful owner-breeders in British racing at the time, Lord Derby and HH Aga Khan III, and was British flat racing Champion Trainer on eight occasions.

Frank Butters was born in Vienna, Austria, in 1878 while his father Joseph Butters was training racehorses there. He was educated in Britain but returned to Austria as an assistant to his father. He was interned in Austria during World War I and trained in Italy after the war.

In 1926 he returned to Britain to start a four-year contract as Lord Derby's trainer at Stanley House stables in Newmarket in succession to George Lambton. He trained a number of Classic winners for the Earl and also trained for other owners, winning The Oaks in 1927 for the Earl of Durham. In 1930 Lord Derby terminated Butters' employment but he set up as a public trainer and when the Aga Khan split with Dick Dawson, Butters took over as his trainer.

He trained for the Aga Khan until forced to retire after a serious bicycle accident in 1949. In that period he trained nine Classic winners for the Aga Khan including Mahmoud, who won the 1936 Epsom Derby in a then-record time, and the unbeaten 1935 Triple Crown winner Bahram. He also trained The Oaks winner Steady Aim for Sir Alfred Butt, plus three winners of the Irish Derby for the Aga Khan and won the Prix de l'Arc de Triomphe with Migoli in 1948. His win with Migoli in the "Arc" was the first for an English-trained horse since 1923 and there would not be another until 1971.

He trained 1,019 winners in Great Britain and was Champion Trainer in 1927, 1928, 1932, 1934, 1935, 1944, 1946 and 1949. In 1934 he trained the winners of nine of the 28 races at Royal Ascot. His brother, Fred S. Butters (1888–1967), was also a trainer and won the 1937 Epsom Derby with Mid-day Sun.

== British Classic wins ==
- 1,000 Guineas - (1) - Fair Isle (1930)
- 2,000 Guineas - (1) - Bahram (1935)
- Epsom Oaks - (6) - Beam (1927), Toboggan (1928), Udaipur (1932), Light Brocade (1934), Steady Aim (1946), Masaka (1948)
- Epsom Derby - (2) - Bahram (1935), Mahmoud (1936)
- St. Leger - (5) - Fairway (1928), Firdaussi (1932), Bahram (1935), Turkhan (1940), Tehran (1944)
