= Why Hurry =

British-bred Thoroughbred racehorse

- Sire: Precipitation
- Grandsire: Hurry On
- Dam: Cybiane
- Damsire: Blandford
- Sex: Mare
- Foaled: 1940
- Country: United Kingdom
- Colour: Chestnut
- Breeder: James Voase "Jimmy" Rank
- Owner: James Voase "Jimmy" Rank
- Trainer: Noel Cannon
- Record: 2 wins

Major wins
- New Oaks Stakes (1943)

Why Hurry (1940 – September 1964) was a British Thoroughbred racehorse and broodmare, who raced during World War II and was best known for winning the classic Oaks Stakes in 1943. After winning one minor race as a juvenile she finished fifth in the 1000 Guineas before winning the Oaks, run that year on the July Course at Newmarket Racecourse. After finishing unplaced in the St Leger she was retired from racing and had some success as a broodmare.

== Background ==
Why Hurry was a chestnut filly, bred and owned by James Voase "Jimmy" Rank, the son of Joseph Rank and older brother of the film-maker J. Arthur Rank. Why Hurry’s sire Precipitation was a top class racehorse, best known for winning the Ascot Gold Cup in 1937. He went on to become a successful stallion, siring three other Classic winners in Airborne (Derby Stakes), Chamossaire (St Leger) and Premonition (St Leger) as well as the King George VI and Queen Elizabeth Stakes winner Supreme Court. Precipitation himself was sired by the unbeaten champion, Hurry On, making him a representative of the Godolphin Arabian sire line. Why Hurry's dam Cybiane was an Irish-bred mare who won three minor races in France before being bought for 300 guineas to become a broodmare in England. She was descended from Sacred Ibis, a half-sister of both the disqualified Derby "winner" Craganour and Nassovian who finished third in both the 2000 Guineas and the Derby. Rank sent his filly into training with Noel Cannon at his private Druid's Lodge stable on Salisbury Plain, Wiltshire.

Why Hurry's racing career took place during World War II during which horse racing in Britain was subject to many restrictions. Several major racecourses, including Epsom and Doncaster, were closed for the duration of the conflict, either for safety reasons, or because they were being used by the military. Many important races were rescheduled to new dates and venues, often at short notice, and all five of the Classics were usually run at Newmarket. Wartime austerity also meant that prize money was reduced: Why Hurry's Oaks was worth £1,956 compared to the £8,043 earned by Galatea in 1939.

== Racing career ==
=== 1942: two-year-old season ===
As a two-year-old in 1942, Why Hurry won one minor race over seven furlongs.

=== 1943: three-year-old season ===
In 1943, Why Hurry contested the "New" 1000 Guineas, run on Newmarket's July course rather than its traditional home on the adjoining Rowley Mile. The race was run on 26 May, much later than its customary date in late April or early May. She finished fifth of the twelve runners behind Herringbone.

On 18 June, Why Hurry returned to the July course for the "New" Oaks over 1 1/2 miles and started at odds of 7/1 in a field of thirteen runners. Ridden by Charlie Elliott, she won by a neck from Ribbon who had been left at the start, with Tropical Sun a length away in third and Herringbone in fourth.

In September, Why Hurry contested the "New" St Leger over 1 mile, 6 1/2 furlongs on the July course and finished unplaced behind Herringbone in a field which also included Ribbon, Nasrullah and Straight Deal.

== Assessment ==
In their book A Century of Champions, based on a modified version of the Timeform system, John Randall and Tony Morris rated Why Hurry an "inferior" winner of the Oaks.

== Breeding record ==
Why Hurry was retired from racing to become a broodmare. She produced six minor winners from seven foals:

- Conservative, a chestnut colt, foaled in 1946, sired by Orthodox
- Lingering, bay filly, 1947, by Tehran
- Expeditious, bay colt, 1948, by Hyperion
- Dominant, bay colt, 1949, by Nearco
- Expedition, colt, 1952, by Hyperion
- Jaldikaro, colt, 1955, by Hindostan
- June Evening, filly, 1959, by Robert Barker
- Cutfast, filly, 1962, by Woodcut
- Wish Me Well, colt, 1963, by Woodcut

Why Hurry did in September 1964.

== Pedigree ==
Pedigree of Why Hurry (GB), chestnut mare, 1940
Sire Precipitation (GB) 1933	Hurry On (GB); 1913	Marcovil	Marco
Sire Precipitation (GB) 1933	Hurry On (GB); 1913	Marcovil	Lady Villikins
Sire Precipitation (GB) 1933	Hurry On (GB); 1913	Toute Suite	Sainfoin
Sire Precipitation (GB) 1933	Hurry On (GB); 1913	Toute Suite	Star
Sire Precipitation (GB) 1933	Double Life (GB); 1926	Bachelor's Double	Tredennis
Sire Precipitation (GB) 1933	Double Life (GB); 1926	Bachelor's Double	Lady Bawn
Sire Precipitation (GB) 1933	Double Life (GB); 1926	Saint Joan	Willbrook
Sire Precipitation (GB) 1933	Double Life (GB); 1926	Saint Joan	Flo Desmond
Dam Cybiane (GB) 1930	Blandford (GB); 1919	Swynford	John o' Gaunt
Dam Cybiane (GB) 1930	Blandford (GB); 1919	Swynford	Canterbury Pilgrim
Dam Cybiane (GB) 1930	Blandford (GB); 1919	Blanche	White Eagle
Dam Cybiane (GB) 1930	Blandford (GB); 1919	Blanche	Black Cherry
Dam Cybiane (GB) 1930	Simone Vergnes (GB); 1923	Diadumenos	Orby
Dam Cybiane (GB) 1930	Simone Vergnes (GB); 1923	Diadumenos	Donnetta
Dam Cybiane (GB) 1930	Simone Vergnes (GB); 1923	Incense	Roi Herode
Dam Cybiane (GB) 1930	Simone Vergnes (GB); 1923	Incense	Sacred Ibis (Family: 14-b)
