= King Edward VII Stakes =

Flat horse race in Britain

- Class: Group 2
- Location: Ascot Racecourse; Ascot, England
- Inaugurated: 1834
- Race type: Flat / Thoroughbred
- Website: Ascot

Race information
- Distance: 1m 3f 211y (2,406 metres)
- Surface: Turf
- Track: Right-handed
- Qualification: Three-year-old colts and geldings
- Weight: 9 st 0 lb Penalties; 3 lb for G1 winners * * since 31 August 2017
- Purse: £250,500 (2022); 1st: £142,059

King Edward VII Stakes
2026
Causeway	Ancient Egypt	Water To Wine

Previous years
2025
Amiloc	Zahrann	Galveston
2024
Calandagan	Space Legend	Royal Supremacy
2023
King Of Steel	Continuous	Artistic Star
2022
Changingoftheguard	Grand Alliance	Lysander
2021
Alenquer	Tasman Bay	Title

2020-2011
2020
Pyledriver	Arthur's Kingdom	Mohican Heights
2019
Japan	Bangkok	Eagles By Day
2018
Old Persian	Rostropovich	Giuseppe Garibaldi
2017
Permian	Khalidi	Crystal Ocean
2016
Across The Stars	Beacon Rock	Muntahaa
2015
Balios	Mr Singh	Father Christmas
2014
Eagle Top	Adelaide	Scotland
2013
Hillstar	Battle Of Marengo	Mutashaded
2012
Thomas Chippendale	Noble Mission	Thought Worthy
2011
Nathaniel	Fiorente	Alexander Pope

2010-2001
2010
Monterosso	Arctic Cosmos	Buzzword
2009
Father Time	Your Old Pal	Black Bear Island
2008
Campanologist	Conduit	Top Lock
2007
Boscobel	Lucarno	Yellowstone
2006
Papal Bull	Red Rocks	Sixties Icon
2005
Plea Bargain	Brahminy Kite	The Geezer
2004
Five Dynasties	Elshadi	Barati
2003
High Accolade	Delsarte	Summerland
2002
Balakheri	Bollin Eric	First Charter
2001
Storming Home	Snowstorm	Theatre Script

2000-1991
2000
Subtle Power	Zafonium	Roscius
1999
Mutafaweq	Iscan	Red Sea
1998
Royal Anthem	Kilimanjaro	Scorned
1997
Kingfisher Mill	Palio Sky	Musical Dancer
1996
Amfortas	Oriental Express	Shantou
1995
Pentire	Classic Cliche	Kalabo
1994
Foyer	Pencader	Opera Score
1993
Beneficial	Winged Victory	Azzilfi
1992
Beyton	Jeune	Alflora
1991
Saddlers' Hall	Secret Haunt	Marcus Thorpe

1990-1988
1990
Private Tender	Mukddaam	Air Music
1989
Cacoethes	Zayyani	Spring Hay
1988
Sheriff's Star	Polar Gap	Kalakate

The King Edward VII Stakes is a Group 2 flat horse race in Great Britain open to three-year-old colts and geldings. It is run at Ascot over a distance of 1 mile 3 furlongs and 211 yards (2,406 metres), and it is scheduled to take place each year in June.

The event was established in 1834, and it was originally known as the Ascot Derby. In the early part of its history it was also open to fillies. The race was renamed in memory of King Edward VII in 1926.

The King Edward VII Stakes is currently held about two weeks after The Derby, and it usually features horses which were entered for that race. It is contested on the fourth day of the five-day Royal Ascot meeting.

== Records ==
Leading jockey (7 wins):

- Morny Cannon – St Simon of the Rock (1891), Matchmaker (1895), Conroy (1896), Frontier (1899), Osboch (1901), Flying Lemur (1902), Darley Dale (1904)

Leading trainer (9 wins):

- John Porter – The Palmer (1867), Pero Gomez (1869), Shotover (1882), The Child of the Mist (1885), Matchmaker (1895), Conroy (1896), Frontier (1899), Flying Lemur (1902), Darley Dale (1904)

== Winners since 1900 ==
Year	Winner	Jockey	Trainer	Time
1900	Ecton	Otto Madden	Richard Marsh	2:39.00
1901	Osboch	Mornington Cannon	Richard Marsh
1902	Flying Lemur	Mornington Cannon	John Porter	2:43.40
1903	Kroonstad
1904	Darley Dale	Mornington Cannon	John Porter
1905	Pure Crystal	Herbert Randall	Charles Morton
1906	Poussin	Billy Higgs	Charles Beatty
1907	All Black	Danny Maher	Reg Day
1908	Dibs	Henry Stokes	Sir Charles Nugent	2:40.00
1909	William The Fourth	Bernard Dillon	Henry Davies
1910	Decision	Frank Wootton	George Lambton
1911	King William	Frank Wootton	George Lambton
1912	Jaeger	Walter Griggs	Peter Gilpin
1913	Pilliwinkie	Danny Maher	Alec Taylor Jr.	2:32.20
1914	Corcyra	Herbert Jones	Captain Robert Dewhurst	2:32.80
1915-18	No race
1919	Old Bill	Henri Jelliss	George Blackwell
1920	Caligula	Joe Childs	Harvey Leader
1921	Nippon	Frank Bullock	Basil Jarvis
1922	Blackwood	Jack Brennan	Harry Cottrill	2:32.60
1923	Bold And Bad	Frank Bullock	Alec Taylor Jr.	2:36.80
1924	Polyphontes	William McLachlan Sr.	Etienne de Mestre	2:43.00
1925	Solario	Michael Beary	Reg Day	2:33.80
1926	Finglas	George Archibald Sr.	Peter Gilpin	2:42.40
1927	Buckfast	Jack Evans	Reg Day	2:35.00
1928	Cyclonic	Bobby Jones	Basil Jarvis	2:38.20
1929	Horus	Charlie Elliott	Jack Jarvis	2:35.20
1930	Pinxit	Bernard Carslake	Norman Scobie	2:40.20
1931	Sandwich	Harry Wragg	Jack Jarvis	2:39.80
1932	Dastur	Michael Beary	Frank Butters	2:39.20
1933	Sans Peine	Eph Smith	Jack Jarvis	2:37.80
1934	Berestoi	Billy Nevett	Matthew Peacock	2:36.00
1935	Field Trial	Bobby Dick	Joseph Lawson	2:37.80
1936	Precipitation	Rufus Beasley	Cecil Boyd-Rochfort	2:32.80
1937	Solfo	Tommy Lowrey	Basil Jarvis	2:37.80
1938	Foroughi	Harry Wragg	Frank Butters	2:32.60
1939	Hypnotist	Rufus Beasley	Cecil Boyd-Rochfort	2:36.00
1940-45	No race
1946	Field Day	Gordon Richards	Frank Butters	2:47.00
1947	Migoli	Gordon Richards	Frank Butters	2:37.60
1948	Vic Day	Rae Johnstone	Herbert Blagrave	2:36.00
1949	Swallow Tail	Doug Smith	Walter Earl	2:34.00
1950	Babu's Pet	Tommy Burn	George Duller	2:42.00
1951	Supreme Court	Charlie Elliott	Evan Williams	2:33.60
1952	Castleton	Doug Smith	Tommy Carey	2:33.00
1953	Skyraider	Roger Poincelet	Richard Carver	2:39.40
1954	Rashleigh	Sir Gordon Richards	Noel Murless	2:40.20
1955	Nucleus	Lester Piggott	C F Jerdain	2:33.60
1956	Court Command	Lester Piggott	Noel Murless	2:34.80
1957	Arctic Explorer	Lester Piggott	Noel Murless	2:32.42
1958	Restoration	Harry Carr	Cecil Boyd-Rochfort	2:32.92
1959	Pindari	Lester Piggott	Noel Murless	2:31.06
1960	Atrax	Roger Poincelet	H Nicholas	2:35.70
1961	Aurelius	Lester Piggott	Noel Murless	2:36.78
1962	Gaul	Geoff Lewis	Peter Hastings-Bass	2:33.26
1963	Only For Life	Jimmy Lindley	Jeremy Tree	2:42.86
1964	Abandoned due to waterlogging
1965	Convamore	Joe Mercer	Ron Smyth	2:36.74
1966	Pretendre	Paul Cook	Jack Jarvis	2:39.47
1967	Mariner	Greville Starkey	John Oxley	2:35.46
1968	Connaught	Sandy Barclay	Noel Murless	2:35.53
1969	Vervain	Eddie Hide	Peter Nelson	2:33.92
1970	Great Wall	Bill Williamson	Scobie Breasley	2:32.25
1971	Sea Friend	Joe Mercer	Paddy Prendergast	2:40.44
1972	Lord Nelson	Bill Williamson	George Todd	2:34.39
1973	Klairvimy	Buster Parnell	Dermot Weld	2:42.21
1974	English Prince	Pat Eddery	Peter Walwyn	2:29.88
1975	Sea Anchor	Joe Mercer	Dick Hern	2:32.11
1976	Marquis de Sade	Brian Taylor	Ryan Price	2:31.25
1977	Classic Example	Pat Eddery	Peter Walwyn	2:39.67
1978	Ile de Bourbon	John Reid	Fulke Johnson Houghton	2:34.74
1979	Ela-Mana-Mou	Greville Starkey	Guy Harwood	2:31.68
1980	Light Cavalry	Joe Mercer	Henry Cecil	2:33.86
1981	Bustomi	Willie Carson	Dick Hern	2:29.34
1982	Open Day	Willie Carson	Dick Hern	2:30.65
1983	Shareef Dancer	Walter Swinburn	Michael Stoute	2:31.15
1984	Head for Heights	Willie Carson	Dick Hern	2:31.91
1985	Lanfranco	Steve Cauthen	Henry Cecil	2:28.77
1986	Bonhomie	Steve Cauthen	Henry Cecil	2:31.88
1987	Love the Groom	Pat Eddery	John Dunlop	2:32.05
1988	Sheriff's Star	Tony Ives	Lady Herries	2:29.27
1989	Cacoethes	Pat Eddery	Guy Harwood	2:29.67
1990	Private Tender	Steve Cauthen	Henry Cecil	2:31.94
1991	Saddlers' Hall	Lester Piggott	Michael Stoute	2:31.63
1992	Beyton	Michael Kinane	Richard Hannon Sr.	2:29.41
1993	Beneficial	Michael Hills	Geoff Wragg	2:33.88
1994	Foyer	Michael Kinane	Michael Stoute	2:31.06
1995	Pentire	Michael Hills	Geoff Wragg	2:28.75
1996	Amfortas	Brett Doyle	Clive Brittain	2:29.85
1997	Kingfisher Mill	Pat Eddery	Julie Cecil	2:38.36
1998	Royal Anthem	Kieren Fallon	Henry Cecil	2:34.53
1999	Mutafaweq	Frankie Dettori	Saeed bin Suroor	2:29.48
2000	Subtle Power	Richard Quinn	Henry Cecil	2:35.92
2001	Storming Home	Michael Hills	Barry Hills	2:30.31
2002	Balakheri	Johnny Murtagh	Sir Michael Stoute	2:30.45
2003	High Accolade	Martin Dwyer	Marcus Tregoning	2:28.45
2004	Five Dynasties	Jamie Spencer	Aidan O'Brien	2:32.26
2005 (Note: The 2005 running took place at York)	Plea Bargain	Jimmy Fortune	John Gosden	2:29.44
2006	Papal Bull	Kieren Fallon	Sir Michael Stoute	2:28.02
2007	Boscobel	Joe Fanning	Mark Johnston	2:37.13
2008	Campanologist	Frankie Dettori	Saeed bin Suroor	2:31.24
2009	Father Time	Eddie Ahern	Henry Cecil	2:27:37
2010	Monterosso	Frankie Dettori	Mark Johnston	2:30.06
2011	Nathaniel	William Buick	John Gosden	2:34.48
2012	Thomas Chippendale	Johnny Murtagh	Sir Henry Cecil	2:35.41
2013	Hillstar	Ryan Moore	Sir Michael Stoute	2:30.09
2014	Eagle Top	William Buick	John Gosden	2:27.98
2015	Balios	Jamie Spencer	David Simcock	2:29.05
2016	Across the Stars	Frankie Dettori	Sir Michael Stoute	2:35.18
2017	Permian	William Buick	Mark Johnston	2:30.10
2018	Old Persian	William Buick	Charlie Appleby	2:29.95
2019	Japan	Ryan Moore	Aidan O'Brien	2:29.16
2020	Pyledriver	Martin Dwyer	William Muir	2:32.21
2021	Alenquer	Tom Marquand	William Haggas	2:41.31
2022	Changingoftheguard	Ryan Moore	Aidan O'Brien	2:30.44
2023	King of Steel	Kevin Stott	Roger Varian	2:35.30
2024	Calandagan	Stéphane Pasquier	Francis Henri Graffard	2:29.11
2025	Amiloc	Rossa Ryan	Ralph Beckett	2:28.67
2026	Causeway	Ryan Moore	Aidan O'Brien	2:28.76

== Earlier winners ==
- 1834: Pussy
- 1835: Griselda
- 1836: Lieutenant
- 1837: Mango
- 1838: no race
- 1839: Bloomsbury
- 1840: Bokhara
- 1841: Coronation
- 1842: Envoy
- 1843: Amorino
- 1844: The Miser Scarve
- 1845: Wood Pigeon
- 1846: Bravissimo
- 1847: Conyngham
- 1848: Distaffina
- 1849: Repletion
- 1850: Musician
- 1851: Phlegethon
- 1852: Convulsion
- 1853: Ninnyhammer
- 1854: Phaeton
- 1855: Pugnator
- 1856: Fly-by-Night
- 1857: Sydney
- 1858: Toxophilite
- 1859: Gamester
- 1860: The Wizard
- 1861: Janus
- 1862: Carisbrook
- 1863: Onesander
- 1864: Peon
- 1865: Celerimma
- 1866: Staghound
- 1867: The Palmer
- 1868: The Earl
- 1869: Pero Gomez
- 1870: King Cole
- 1871: Henry
- 1872: Drumochter
- 1873: Gang Forward
- 1874: Atlantic
- 1875: Gilbert
- 1876: Forerunner
- 1877: Silvio
- 1878: Insulaire
- 1879: Chippendale
- 1880: Mask
- 1881: Maskelyne
- 1882: Shotover
- 1883: Ladislas
- 1884: Brest
- 1885: The Child of the Mist
- 1886: St Mirin
- 1887: Timothy
- 1888: Sheen
- 1889: Morglay
- 1890: Battle-axe
- 1891: St Simon of the Rock
- 1892: Llanthony
- 1893: Phocion
- 1894: None the Wiser
- 1895: Matchmaker
- 1896: Conroy
- 1897: Minstrel
- 1898: Purser
- 1899: Frontier

== See also ==
- Horse racing in Great Britain
- List of British flat horse races
- Recurring sporting events established in 1834 – this race is included under its original title, Ascot Derby Stakes.
