= Blue Riband Trial Stakes =

Flat horse race in Britain

- Class: Listed
- Location: Epsom Downs; Epsom, England
- Inaugurated: 1937
- Race type: Flat / Thoroughbred
- Sponsor: Betfred
- Website: Epsom Downs

Race information
- Distance: 1m 2f 17y (2,027 m)
- Surface: Turf
- Track: Left-handed
- Qualification: Three-year-olds
- Weight: 9 st 3 lb Allowances; 5 lb for fillies Penalties; 5 lb for Group 1 or 2 winners 3 lb for Group 3 or Listed winners
- Purse: £50,000 (2024); 1st: £28,355
- Bonuses: Wildcard Derby entry

Epsom Derby Trial
2026
Saxon Street	Rebel Rocker	Balzac

Previous years
2025
Sea Scout	Trinity College	Mirabeau
2024
Bellum Justum	Defiance	Chief Little Rock
2023
Epictetus	Hadrianus	Cite D'Or
2022
Nahanni	Grand Alliance	Zain Sarinda
2021
Wirko	Technique	Uncle Bryn

2020-2011
2019
Cape Of Good Hope	Cap Francais	Turgenev
2018
Crossed Baton	My Lord And Master	Dee Ex Bee
2017
Cracksman	Permian	Bay Of Poets
2016
So Mi Dar	Humphrey Bogart	Viren's Army
2015
Christophermarlowe	Future Empire	Sharp Sailor
2014
Our Channel	Marzocco	Stars Over The Sea
2013
Mirsaale	Another Cocktail	Gabrial's Kaka
2012
Goldoni	Mister Music	Cameron Highland
2011
Slumber	Borug	Planet Waves

2010-2001
2010
Dreamspeed	Prompter	Togiak
2009
Debussy	Midday	Popmurphy
2008
Curtain Call	Drill Sergeant	Bold Choice
2007
Raincoat	Dubai Twilight	Spirit of The Mist
2006
Before You Go	Hanoona	Sienna Storm
2005
Hallhoo	Elliots World	Love Palace
2004
Bull Run	Bowstring	Mutafanen
2003
Franklins Gardens	Gala Sunday	Silver Gilt
2002
Swing Wing	Mine Host	Savannah Bay
2001
Storming Home	Tamiami Trail	Black Knight

2000-1991
2000
Eternal Spring	Modish	Galleon Beach
1999
Daliapour	Lightning Arrow	Helvetius
1998
The Glow-Worm	Achilles	Dashing Chief
1997
Palio Sky	Papua	Mister Pink
1991
Fair Average	Persianalli	Redden Burn

1990-1988
1990
Eton Lad	Lifewatch Vision	Mutah
1989
Shining Steel	Dawn Success	Tatsfield
1988
Shuja	St Cadoc	Ilishpour

The Blue Riband Trial Stakes is a Listed flat horse race in Great Britain open to three-year-old horses. It is run over a distance of 1 mile, 2 furlongs and 17 yards (2,027 metres) at Epsom in April.

== History ==
Established in 1937, the Blue Riband Trial Stakes replaced a previous event called the Nonsuch Plate. It was originally contested over 1 mile and 110 yards.

The present system of race grading was introduced in 1971, and the Blue Riband Trial Stakes was given Group 3 status. It was relegated to Listed level in 1986, and it later became an ungraded conditions race.

The Blue Riband Trial Stakes was discontinued for several years in the mid-1990s. It returned in 1997, and from this point its distance was 1 mile, 4 furlongs and 10 yards. It was cut to 1 mile, 2 furlongs and 18 yards in 1999.

The race was renamed the Investec Derby Trial in 2010, when the banking group Investec took over the sponsorship. The race reverted to its original name of Blue Riband Trial from the 2018 running.

The event can serve as a trial for The Derby (flat racing's "Blue Riband"). It was upgraded to Listed status again in 2018.

The last winner of the trial to achieve victory in the Derby was Blue Peter in 1939.

== Records ==
Leading jockey (5 wins):

- Harry Carr - Premonition (1953), Ambler II (1954), Sierra Nevada (1955), Tempest (1957), Miner's Lamp (1958)
- Frankie Dettori - Christophermarlowe (2015), So Mi Dar (2016), Cracksman (2017), Crossed Baton (2018), Epictetus (2023)

Leading trainer (8 wins):

- John Gosden - Raincoat (2007), Debussy (2009), Christophermarlowe (2015), So Mi Dar (2016), Cracksman (2017), Crossed Baton (2018), Epictetus (2023), Saxon Street (2026)

== Winners ==
Year	Winner	Jockey	Trainer	Time
1937	Printer	Tommy Lowrey	Basil Jarvis	1:53.00
1938	Chatsworth	Eph Smith	Ted Leader	1:44.40
1939	Blue Peter	Eph Smith	Jack Jarvis	1:44.80
	no race 1940–46
1947	Combat	Gordon Richards	Fred Darling	1:53.20
1948	King's Counsel	Sam Wragg	Victor Smyth	1:46.00
1949	Grani	Tommy Burn	Ted Leader	1:46.00
1950	Port O'Light	Tommy Gosling	Walter Nightingall	1:47.20
1951	Zucchero	Lester Piggott	Ken Cundell	1:46.00
1952	Castleton	Gordon Richards	Tommy Carey	1:48.40
1953	Premonition	Harry Carr	Cecil Boyd-Rochfort	1:44.80
1954	Ambler II	Harry Carr	Cecil Boyd-Rochfort	1:46.60
1955	Sierra Nevada	Harry Carr	Cecil Boyd-Rochfort	1:49.00
1956	Monterey	Willie Snaith	Sam Armstrong	1:46.20
1957	Tempest	Harry Carr	Cecil Boyd-Rochfort	1:48.20
1958	Miner's Lamp	Harry Carr	Cecil Boyd-Rochfort	1:45.60
1959	My Aladdin	Stan Clayton	Walter Nightingall	1:49.80
1960	Vienna	Geoff Lewis	Walter Nightingall	1:45.60
1961	No Fiddling	Jimmy Lindley	R Greenhill	1:45.00
1962	Cyrus	Bill Rickaby	Geoffrey Brooke	1:47.80
1963	The Bo'sun	Stan Smith	Jack Jarvis	1:49.20
1964	Minor Portion	Jimmy Lindley	Jeremy Tree	1:55.54
1965	Cambridge	Willie Snaith	Bruce Hobbs	1:48.29
1966	Pretendre	Paul Cook	Jack Jarvis	1:57.08
1967	Starry Halo	Lester Piggott	J Thompson	1:49.61
1968	Society	Bill Williamson	Paddy Prendergast	1:47.60
1969	Caliban	Sandy Barclay	Noel Murless	1:50.40
1970	Decies	Lester Piggott	Bernard van Cutsem	1:52.49
1971	Spoiled Lad	Ernie Johnson	Bernard van Cutsem	1:43.99
1972	Baragoi	Willie Carson	Bernard van Cutsem	1:49.48
1973	Gospill Hill	Geoff Lewis	Noel Murless	1:47.84
1974	Pitcairn	Ron Hutchinson	John Dunlop	1:44.58
1975	Romper	Frank Morby	Fulke Johnson Houghton	1:55.26
1976	Oats	Pat Eddery	Peter Walwyn	1:46.26
1977	Be My Guest	Lester Piggott	Vincent O'Brien	1:46.45
1978	Roland Gardens	Frankie Durr	Duncan Sasse	1:48.56
1979	Foveros	Edward Hide	Clive Brittain	1:51.28
1980	Last Fandango	Steve Cauthen	Barry Hills	1:43.95
1981	Centurius	Walter Swinburn	Michael Stoute	1:45.17
1982	Count Pahlen	Geoff Baxter	Bruce Hobbs	1:43.59
1983	Abandoned due to waterlogging
1984	Long Pond	George Duffield	Paul Kelleway	1:44.70
1985	Lightning Dealer	Pat Eddery	Paul Kelleway	1:47.60
1986	Beldale Star	Greville Starkey	Guy Harwood	2:58.25
1987	Lyphento	Greville Starkey	Guy Harwood	2:39.99
1988	Shuja	Richard Hills	Harry Thomson Jones	1:55.08
1989	Shining Steel	Steve Cauthen	Henry Cecil	1:54.30
1990	Eton Lad	Pat Eddery	Neville Callaghan	1:44.28
1991 (Note: The 1991 running took place at Kempton Park over a distance of 1 mile)	Fair Average	Chris Rutter	Henry Candy	1:40.05
	no race 1992–96
1997	Palio Sky	Pat Eddery	John Dunlop	2:39.94
1998	The Glow-Worm	Michael Hills	Barry Hills	2:51.44
1999	Daliapour	Gérald Mossé	Luca Cumani	2:13.38
2000	Eternal Spring	Kieren Fallon	Ed Dunlop	2:20.81
2001	Storming Home	Michael Hills	Barry Hills	2:20.79
2002	Swing Wing	Jimmy Fortune	Paul Cole	2:11.17
2003	Franklins Gardens	Darryll Holland	Mark Tompkins	2:09.70
2004	Bull Run	Johnny Murtagh	David Loder	2:20.44
2005	Hallhoo	Ted Durcan	Mick Channon	2:14.56
2006	Before You Go	Ian Mongan	Terry Mills	2:14.02
2007	Raincoat	Richard Hughes	John Gosden	2:08.35
2008 (Note: The 2008 edition was run at Nottingham over 1 mile, 2 furlongs and 50 yards)	Curtain Call	Jamie Spencer	Luca Cumani	2:14.44
2009	Debussy	Jimmy Fortune	John Gosden	2:08.92
2010	Dreamspeed	Jimmy Fortune	Andrew Balding	2:09.88
2011	Slumber	Michael Hills	Barry Hills	2:08.98
2012	Goldoni	David Probert	Andrew Balding	2:22.00
2013	Mirsaale	Neil Callan	James Tate	2:08.35
2014	Our Channel	Ryan Moore	William Haggas	2:10.57
2015	Christophermarlowe	Frankie Dettori	John Gosden	2:07.92
2016	So Mi Dar	Frankie Dettori	John Gosden	2:18.97
2017	Cracksman	Frankie Dettori	John Gosden	2:10.73
2018	Crossed Baton	Frankie Dettori	John Gosden	2:11.35
2019	Cape Of Good Hope	Ryan Moore	Aidan O'Brien	2:06.28
	no race 2020 (Note: The 2020 running was cancelled because of the COVID-19 pandemic in the United Kingdom)
2021	Wirko	William Buick	Charlie Appleby	2:11.41
2022	Nahanni	William Buick	Charlie Appleby	2:10.48
2023	Epictetus	Frankie Dettori	John & Thady Gosden	2:20.00
2024	Bellum Justum	Oisin Murphy	Andrew Balding	2:08.75
2025	Sea Scout	Harry Davies	Simon & Ed Crisford	2:08.69
2026	Saxon Street	William Buick	John & Thady Gosden	2:09.27

== See also ==
- Horse racing in Great Britain
- List of British flat horse races
