= Princess of Wales's Stakes =

Flat horse race in Britain

- Class: Group 2
- Location: July Course; Newmarket, England
- Inaugurated: 1894
- Race type: Flat / Thoroughbred
- Sponsor: Tattersalls
- Website: Newmarket

Race information
- Distance: 1m 4f (2,414 metres)
- Surface: Turf
- Track: Right-hand "L"
- Qualification: Three-years-old and up
- Weight: 8 st 8 lb (3yo); 9 st 6 lb (4yo+); Allowances; 3 lb for fillies and mares Penalties; 5 lb for Group 1 winners * 3 lb for Group 2 winners * * after 2019
- Purse: £115,000 (2021); 1st: £65,216

Princess Of Wales's Stakes
2026
Rebel's Romance	Arabian Crown	Almeric

Previous years
2025
El Cordobes	Wimbledon Hawkeye	Arabian Crown
2024
Giavellotto	Arrest	Time Lock
2023
Israr	Adayar	Global Storm
2022
Yibir	Living Legend	Global Storm
2021
Sir Ron Priestley	Al Aasy	Star Safari

2020-2011
2020
Dame Malliot	Communique	Desert Encounter
2019
Communique	Mirage Dancer	Desert Encounter
2018
Best Solution	Mirage Dancer	Duretto
2016
Big Orange	The Grey Gatsby	Exosphere
2015
Big Orange	Second Step	Gospel Choir
2014
Cavalryman	Hillstar	Pether's Moon
2013
Universal	Ahzeemah	Cavalryman
2012
Fiorente	Joshua Tree	Red Cadeaux
2011
Crystal Capella	Redwood	Buthelezi

2010-2001
2010
Sans Frontieres	Redwood	Tazeez
2009
Doctor Fremantle	Alwaary	Schiaparelli
2008
Lucarno	Papal Bull	Petara Bay
2007
Papal Bull	Laverock	Shahin
2006
Soapy Danger	Mountain High	Enforcer
2005
Gamut	Day Flight	Dubai Success
2004
Bandari	Sulamani	High Accolade
2003
Millenary	Bandari	Gamut
2002
Millenary	Mubtaker	Yavana's Pace
2001
Mutamam	Little Rock	Holding Court

2000-1991
2000
Little Rock	Yavana's Pace	Commander Collins
1999
Craigsteel	Arctic Owl	Silver Rhapsody
1998
Fruits Of Love	Multicoloured	Germano
1997
Shantou	Swain	Taipan
1996
Posidonas	Singspiel	Annus Mirabilis
1995
Beauchamp Hero	Istidaad	Presenting
1994
Wagon Master	Bobzao	Prince Of Andros
1993
Desert Team	Young Buster	Red Bishop
1992
Saddlers' Hall	Luchiroverte	Mashaallah
1991
Rock Hopper	Mukddaam	Splash Of Colour

1990-1988
1990
Sapience	Charmer	Assatis
1989
Carroll House	Assatis	Michelozzo
1988
Unfuwain	Undercut	Infamy

The Princess of Wales's Stakes is a Group 2 flat horse race in Great Britain open to Thoroughbred horses aged three years or older. It is run on the July Course at Newmarket over a distance of 1 mile and 4 furlongs (2,414 metres), and takes place each year in July.

== History ==
The event is named in honour of Alexandra of Denmark, who became the Princess of Wales in 1863. It was established in 1894, and the inaugural running was won by Isinglass. In its early history, the race was one of the British season's most valuable and prestigious all-aged races. It was initially contested over a mile, and it was extended to its current distance in 1902.

The present system of race grading was introduced in 1971, and for a period the Princess of Wales's Stakes was classed at Group 3 level. It was promoted to Group 2 status in 1978. It is now held on the opening day of Newmarket's three-day July Festival meeting.

== Records ==
Most successful horse (2 wins):

- Lance Chest – 1912, 1913
- Primera – 1959, 1960
- Lomond – 1965, 1966
- Millenary – 2002, 2003
- Big Orange – 2015, 2016

Leading jockey (8 wins):

- Lester Piggott – Zucchero (1952), Primera (1959, 1960), Apostle (1961), Lord Helpus (1977), Pollerton (1978), Light Cavalry (1981), Head for Heights (1984)

Leading trainer (9 wins):

- Sir Michael Stoute – Shardari (1986), Rock Hopper (1991), Saddlers' Hall (1992), Little Rock (2000), Gamut (2005), Papal Bull (2007), Doctor Fremantle (2009), Crystal Capella (2011), Fiorente (2012)

== Winners ==
Year	Winner	Age	Jockey	Trainer	Time
1894	Isinglass	4	Tommy Loates	James Jewitt
1895	Le Var
1896	St. Frusquin	3	Tommy Loates	Alfred Hayhoe
1897	Velasquez	3
1898	Goletta	4	Tommy Loates	Alfred Hayhoe	1:44.00
1899	Flying Fox	3	Mornington Cannon	John Porter
1900	Merry Gal	3	Johnny Reiff	Jack Robinson	1:42.00
1901	Epsom Lad	4	Santiago Gomez	Leandro Alvarez	1:41.00
1902	Veles	4	Skeets Martin	Robert Sherwood Jr.
1903	Ard Patrick	4		Sam Darling
1904	Rock Sand	4	Danny Maher	George Blackwell
1905	St Denis	4	Danny Maher	Charles Peck
1906	Dinneford	4	Otto Madden	Alec Taylor Jr.
1907	Polymelus	5	Danny Maher	Charles Peck
1908	Queen's Advocate	4	Otto Madden	Alec Taylor Jr.
1909	Dark Ronald	4	Barry Lynham	James Clement
1910	Ulster King	3	Steve Donoghue	Lewis
1911	Swynford	4	Frank Wootton	George Lambton
1912	Lance Chest	3	Walter Griggs	Peter Gilpin	2:36.80
1913	Lance Chest	4	Walter Griggs	Peter Gilpin	2:34.20
1914	The Curragh	4	Jim Clark	Alec Taylor Jr.	2:36.80
1915	Rossendale	3	Herbert Jones	Hazleton	2:36.20
1916	Nassovian	3	Nathan Spear	Frank Butters	2:37.60
1917	No Race
1918	Blink	3	Vic Smyth	Alec Taylor Jr.
1919	Buchan	3	Joe Childs	Alec Taylor Jr.
1920	Attilius	3	George Hulme	Richard Dawson
1921	Orpheus	4	Hector Gray	Felix Leach	2:30.40
1922	Blandford	3	George Hulme	Richard Dawson	2:31.80
1923	Triumph	4	Joe Childs	John Watson	2:32.60
1924	Salmon-Trout	3	Vic Smyth	Richard Dawson	2:36.40
1925	Solario	3	Joe Childs	Reg Day	2:35.00
1926	Tournesol	4	Joe Childs	Alec Taylor Jr.	2:38.00
1927	Colorado	4	Tommy Weston	Frank Butters	2:35.00
1928	Tourist	3	Johnny Dines	Reg Day	2:30.40
1929	Fairway	4	Tommy Weston	Frank Butters	2:34.00
1930	Press Gang	3	Freddie Fox	Fred Darling
1931 (dh)	Shell Transport; The Recorder	3; 4	Bobby Dick; Freddie Fox	Joseph Lawson; Fred Darling	2:33.00
1932	Jacopo	4	Joe Childs	Cecil Boyd-Rochfort	2:31.80
1933	Raymond	3	Sir Gordon Richards	Joseph Lawson	2:33.40
1934	Bright Bird	3	Freddie Fox	Joseph Lawson	2:34.60
1935	Fairbairn	3	Sir Gordon Richards	Victor Gilpin	2:32.00
1936	Taj Akbar	3	Charlie Smirke	Frank Butters	2:34.60
1937	Flares	4	Bobby Jones	Cecil Boyd-Rochfort	2:34.00
1938	Pound Foolish	3	Sir Gordon Richards	Joseph Lawson	2:31.60
1939	Heliopolis	3	Richard Perryman	Walter Earl	2:30.60
1940-44	No Race
1945	Stirling Castle	3	Eph Smith	Joseph Lawson	2:29.00
1946	Airborne	3	Tommy Lowrey	Richard Perryman	2:47.00
1947	Nirgal	4	Charlie Elliott	Dick Warden
1948	Alycidon	3	Tommy Lowrey	Walter Earl	2:34.60
1949	Dogger Bank	3	Doug Smith	Walter Earl	2:34.20
1950	Double Eclipse	3	Harry Carr	Cecil Boyd-Rochfort	2:36.80
1951	Pardal	4	Rae Johnstone	In France	2:35.60
1952	Zucchero	4	Lester Piggott	Bill Payne	2:36.00
1953	Rawson	4	Ken Gethin	Stanley Wootton	2:34.20
1954	Woodcut	3	Eph Smith	Cecil Boyd-Rochfort	2:35.33
1955	Cobetto	3	Jean Massard	Charles Semblat	2:31.50
1956	Cash And Courage	3	Eph Smith	Sam Hall	2:31.20
1957	Wake Up!	3	Doug Smith	John F Watts	2:35.78
1958	Miner's Lamp	3	Harry Carr	Cecil Boyd-Rochfort	2:39.91
1959	Primera	5	Lester Piggott	Noel Murless	2:37.76
1960	Primera	6	Lester Piggott	Noel Murless	2:42.50
1961	Apostle	4	Lester Piggott	Staff Ingham	2:55.80
1962	Silver Cloud	3	Eph Smith	Jack Jarvis	2:34.08
1963	Trafalgar	3	Scobie Breasley	Sir Gordon Richards	2:44.88
1964	Carrack	3	Des Cullen	John Oxley	2:31.57
1965	Lomond	5	Eric Eldin	Ryan Jarvis	2:39.20
1966	Lomond	6	Eric Eldin	Ryan Jarvis	2:34.33
1967	Hopeful Venture	3	George Moore	Noel Murless	2:34.55
1968	Mount Athos	3	Ron Hutchinson	John Dunlop	2:32.10
1969	Harmony Hall	3	Willie Carson	Gordon Smyth	2:47.00
1970	Prince Consort	4	Sandy Barclay	Noel Murless	2:36.18
1971	Lupe	4	Geoff Lewis	Noel Murless	2:42.84
1972	Falkland	4	Greville Starkey	Henry Cecil	2:33.26
1973	Our Mirage	4	Frankie Durr	Barry Hills	2:34.32
1974	Buoy	4	Joe Mercer	Dick Hern	2:31.10
1975	Libra's Rib	3	Willie Carson	Fulke Johnson Houghton	2:30.83
1976	Smuggler	4	Ernie Johnson	Dick Hern	2:34.16
1977	Lord Helpus	4	Lester Piggott	Barry Hills	2:33.01
1978	Pollerton	4	Lester Piggott	Harry Thomson Jones	2:37.20
1979	Milford	3	Willie Carson	Dick Hern	2:30.36
1980	Nicholas Bill	5	Philip Waldron	Henry Candy	2:37.01
1981	Light Cavalry	4	Lester Piggott	Henry Cecil	2:32.11
1982	Height of Fashion	3	Willie Carson	Dick Hern	2:29.31
1983	Quilted	3	Billy Newnes	Mick O'Toole	2:32.75
1984	Head for Heights	3	Lester Piggott	Dick Hern	2:34.64
1985	Petoski	3	Willie Carson	Dick Hern	2:31.02
1986	Shardari	4	Walter Swinburn	Michael Stoute	2:31.25
1987	Celestial Storm	4	Ray Cochrane	Luca Cumani	2:28.68
1988	Unfuwain	3	Willie Carson	Dick Hern	2:31.83
1989	Carroll House	4	Walter Swinburn	Michael Jarvis	2:33.23
1990	Sapience	4	Pat Eddery	Jimmy FitzGerald	2:34.96
1991	Rock Hopper	4	Pat Eddery	Michael Stoute	2:33.47
1992	Saddlers' Hall	4	Pat Eddery	Michael Stoute	2:31.01
1993	Desert Team	3	Willie Carson	Jim Bolger	2:26.70
1994	Wagon Master	4	Richard Hills	Alec Stewart	2:27.53
1995	Beauchamp Hero	5	John Reid	John Dunlop	2:28.83
1996	Posidonas	4	Richard Quinn	Paul Cole	2:28.92
1997	Shantou	4	Frankie Dettori	John Gosden	2:29.16
1998	Fruits of Love	3	Michael Hills	Mark Johnston	2:28.76
1999	Craigsteel	4	Kieren Fallon	Henry Cecil	2:25.29
2000	Little Rock	4	Pat Eddery	Sir Michael Stoute	2:33.30
2001	Mutamam	6	Richard Hills	Alec Stewart	2:28.82
2002	Millenary	5	Pat Eddery	John Dunlop	2:32.22
2003	Millenary	6	Pat Eddery	John Dunlop	2:27.60
2004	Bandari	5	Richard Hills	Mark Johnston	2:32.90
2005	Gamut	6	Kieren Fallon	Sir Michael Stoute	2:29.98
2006	Soapy Danger	3	Kevin Darley	Mark Johnston	2:32.82
2007	Papal Bull	4	Ryan Moore	Sir Michael Stoute	2:28.73
2008	Lucarno	4	Jimmy Fortune	John Gosden	2:33.37
2009	Doctor Fremantle	4	Ryan Moore	Sir Michael Stoute	2:30.70
2010	Sans Frontieres	4	Tom Queally	Jeremy Noseda	2:30.34
2011	Crystal Capella	6	Ryan Moore	Sir Michael Stoute	2:31.57
2012	Fiorente	4	Ryan Moore	Sir Michael Stoute	2:33.76
2013	Universal	4	Joe Fanning	Mark Johnston	2:28.45
2014	Cavalryman	8	Silvestre de Sousa	Saeed bin Suroor	2:37.04
2015	Big Orange	4	Jamie Spencer	Michael Bell	2:29.00
2016	Big Orange	5	James McDonald	Michael Bell	2:29.93
2017	Hawkbill	4	James Doyle	Charlie Appleby	2:31.00
2018	Best Solution	4	Pat Cosgrave	Saeed bin Suroor	2:31.40
2019	Communique	4	Silvestre de Sousa	Mark Johnston	2:28.63
2020	Dame Malliot	4	Hollie Doyle	Ed Vaughan	2:34.40
2021	Sir Ron Priestley	5	Franny Norton	Mark Johnston	2:29.15
2022	Yibir	4	William Buick	Charlie Appleby	2:28.91
2023	Israr	4	Jim Crowley	John and Thady Gosden	2:27.33
2024	Giavellotto	5	Oisin Murphy	Marco Botti	2:31.20
2025	El Cordobes	4	William Buick	Charlie Appleby	2:32.36
2026	Rebel's Romance	8	William Buick	Charlie Appleby	2:27.83

== See also ==
- Horse racing in Great Britain
- List of British flat horse races
