= Chesham Stakes =

British Thoroughbred horse race

- Class: Listed
- Location: Ascot Racecourse; Ascot, England
- Race type: Flat / Thoroughbred
- Website: Ascot

Race information
- Distance: 7f (1,408 metres)
- Surface: Turf
- Track: Straight
- Qualification: Two-year-olds sired by winner at 1 mile 2 furlongs+
- Weight: 9 st 3 lb Allowances; 5 lb for fillies Penalties; 5 lb for Group winners 3 lb for Listed winners
- Purse: £100,000 (2022); 1st: £59,200

Chesham Stakes
2026
Nola Soul	On Just Terms	Aperoll

Previous years
2025
Humidity	Thesecretadversary	Moments Of Joy
2024
Bedtime Story	Pentle Bay	Brian
2023
Snellen	Pearls And Rubies	Oddyssey
2022
Holloway Boy	Pearling Path	Lakota Sioux
2021
Point Lonsdale	Reach For The Moon	Great Max

2020-2011
2020
Battleground	March Law	Seattle Rock
2019
Pinatubo	Lope Y Fernandez	Highland Chief
2018
Arthur Kitt	Nate The Great	Duke of Hazzard
2017
September	Nyaleti	Masar
2016
Churchill	Isomer	Cunco
2015
Suits You	Ballydoyle	Sixth Sense
2014
Richard Pankhurst	Toscanini	Dick Whittington
2013
Berkshire	Bunker	Ihtimal
2012
Tha'ir	Cruck Realta	Lovely Pass
2011
Maybe	Fort Bastion	Self Centred

2010-2001
2010
Zaidan	Sonning Rose	Casper's Touch
2009
Big Audio	Emperor Claudius	Party Doctor
2008
Free Agent	Seaway	Markyg
2007
Maze	Pegasus Again	Feared in Flight
2006
Champlain	Country Song	Middleham
2005
Championship Point	Global Genius	Crocodile Bay
2004
Whazzat	Brecon Beacon	Wilko
2003
Pearl of Love	Tycoon	Milk It Mick
2002
Helm Bank	Tomahawk	Celtic Sapphire
2001
Seba	Parasol	Monarchoftheglen

2000-1991
2000
Celtic Silence	Baaridd	Leopard Spot
1999
Bach	Hastenby	Hiddnah
1998
Rhapsodist	Compton Admiral	Dashiba
1997
Central Park	Cape Verdi	Wales
1996
Shamikh	State Fair	Belgravia
1995
World Premier	Paloma Bay	Bahamian Knight
1994
Montjoy	Helmsman	Chilly Billy
1993
State Performer	Time Star	Governor George
1992
Humam	Lord President	Nuryandra
1991
Fair Cop	Governor's Imp	Bradawn Breever

1990-1982
1990
Chicarica	Dominion Gold	Prodigal Blues
1989
Be My Chief	Osario	Endless Joy
1988
Jacamar	Spitfire	Ambuscade
1987
Lapierre	Quiet Week-End	Tribal Rite
1986
Minstrella	Chime Time	Luzum
1985
Bakharoff	Akaaleel	Moorgate Man
1982
Right Dancer	The Noble Player	Santella King

The Chesham Stakes is a Listed flat horse race in Great Britain open to two-year-old horses. It is run at Ascot over a distance of 7 furlongs (1,408 metres), and it is scheduled to take place each year in June.

== History ==
The event is named after the 3rd Baron Chesham, who served as the last Master of the Buckhounds in 1900–01. It was established in 1919, and it was originally contested over 5 furlongs. It replaced a previous race, the first leg of the Triennial Stakes. The race has an unusual restriction, being open only to horses sired by stallions who won over ten furlongs or more.

For a period the Chesham Stakes was contested over 6 furlongs, and it was extended to 7 furlongs in 1996. It is currently restricted to horses whose sires or dams have won at a distance in excess of 1 mile and 1½ furlongs, or in excess of 1,900 metres.

The Chesham Stakes is now the opening race on the final day of the Royal Ascot meeting.

Lester Piggott rode seven winners of the race between 1960 and 1982.

== Records ==
Leading jockey (7 wins):

- Lester Piggott - New Move (1960), Swift Harmony (1965), Ribofilio (1968), Meadow Mint (1971), Star Way (1979), Cajun (1981), Right Dancer (1982)

(6 wins):

- Ryan Moore - Maybe (2011), Churchill (2016), September (2017), Battleground (2020), Point Lonsdale (2021), Bedtime Story (2024)

Leading trainer (7 wins):

- Aidan O'Brien – Bach (1999), Maybe (2011), Churchill (2016), September (2017), Battleground (2020), Point Lonsdale (2021), Bedtime Story (2024)

== Winners ==
Year	Winner	Jockey	Trainer	Time
1919	Decagone colt	Bernard Carslake	Atty Persse
1920	Syrian Prince	George Hulme	Len Cundell
1921	Torlinda	Herbert Robbins	George Dundas	1:03.40
1922	Pharos	Ted Gardner	George Lambton	1:02.60
1923	Parmenio	Charlie Elliott	Jack Jarvis	1:02.60
1924	Poor Scats	Bobby Jones	Harry Cottrill
1925	Accurate colt	Harry Beasley Jnr.	Atty Persse
1926	Satrap	Harry Beasley Jnr.	Atty Persse	1:06.00
1927	Pondicherry	Joseph Thwaites	Fred C Archer	1:02.20
1928	Costaki Pasha	Michael Beary	Richard Dawson	1:04.20
1929 (dh)	Rustom Pasha; Silvia	Michael Beary; Bobby Jones	Richard Dawson; Joseph Lawson	1:04.20
1930	Goyescas	Charlie Elliott	Basil Jarvis	1:03.80
1931	Golden Hair colt	Bobby Jones	Joseph Lawson	1:05.00
1932	Mannering	Arthur Wragg	Victor Gilpin	1:02.60
1933	Merenda	Sir Gordon Richards	Fred Darling	1:02.80
1934	Shahali	Richard Perryman	Frank Butters	1:03.40
1935	Pike Barn	Tommy Lowrey	Basil Jarvis	1:05.20
1936	Fair Copy	Richard Perryman	Colledge Leader	1:03.20
1937	Tahir	Charlie Smirke	Frank Butters	1:04.40
1938	Dhoti	Charlie Smirke	Frank Butters	1:03.20
1939	Rose Of England colt	Tommy Lowrey	Basil Jarvis	1:03.80
1940–45	No Race
1946	Wet Bob	Billy Nevett	Matthew Peacock	1:06.00
1947	Djerid	Charlie Elliott	Charles Semblat	1:03.40
1948	Abernant	Charlie Smirke	Noel Murless	1:04.60
1949	No Race
1950	Bakshishi	Charlie Smirke	Harry Wragg	1:05.00
1951	Chivalry	Doug Smith	Reg Day	1:03.60
1952	Nigrette	Ted Fordyce	George Beeby	1:04.00
1953	High Treason	Eph Smith	Ted Leader	1:04.60
1954	Eubulides	Edgar Britt	Charles Elsey	1:04.80
1955	Palariva	Roger Poincelet	Alec Head	1:02.82
1956	Dentivate	Harry Carr	Walter Nightingall	1:03.76
1957	Major Portion	Eph Smith	Ted Leader	1:02.10
1958	Tudor Melody	Eddie Hide	Richard Peacock	1:03.44
1959	Newbus	Edgar Britt	Charles Elsey	1:02.70
1960	New Move	Lester Piggott	Peter Walwyn	1:04.58
1961	Kathyanga	Ron Hutchinson	Paddy Prendergast	1:04.54
1962	Narrow Escape	Joe Mercer	Dick Hern	1:04.55
1963	Mesopotamia	Peter Boothman	Brud Fetherstonhaugh	1:20.98
1964	Abandoned due to waterlogging
1965	Swift Harmony	Lester Piggott	Eddie Reavey	1:19.79
1966	Hambleden	Scobie Breasley	Atty Corbett	1:19.06
1967	Riboccare	Jimmy Lindley	Jeremy Tree	1:18.60
1968	Ribofilio	Lester Piggott	Fulke Johnson Houghton	1:17.71
1969	Malvasia	Russ Maddock	Ted Leader	1:18.80
1970	Trinity Term	Eddie Hide	Peter Nelson	1:18.30
1971	Meadow Mint	Lester Piggott	Sam Armstrong	1:22.50
1972	Otha	Willie Carson	Bernard van Cutsem	1:19.21
1973	Live Arrow	Tommy Carter	Bill Marshall	1:20.51
1974	Red Cross	Pat Eddery	Peter Walwyn	1:16.50
1975	Smuggler	Joe Mercer	Dick Hern	1:16.69
1976	Limone	Greville Starkey	Guy Harwood	1:17.35
1977	Sookera	Walter Swinburn	Dermot Weld	1:18.45
1978	Main Reef	Joe Mercer	Henry Cecil	1:17.16
1979	Star Way	Lester Piggott	Paul Kelleway	1:18.00
1980	Kirtling	Pat Eddery	Harry Wragg	1:18.29
1981	Cajun	Lester Piggott	Henry Cecil	1:16.75
1982	Right Dancer	Lester Piggott	Paul Kelleway	1:14.84
1983	Head For Heights	Greville Starkey	Richard Hannon Sr.	1:15.42
1984	Old Bailey	Greville Starkey	Guy Harwood	1:14.96
1985	Bakharoff	Greville Starkey	Guy Harwood	1:15.31
1986	Minstrella	John Reid	Charlie Nelson	1:13.63
1987	Lapierre	Steve Cauthen	Clive Brittain	1:19.29
1988	Jacamar	Bruce Raymond	Ben Hanbury	1:14.21
1989	Be My Chief	Steve Cauthen	Henry Cecil	1:15.21
1990	Chicarica	Pat Eddery	John Gosden	1:16.72
1991	Fair Cop	Alan Munro	Paul Cole	1:14.80
1992	Humam	Richard Hills	Harry Thomson Jones	1:14.26
1993	State Performer	John Reid	Peter Chapple-Hyam	1:20.34
1994	Montjoy	Richard Quinn	Paul Cole	1:15.14
1995	World Premier	Brett Doyle	Clive Brittain	1:14.97
1996	Shamikh	Richard Hills	Saeed bin Suroor	1:30.57
1997	Central Park	Frankie Dettori	Paul Cole	1:29.84
1998	Rhapsodist	Frankie Dettori	John Gosden	1:32.84
1999	Bach	Michael Kinane	Aidan O'Brien	1:28.88
2000	Celtic Silence	Kieren Fallon	Mark Johnston	1:30.59
2001	Seba	Frankie Dettori	David Loder	1:29.64
2002	Helm Bank	Keith Dalgleish	Mark Johnston	1:29.00
2003	Pearl of Love	Darryll Holland	Mark Johnston	1:28.50
2004	Whazzat	Michael Hills	Barry Hills	1:29.55
2005 (Note: The 2005 running took place at York)	Championship Point	Ted Durcan	Mick Channon	1:24.14
2006	Champlain	Philip Robinson	Michael Jarvis	1:27.90
2007	Maze	Royston Ffrench	Bryan Smart	1:29.28
2008	Free Agent	Richard Hughes	Richard Hannon Sr.	1:29.59
2009	Big Audio	Richard Hughes	Richard Hannon Sr.	1:30.19
2010	Zaidan	Seb Sanders	Clive Brittain	1:27.51
2011	Maybe	Ryan Moore	Aidan O'Brien	1:32.46
2012	Tha'ir	Frankie Dettori	Saeed bin Suroor	1:30.01
2013	Berkshire	Jim Crowley	Paul Cole	1:28:46
2014	Richard Pankhurst	William Buick	John Gosden	1:27:58
2015	Suits You (Note: The 2015 winner Suits You was later exported to Hong Kong and renamed Sunny Way)	Cristian Demuro	Eoghan O'Neill	1:26.93
2016	Churchill	Ryan Moore	Aidan O'Brien	1:29.57
2017	September	Ryan Moore	Aidan O'Brien	1:26.70
2018	Arthur Kitt	Richard Kingscote	Tom Dascombe	1:28.08
2019	Pinatubo	James Doyle	Charlie Appleby	1:25.73
2020	Battleground	Ryan Moore	Aidan O'Brien	1:30.62
2021	Point Lonsdale	Ryan Moore	Aidan O'Brien	1:30.46
2022	Holloway Boy	Daniel Tudhope	Karl Burke	1:28.12
2023	Snellen	Gary Carroll	Gavin Cromwell	1:29.36
2024	Bedtime Story	Ryan Moore	Aidan O'Brien	1:27.01
2025	Humidity	James Doyle	Andrew Balding	1:27.09
2026	Nola Soul	Seamie Heffernan	Fozzy Stack	1:26.85

== See also ==
- Horse racing in Great Britain
- List of British flat horse races
