= Chamossaire (horse) =

Irish-bred Thoroughbred racehorse

- Bronze statue of Chamossaire at the Snailwell Stud
- Sire: Precipitation
- Grandsire: Hurry On
- Dam: Snowberry
- Damsire: Cameronian
- Sex: Stallion
- Foaled: 1942
- Country: Ireland
- Colour: Chestnut
- Breeder: National Stud
- Owner: Stanhope Joel
- Trainer: Richard Perryman
- Record: 11:4-3-0

Major wins
- Cavenham Stakes (1945); St Leger Stakes (1945)

Awards
- Leading sire in Great Britain and Ireland (1964)

Chamossaire (1942–1964) was an Irish Thoroughbred racehorse and sire best known for winning the classic St Leger Stakes in 1945 and siring the Derby winner Santa Claus. After winning twice as a two-year-old, Chamossaire contested all three legs of the Triple Crown in 1945. He finished fourth in both the 2000 Guineas and the Derby before winning the St Leger. He was retired to stud where he proved to be a successful sire of winners. Chamossaire died in 1964.

== Background ==
Chamossaire's sire Precipitation was a top class racehorse, best known for winning the Ascot Gold Cup in 1937. He went on to become a successful stallion, siring three other Classic winners in Airborne (Derby), Premonition (St Leger) and Why Hurry (Epsom Oaks), as well as the King George VI and Queen Elizabeth Stakes winner Supreme Court. Precipitation himself was sired by the unbeaten champion, Hurry On, making him a representative of the Godolphin Arabian sire line. Chamossaire's dam, Snowberry, was a very fast filly who won the Queen Mary Stakes at Royal Ascot. She was a daughter of Myrobella, the leading British two-year-old of 1932, making her a sister of the 2000 Guineas winner Big Game. Snowberry went on to produce Ariana, the grand-dam of The Derby winner Snow Knight. With a combination of stamina from his sire and speed from his dam, Chamossaire was regarded as having an excellent classic pedigree.

As a yearling, the colt was sold for 2,700 guineas to Walter Earl, acting on behalf of Stanhope Joel, a member of the influential Joel family. Chamossaire, named after a mountain in Switzerland was sent into training with Richard "Dick" Perryman at his Beaufort House stable in Newmarket.

Restrictions imposed during the Second World War meant that many British racecourses, including Epsom, Doncaster and Ascot were closed and many races were either abandoned or run away from their traditional venues.

== Racing career ==
=== 1944: two-year-old season ===
Racing exclusively at Newmarket Racecourse, Chamossaire won two of his three races. In the Free Handicap, a rating of the season's best two-year-olds, he was given a weight of 126 pounds, seven pounds below the top-rated Dante.

=== 1945: three-year-old season ===
On his first appearance as a three-year-old, Chamossaire finished third behind High Peak and Royal Charger in the Chatteris Stakes in May. He was nevertheless moved up in class to contest the 2000 Guineas, which was run that year over the July Course. In an exceptionally strong renewal of the race he finished fourth of the twenty runners behind Court Martial, Dante and Royal Charger. Chamossaire was closing on the leaders in the final strides, leading to his being strongly fancied for the Derby a month later.

In June Chamossaire returned to the July Course for the "Derby Stakes", a substitute race for the Derby. In a field of twenty-seven runners he again finished fourth, beaten two lengths, a head and a neck by Dante, Midas and Court Martial. He continued to campaign at Newmarket in the summer of 1945, finishing second to Stirling Castle when strongly fancied for the Princess of Wales's Stakes and then recording a narrow victory in the Cavenham Stakes over one and a half miles.

Despite the end of the War, Doncaster racecourse was not ready to stage a classic in the autumn of 1945 and the St Leger was run over fourteen furlongs at York Racecourse. Prize-money, however, returned to pre-war levels and with £10,210 to the winner, the race was the most valuable run in Britain that year. Ridden by Tommy Lowrey, Chamossaire started at odds of 11/2 in a field of twelve runners with the Aga Khan's filly Naishapur starting 5/2 favourite. The race attracted a crowd estimated at 150,000 causing serious congestion on the roads leading to the racecourse: many spectators abandoned their cars and walked the final miles to the course. Stirling Castle took the lead after half a mile and led the field into the straight. Chamossaire took the lead a furlong from the finish and held off the late challenge of King George VI's colt Rising Light to win by two lengths, with Stirling Castle in third place. For his two remaining starts, Chamossaire returned to Newmarket and raced in all-aged competition. He finished second to Black Peter in the Jockey Club Stakes over fourteen furlongs and second by a neck to the filly Amber Flash in the two-mile Jockey Club Cup.

Chamossaire remained in training as a four-year-old with the Ascot Gold Cup as his main objective, but he never ran again.

== Assessment and honours ==
In their book, A Century of Champions, based on the Timeform rating system, John Randall and Tony Morris rated Chamoissaire an "average" winner of the St Leger.

== Stud record ==
For most of his stud career, Chamossaire was a useful, but inconsistent stallion, based at the Snailwell Stud near Newmarket. His best winners included Le Sage (Sussex Stakes), Chamier (Irish Derby), Cambremer (St Leger, Prix du Cadran) and Your Highness (Irish Derby). In 1961 he sired Santa Claus whose wins included the Irish 2,000 Guineas, Epsom Derby and Irish Derby. The successes of Santa Claus earned Chamossaire the posthumous title of Leading sire in Great Britain and Ireland in 1964.

== Sire line tree ==
- Chamossaire
  - Le Sage
  - Chamier
  - Cambremer
  - Your Highness
  - Santa Claus
    - Reindeer

== Pedigree ==
Pedigree of Chamossaire (GB), chestnut stallion, 1942
Sire Precipitation (GB) 1933	Hurry On (GB); 1913	Marcovil	Marco
Sire Precipitation (GB) 1933	Hurry On (GB); 1913	Marcovil	Lady Villikins
Sire Precipitation (GB) 1933	Hurry On (GB); 1913	Toute Suite	Sainfoin
Sire Precipitation (GB) 1933	Hurry On (GB); 1913	Toute Suite	Star
Sire Precipitation (GB) 1933	Double Life (GB); 1926	Bachelor's Double	Tredennis
Sire Precipitation (GB) 1933	Double Life (GB); 1926	Bachelor's Double	Lady Bawn
Sire Precipitation (GB) 1933	Double Life (GB); 1926	Saint Joan	Willbrook
Sire Precipitation (GB) 1933	Double Life (GB); 1926	Saint Joan	Flo Desmond
Dam Snowberry (GB) 1937	Cameronian (GB); 1928	Pharos	Phalaris
Dam Snowberry (GB) 1937	Cameronian (GB); 1928	Pharos	Scapa Flow
Dam Snowberry (GB) 1937	Cameronian (GB); 1928	Una Cameron	Gainsborough
Dam Snowberry (GB) 1937	Cameronian (GB); 1928	Una Cameron	Cherimoya
Dam Snowberry (GB) 1937	Myrobella (IRE); 1930	Tetratema	The Tetrarch
Dam Snowberry (GB) 1937	Myrobella (IRE); 1930	Tetratema	Scotch Gift
Dam Snowberry (GB) 1937	Myrobella (IRE); 1930	Dolabella	White Eagle
Dam Snowberry (GB) 1937	Myrobella (IRE); 1930	Dolabella	Gondolette (Family: 6-e)
