= Airborne (horse) =

Irish-bred Thoroughbred racehorse

- circa 1947
- Sire: Precipitation
- Grandsire: Hurry On
- Dam: Bouquet
- Damsire: Buchan
- Sex: Stallion
- Foaled: 1943
- Country: United Kingdom
- Colour: Grey
- Breeder: Harold Boyd-Rochfort
- Owner: John Ferguson
- Trainer: Richard Perryman
- Record: 11: 4½-0-2
- Earnings: £20,345¾

Major wins
- Epsom Derby (1946); Princess of Wales's Stakes (1946); St Leger (1946)
- Last updated on 13 November 2011

Airborne (1943 – 11 September 1962) was an Irish-bred British-trained Thoroughbred racehorse and sire. After showing little worthwhile form as a two-year-old, Airborne improved to become one of the leading three-year-olds in Britain in 1946. He won five successive races including two Classics: the Derby at Epsom and the St Leger at Doncaster. He was the most recent of four greys to have won the Epsom Classic. Airborne went on to have a stud career of limited success.

== Background ==
Airborne was a tall, rangy grey horse bred at Castletown Geoghegan, County Westmeath, in Ireland by Harold Boyd-Rochfort, the brother of the successful trainer Cecil Boyd-Rochfort. As a yearling he was sent to the sales where he was bought for 3,900 guineas by the British plastics manufacturer and racehorse-breeder John Ferguson. Ferguson sent the colt to be trained by the former jockey Richard “Dick” Perryman at his Beaufort House stables at Newmarket, Suffolk.

Airborne’s sire Precipitation was a top-class racehorse, best known for winning the Ascot Gold Cup in 1937. He went on to become a successful stallion, siring three other Classic winners in Why Hurry (Epsom Oaks), Premonition (St Leger) and Chamossaire (St Leger). Precipitation himself was sired by the unbeaten champion, Hurry On, making him a representative of the Godolphin Arabian sire line. Airborne’s dam, Bouquet, from whom he inherited his grey colour, never ran in a race, but produced nine winners, the best of them, apart from Airborne, being a sprinter named Fragrant View.

== Racing career ==
=== 1945: two-year-old season ===
As a two-year-old, Airborne was extremely immature and failed to win in four starts, giving little indication of Classic potential, although he did finish fourth to the future 1000 Guineas winner Hypericum in the Dewhurst Stakes.

=== 1946: three-year-old season ===
In Airborne’s three-year-old debut, he finished third in a moderate race at Newmarket in April. Two weeks later, he returned to Newmarket and won a maiden race over one and a half miles.

The Derby of 1946 was the first to be run at Epsom since 1939, the course having been used as an anti-aircraft battery position during the war, and the race attracted a huge crowd, estimated at up to 500,000, including the King and Queen. Airborne, ridden by Tommy Lowrey, was an unconsidered outsider, starting at odds of 50/1 in a field of seventeen in a race run on soft ground. In the early stages, Airborne was held up and was still well back turning into the straight. Gulf Stream took the lead in the last quarter mile as Lowrey pulled Airborne wide to produce a sustained run down the centre of the course. He caught Gulf Stream inside the final furlong and won by a length.

Airborne reappeared in the Princess of Wales's Stakes at Newmarket in July where he took on older horses. He won his third successive race by beating the five-year-old Hardwicke Stakes winner Priam II. The following month, he ran at Newmarket for the fourth time that season and dead-heated with Fast and Fair in the Stuntney Stakes. At Doncaster in September, he started 3/1 favourite for the St Leger, which was run before another huge crowd. He tracked the leaders before being sent to the front in the straight and winning "in magnificent style" by one and a half lengths from Murren, with Fast and Fair third. It was a second win in the race for Perryman and Lowrey, who had been successful with Chamoissaire the previous year. On his final start of the season, Airborne was matched against the Grand Prix de Paris winner Souverain in the King George VI Stakes over two miles at Newmarket in October. Airborne started 4/5 favourite for a race which was publicised as an "international championship" for three-year-olds but finished third to the French colt, with the Irish Derby winner Bright News taking second.

Attempts to train Airborne as a four-year-old, with the Ascot Gold Cup as his target, ended in failure, and he was retired to stud without racing again.

== Assessment ==
In their book A Century of Champions, John Randall and Tony Morris rated Airborne an “inferior” Derby winner.

== Stud career ==
Airborne was not a success as a stallion. The best of his runners on the flat was the filly Silken Glider, who finished second in the Oaks and won the Irish Oaks in 1957. The best horse he sired was the Irish-trained jumper Flyingbolt. Airborne's progeny had won approximately £25,000 in stakes up until the end of 1955. His last recorded foals were conceived in 1961. He died on 11 September 1962 of heart failure.

== Pedigree ==
Pedigree of Airborne (IRE), grey stallion, 1943
Sire Precipitation(GB) Ch. 1933	Hurry On; 1913	Marcovil	Marco
Sire Precipitation(GB) Ch. 1933	Hurry On; 1913	Marcovil	Lady Villikins
Sire Precipitation(GB) Ch. 1933	Hurry On; 1913	Toute Suite	Sainfoin
Sire Precipitation(GB) Ch. 1933	Hurry On; 1913	Toute Suite	Star
Sire Precipitation(GB) Ch. 1933	Double Life; 1926	Bachelor's Double	Tredennis
Sire Precipitation(GB) Ch. 1933	Double Life; 1926	Bachelor's Double	Lady Bawn
Sire Precipitation(GB) Ch. 1933	Double Life; 1926	Saint Joan	Willbrook
Sire Precipitation(GB) Ch. 1933	Double Life; 1926	Saint Joan	Flo Desmond
Dam Bouquet (GB) Gr. 1932	Buchan; B. 1916	Sunstar	Sundridge
Dam Bouquet (GB) Gr. 1932	Buchan; B. 1916	Sunstar	Doris
Dam Bouquet (GB) Gr. 1932	Buchan; B. 1916	Hamoaze	Torpoint
Dam Bouquet (GB) Gr. 1932	Buchan; B. 1916	Hamoaze	Maid of the Mist
Dam Bouquet (GB) Gr. 1932	Hellespont; Gr. 1921	Gay Crusader	Bayardo
Dam Bouquet (GB) Gr. 1932	Hellespont; Gr. 1921	Gay Crusader	Gay Laura
Dam Bouquet (GB) Gr. 1932	Hellespont; Gr. 1921	Barrier	Grey Leg
Dam Bouquet (GB) Gr. 1932	Hellespont; Gr. 1921	Barrier	Bar the Way (Family: 10c)
