= Santa Claus (horse) =

British-bred Thoroughbred racehorse

- Racing silks of John Ismay
- Sire: Chamossaire
- Grandsire: Precipitation
- Dam: Aunt Clara
- Damsire: Arctic Prince
- Sex: Stallion
- Foaled: 1961
- Country: United Kingdom
- Colour: Bay
- Breeder: Dr F Smorfitt
- Owner: John Ismay
- Trainer: Mick Rogers
- Record: 7: 4-2-0
- Earnings: £153,646

Major wins
- National Stakes (1963); Irish 2,000 Guineas (1964); Epsom Derby (1964); Irish Derby (1964)
- Last updated on January 24, 2007

Santa Claus (1961–1970) was a British-bred, Irish-trained Thoroughbred racehorse and sire. He is most notable for his achievements as a three-year-old in 1964 when he won the Irish 2,000 Guineas, The Derby, and the Irish Derby. His performances earned him the title of British Horse of the Year.

== Background ==
Santa Claus was a dark-coated bay stallion standing a little over 16.1 hands high, bred in Warwickshire by Dr F Smorfitt. He was sired by the St Leger winner Chamoissaire out of Aunt Clara, a mare who failed to win in her three racecourse appearances.

Santa Claus was first sent to the sales as a weanling in December 1961 at Newmarket, where he was sold for 800 guineas. A year later he was returned to the sales and was bought for 1,200 guineas by the Irish division of the British Bloodstock Agency acting on behalf of John Ismay and Mrs Darby Rogers. The colt was sent into training with Mrs Rogers' son, Mick Rogers, at the Curragh.

== Racing career ==
=== 1963: two-year-old season ===
Santa Claus made little impression on his debut, finishing unplaced in the six furlong Anglesey Stakes at the Curragh in August. A month later however, he ran in Ireland's most prestigious two-year-old race, the National Stakes, also at the Curragh. He won by eight lengths, establishing himself as a leading contender for the following year's Irish and British Classics.

=== 1964: three-year-old season ===
In 1964, Santa Claus won the Irish 2,000 Guineas. He started as even-money favourite and won by three lengths. At Epsom, he started favourite at odds of 15/8 for the Derby, in which he was ridden by the fifty-year-old Australian jockey Scobie Breasley. Santa Claus was reported to have arrived at the course under tight security as there were fears of a plot to interfere with the heavily backed colt to prevent him from winning. A crowd estimated at over 200,000, including the Queen and other members of the British royal family, was in attendance to view the most valuable race ever run in Britain. Breasley held the colt up in the early stages before producing him with a run down the centre of the course in the straight. Santa Claus took the lead inside the final furlong and won by a length from the future St Leger winner Indiana. After the race, Breasley called the colt "a dream to ride, a beaut."

A month later, Santa Claus started 4/7 favourite for the Irish Derby at the Curragh and won by four lengths from Lionhearted. At Ascot, he was the shortest-priced favourite in the history of the King George VI and Queen Elizabeth Stakes, starting at odds of 2/13 against three opponents. In one of British racing's biggest upsets he failed to catch the front-running French colt Nasram and was beaten two lengths, having been unsuited by the unusually firm ground.

More firm ground in the autumn led to Santa Claus missing the St Leger and going straight for the Prix de l'Arc de Triomphe at Longchamp in October. He finished second of the twenty-two runners, beaten three quarters of a length by the outsider Prince Royal.

== Assessment and achievements ==
Santa Claus was named British Horse of the Year by the Bloodstock Breeders' Review, gaining 10 of the 20 votes. His highest Timeform rating was 133+ Santa Claus's second place in the Arc took his total earnings to £153,646, enabling him to overtake Ballymoss as the biggest prize-money winner in the history of British and Irish racing. He held the record until his total was surpassed by Ribocco in 1967.

In their book A Century of Champions, John Randall and Tony Morris rated Santa Claus as an “average” Derby winner and the fifteenth-best Irish racehorse of the 20th century.

== Stud career ==
Santa Claus was retired in 1965 to stand at stud in Ireland after being sold at the end of his racing career for £400,000. He had some success as a stallion but had little opportunity to distinguish himself as he died of thrombosis in 1970. His best offspring included the Irish Classic winners Reindeer (Irish St. Leger) and Santa Tina (Irish Oaks).

== Pedigree ==
Pedigree of Santa Claus (GB), bay stallion, 1961
| Sire Chamossaire (GB) 1942 | Precipitation (GB); 1933 | Hurry On | Marcovil |
| Sire Chamossaire (GB) 1942 | Precipitation (GB); 1933 | Hurry On | Toute Suite |
| Sire Chamossaire (GB) 1942 | Precipitation (GB); 1933 | Double Life | Bachelors Double |
| Sire Chamossaire (GB) 1942 | Precipitation (GB); 1933 | Double Life | Saint Joan |
| Sire Chamossaire (GB) 1942 | Snowberry; 1937 | Cameronian | Pharos |
| Sire Chamossaire (GB) 1942 | Snowberry; 1937 | Cameronian | Una Cameron |
| Sire Chamossaire (GB) 1942 | Snowberry; 1937 | Myrobella | Tetratema |
| Sire Chamossaire (GB) 1942 | Snowberry; 1937 | Myrobella | Dolabella |
| Dam Aunt Clara (GB) 1953 | Arctic Prince; 1948 | Prince Chevalier | Prince Rose |
| Dam Aunt Clara (GB) 1953 | Arctic Prince; 1948 | Prince Chevalier | Chevalerie |
| Dam Aunt Clara (GB) 1953 | Arctic Prince; 1948 | Arctic Sun | Nearco |
| Dam Aunt Clara (GB) 1953 | Arctic Prince; 1948 | Arctic Sun | Solar Flower |
| Dam Aunt Clara (GB) 1953 | Sister Clara; 1938 | Scarlet Tiger | Colorado |
| Dam Aunt Clara (GB) 1953 | Sister Clara; 1938 | Scarlet Tiger | Trilogy |
| Dam Aunt Clara (GB) 1953 | Sister Clara; 1938 | Clarence | Diligence |
| Dam Aunt Clara (GB) 1953 | Sister Clara; 1938 | Clarence | Nuns Veil (Family: 3-o) |
