= Call Boy (horse) =

British-bred Thoroughbred racehorse

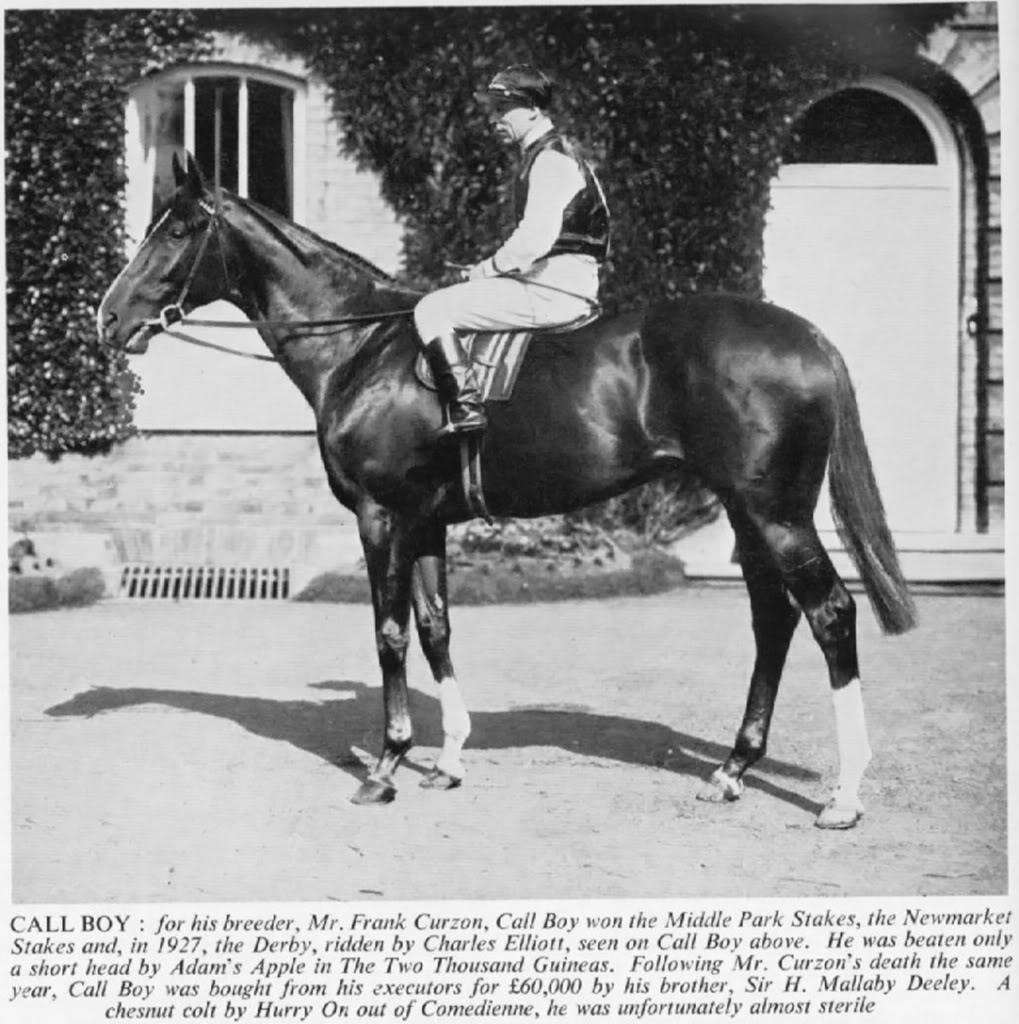
- Call Boy
- Sire: Hurry On
- Grandsire: Marcovil
- Dam: Comedienne
- Damsire: Bachelors Double
- Sex: Stallion
- Foaled: 1924
- Country: United Kingdom of Great Britain and Ireland
- Colour: Chestnut
- Breeder: Frank Curzon
- Owner: Frank Curzon
- Trainer: Jack Watts
- Record: 7: 4-2-1
- Earnings: £

Major wins
- Middle Park Stakes (1926); Newmarket Stakes (1927); Epsom Derby (1927)

Call Boy (1924–1939) was a British Thoroughbred racehorse. In a career which lasted from July 1926 to June 1927, he ran seven times winning four races. His most notable success came in the 1927 Epsom Derby, which he won in record time. Partly because of the death of his owner, Call Boy never ran again after his win at Epsom.

== Background ==
Call Boy, a chestnut horse with a white blaze and two white socks, was bred by his owner, the actor and theatre manager Frank Curzon at his Primrose Cottage Stud. He was sired by the unbeaten champion, Hurry On, making him a representative of the Godolphin Arabian sire line. Apart from Call Boy, Hurry On sired the winners of seven Classics including the Derby winners Captain Cuttle and Coronach. Call Boy's dam, Comedienne, a daughter of the Irish Derby winner Bachelor's Double, had been bought by Curzon for 130gns. In addition to Call Boy, she produced the Great Yorkshire Stakes winner Comedy King.

Curzon sent Call Boy to be trained by Jack Watts at his Lansdowne House Stable at Newmarket, Suffolk.

== Racing career ==
=== 1926: two-year-old season ===
Call Boy made his racecourse debut in the prestigious July Stakes at Newmarket in which he finished third to The Satrap and Sickle. In the Champagne Stakes at Doncaster he produced a strong finish to reverse the form with Sickle but narrowly failed to catch Damon. At Newmarket in October he recorded his first win in the Linton Stakes and then returned to the same course later in the month for the Middle Park Stakes, one of the most important two-year-old races of the season. Call Boy established himself as one of the year's leading juveniles by winning by a head from Sickle. In the Free Handicap, an annual rating of the best British two-year-olds, Call Boy was ranked fifth.

=== 1927: three-year-old season ===
Frank Curzon, Call Boy's owner and breeder c. 1900

On his three-year-old debut Call Boy started favourite for the 2000 Guineas at Newmarket, despite the fact that he was "evidently backward in condition", but was beaten a short head by Adam's Apple. In the days before the photo finish was introduced results were decided solely by the judge, and on this occasion there were some who felt that Call Boy had been unlucky not to have been given at least a share of the prize. On his next start, Call Boy was an impressive four length winner of the Newmarket Stakes, over ten furlongs. Although the opposition was moderate, his performance suggested that he would be well suited by longer distances.

At Epsom, Call Boy started the 4/1 favourite, despite a slight injury scare, and was ridden by Charlie Elliott. The race took place on a wet and "dismal" day in front of a crowd which included the King and Queen as well as the aviator Charles Lindbergh. Call Boy led from the start but was strongly challenged in the straight by Hot Night. After being briefly headed inside the final furlong, Call Boy rallied to retake the lead and pulled away to win by two lengths from Hot Night, with the pair eight lengths clear of the third-placed Shian Mor. His winning time of 2:34.4 broke the race record set five years earlier by Captain Cuttle. Curzon who attended the race against doctor's advice, was obviously unwell ("pale and trembling"), but managed to lead the colt in and accepted the winner's trophy.

Frank Curzon died shortly after the Derby. Under the rules of racing at the time, this meant that all of his entries for the rest of the season were void. Call Boy was bought by Curzon's brother, Sir Henry Mallaby-Deeley for £60,000, but no new entries were made and Call Boy was retired to stud.

.

== Assessment ==
In their book A Century of Champions, John Randall and Tony Morris rated Call Boy an "average" Derby winner and the one hundred and fifty-second best British racehorse of the 20th century .

== Stud career ==
Call Boy's stud career was a complete failure. He had serious fertility problems and sired only a handful of foals, none of whom showed any real ability. In 1932, for example, he managed to get only four mares "in foal". His only notable descendant was the 1000 Guineas and Oaks winner Sweet Solera. Call Boy died on 4 October 1939.

== Pedigree ==
Pedigree of Call Boy (GB), chestnut stallion, 1924
| Sire Hurry On (GB) 1913 | Marcovil; 1903 | Marco | Barcaldine |
| Sire Hurry On (GB) 1913 | Marcovil; 1903 | Marco | Novitiate |
| Sire Hurry On (GB) 1913 | Marcovil; 1903 | Lady Villikins | Hagioscope |
| Sire Hurry On (GB) 1913 | Marcovil; 1903 | Lady Villikins | Dinah |
| Sire Hurry On (GB) 1913 | Toute Suite; 1904 | Sainfoin | Springfield |
| Sire Hurry On (GB) 1913 | Toute Suite; 1904 | Sainfoin | Sanda |
| Sire Hurry On (GB) 1913 | Toute Suite; 1904 | Star | Thurio |
| Sire Hurry On (GB) 1913 | Toute Suite; 1904 | Star | Meteor |
| Dam Comedienne (GB) 1913 | Bachelor's Double; 1906 | Tredennis | Kendal |
| Dam Comedienne (GB) 1913 | Bachelor's Double; 1906 | Tredennis | St Marguerite |
| Dam Comedienne (GB) 1913 | Bachelor's Double; 1906 | Lady Bawn | Le Noir |
| Dam Comedienne (GB) 1913 | Bachelor's Double; 1906 | Lady Bawn | Milady |
| Dam Comedienne (GB) 1913 | Altoviscar; 1902 | Donovan | Galopin |
| Dam Comedienne (GB) 1913 | Altoviscar; 1902 | Donovan | Mowerina |
| Dam Comedienne (GB) 1913 | Altoviscar; 1902 | Navaretta | Kilwarlin |
| Dam Comedienne (GB) 1913 | Altoviscar; 1902 | Navaretta | Pampeluna (Family: 2-f) |
