= Count Pahlen (horse) =

British-bred Thoroughbred racehorse

- Sire: Hotfoot
- Grandsire: Firestreak
- Dam: Tanara
- Damsire: Romulus
- Sex: Stallion
- Foaled: 12 February 1979
- Country: United Kingdom
- Colour: Grey
- Breeder: Tony Villar
- Owner: Mrs Tony Villar; Dogwood Stable
- Trainer: Bruce Hobbs; William Curtis, Jr.
- Record: 32: 4-1-4

Major wins
- William Hill Futurity (1981); Blue Riband Trial Stakes (1982)

Awards
- Timeform rating 127 (1981), 115 (1982)

Count Pahlen (12 February 1979 – after 1987) was a British Thoroughbred racehorse and sire. At two-years old in 1981, he was one of the best colts of his generation in Europe, winning two of his five races including a victory over a strong field in the Group One William Hill Futurity. He won the Blue Riband Trial Stakes on his three-year-old debut, but his form deteriorated thereafter. He raced in North America in 1883 and 1984 and had very little success, winning only one minor race from twenty-four attempts. He later stood as a breeding stallion in France but had no success as a sire of winners.

== Background ==
Count Pahlen was a grey horse bred in the United Kingdom by Tony Villar. He was sired by Hotfoot who won the Coronation Stakes and finished second in both the Irish 2000 Guineas and the Prince of Wales's Stakes. The best of his other progeny included Hot Grove (runner-up in The Derby) and Tachypous (Middle Park Stakes). Count Pahlen's dam Tanara showed some ability as a racehorse, winning four minor races over middle distances. She was descended from the Irish Oaks winner Snow Maiden, the female-line ancestor of several major winners including King of Kings.

Count Pahlen raced in the colours of Villar's wife and was sent into training with Bruce Hobbs at the Palace House stable in Newmarket. Hobbs had previously trained both Hotfoot and Tanara, as well as Tanara's sire Romulus. The colt was named after the Russian courtier Peter Ludwig von der Pahlen.

== Racing career ==
=== 1981: two-year-old season ===
Count Pahlen began his racing career in a seven furlong race at Great Yarmouth Racecourse in July. Looking less than fully fit he had considerable difficulty obtaining a clear run before finishing third behind Vin St Benet. When moved up in class for the Acomb Stakes at York Racecourse in August he was badly hampered in the last quarter mile and finished third to the filly Height of Fashion and the colt Ashenden, beaten two and three quarter lengths by the winner. At Newbury Racecourse in October he was one of twenty-two juveniles to contest the Haynes, Hanson and Clark Stakes over one mile. The large field split into two groups and although Count Pahlen proved the best of those racing up the far side of the course (the left hand side from the jockeys' viewpoint) he finished only fifth behind Super Sunrise and three others who raced on the stands side. The colt recorded his first success in a division of the Westley Stakes, a maiden race over seven furlongs at Newmarket Racecourse in October, winning by half a length from Noble Gift in a twenty-two runner field.

In late October Count Pahlen, ridden by Geoff Baxter, started a 25/1 outsider in a thirteen-runner field for the Group One William Hill Futurity over one mile at Doncaster Racecourse. The favourite was the Henry Cecil-trained Paradis Terrestre, a seven-length winner of his only previous start while the other runners included Norwick (Royal Lodge Stakes), End of the Line (July Stakes), Assert, Jalmood (unbeaten in three starts), Super Sunrise and Ashenden. After tracking the leaders, Count Pahlen went to the front three furlongs out, got the better of a sustained struggle and held off the late challenges of Paradis Terrestre and Jalmood to win by half a length and a head. The colt's victory gave Baxter a first Group One win.

=== 1982: three-year-old season ===
On his first appearance as a three-year-old Count Pahlen contested the Group Three Blue Riband Trial Stakes over 8 1/2 furlongs at Epsom Downs Racecourse in May and recorded his third consecutive victory, beating Steel Bay (to whom he was conceding ten pounds) by a neck. In May he ran in the Dante Stakes (a major trial race for The Derby) over 10 1/2 furlongs at York Racecourse and finished fourth behind Simply Great, Palace Gold and Be My Native. In the 203rd running of the Epsom Derby on 2 June he started a 33/1 outsider. He was briefly in contention entering the straight but faded in the closing stages and finished ninth of the eighteen runners behind Golden Fleece. Count Pahlen was unplaced in his two remaining races in Europe, ending his season by finishing seventh behind Time Charter in the Champion Stakes at Newmarket in October.

=== 1983 & 1984: later career ===
Count Pahlen was bought by Dogwood Stable and was sent to race in North America where he was trained by William Curtis, Jr. He made no impact in 1983, finishing second once and third once in eleven attempts in allowance races. He won an allowance at Fair Grounds Race Course on his first appearance of 1984, but finished no better than third in twelve subsequent races.

== Assessment ==
In the official International Classification for 1981, Count Pahlen was rated the third-best two-year-old in Europe behind Green Forest and Wind and Wuthering. The independent Timeform organisation gave the colt a rating of 127, five pounds inferior to their best two-year-old Wind and Wuthering. In their annual Racehorses of 1981 Timeform described Count Pahlen as "a strong, good sort of colt who carries plenty of condition" and likely to become a serious contender for the Epsom Derby. He was rated 115 by Timeform in 1982.

== Stud record ==
At the end of his racing career, Count Pahlen returned to Europe and stood as a breeding stallion in France. His last reported foals were born in 1988.

== Pedigree ==
Pedigree of Count Pahlen (GB), grey stallion, 1979
Sire Hotfoot (GB) 1966	Firestreak (GB); 1956	Pardal	Pharis
Sire Hotfoot (GB) 1966	Firestreak (GB); 1956	Pardal	Adargatis
Sire Hotfoot (GB) 1966	Firestreak (GB); 1956	Hot Spell	Umidwar
Sire Hotfoot (GB) 1966	Firestreak (GB); 1956	Hot Spell	Haymaker
Sire Hotfoot (GB) 1966	Pitter Patter (GB); 1953	Kingstone	King Salmon
Sire Hotfoot (GB) 1966	Pitter Patter (GB); 1953	Kingstone	Feola
Sire Hotfoot (GB) 1966	Pitter Patter (GB); 1953	Rain	Fair Trial
Sire Hotfoot (GB) 1966	Pitter Patter (GB); 1953	Rain	Monsoon
Dam Tanara (GB) 1968	Romulus (GB); 1959	Ribot	Tenerani
Dam Tanara (GB) 1968	Romulus (GB); 1959	Ribot	Romanella
Dam Tanara (GB) 1968	Romulus (GB); 1959	Arietta	Tudor Minstrel
Dam Tanara (GB) 1968	Romulus (GB); 1959	Arietta	Anne of Essex
Dam Tanara (GB) 1968	Ice Ballet (GB); 1963	Ballymoss	Mosborough
Dam Tanara (GB) 1968	Ice Ballet (GB); 1963	Ballymoss	Indian Call
Dam Tanara (GB) 1968	Ice Ballet (GB); 1963	Snow Shower	The Phoenix
Dam Tanara (GB) 1968	Ice Ballet (GB); 1963	Snow Shower	Sleet (Family: 7)
