= Supreme Court (horse) =

British-bred Thoroughbred racehorse

- Sire: Precipitation
- Grandsire: Hurry On
- Dam: Forecourt
- Damsire: Fair Trial
- Sex: Stallion
- Foaled: 1948
- Country: United Kingdom
- Colour: Brown
- Breeder: Thomas Lilley
- Owner: Vera Lilley
- Trainer: Evan Williams
- Earnings: £36,949

Major wins
- Horris Hill Stakes (1950); Chester Vase (1951); King Edward VII Stakes (1951); King George VI and Queen Elizabeth Stakes (1951)

Awards
- Timeform rating 135

Supreme Court (1948–1962) was a British Thoroughbred racehorse and sire. After winning the Horris Hill Stakes as a two-year-old, Supreme Court was undefeated in four races as a three-year-old in 1951, taking the Chester Vase and King Edward VII Stakes before beating a strong international field to win the inaugural King George VI and Queen Elizabeth Stakes. Following his win in the most valuable race ever run in Britain, Supreme Court was retired to stud, where he had some success as a sire of winners.

== Background ==
Supreme Court was a brown horse with a white star and two white feet bred in Britain by Tom Lilley. His dam, Forecourt, won one race for her owner-breeder Giles Loder and was sold for 8,100 guineas to Lilley in 1947. The mare was pregnant at the time, having been covered by two stallions, Persian Gulf and Precipitation earlier that year, and she produced a colt foal, later named Supreme Court in 1948. It was generally assumed that Precipitation, the 1937 Ascot Gold Cup winner was Supreme Court's father, although the horse was officially registered as being "by Persian Gulf or Precipitation".

As a yearling, Supreme Court was sent to the sales, but failed to reach his reserve price of 2,000 guineas. Lilley therefore gave the horse to his wife Vera as a wedding anniversary present, and Supreme Court was sent into training with Marcus Marsh at his Egerton House stables at Newmarket, Suffolk. When the Aga Khan sent a number of horses to Marsh in 1950, Supreme Court was forced to leave to make room for the new arrivals and the colt was then sent to be trained by Evan Williams at Kingsclere, in Berkshire. He was ridden in most of his races by the veteran jockey Charlie Elliott.

== Racing career ==
Racing as a two-year-old in 1950, Supreme Court won the Horris Hill Stakes over seven furlongs at Newbury Racecourse at odds of 5/2. The colt was not entered in the 1951 British Classic Races and with no supplementary entries allowed at the time, he was unable to contest the Triple Crown. In spring 1951, Supreme Court won the White Lodge Stakes at Hurst Park and then took the Chester Vase, a race which usually serves as an important trial race for the Epsom Derby. In June, Supreme Court was sent to Royal Ascot for the King Edward VII Stakes. He started the 6/4 favourite and won from Sybil's Nephew, a colt who had finished runner-up in the Derby.

July saw the running of a newly inaugurated race over one and a half miles at Ascot. The King George VI and Queen Elizabeth Festival of Britain Stakes was devised by Sir John Crocker Bulteel as a race which would bring together the best three-year-olds and the best older horses, and carried prize money of over £25,000, making it the most valuable race ever run in Britain. The race, was, to some extent, a British imitation of the Prix de l'Arc de Triomphe, which, since a large increase in prize money in 1949, had been the most valuable all-aged race in Europe. The event attracted a strong field of nineteen including the Derby winner Arctic Prince and the previous season's Arc winner Tantieme, as well as the winners of the most recent runnings of the 1000 Guineas, 2000 Guineas and St Leger. Elliott restrained Supreme Court, a 100/9 chance, towards the rear of the field as a strong pace was set by Mossborough. As the leaders tired in the straight, Supreme Court challenged on the outside, together with Zucchero, ridden by Lester Piggott. The two British-trained three-year-olds drew clear of the field inside the final furlong, with Supreme Court prevailing by three quarters of a length. Tantieme was six lengths further back in third, just ahead of Sir Winston Churchill's five-year-old Colonist. The winning time of 2:29.4 was a new track record. Supreme Court never raced again and was retired to stud at the end of the season.

== Assessment ==
The independent Timeform organisation gave Supreme Court a rating of 135 in 1951, making him their joint top-rated three-year-old of the year, alongside Arctic Prince and the French-trained Sicambre.

In their book, A Century of Champions, based on the Timeform rating system, John Randall and Tony Morris rated Supreme Court an "average" winner of the King George.

== Stud record ==
Supreme Court stood as a stallion at the Banstead Manor stud for ten years until his death in 1962. He was not considered a success as a sire, but his offspring did include several good winners including Pipe of Peace (Middle Park Stakes, third in the Derby), Cadmus (Prix d'Harcourt), Test Case (Gimcrack Stakes) and Court Prince (Jockey Club Stakes). He also sired the 1964 Champion Hurdler Magic Court. Supreme Court's daughter Athene produced the 1973 Arc de Triomphe winner Rheingold.

== Pedigree ==
Pedigree of Supreme Court (GB), brown stallion, 1948
Sire Precipitation (GB) 1933	Hurry On; 1913	Marcovil	Marco
Sire Precipitation (GB) 1933	Hurry On; 1913	Marcovil	Lady Villikins
Sire Precipitation (GB) 1933	Hurry On; 1913	Toute Suite	Sainfoin
Sire Precipitation (GB) 1933	Hurry On; 1913	Toute Suite	Star
Sire Precipitation (GB) 1933	Double Life; 1926	Bachelor's Double	Tredennis
Sire Precipitation (GB) 1933	Double Life; 1926	Bachelor's Double	Lady Bawn
Sire Precipitation (GB) 1933	Double Life; 1926	Saint Joan	Willbrook
Sire Precipitation (GB) 1933	Double Life; 1926	Saint Joan	Flo Desmond
Dam Forecourt (GB) 1943	Fair Trial; 1932	Fairway	Phalaris
Dam Forecourt (GB) 1943	Fair Trial; 1932	Fairway	Scapa Flow
Dam Forecourt (GB) 1943	Fair Trial; 1932	Lady Juror	Son-In-Law
Dam Forecourt (GB) 1943	Fair Trial; 1932	Lady Juror	Lady Josephine
Dam Forecourt (GB) 1943	Overture; 1937	Dastur	Solario
Dam Forecourt (GB) 1943	Overture; 1937	Dastur	Friar's Daughter
Dam Forecourt (GB) 1943	Overture; 1937	Overmantle	Apron
Dam Forecourt (GB) 1943	Overture; 1937	Overmantle	Arabella (Family: 14-c)
