= Hurry On =

British-bred Thoroughbred racehorse

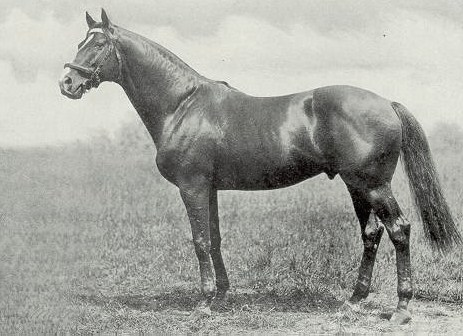
- Sire: Marcovil
- Grandsire: Marco
- Dam: Tout Suite
- Damsire: Sainfoin
- Sex: Stallion
- Foaled: 7 May 1913
- Country: Great Britain
- Colour: Chestnut
- Breeder: William Murland
- Owner: James Buchanan
- Trainer: Fred Darling
- Record: 6: 6-0-0
- Earnings: £3,248

Major wins
- St. Leger (1916); Jockey Club Cup (1916)

Honours
- Leading sire in Great Britain & Ireland (1926); Leading broodmare sire in Britain & Ireland (1938, 1944, 1945)
- Last updated on 13 June 2009

Hurry On (7 May 1913 – 1936) was an undefeated British Thoroughbred racehorse and sire that revived the Matchem sire line. English trainer Fred Darling called Hurry On the best horse he ever trained.

== Breeding ==
Hurry On was by Marcovil, who won two races and was an ordinary sire. His dam was the unraced Toute Suite by Sainfoin, who sired English Triple Crown winner Rock Sand. Marcovil was inbred to Hermit in the 3rd remove. Hurry On cost his Scotch whisky producer owner James Buchanan, later Baron Woolavington, 500 guineas as a yearling. He was a late colt, having been foaled on 7 May, but he matured into a 17 hands high horse.

== Racing record ==
As he was a backward late colt, Hurry On was not raced as a two-year-old and was not entered in The Derby. He was undefeated in all of his six three-year-old starts, ranging in distance from 8 to 14 furlongs, which included the wartime St. Leger at Newmarket Racecourse and the Jockey Club Cup.

== Stud record ==
Hurry On sired Epsom Derby winner Captain Cuttle from the first mare he covered at stud and was the Leading sire in Great Britain & Ireland in 1926, the year his colt Coronach emulated Captain Cuttle at Epsom. He sired a third Derby winner in Call Boy, as well as two Epsom Oaks winners, Pennycomequick and Toboggan, and two 1,000 Guineas winners, Plack and Cresta Run. In 1921 his stud fee was 200 guineas.

These sons of Hurry On sired further stakes-winners:

- Captain Cuttle (GB) 1919, exported to Italy
- Coronach (GB) 1923, sired two winners of the Italian Derby before he was given away and exported to New Zealand, where he was a successful sire that produced 16 stakes winners for 23 stakes wins.
- Defoe (GB) 1926, successful sire in New Zealand
- Excitement (IRE) 1927, successful sire in Australia of Russia (Melbourne Cup) and others
- Hunter’s Moon (GB) 1926, pedigree influence in several South American countries, including direct sire lines still existing on that continent
- Hunting Song (IRE) 1919, a leading sire in New Zealand for six successive years
- Precipitation, a successful racehorse and sire that maintained the Matchem sireline
- Roger De Busli (GB) 1920, exported to Australia, sire of Rogilla (Sydney Cup etc.)

Hurry On's daughters produced seven Classics winners, including Court Martial. This led to him becoming the Leading broodmare sire in Great Britain & Ireland in 1938, 1944 and 1945.

== Sire line tree ==
- Hurry On
  - Captain Cuttle
    - Mint Master
    - Walter Gay
    - The Recorder
    - Pilade
      - Gong
  - Diligence
    - Dick Turpin
  - Hunting Song
  - Werewolf
    - Free Fare
    - Bogskar
    - Silver Fame
  - Roger de Busli
  - Town Guard
    - Pougatchev
      - Meli Melo
  - Coronach
    - Highlander
    - Montrose
    - De Albertis
    - Cranach
      - Ciel Etoile
      - Violoncelle
    - Niccolo dell'Arca
      - Daumier
      - Nick La Rocca
      - Pluchino
      - Candleabra
      - Nicholas Nickleby
  - Nesiotes
    - Maenio
    - Fante
  - Call Boy
  - Messenger Boy
  - Cyclonic
  - Lord Warden
  - Defoe
    - Defaulter
  - Hunter's Moon
    - Helium
    - Halifax
      - Picafort
    - Haricot
    - Holy Smoke
      - Arnedano
    - Carnaval
      - Norweste
    - Taltal
      - Los Copahues
      - Combatiente
    - Postin
      - Pertinaz
      - Pavin
      - Pirulin
      - Pavelo
      - Postor
      - Rio Pallanga
      - Pencil
      - Parrot
        - Aquascutum
        - Parnassus
        - Piz Buin
          - Lord Jack
      - Portago
      - Polaris
    - Halconero
    - Hamlet
    - Fairplay
    - Acapulco
  - Excitement
    - Russia
      - Carolos
      - Georgie
      - Noredski
  - Press Gang
  - Accelerator
  - Garryclogher
  - Precipitation
    - Furioso
      - Lutteur B
      - Lurioso
      - Mexico
        - Le Mexico
        - Laeken
        - Jexico du Parc
      - Furioso II
        - Heisman
        - Voltaire
        - For Pleasure
      - Brilloso
        - Livarot
    - Admiral's Luck
    - Chamossaire
      - Le Sage
      - Chamier
      - Cambremer
      - Your Highness
      - Santa Claus
        - Reindeer
    - Preciptic
    - Airborne
      - Flyingbolt
    - Count Rendered
    - Summertime
    - Supreme Court
      - Court Prince
      - Pipe of Peace
      - Magic Court
      - Test Case
      - Middle Temple
      - Cadmus
    - Premonition
      - Goupi
    - Agricola
    - Sheshoon
      - Sassafras
        - Henri le Balafre
        - Galway Bay
      - Mon Fils

== Pedigree ==
Pedigree of Hurry On (GB), chestnut stallion, 1913
| Sire Marcovil 1903 | Marco; 1892 | Barcaldine | Solon |
| Sire Marcovil 1903 | Marco; 1892 | Barcaldine | Ballyroe |
| Sire Marcovil 1903 | Marco; 1892 | Novitiate | Hermit* |
| Sire Marcovil 1903 | Marco; 1892 | Novitiate | Retty |
| Sire Marcovil 1903 | Lady Villikins; 1885 | Hagioscope | Speculum |
| Sire Marcovil 1903 | Lady Villikins; 1885 | Hagioscope | Sophia |
| Sire Marcovil 1903 | Lady Villikins; 1885 | Dinah | Hermit* |
| Sire Marcovil 1903 | Lady Villikins; 1885 | Dinah | The Ratcatcher's Daughter |
| Dam Tout Suite 1904 | Sainfoin; 1887 | Springfield | St. Albans |
| Dam Tout Suite 1904 | Sainfoin; 1887 | Springfield | Viridis |
| Dam Tout Suite 1904 | Sainfoin; 1887 | Sanda | Wenlock |
| Dam Tout Suite 1904 | Sainfoin; 1887 | Sanda | Sandal |
| Dam Tout Suite 1904 | Star; 1887 | Thurio | Cremorne |
| Dam Tout Suite 1904 | Star; 1887 | Thurio | Verona |
| Dam Tout Suite 1904 | Star; 1887 | Meteor | Thunderbolt |
| Dam Tout Suite 1904 | Star; 1887 | Meteor | Duty (Family: 2-d) |

* Hurry On is inbred 4S × 4S to the stallion Hermit, meaning that he appears twice fourth generation on the sire side of his pedigree.

== See also ==
- List of leading Thoroughbred racehorses
