= Eph Smith =

English jockey (1915–1972)

Personal information
- Born: 4 May 1915 Shottesbrook, Berkshire
- Died: August 1972 (aged 57) Newmarket, Suffolk
- Occupation: Jockey

Horse racing career
- Sport: Horse racing
- Career wins: 2,313

Major racing wins
- British Classic races 2000 Guineas Stakes (1939); Derby Stakes (1939); St Leger Stakes (1953); Other major races Ascot Gold Cup (1939, 1945); Champion Stakes (1940, 1941, 1946, 1948); Coronation Cup (1943, 1954); Dewhurst Stakes (1937, 1959); Eclipse Stakes (1939); Goodwood Cup (1933, 1937, 1961); July Cup (1945, 1948, 1952); King George VI and Queen Elizabeth Stakes (1954); Middle Park Stakes (1942, 1957, 1962); Nunthorpe Stakes (1942, 1943); St. James's Palace Stakes (1939, 1958, 1962); Sussex Stakes (1958); Yorkshire Oaks (1962, 1963)

Racing awards
- British flat racing Champion Apprentice (1933, 1934, 1935)

Significant horses
- Aureole, Blue Peter, Hippius, Honeyway, Linklater, Major Portion, Predominate, Premonition, Ribbon, Sans Peine

Eric Ephraim Smith (1915 - 1972) was an English flat racing jockey, who rode over 2,000 winners, including the winners of three Classics, in a career spanning over 30 years. He was three times the British flat racing Champion Apprentice and was ranked 23rd in the Racing Post's top 50 jockeys of the 20th century.

== Early life ==
Eric Ephraim Smith was born in 1915 to Ernest Smith, a farmer, in Shottesbrook, Berkshire. His younger brother, Doug, also became a top jockey. Another brother, Charles, was a successful point-to-point rider. Their father taught all of them to ride. Eph had deafness and had to wear a hearing aid.

== Career ==
=== Apprenticeship ===
Smith was apprenticed to Major Sneyd in Sparsholt, Oxfordshire in 1929 and spent seven years there. Riding Red Queen he beat Champion Jockey, Gordon Richards by a short head to get his first victory on 15 August 1930. From 1933, he was Champion Apprentice in three consecutive years.

=== Rider for Jack Jarvis ===
Between 1933 and 1948, he rode for trainer Jack Jarvis for whom he won many notable races.

In the mid-1930s, he won several major handicaps, including the 1934 Free Handicap on Phaleron Bay, the 1934 Northumberland Plate on Whiteplains, the 1934 November Handicap on Pip Emma and the 1935 Lincoln on Flamenco. In 1938, he won another Lincoln and the Victoria Cup on Phakos and the Ayr Gold Cup on Old Reliance. The Goodwood Cup gave him Group 1 success on Sans Peine in 1933 and Fearless Fox in 1937.

His greatest moments came at the end of the decade riding Lord Rosebery's horse Blue Peter on whom he won the first two legs of the Triple Crown, the 2000 Guineas and Derby, as well as the Eclipse.

In the early 1940s, he won two Champion Stakes on Hippius. Other horses that gave him multiple big race victories included Honeyway, winner of the Victoria Cup and Champion Stakes in 1946, and Reynard Volant on whom he won two Ascot Stakes (1946 and 1947) and the 1946 Goodwood Stakes. He had success for other trainers too, including consecutive Nunthorpe Stakes for William Smyth on Linklater.

He was unfortunate not to win at least one other Classic on Ribbon in 1943. In the Oaks, another horse, Noontide, swerved across her, leaving her facing the wrong way. Ribbon ran on in the closing stages, only to be beaten by a neck by Why Hurry. For the rest of his life, Jarvis felt that Ribbon had been robbed. Ribbon was also unlucky in that year's St Leger. After a rough race, it appeared that she had won by a short head according to observers. However, the judge, called the race for Herringbone.

=== Rider for Jim Joel ===
From 1949 until his retirement, he was stable jockey to Jim Joel. For Joel, he partnered Major Portion, a miler who won at the top level multiple times - the Middle Park Stakes, St James's Palace Stakes, Sussex Stakes and Queen Elizabeth II Stakes. On Predominate, he won a hat-trick of Goodwood Stakes (1958–1960) as well as the Queen Alexandra Stakes in 1960 and the Goodwood Cup in 1961.

He was also associated with the stable of Cecil Boyd-Rochfort (although William Carr was stable jockey) and rode for the Royal Family. in 1950, he won the Cesarewitch Handicap and Yorkshire Oaks in the colours of King George VI on Above Board. Then, in 1954, he won the King George VI and Queen Elizabeth Stakes on Aureole, another royal horse. For Boyd-Rochfort, he also won his one and only St Leger on Premonition.

He also had success riding for Jack Waugh including a Coventry Stakes win on Amerigo at Royal Ascot and the 1959 Cheveley Park Stakes and Molecomb Stakes on Queensberry.

== Later life ==
Ill health put an end to his racing career in the early 1960s, although he continued to work as a work rider for Noel Murless. He had won 2,313 races over 37 years. He published his autobiography, Riding To Win, in 1968. He was found dead in a brook near Newmarket in August 1972. The court ruled it to be death by misadventure. He left an estate of £141,798. He was married to Doreen, who died in 2014.

== Style and reputation ==
Smith was a "plucky and dependable" rider, who held his own among the most accomplished riders of the time, including Richards. He didn't win as many races as his brother, who was five times Champion Jockey, but some regarded him as being the greater talent. He retained the Berkshire accent of his family and his forthright opinions and lack of diplomacy likely cost him employment. He would frequently refer to poor horses he rode as a cow or a pig.

== Major wins ==
(United Kingdom) Great Britain

- 2000 Guineas Stakes – Blue Peter (1939)
- Derby Stakes – Blue Peter (1939)
- St Leger Stakes – Premonition (1953)
- Ascot Gold Cup – Flyon (1939), Ocean Swell (1945)
- Champion Stakes – Hippius (1940), Hippius (1941), Honeyway (1946), Solar Slipper (1948)
- Coronation Cup – Hyperides (1943), Aureole (1954)
- Dewhurst Stakes – Manorite (1937), Ancient Lights (1959)
- Eclipse Stakes – Blue Peter (1939)
- Goodwood Cup – Sans Peine (1933), Fearless Fox (1937), Predominate (1961)
- July Cup – Honeyway (1945), Palm Vista (1948), Set Fair (1952)
- King George VI and Queen Elizabeth Stakes – Aureole (1954)
- Middle Park Stakes – Ribbon (1942), Major Portion (1957), Crocket (1962)
- Nunthorpe Stakes – Linklater (1942), Linklater (1943)
- St. James's Palace Stakes – Admiral's Walk (1939), Major Portion (1958), Court Sentence (1962)
- Sussex Stakes – Major Portion (1958)
- Yorkshire Oaks – West Side Story (1962), Outcrop (1963)

== See also ==
- List of jockeys

== Bibliography ==
- Mortimer, Roger; Onslow, Richard; Willett, Peter (1978). Biographical Encyclopaedia of British Racing. London: Macdonald and Jane's. ISBN 0-354-08536-0.
- Tanner, Michael; Cranham, Gerry (1992). Great Jockeys of the Flat. Enfield, Middlesex: Guinness Publishing. ISBN 0-85112-989-7.
