= Precipitation (horse) =

British-bred Thoroughbred racehorse

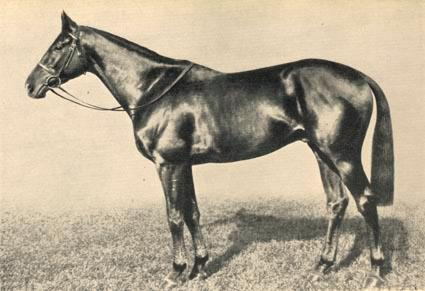
- Sire: Hurry On
- Grandsire: Marcovil
- Dam: Double Life
- Damsire: Bachelor's Double
- Sex: Stallion
- Foaled: 1933
- Country: Great Britain
- Colour: Chestnut
- Breeder: Lady Zia Wernher
- Owner: Lady Zia Wernher
- Record: 10: 7-0-0
- Earnings: $18,419

Major wins
- 1936 King Edward VII Stakes; 1937 Ascot Gold Cup
- Last updated on 3 March 2010

Precipitation (1933 – 6 March 1957) was an influential British-bred Thoroughbred stallion who is found in the pedigrees of many racehorses and sport horses today. He is responsible for helping maintain the Matchem sireline through his son, Sheshoon.

== Pedigree ==
He was by Hurry On and out of Double Life, a foundation mare of the famous British stud, Someries Stud. Hurry On, the sire of Precipitation, was unbeaten in his six starts and sired three winners of The Derby during the 1920s. Double Life was a good racemare that won six races worth £5,647 and then proved to be an exceptional broodmare. Her foals included Casanova (a winner and a good sire), Persian Gulf (Coronation Cup and outstanding sire) and Doubleton who was the grandam of Meld.

== Racing record ==
Precipitation did not race until he was three owing to a heel problem. He did well on the track, winning seven races including the 1937 Ascot Gold Cup (20f), King Edward VII Stakes (12f), Gratwicke Stakes and Queen's Prize (16f) for a total of £18,419.

== Stud record ==
He was successful at stud, producing seven classic winning racehorses and sport horses. During his stud career, which began in 1938, he was one of the leading sires in England, and produced over 50 stakes winners, including:

- Airborne (won St. Leger Stakes, Epsom Derby)
- Chamossaire (won St. Leger Stakes and a leading sire)
- Preciptic winner of 15 races including Druid Stakes, Lonsdale Handicap, Carew Stakes. stood at the Irish National Stud from age 7 until he died age 22.
- Supreme Court (King George VI and Queen Elizabeth Stakes (£36,949)
- Why Hurry (Epsom Oaks)
- Premonition (won St Leger Stakes)
- Amber Flash (Jockey Club Cup and dam of the Oaks Winner, Ambiguity)

In all Precipitation sired the winners of 431 races for prizemoney of £269,675. Precipitation's daughters produced the winners of 810 races worth £541,370.

In New Zealand, his blood lives on through the offspring of four great sons: Admiral's Luck, Count Rendered, Summertime and Agricola.

Precipitation is well known for siring sport horses too, including Furioso, the sire of the influential Furioso II and Cor de la Bryere.

Precipitation died on 6 March 1957.

== Sire line tree ==
- Precipitation
  - Furioso
    - Lutteur B
    - Lurioso
    - Mexico
      - Le Mexico
        - Silvano
        - Ulft
        - Zelhem
        - Zonneglans
        - Astronaut
        - Expert
      - Laeken
      - Jexico du Parc
    - Furioso II
      - Purioso
      - Heisman
      - Voltaire
        - Concorde
        - Flying Electro
        - Farmer
        - Forever
        - Mexcalero
        - Play It Again
        - Altair
        - Kannon
        - Kingston
        - Now or Never M
        - Popeye K
      - For Pleasure
    - Brilloso
      - Livarot
        - Souviens Toi III
  - Admiral's Luck
  - Chamossaire
    - Le Sage
    - Chamier
    - Cambremer
    - Your Highness
    - Santa Claus
      - Reindeer
  - Preciptic
  - Airborne
    - Flyingbolt
  - Count Rendered
  - Summertime
  - Supreme Court
    - Court Prince
    - Pipe of Peace
    - Magic Court
    - Test Case
    - Middle Temple
    - Cadmus
  - Premonition
    - Goupi
  - Agricola
  - Sheshoon
    - Sassafras
      - Henri le Balafre
        - As de Pique
        - Quintus Ferus
        - Henry Junior
        - Ken Graf
        - Thignon Lafre
      - Galway Bay
    - Pleben
    - Mon Fils
