= Tommy Lowrey =

British jockey

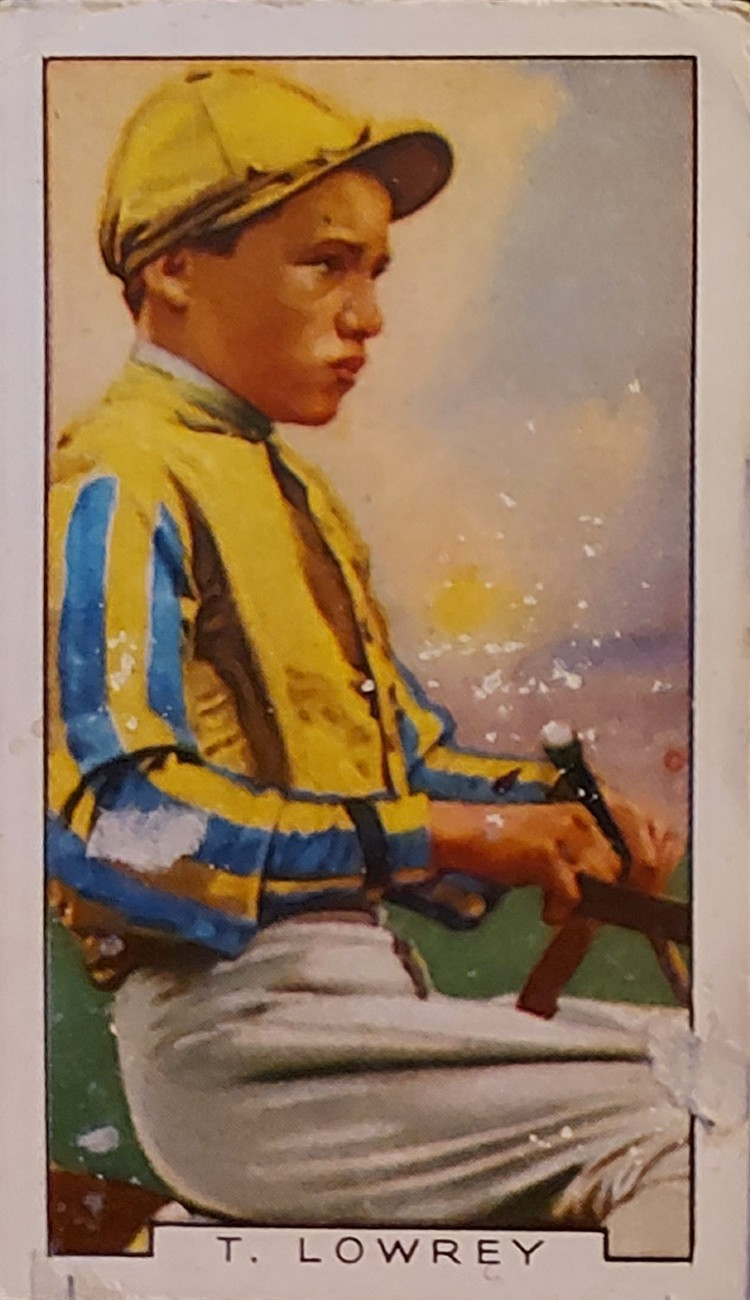
- Tommy Lowrey, in the colours of Major John Sewell Courtauld (Gallaher's cigarette card, 1936)

Personal information
- Born: 6 September 1911 Felling, County Durham, England
- Died: 21 January 1991 (aged 79) Colchester, Essex, England
- Occupation: Jockey

Horse racing career
- Sport: Horse racing

Major racing wins
- British Classic Race wins: Derby Stakes (1946); St Leger Stakes (1945, 1946); Other major wins: Goodwood Cup (1939); July Cup (1939); Sussex Stakes (1939)

Significant horses
- Airborne, Chamossaire

Tommy Lowrey (6 September 1911 - 21 January 1991) was a three-times Classic-winning jockey whose major successes came either side of the Second World War, most notably on Airborne, trained by Dick Perryman, on which he won two of the three British Triple Crown races in 1946.

== Career ==
Lowrey was born in Felling, County Durham on 6 September 1911, the son of a coal miner.

Early in his career, he was apprenticed to Jack Jarvis and he made his debut at Newbury on Dardanella. His first winner came at Lincoln on a horse called Rose Cottage on 20 March 1929. A valuable early victory came on Mohawk in the 1929 Liverpool Autumn Handicap. He then became known for his success with juvenile sprinters, winning four big two-year-old events in 1935, including the Molecomb Stakes at Goodwood on Major John Courtauld's Cross Patch and the Chesham Stakes at Royal Ascot on Pike Barn.

In 1939 he became retained jockey to Lord Glanely, who was twice champion owner and known for regularly changing his trainers. This became a breakthrough year for Lowrey. He won the Sussex Stakes on Olien, July Cup on Portobello and Goodwood Cup on Dubonnet. Dubonnet, trained by Basil Jarvis, had been lame the night before the race, and cantered to post short, but still won.

His greatest wins came at the end of the war for trainer Dick Perryman. For him, he won the 1945 substitute St Leger at York on Chamossaire, before doing the Derby and St Leger double in 1946 with Airborne. Prior to the Derby, Airborne was one of only three horses to have previously won over a mile and a half. However, that victory had been in an unexceptional maiden at Newmarket, and Perryman's was not a fashionable stable, so the horse was priced at long odds of 50/1. As they entered the last half mile, first Gordon Richards on Edward Tudor, then Harry Wragg on Gulf Stream looked the likely winners, until Airborne came up on the outside and beat them all.

His last winner came on Florient on 26 June 1954, for a career total of 508 winners. He died in Colchester Hospital on 21 January 1991.

== Major wins ==
(United Kingdom) Great Britain

- Derby Stakes - Airborne (1946)
- St Leger Stakes - (2) - Chamossaire (1945), Airborne (1946)
- Goodwood Cup - Dubonnet (1939)
- July Cup - Portobello (1939)
- Sussex Stakes - Olein (1939)

== See also ==
- List of jockeys
