= Charlie Elliott (jockey) =

British jockey

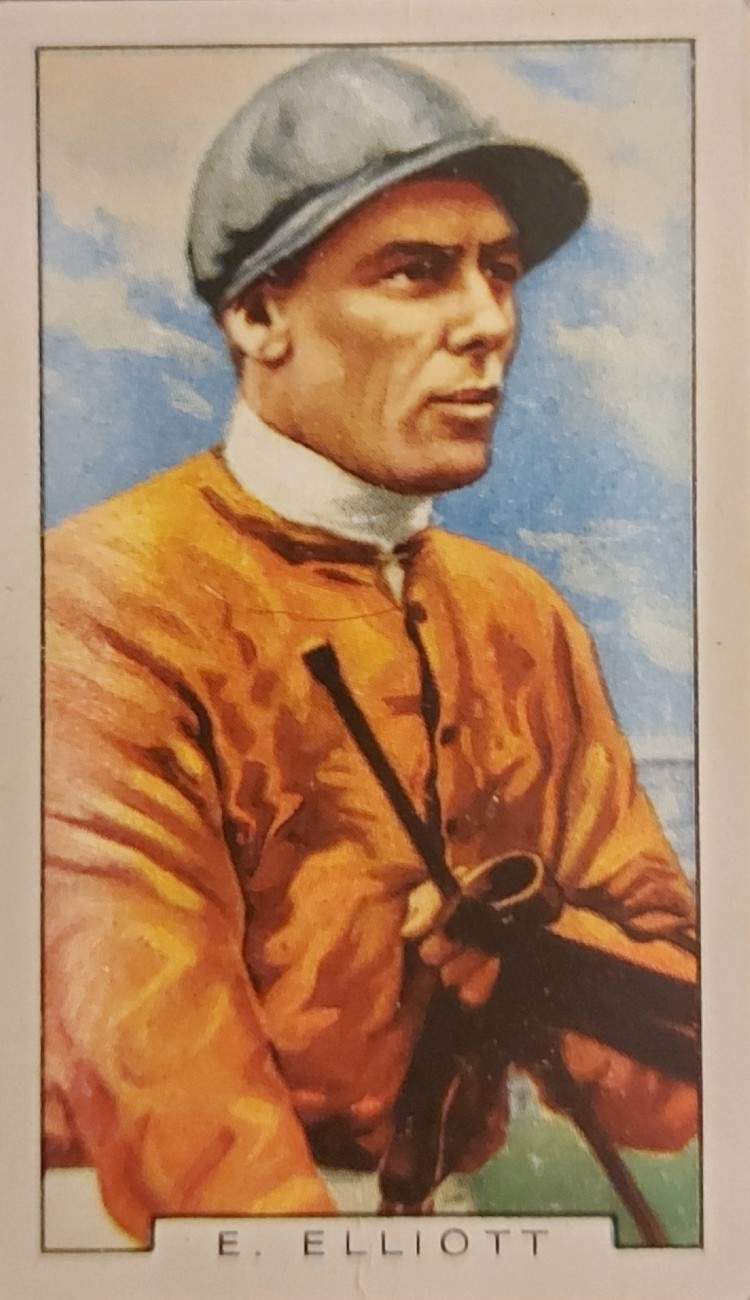
- Charlie Elliott, in the colours of Marcel Boussac (Gallaher's cigarette card, 1936)

Personal information
- Born: 3 October 1904
- Died: 6 January 1979 (aged 74)
- Occupations: Jockey, Trainer

Horse racing career
- Sport: Horse racing

Major racing wins
- British Classic Race wins as jockey: 1,000 Guineas (4); 2,000 Guineas (5); Epsom Oaks (2); Epsom Derby (3)

Racing awards
- British flat racing Champion Jockey; 1923, 1924

Significant horses
- Corrida, Caracalla, Nimbus, Arbar

Edward Charles Elliott (3 October 1904 – 6 January 1979) was a twice British Champion flat racing jockey.

He was still an apprentice to John L Jarvis when he won his first jockey's title (which he shared with Steve Donoghue) in 1923. He won again the following year, with a total of 106 winners. Among his early Classic successes was the 1927 Derby on Call Boy.

He would go on to spend a large part of his riding career in France, riding for Marcel Boussac, for whom he also won the 1935 Middle Park Stakes on Abjer. He would return to France after he finished riding in 1953 to train for him as well. In France, he won the 1936 and 1937 Prix de l'Arc de Triomphe on Corrida and the 1946 edition on Caracalla as well as the 1939 Grand Prix de Paris on Pharis. He would continue to have other big winners in Britain, including the 1938 Derby on Bois Roussel.

In the post-war period, he rode for George Colling. When Colling was unable to train due to illness, he prepared Nimbus to go and win the 1949 2,000 Guineas and Derby. He won the inaugural King George VI and Queen Elizabeth Stakes in 1951 on Supreme Court. He took up full-time training with Boussac, but after that finished in 1958, he also spent five years training at Machell House, Newmarket before retiring in 1963.

In total, he won fourteen British Classic Races and in 1999, the Racing Post ranked him as sixth in their list of the Top 50 jockeys of the 20th century. They noted his failings as being out of the saddle, namely gambling and lack of business sense.

== Major wins ==
(United Kingdom) Great Britain

=== Classics ===
- 1,000 Guineas – (4) - Plack (1924), Four Course (1931), Kandy (1932), Picture Play (1944)
- 2,000 Guineas – (5) - Ellangowan (1923), Flamingo (1928), Djebel 1940, Lambert Simnel (1941), Nimbus (1949)
- Derby – (3) - Call Boy (1927), Bois Roussel (1938), Nimbus (1949)
- Oaks – (2) - Brulette (1931), Why Hurry (1943)

=== Selected other races ===
- Ascot Gold Cup – Golden Myth (1922)
- Eclipse Stakes – Golden Myth (1922)
- King's Stand Stakes – Gold Bridge (1934)
- King George VI and Queen Elizabeth Stakes - Supreme Court (1951)
- Nunthorpe Stakes - Gold Bridge (1934)

France

- Grand Prix de Paris - Pharis (1939)
- Prix de l'Arc de Triomphe - Corrida (1936, 1937), Caracalla (1946)
