= Premonition (horse) =

British-bred Thoroughbred racehorse

- Sire: Precipitation
- Grandsire: Hurry On
- Dam: Trial Ground
- Damsire: Fair Trial
- Sex: Stallion
- Foaled: 1950
- Country: United Kingdom
- Colour: Bay
- Breeder: Dunchurch Lodge Stud
- Owner: Wilfred Penfold Wyatt
- Trainer: Cecil Boyd-Rochfort
- Record: 14:8-2-0
- Earnings: £27,497

Major wins
- Blue Riband Trial Stakes (1953); Irish Derby Stakes (1953, disqualified); Great Voltigeur Stakes (1953); St. Leger Stakes (1953); Yorkshire Cup (1954)
- Last updated on July 26, 2008

Premonition (1950–1970) was a British Thoroughbred racehorse and sire. In a career which lasted from autumn 1952 until July 1954 he ran fourteen times and won eight races. He won the Classic St Leger as a three-year-old in 1953, a year in which he also won the Great Voltigeur Stakes and was controversially disqualified in the Irish Derby. He won the Yorkshire Cup as a four-year-old in 1954 before being retire to stud, where he made very little impact as a stallion.

== Background ==
Premonition was a bay horse bred at the Dunchurch Lodge Stud in Warwickshire by his owner, Brigadier Wilfred Penfold Wyatt. He was sired by the Ascot Gold Cup winner Precipitation, a descendant of the Godolphin Arabian. His dam, Trial Ground won one minor race before being bought by Wyatt for 7,800 guineas in December 1948. As a descendant of the broodmare Molly Desmond, Premonition came from the same branch of Thoroughbred family 14-c which also produced Brigadier Gerard and St. Paddy.

Wyatt sent the colt into training with Cecil Boyd-Rochfort at his Freemason Lodge stables in Newmarket.

== Racing career ==
=== 1952: two-year-old season ===
As a two-year-old Premonition did not run until the autumn. He won two races, including the Gainsborough Stakes over one mile at Hurst Park Racecourse.

=== 1953: three-year-old season ===
In early 1953, Premonition was aimed for The Derby. He began by winning the Blue Riband Trial Stakes at Epsom Downs Racecourse. In the Trial Stakes at Sandown Park Racecourse he started at odds of 30/100 but was surprisingly beaten by Bandoola, in a slowly run race. At York Racecourse, Premonition established himself as a leading contender for the Derby with an impressive win in the Great Northern Stakes.

In the Derby at Epsom, Premonition started 5/1 joint-favourite with Pinza in a field of twenty-seven runners. He was never in contention at any stage and finished unplaced behind Pinza and the Queen's colt Aureole. At the end of June, Premonition was sent to contest the Irish Derby at the Curragh. He won by a head from the Irish-trained favourite Chamier, ridden by Bill Rickaby, in a rough finish. Following a consultation with Chamier's trainer Vincent O'Brien, Rickaby lodged an objection to the winner on the grounds of "boring" in the closing stages. The stewards sustained the objection and disqualified Premonition. Boyd-Rochfort felt that he had been unfairly treated and did not run a horse in an Irish Classic for twelve years. He also purchased a newsreel film of the race and had it shown for a week at cinemas in Newmarket.

Premonition was then prepared for the St Leger. In August he won the Voltigeur Stakes at York from Empire Honey, who had finished ahead of him in the Derby. In the St Leger at Doncaster in September, Premonition started at odds of 10/1, with Aureole, who was also trained by Boyd-Rochfort being made favourite at 6/4, and the French-trained Northern Light, winner of the Grand Prix de Paris also being strongly fancied. Both the Queen and Sir Winston Churchill were in attendance on a fine autumn day which attracted a crowd of 250,000 to the Yorkshire course. Ridden by Eph Smith, Premonition stayed on strongly in the straight to take the lead and won going away by three lengths from Northern Light, with Aureole in third.

=== 1954: four-year-old season ===
In 1954, Premonition was prepared for the major staying races. To assist his preparation, Wyatt purchased a supposedly ordinary French horse named Osborne to act as his training partner and pacemaker. His season began successfully as he won the Yorkshire Cup in impressive style by three lengths from Eastern Emperor, Childe Harolde and Osborne. Premonition and Osborne ran next in the Winston Churchill Stakes at Hurst Park. Before the race, Boyd-Rochfort told Osborne's rider, an inexperienced jockey named Royce Burrows, to set the pace for Premonition, the 1/8 favourite, and to "be second if you can". Osborne led Premonition into the straight, where it soon became apparent that he was travelling much more easily than his better fancied stable companion. In the closing stages, Burrows made little attempt to ride a finish, allowing the hard-ridden Premonition to win by a head. The racecourse stewards held an enquiry and referred the matter to the Jockey Club, which fined Boyd-Rochfort £100 for his ambiguous instructions to Burrows. Boyd-Rochfort responded by saying that the punishment seemed to question his honesty and that he felt like retiring from the sport.

Premonition never recovered his best form, finishing unplaced in both the Ascot Gold Cup and the King George VI and Queen Elizabeth Stakes. Osborne, however, went on to win the Goodwood Stakes in July under top weight of 133 pounds and the Doncaster Cup in September.

== Assessment ==
Premonition was given a rating of 130 by Timeform in 1953.

In their book A Century of Champions, John Randall and Tony Morris rated Premonition an "average" St Leger winner.

== Stud career ==
Premonition was retired to stud but his record as a sire of winners was poor. His best runner was Goupi, who won the Jockey Club Cup in 1965. Premonition also sired the mare Now What, who produced the 1973 2000 Guineas winner Mon Fils. Premonition died in 1970.

== Pedigree ==
Pedigree of Premonition (GB), bay stallion, 1950
Sire Precipitation (GB) 1933	Hurry On; 1913	Marcovil	Marco
Sire Precipitation (GB) 1933	Hurry On; 1913	Marcovil	Lady Villikins
Sire Precipitation (GB) 1933	Hurry On; 1913	Tout Suite	Sainfoin
Sire Precipitation (GB) 1933	Hurry On; 1913	Tout Suite	Star
Sire Precipitation (GB) 1933	Double Life; 1926	Bachelor's Double	Tredennis
Sire Precipitation (GB) 1933	Double Life; 1926	Bachelor's Double	Lady Bawn
Sire Precipitation (GB) 1933	Double Life; 1926	Saint Joan	Willbrook
Sire Precipitation (GB) 1933	Double Life; 1926	Saint Joan	Flo Desmond
Dam Trial Ground (GB) 1944	Fair Trial; 1932	Fairway	Phalaris
Dam Trial Ground (GB) 1944	Fair Trial; 1932	Fairway	Scapa Flow
Dam Trial Ground (GB) 1944	Fair Trial; 1932	Lady Juror	Son-In-Law
Dam Trial Ground (GB) 1944	Fair Trial; 1932	Lady Juror	Lady Josephine
Dam Trial Ground (GB) 1944	Tip the Wink; 1934	Tetratema	The Tetrarch
Dam Trial Ground (GB) 1944	Tip the Wink; 1934	Tetratema	Scotch Gift
Dam Trial Ground (GB) 1944	Tip the Wink; 1934	Golden Silence	Swynford
Dam Trial Ground (GB) 1944	Tip the Wink; 1934	Golden Silence	Molly Desmond (Family: 14-c)
