= Cecil Boyd-Rochfort =

Irish thoroughbred racehorse trainer

Personal information
- Born: 1887 Middleton Park, County Westmeath, Ireland
- Died: 18 March 1983 (aged 95–96)
- Occupation: Trainer

Horse racing career
- Sport: Horse racing

Major racing wins
- British Classic Race wins: 2,000 Guineas (1); 1,000 Guineas (3); Epsom Oaks (2); Epsom Derby (1); St. Leger Stakes (6)

Honours
- Champion Trainer (1937, 1938, 1954, 1955, 1958)

Significant horses
- Flares, Precipitation, Sun Castle, Zarathustra, Aureole, Pall Mall, Premonition, Meld, Alcide, Red God, Parthia.

Sir Cecil Charles Boyd-Rochfort KCVO (1887 – 18 March 1983) was an Irish thoroughbred racehorse trainer who was British flat racing Champion Trainer five times.

== Background ==
Cecil was the son of Rochfort Hamilton Boyd-Rochfort and the grandson of George Augustus Boyd-Rochfort. He was educated at Eton College and served with the Scots Guards during World War I, winning the Croix de Guerre and reached the rank of captain. His brother, George Boyd-Rochfort (1880–1940), also served with the Scots Guards during World War I and won the Victoria Cross.

== Career ==
He trained for King George VI and then Queen Elizabeth II from 1943 until he retired in 1968, the same year in which he was knighted. His biggest royal wins were Pall Mall in the 1958 2,000 Guineas, Hypericum in the 1956 1,000 Guineas, Aureole in the 1954 King George VI and Queen Elizabeth Stakes and Canisbay in the 1965 Eclipse Stakes. He trained at Newmarket's Freemason Lodge Stables from 1923 to 1968. Brown Betty's 1933 Epsom Oaks win was his first classic, but his particular flair was for training stayers: Boswell's 1936 St. Leger triumph was the first of six final classic wins (from 13 entries). Boyd-Rochfort's only success in The Derby came in 1959 with Parthia. He was champion trainer in 1937, 1938, 1954, 1955 and 1958, and other top successes for his stable were the Ascot Gold Cup wins of Precipitation and Zarathustra, and in the later stages of his career he won the Goodwood Cup four times between 1962 and 1966. He was the stepfather of racehorse trainer Henry Cecil.
