= Bachelor's Double =

Irish-bred Thoroughbred racehorse

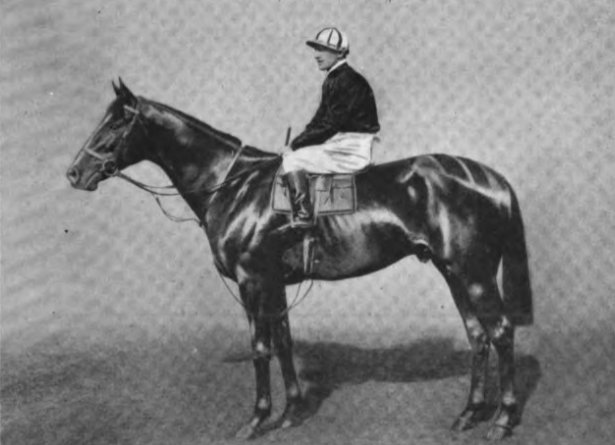
- Sire: Tredennis
- Grandsire: Kendal
- Dam: Lady Bawn
- Damsire: Le Noir
- Sex: Stallion
- Foaled: 22 April 1906
- Country: Ireland
- Colour: Chestnut
- Breeder: Albert Lowry
- Owner: 1) Albert Lowry (1906 – June 1910); 2) William W. Bailey (June–October 1910); 3) Mrs. W.W. Bailey (October 1910 – February 1931)
- Record: 17 starts, 9 wins
- Earnings: £10,536

Major wins
- Railway Stakes (1908); Irish Derby (1909); City and Suburban Handicap (1910); Royal Hunt Cup (1910); Jubilee Handicap (1911)

Bachelor's Double (22 April 1906 – 3 February 1931) was an Irish-bred Thoroughbred racehorse that raced in Ireland and Britain and was a successful sire in the early 20th century. He won the Irish Derby as a three-year-old and also won the City and Suburban Handicap in 1910 and the Kempton Jubilee in 1911. Retired to stud in 1912, he sired the 1921 Epsom Oaks winner Love in Idleness and the inaugural Prix de l'Arc de Triomphe winner Comrade. He died in 1931 in Ireland.

== Background ==
Bachelor's Double was foaled on 22 April 1906 at Oatlands Stud, the estate of his breeder Albert Lowry near Navan, County Meath, Ireland. His sire Tredennis was sired by Kendal and was the last foal produced by the 1,000 Guineas winner and prolific broodmare St Marguerite, the dam of Seabreeze (Oaks, St. Leger), Antibes (Yorkshire Oaks) and Roquebrune (the dam of Rock Sand). St Marguerite died the day after Tredennis was born and he was subsequently fostered by a cart horse mare. Tredennis was a mediocre racehorse with a skittish temperament that was winless in three starts. He was purchased by Albert Lowry in 1902 as a replacement for Lowry's main stallion Le Noir which had died that year in an accident. Tredennis became a leading stallion in the 1910s before his death in 1926, siring winners of 442 races and £134,100.

The dam of Bachelor's Double, Lady Bawn, was born at Oatlands in 1902 and was a twin to the mare Lady Black, being 20 minutes older than her sister. Twinning is a rare occurrence in horses and it was unusual for both twins to live to adulthood and rarer still for both to be successful broodmares. Lady Bawn was a half sister to the Ascot Gold Cup winner Bachelor's Buttons. Lady Bawn and Lady Black were unraced as was their sire Le Noir. Bachelor's Double was Lady Bawn's first foal and she also produced the good racers Bachelor's Hope, Bachelor's Image and Bachelor's Wedding. Lady Black produced six stakes winners, including the colts Bachelor's Charm and Melesigenes, who ran with success in India.

Most of Albert Lowry's horses were named with the prefix Bachelor's after the name of his father's, Joseph Lowry's, estate Bachelor's Lodge.

== Racing career ==
=== 1908: two-year-old season ===
Bachelor's Double started in and won two races at the Curragh as a two-year-old. In his first career start on 24 August, he won the £900 Leopardstown Grand Prize in a "good race", beating the Steward's Cup winner Golden Rod by a margin of two lengths. On 3 September, he won the £600 Railway Stakes beating the colt Atty by two lengths.

=== 1909: three-year-old season ===
On 29 June, Bachelor's Double won the Irish Derby at the Curragh, beating The Phoenician and Electric Boy by a length and a half. Running at the Curragh, he also won the two-mile His Majesty's Plate before travelling to England to run in the St. Leger Stakes in September. Going into the St. Leger as an undefeated racehorse, the press considered him to be a possible contender to Bayardo and Minoru, noting that while he was a stayer that had beaten stakes winners in Ireland, "his victories [may] have been easily gained and amount to little." He went off at 100 to 6 odds against six competitors and broke from the starting barrier well, falling into second place behind Mirador but was soon outpaced by Bayardo and Minoru at the first turn. Quickly losing ground at the Red House he finished in last place, Bayardo winning by a length and a half over Lord Carnarvon's colt Valens. Returned to the Curragh, he won the Lord Lieutenant's Plate in October to close the season.

=== 1910: four-year-old season ===
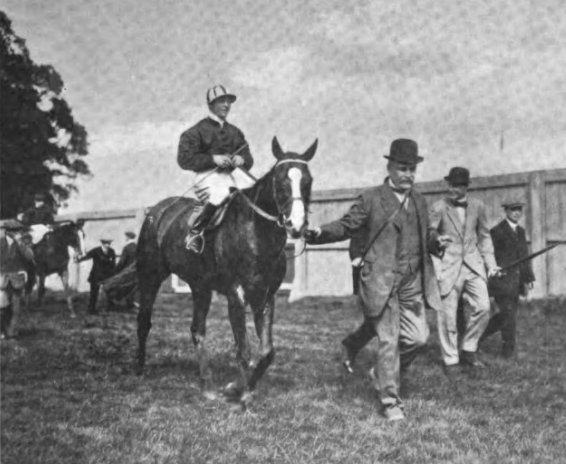
Bachelor's Double being led in after winning the 1911 Kempton Jubilee.

In his first start of the season, he astonished the public by winning the City and Suburban Handicap in a close finish. Minoru was much favoured at 3 to 1 to win the race, but going off at 25 to 1 odds and ridden by C. Trigg, Bachelor's Double battled the colt Mustapha to win by a neck with the third place horse Dean Swift two lengths behind. Minoru finished in seventh place. On 3 June, Bachelor's Double started in the Coronation Cup against eight other competitors, running against Mustapha and the American-bred colt Sir Martin, who had fallen in the previous year's running for the Derby. Sir Martin took the lead immediately and led throughout the mile and a half race, winning easily by a length and a half. The next day Lowry sold Bachelor's Double to rubber manufacturing magnate William Wellington Bailey for 6,000 guineas. On 13 June at Royal Ascot, he won the Royal Hunt Cup from the colt Eudorus. Two days later, he was third in the two-and a-half-mile Ascot Gold Cup, losing to Bayardo and Sea Sick. In July, he won the £2,000 Atlantic Stakes over a mile and a quarter. In the running for the Doncaster Cup, he finished second to Bronzino who won by six lengths. After an eighth-place finish in the Prince Edward Handicap at Manchester, plans were made to run Bachelor's Double in the Prix du Conseil Municipal in France, but before the colt could be shipped, William Bailey died on 4 October at the age of 57 and the colt's remaining racing engagements for the year were forfeited.

=== 1911: five-year-old season ===
After William Bailey's death, Bachelor's Double ran in the name of Sir George Murray, one of Bailey's estate executors, but ownership of the horse was retained by Bailey's widow. A persistent cough kept him from running until mid-May. At Kempton Park, Bachelor's Double started in the 25th running of the "Jubilee" Handicap, drawing the number one position, deemed the "worst", on the outside of the course's track. Leading the race from start to finish, he won in a canter by four lengths, beating Wolf Land and The Story. He finished eleventh in the Royal Hunt Cup at Ascot in which the mare Winkipop broke down and was also unplaced in the Prix du Conseil Municipal at Longchamp where his performance was so poor that the press remarked that he "almost walked past the winning post" at the finish. He was later scratched from the Cambridgeshire Stakes and was retired from racing.

== Stud career ==
Bachelor's Double was retired to stud in 1912 and stood his entire career at the Rathbane Stud in Limerick initially for a fee of £99. Ownership of the stallion was retained by Bailey's widow and the stud was managed in her name by Peter FitzGerald. He was fifth in the winning sires' list of 1920, siring offspring with combined earnings of £146,000. Bachelor's Double died on 3 February 1931 of heart failure at the age of 24 years.

=== Notable progeny ===
s = stallion, m = mare, g = gelding

Foaled	Name	Sex	Major Wins	Ref.
1914	Grand Fleet	s	Duke of York Stakes, July Stakes
1917	Comrade	s	Grand Prix de Paris, Prix de l'Arc de Triomphe
1918	Love in Idleness	m	Epsom Oaks, Yorkshire Oaks, Park Hill Stakes
1917	Hunt Law	s	Northumberland Plate
1917	Roman Bachelor	s	King George Stakes
1918	Double Hackle	s	Northumberland Plate, Ascot Stakes
1919	Backwood	s	King Edward VII Stakes, Melbourne Cup
1919	Two Step	m	Challenge Stakes
1921	Audlem	s	Queen's Vase
1922	Bar Sinister	m	Falmouth Stakes
1923	Glasheen	m	Park Hill Stakes, Falmouth Stakes
1925	Double Pay	s	Long Beach Handicap
1926	Double Life	m	Duke of York Handicap, Chesterfield Cup, Cambridgeshire Handicap
1931	Guinea Gap	s	Royal Hunt Cup, Liverpool Spring Cup

== Pedigree ==
Pedigree of Bachelor's Double (IRE), Chestnut Stallion, 1906
Sire Tredennis (GB) Chestnut, 1898	Kendal; Ch, 1883	Bend Or	Doncaster
Sire Tredennis (GB) Chestnut, 1898	Kendal; Ch, 1883	Bend Or	Rouge Rose
Sire Tredennis (GB) Chestnut, 1898	Kendal; Ch, 1883	Windermere	Macaroni
Sire Tredennis (GB) Chestnut, 1898	Kendal; Ch, 1883	Windermere	Miss Agnes
Sire Tredennis (GB) Chestnut, 1898	St Marguerite; Ch, 1879	Hermit	Newminster
Sire Tredennis (GB) Chestnut, 1898	St Marguerite; Ch, 1879	Hermit	Seclusion
Sire Tredennis (GB) Chestnut, 1898	St Marguerite; Ch, 1879	Devotion	Stockwell
Sire Tredennis (GB) Chestnut, 1898	St Marguerite; Ch, 1879	Devotion	Alcestis
Dam Lady Bawn (IRE) Chestnut, 1902	Le Noir; Black, 1889	Isonomy	Sterling
Dam Lady Bawn (IRE) Chestnut, 1902	Le Noir; Black, 1889	Isonomy	Isola Bella
Dam Lady Bawn (IRE) Chestnut, 1902	Le Noir; Black, 1889	Knavery	Lord Clifden
Dam Lady Bawn (IRE) Chestnut, 1902	Le Noir; Black, 1889	Knavery	Flutter
Dam Lady Bawn (IRE) Chestnut, 1902	Milady; Bay, 1886	Kisber (HUN)	Buccaneer
Dam Lady Bawn (IRE) Chestnut, 1902	Milady; Bay, 1886	Kisber (HUN)	Mineral
Dam Lady Bawn (IRE) Chestnut, 1902	Milady; Bay, 1886	Alone	Hermit
Dam Lady Bawn (IRE) Chestnut, 1902	Milady; Bay, 1886	Alone	Young Melbourne mare (Family 21-a)
