= Tetratema =

Irish-bred Thoroughbred racehorse

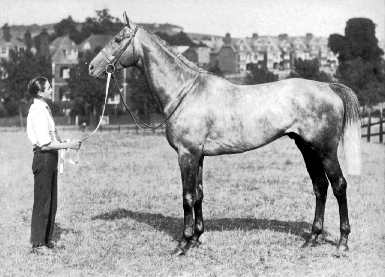
- Tetratema, c. 1921
- Sire: The Tetrarch
- Grandsire: Roi Herode
- Dam: Scotch Gift
- Damsire: Symington
- Sex: Stallion
- Foaled: 1917
- Country: Ireland
- Colour: Grey
- Breeder: Dermot McCalmont
- Owner: Dermot McCalmont
- Trainer: Atty Persse
- Record: 16: 13-1-0
- Earnings: £21,776

Major wins
- National Breeders' Produce Stakes (1919); Molecomb Stakes (1919); Champagne Stakes (1919); Imperial Produce Plate (1919); Middle Park Stakes (1919); 2,000 Guineas (1920); Fern Hill Stakes (1920); King George Stakes (1920, 1921); King's Stand Stakes (1921); July Cup (1921)

Awards
- Leading British money winner (1919); Top-rated two-year-old in Britain (1919); Leading sire in GB & Ireland (1929)
- Last updated on January 22, 2007

Tetratema (27 April 1917 – July 1939) was an Irish-bred, British-trained Thoroughbred racehorse and sire. In a racing career which lasted from May 1919 until October 1921 he won thirteen of his sixteen races, include the all twelve of his starts over the sprint distances of five and six furlongs. He was unbeaten in five races in 1919, including the Molecomb Stakes, Champagne Stakes, and Middle Park Stakes, and was the highest-rated two-year-old in Britain by a record margin. In the following year he had enough stamina to win the Classic 2000 Guineas over a mile, but failed to stay when unplaced in both The Derby and the Eclipse Stakes. He then returned to sprinting and won his remaining two races of 1920 and all four in 1921. His successes in this phase of his career included the King's Stand Stakes, July Cup and two runnings of the King George Stakes.

At the end of 1921 he was retired from racing and returned to his birthplace in Ireland to become a breeding stallion. He became a highly successful sire of winners and regularly featured among the leading sires in Britain and Ireland. Most of his best runners inherited their father's aptitudes, being particularly successful as two-year-olds and over sprint distances. Tetratema died at the age of twenty-two in 1939.

== Background ==
Tetratema was a grey horse bred and owned by Major Dermot McCalmont. He was a late foal, being born on 27 April 1917, at the Ballylinch Stud on McAlmont's Mount Juliet estate in Thomastown, County Kilkenny. McCalmont named his horse Tetratema, a choice which was described by one critic as being both "meaningless" and "ugly".

He was sired by The Tetrarch an unbeaten horse who was regarded as one of the fastest two-year-olds ever seen in Britain and Ireland, but whose career was ended by injury before he could race at three. The Tetrarch showed very little interest in his stud duties (his attitude towards sex was described as being "monastic in the extreme") and as a result sired few foals. Tetratema's performances enabled The Tetrarch to win his only sires' championship in 1919. Tetratema's dam Scotch Gift won the Somerville Stakes at Newmarket and became a successful broodmare: her other foals included Tetratema's full-brothers The Satrap, a very fast colt who won the July Stakes and Richmond Stakes in 1926, and Arch Gift a sprinter whose wins included the Bretby Stakes.

Like The Tetrarch, from whom he inherited his colour, Tetratema was trained throughout his racing career by Henry Seymour "Atty" Persse at Stockbridge in Hampshire. He was ridden in most of his races by the Australian jockey Brownie Carslake.

== Racing career ==
=== 1919: two-year-old season ===
Tetratema never contested a maiden race, beginning his racing career by winning the valuable National Breeder's Produce Stakes over five furlongs at Sandown Park Racecourse. At Goodwood in July he was ridden by Carslake to a four length victory in the £850 Molecomb Stakes at odds of 1/2 defeating a well-regarded colt named Orpheus, the winner of the New Stakes, "in a canter".

In September, Tetratema returned to win the Champagne Stakes at Doncaster by four lengths and in the following month he won the Imperial Produce Stakes at Kempton by six lengths from two opponents. On his final start of the year he contested Britain's most important two-year-old race, the £3,000 Middle Park Stakes over six furlongs at Newmarket and won by six lengths at odds of 1/4. According to press reports he won very easily, making "mincemeat" of his four opponents.

In the Free Handicap, a rating of the best two-year-olds to have raced in Britain that season, Tetratema was rated twelve pounds clear of his nearest rival. Some contemporary observers were lavish in their praise for the colt, commenting on his "electrical speed" and the "rhythmic perfection" of his action and describing him as "the best horse of his age... a marvel". His earnings for the season totaled £10,951, making him the highest earning racehorse of any age in Britain.

=== 1920: three-year-old season ===
Tetratema began 1920 as a leading contender for the Epsom Derby, but doubts were expressed about whether a horse with such speed could stay longer distances: W. Allison, writing in the London Sportsman doubted that the horse would even be effective over one mile. On his seasonal debut he was tried over seven furlongs in the Greenham Stakes at Newbury Racecourse on 9 April. Racing on heavy ground he took an early lead but was overtaken approaching the final furlong by Silvern to whom he was conceding three pounds. Tetratema appeared to lose his footing in the difficult conditions and although he rallied in the closing stages, he failed by half a length to catch Silvern in a result which was described as a "sensation". On 28 April Tetratema was one of seventeen colts to contest the 2000 Guineas over the Rowley Mile at Newmarket and started at odds of 2/1. He won by half a length from Allenby, with Paragon three lengths further back in third, becoming the first of his colour to win the race since Grey Momus in 1838. Modern sources have given the winning time as 1:43.2, but contemporary hand-timings differed widely, with 1:44.6, 1:43.6 and 1:39.8 all being reported. In the aftermath of the race Tetratema retained his position as Derby favourite ahead of Allenby and the Peter Gilpin-trained Sarchedon, and some experts even considered him a likely Triple Crown winner.

The Derby was run on an unusually hot day in front of an estimated crowd of 250,000 including the King and Queen. Tetratema, the 3/1 favourite, went into an early lead and set an extremely fast pace as he was challenged by Abbot’s Trace (ridden by Steve Donoghue). The favourite was struggling soon after half way and dropped from contention before the straight, eventually finishing unplaced behind the outsider Spion Kop. Two weeks after the Derby, Tetratema was brought back to sprinting at Royal Ascot and won the Fern Hill Stakes by six lengths from the two-year-old Galway Castle. When tested over ten furlongs in the Eclipse Stakes however, he again failed to stay and finished unplaced behind the four-year-old Buchan, who won from Silvern and Allenby.

Tetratema then reverted permanently to sprint distances and was never beaten again. On 28 July he ran in the King George Stakes at Goodwood in which he was opposed by the six-year-old mare Diadem who had won the 1000 Guineas in 1917 before becoming an outstanding sprinter. In what was described as a "splendid duel", Tetratema held off a strong challenge from Diadem to win by three-quarters of a length. Shortly after this race it was reported that McAlmont had refused an offer of £100,000 for the colt which would have more than doubled the highest price ever paid for a British or Irish racehorse. On his final race of the year, Tetratema won the Kennet Three-year-old Stakes over five furlongs at Newmarket.

=== 1921: four-year-old season ===
Tetratema remained in training at four and was undefeated in four races. He began his season in the King's Stand Stakes at Royal Ascot, in which he was opposed by a highly regarded colt named Vencedor. Carrying a weight of 143 pounds Tetratema started at odds of 6/5 won in a time of 1:01.8. Although the winning margin was only a length he was described as the easiest winner of the meeting, and it was implied that he could have won by much further had Carslake desired. After winning the July Cup from the filly Princess of Mars, he contested the King George Stakes at Goodwood in which he was opposed by Orpheus, who had won the Champion Stakes in October 1920. He was ridden with great confidence by Carslake, who never resorted to the whip as Tetratema won by a length from Orpheus, ending the race as if he had had no more than an exercise gallop. Some commentators, however, felt that the race would have been closer but for the indifferent performance of Orpheus' jockey, Hector Grey.

Although his retirement was announced in August, Tetratema returned to the track in October to end his racing career in the Snailwell Stakes over five furlongs at Newmarket. Carrying 136 pounds he won easily in a time of 1:01.6. At the end of the year he was retired to breeding duty at his owner's Ballylinch Stud.

== Assessment ==
As noted above, Tetrattema was the top-rated horse in the 1919 Free Handicap. His twelve-pound margin of superiority over his contemporaries remains the largest ever recorded. At the end of the season, the Bloodstock Breeders' Review commented that "critics began to wonder whether Tetratema was not a better colt then his brilliant sire. The chances certainly are that he is better." In their book A Century of Champions, based on a modified version of the Timeform system John Randall and Tony Morris rated Tetratema a “superior” winner of the 2000 Guineas and the third best two-year-old colt of the 20th century trained in Britain or Ireland, behind The Tetrarch and Tudor Minstrel. The same authors placed him fourth (behind Abernant, Irish Elegance and Pappa Fourway) in their list of British and Irish sprinters and rated him the second best horse foaled anywhere in 1917, four pounds inferior to Man o' War

== Stud career ==
Tetratema was a highly successful breeding stallion, winning the sire's championship in 1929 and finished in the top seven on the sire's list on a total of eleven occasions. The American breeder C. V. Whitney, held Tetratema in particularly high regard and imported many of the stallion's sons and daughters to the United States. Unlike his sire, whose stock performed well over a variety of distances, Tetratema's offspring were notable for their speed and precocity. The best of his progeny included:

- Fourth Hand (brown colt, foaled in 1924), winner of the Irish 2,000 Guineas
- Royal Minstrel (grey colt, 1925), St. James's Palace Stakes, Eclipse Stakes,
- Mr Jinks (grey colt, 1926), 2,000 Guineas, St. James's Palace Stakes, top-rated British two-year-old colt
- Tiffin (bay filly, 1926), Cheveley Park Stakes, July Cup, top-rated British two-year-old
- Queen of the Nore (chestnut filly, 1927), female-line ancestor of the Derby winners Teenoso and Sir Percy
- Myrobella (bay filly, 1928), July Cup, top-rated British two-year-old, dam of Big Game
- Four Course (bay filly, 1928), 1,000 Guineas
- Winsome Way (grey filly, 1928), female-line ancestor of Spectacular Bid
- Una (grey filly, 1930), dam of Palestine
- Bazaar (bay filly, 1931), Hopeful Stakes
- Theft (bay colt, 1932), five times leading sire in Japan
- Foray (grey colt, 1934), King's Stand Stakes, top-rated British two-year-old

Tetratema died in July 1939 at age twenty-two and is buried at Ballylinch Stud. Reports of his death described him as "one of the most famous racehorses of all time."

== Sire line tree ==
- Tetratema
  - Rolls Royce
  - Fourth Hand
  - Treat
  - Royal Minstrel
    - Gay Monarch
    - Singing Wood
    - Mr Bones
    - Court Scandal
    - Melodist
    - Time Step
    - First Fiddle
      - Master Fiddle
  - Mr Jinks
    - Maltravers
    - Fair William
      - Crusader's Horn
    - Rogerstone Castle
    - The Jigger
    - Effervescence
  - To You
  - Teacup
  - Tetrarchal
  - Arthos
  - Sherab
    - Doublrab
  - Tetramite
  - Thyestes
  - Bacteriophage
    - Teleferique
      - Torcello
      - Liberal
        - Corvet
      - Alizier
        - Kilometer
        - Argel
        - Seaulieu
        - Djebel Ali
        - Reinach
        - Jet Stream
        - Cirio
        - Chalchaqui
        - Crivelli
        - Sigebert
        - Tapalque
      - Cobalt
        - Millerole
      - Marly Knowe
      - Elu
      - Jangas
    - Bacchus
    - Irifle
  - Strathcarron
  - Gino
    - American Way
  - Alishah
    - Allison
  - Satyr
  - Turbotin
    - Palatino
  - Theft
    - Hayatake
    - Cymba
      - Dainana Hoshu
    - High Record
    - Takakurayama
    - Issei
      - Taisei Hope
    - Tokino Minoru
    - Bostonian
  - Theio
  - Lay Lord
  - Foray
  - Tahir
  - Prometheus
  - Quarteroon
  - Prince Tetra
  - Tetrabar
  - Zalophus
    - Kilmore

== Pedigree ==
Pedigree of Tetratema (IRE), grey stallion, 1917
Sire The Tetrarch (IRE) 1911	Roi Herode (FR); 1904	Le Samaritain	Le Sancy
Sire The Tetrarch (IRE) 1911	Roi Herode (FR); 1904	Le Samaritain	Clementina
Sire The Tetrarch (IRE) 1911	Roi Herode (FR); 1904	Roxelane	War Dance
Sire The Tetrarch (IRE) 1911	Roi Herode (FR); 1904	Roxelane	Rose of York
Sire The Tetrarch (IRE) 1911	Vahren (GB); 1897	Bona Vista	Bend Or
Sire The Tetrarch (IRE) 1911	Vahren (GB); 1897	Bona Vista	Vista
Sire The Tetrarch (IRE) 1911	Vahren (GB); 1897	Castania	Hagioscope
Sire The Tetrarch (IRE) 1911	Vahren (GB); 1897	Castania	Rose Garden
Dam Scotch Gift (GB) 1907	Symington (GB); 1893	Ayrshire	Hampton
Dam Scotch Gift (GB) 1907	Symington (GB); 1893	Ayrshire	Atalanta
Dam Scotch Gift (GB) 1907	Symington (GB); 1893	Siphonia	St Simon*
Dam Scotch Gift (GB) 1907	Symington (GB); 1893	Siphonia	Palmflower
Dam Scotch Gift (GB) 1907	Maund (GB); 1898	Tarporley	St Simon*
Dam Scotch Gift (GB) 1907	Maund (GB); 1898	Tarporley	Ruth
Dam Scotch Gift (GB) 1907	Maund (GB); 1898	Ianthe	The Miser
Dam Scotch Gift (GB) 1907	Maund (GB); 1898	Ianthe	Devonshire Lass (Family:14-a)

* Tetratema is inbred 4D x 4D to the stallion St Simon, meaning that he appears fourth generation twice on the dam side of his pedigree.
