= National Stakes (Sandown Park) =

Flat horse race in Britain

- Class: Listed
- Location: Sandown Park; Esher, England
- Inaugurated: 1889
- Race type: Flat / Thoroughbred
- Sponsor: Star Sports
- Website: Sandown Park

Race information
- Distance: 5f 10y (1,110m)
- Surface: Turf
- Track: Straight
- Qualification: Two-year-olds
- Weight: 9 st 2 lb Allowances; 5 lb for fillies Penalties; 5 lb for Group race winners 3 lb for Listed winners
- Purse: £45,000 (2026); 1st: £25,520

National Stakes
2026
| Where Love Lives | Adaay Of Scarlett | Princesse D'orange |

Previous years
2025
Anthelia | First Legion | Eskimo Pie
2024
Enchanting Empress | Rock Hunter | Zminiature
2023
Elite Status | World Of Darcy | Hackman
2022
Maria Branwell | Crispy Cat | Rumstar
2021
Ebro River | Little Earl | Navello

2020-2011
2020
Ubettabelieveit | Wings Of A Dove | Mcmanaman
2019
Flippa The Strippa | Jm Jackson | Strive For Glory
2018
Vintage Brut | Sabre | Konchek
2017
Havana Grey | Frozen Angel | Haddaf
2016
Global Applause | Mehmas | Bohemian Flame
2015
King Of Rooks | Buratino | Steady Pace
2014
Tiggy Wiggy | Cock Of The North | Roudee
2013
Rizeena | Andhesontherun | Eastern Impact
2012
Sir Prancealot | Top Boy | Effie B
2011
Pyman's Theory | Bannock | Magic City

2010-2001
2010
Dinkum Diamond | Chilworth Lad | Cape To Rio
2009
Monsieur Chevalier | Star Rover | Raine's Cross
2008
Icesolator | Finjaan | Foundation Room
2007
Sweepstake | Lady Avenger | Al Muheer
2006
Excellent Art | Cav Okay | Dress To Impress
2005
Salut d'Amour | Northern Empire | Sunrise Safari
2004
Polly Perkins | Moscow Music | Bunditten
2003
Russian Valour | Incise | Under My Spell
2002
Presto Vento | Arran Pilot | Silca Boo
2001
Shiny | Maktavish | Triple Play

2000-1991
2000
Taras Emperor | Stregone | Elsie Plunkett
1999
Rowaasi | Fairy Gem | Nasaieb
1998
Bint Allayl | Speedy James | Monkston Point
1997
Pool Music | Banningham Blade | Nadwah
1996
Deadly Dudley | Roman Imp | Daylight In Dubai
1995
Amaretto Bay | Cayman Kai | Whicksey Perry
1994
Signs | Prism | Subzero
1993
Redoubtable | Risky | Fast Eddy
1992
Lyric Fantasy | Hazy Kay | Ancestral Dancer
1991
Marling | Miss Bluebird | Lady Of Mann

1990-1988
1990
Balwa | Tinkins Wood | It's All Academic
1989
Princess Taufan | Old Alliance | Petillante
1988
Superpower | Shuttlecock Corner | Optaria

The National Stakes is a Listed flat horse race in Great Britain open to horses aged two years old. It is run at Sandown Park over a distance of 5 furlongs and 10 yards (1,015 metres), and it is scheduled to take place each year at the end of May.

The race was first run in 1889 and was known as the National Breeders' Produce Stakes until 1959. In 1932 it was "the most valuable two-year-old race on the English calendar".

Previous winners include Pretty Polly (1903), Cicero (1904), Neil Gow (1909), The Tetrarch (1913), Tetratema (1919), Tiffin (1928), Myrobella (1932), Tudor Minstrel (1946) and Belle of All (1950).

== Winners ==
| Year | Winner | Jockey | Trainer | Time |
|---|---|---|---|---|
| 1889 | Rathbeal |
| 1890 | Tittle Tattle |
| 1891 | Lady Caroline |
| 1892 | Tibble Shiels |
| 1893 | Delphos |
| 1894 | Saintly |
| 1895 | Elmsworth |
| 1896 | Chelandry | | William Walters Jr. |
| 1897 |
| 1898 | ch colt by Enthusiast-Noble Duchess | Weldon | William Elsey |
| 1899 | Democrat | Tod Sloan | John Huggins |
| 1900 (dh) | Ian; Star Shoot | Tod Sloan; Lester Reiff | Robert Sherwood Jr. John Huggins | 1:05.00 |
| 1901 | Game Chick | Lester Reiff | John Huggins | 1:02.40 |
| 1902 | Rabelais | Danny Maher | Richard Marsh | 1:02.80 |
| 1903 | Pretty Polly | | Peter Gilpin |
| 1904 | Cicero | Danny Maher | Percy Peck |
| 1905 | Sarcelle | Bernard Dillon | Fallon |
| 1906 | Traquair | Danny Maher | Percy Peck |
| 1907 | White Eagle | Barry Lynham | Jack Robinson |
| 1908 | Bayardo | Danny Maher | Alec Taylor Jr. | 1:04.80 |
| 1909 | Neil Gow | Danny Maher | Percy Peck | 1:06.00 |
| 1910 | Cellini | William Saxby | Peter Gilpin |
| 1911 | Mountain Mint (Note: Mountain Mint was unnamed as a 2-y-o and raced as 'Adula filly') | Walter Griggs | Peter Gilpin |
| 1912 | Prue | Albert Whalley | Willie Pratt |
| 1913 | The Tetrarch | Steve Donoghue | Atty Persse | 1:05.60 |
| 1914 | Redfern | Jim Clark | Alec Taylor Jr. | 1:04.20 |
| 1915-18 | No race |
| 1919 | Tetratema | Bernard Carslake | Atty Persse | 1:05.80 |
| 1920 | Polly Flinders | Skeets Martin | Peter Gilpin | 1:04.80 |
| 1921 | Polyhistor | Bernard Carslake | Etienne de Mestre | 1:03.40 |
| 1922 | Town Guard | George Archibald Sr. | Peter Gilpin | 1:04.00 |
| 1923 | Mumtaz Mahal | George Hulme | Richard Dawson | 1:01.60 |
| 1924 | Garden of Allah | George Archibald Sr. | Peter Gilpin | 1:03.80 |
| 1925 | Kate Coventry | Charlie Elliott | Peter Gilpin | 1:03.00 |
| 1926 | Priscilla | Charlie Elliott | Jack Jarvis | 1:02.00 |
| 1927 | Flamingo | Charlie Elliott | Jack Jarvis | 1:05.00 |
| 1928 | Tiffin | Gordon Richards | Fred Darling | 1:02.60 |
| 1929 | Queen of the Nore | Harry Beasley Jr. | Atty Persse | 1:02.80 |
| 1930 | Thyestes | Harry Beasley Jr. | Atty Persse | 1:04.80 |
| 1931 | Orwell (Note: Orwell was unnamed as a 2-y-o and raced as 'Golden Hair colt') | Bobby Jones | Joseph Lawson | 1:04.80 |
| 1932 | Myrobella | Gordon Richards | Fred Darling | 1:02.20 |
| 1933 | Colombo | Gordon Richards | Tommy Hogg | 1:02.40 |
| 1934 | Bahram | Richard Perryman | Frank Butters | 1:00.20 |
| 1935 | Wyndham (Note: Wyndham was unnamed as a 2-y-o and raced as 'Bossover colt') | Charlie Smirke | Captain Donald Snow | 1:04.40 |
| 1936 | Full Sail | Bobby Jones | Jack Jarvis | 1:03.60 |
| 1937 | Portmarnock | Rufus Beasley | Cecil Boyd-Rochfort | 1:02.60 |
| 1938 | Rogerstone Castle (Note: Rogerstone Castle was unnamed and raced as 'Apple Ring colt') | Charlie Elliott | Steve Donoghue | 1:04.60 |
| 1939 | Stardust (Note: In 1939 British Empire finished first, but was disqualified for crossing.) (Note: British Empire was unnamed as a 2-y-o and raced as 'Rose of England colt') | Charlie Smirke | Frank Butters | 1:03.80 |
| 1940-45 | No race |
| 1946 (Note: The 1946 race was run at Ascot) | Tudor Minstrel | Gordon Richards | Fred Darling | 1:02.60 |
| 1947 | The Cobbler | Gordon Richards | Fred Darling | 1:04.60 |
| 1948 | Abernant | Gordon Richards | Noel Murless | 1:03.20 |
| 1949 | Palestine | Charlie Smirke | Frank Butters | 1:04.00 |
| 1950 | Belle of All | George Younger | Norman Bertie | 1:02.40 |
| 1951 | Constantia | Peter Maher | Ryan Jarvis | 1:03.40 |
| 1952 | Bebe Grande | Willie Snaith | Sam Armstrong | 1:03.80 |
| 1953 | Tudor Honey | Manny Mercer | Jack Jarvis | 1:02.80 |
| 1954 | Courageous | Frank Barlow | Humphrey Cottrill | 1:02.40 |
| 1955 | Rustam | Doug Smith | Geoffrey Brooke | 1:01.80 |
| 1956 | Military Law | Joe Mercer | Jack Waugh | 1:01.60 |
| 1957 | Promulgation | Eph Smith | Ted Leader | 1:06.00 |
| 1958 | Captain Kidd | Manny Mercer | Jack Jarvis | 1:02.60 |
| 1959 | Sing Sing | Doug Smith | Jack Watts | 1:00.40 |
| 1960 | Kerrabee | Scobie Breasley | Staff Ingham | 1:02.20 |
| 1961 | Display | Ron Hutchinson | Paddy Prendergast | 1:01.60 |
| 1962 | Whistling Wind | Garnet Bougoure | Paddy Prendergast | 1:02.00 |
| 1963 | Pourparler | Garnet Bougoure | Paddy Prendergast | 1:02.20 |
| 1964 | Double Jump | Jimmy Lindley | Jeremy Tree | 1:02.20 |
| 1965 | Zahedan | Lester Piggott | Noel Murless | 1:01.20 |
| 1966 | Falcon | Lester Piggott | Fulke Johnson Houghton | 1:02.20 |
| 1967 | Sovereign | Ron Hutchinson | Harry Wragg | 1:02.00 |
| 1968 | Tower Walk | Taffy Thomas | Geoffrey Barling | 1:01.60 |
| 1969 | Quarryknowe | Tony Murray | Ryan Price | 1:01.60 |
| 1970 | Trasi Girl | Willie Carson | Barry Hills | 1:02.20 |
| 1971 | Stilvi | Geoff Lewis | Bruce Hobbs | 1:02.30 |
| 1972 | Hunters Path | Bill Williamson | Michael Jarvis | 1:03.80 |
| 1973 (Note: The 1973 race was run at Kempton Park) | Daring Boy | Eddie Hide | Arthur Budgett | 1:00.73 |
| 1974 | Streak | Willie Carson | John Sutcliffe | 1:03.99 |
| 1976 | Piney Ridge | Lester Piggott | Mick Kauntze | 1:02.60 |
| 1977 | Noiritza | Pat Eddery | Mick O'Toole | 1:02.93 |
| 1978 | Schweppeshire Lad | Greville Starkey | Michael Stoute | 1:02.14 |
| 1979 | Rollahead | Joe Mercer | Jeremy Hindley | 1:02.53 |
| 1980 | Penmarric | Greville Starkey | Gavin Hunter | 1:02.20 |
| 1981 | Abandoned due to waterlogging |
| 1982 | Krayyan | Greville Starkey | Gavin Hunter | 1:00.92 |
| 1983 | Precocious | Lester Piggott | Henry Cecil | 1:03.34 |
| 1984 | Primo Dominie | John Reid | Brian Swift | 1:01.47 |
| 1985 | Moonlight Lady | Pat Eddery | Paul Kelleway | 1:04.37 |
| 1986 | Risk Me | Pat Eddery | Paul Kelleway | 1:02.75 |
| 1987 | Tricky Note | Michael Hills | William Haggas | 1:01.18 |
| 1988 | Superpower | Tony Ives | Bill O'Gorman | 1:03.22 |
| 1989 | Princess Taufan | Ray Cochrane | Dr Jon Scargill | 1:00.47 |
| 1990 | Balwa | Willie Carson | Alex Scott | 1:02.15 |
| 1991 | Marling | Gary Carter | Geoff Wragg | 1:01.59 |
| 1992 | Lyric Fantasy | Michael Roberts | Richard Hannon Sr. | 0:59.62 |
| 1993 | Redoubtable | Richard Quinn | Richard Hannon Sr. | 1:00.95 |
| 1994 | Signs | Pat Eddery | Richard Hannon Sr. | 1:03.14 |
| 1995 | Amaretto Bay | Mick Kinane | Brian Meehan | 1:03.54 |
| 1996 | Deadly Dudley | Mick Kinane | Richard Hannon Sr. | 1:01.83 |
| 1997 | Pool Music | Richard Hughes | Richard Hannon Sr. | 1:00.72 |
| 1998 | Bint Allayl | Frankie Dettori | Mick Channon | 1:02.36 |
| 1999 | Rowaasi | Frankie Dettori | Mick Channon | 0:59.95 |
| 2000 | Taras Emperor | Jimmy Fortune | John Quinn | 1:05.89 |
| 2001 | Shiny | Philip Robinson | Clive Brittain | 1:02.72 |
| 2002 | Presto Vento | Dane O'Neill | Richard Hannon Sr. | 1:02.00 |
| 2003 | Russian Valour | Kevin Darley | Mark Johnston | 1:00.65 |
| 2004 | Polly Perkins | Kevin Darley | Nick Littmoden | 1:01.65 |
| 2005 | Salut d'Amour | Kieren Fallon | Jeremy Noseda | 1:02.33 |
| 2006 | Excellent Art | Frankie Dettori | Neville Callaghan | 1:06.49 |
| 2007 | Sweepstake | Richard Hughes | Richard Hannon Sr. | 1:02.72 |
| 2008 | Icesolator | Richard Hughes | Richard Hannon Sr. | 1:04.89 |
| 2009 | Monsieur Chevalier | Richard Hughes | Richard Hannon Sr. | 1:00.83 |
| 2010 | Dinkum Diamond | Dane O'Neill | Henry Candy | 1:01.88 |
| 2011 | Pyman's Theory | Richard Kingscote | Tom Dascombe | 1:02.55 |
| 2012 | Sir Prancealot | Richard Hughes | Richard Hannon Sr. | 1:01.85 |
| 2013 | Rizeena | Ryan Moore | Clive Brittain | 1:03.57 |
| 2014 | Tiggy Wiggy | Richard Hughes | Richard Hannon Jr. | 1:03.92 |
| 2015 | King Of Rooks | Richard Hughes | Richard Hannon Jr. | 1:01.30 |
| 2016 | Global Applause | Ryan Moore | Ed Dunlop | 1:01.17 |
| 2017 | Havana Grey | P. J. McDonald | Karl Burke | 0:59.93 |
| 2018 | Vintage Brut | David Allan | Tim Easterby | 1:02.50 |
| 2019 | Flippa The Strippa | Silvestre de Sousa | Charles Hills | 1:00.85 |
| 2020 | Ubettabelieveit | Oisin Murphy | Nigel Tinkler | 1:01.65 |
| 2021 | Ebro River | James Doyle | Hugo Palmer | 1:05.24 |
| 2022 | Maria Branwell | Daniel Tudhope | David O'Meara | 1:02.79 |
| 2023 | Elite Status | Clifford Lee | Karl Burke | 1:00.48 |
| 2024 | Enchanting Empress | David Egan | Dominic Ffrench Davis | 1:05.60 |
| 2025 | Anthelia | Lewis Edmunds | Rod Millman | 1:03.18 |
| 2026 | Where Love Lives | Kevin Stott | Kevin Ryan | 1:02.33 |

== 1948 Race Abernant v Star King ==
Abernant was the a dominant sprinter who went on to achieve champion status in 1949 and 1950. As a two-year-old in 1948 he was top of the Free Handicap. Abernant was only once on the stretch and that was in a fantastic race for the National Breeders Produce Stakes at Sandown on 17 July. His main opponent was Star King. The 1948 edition of The Bloodstock Breeders Review provided the following wonderful account written by James Park of the race.

"Star King had won three races in runaway fashion. He had not been engaged at Ascot... Star King's jockey Sam Wragg after a gallop said "Abernant may be a good one, but he will have to hop along". I should say there was something more than quiet confidence behind Star King. Each had earned the maximum penalty and were meeting at level weights.

When the tapes went up off went Star King. Abernant followed at an interval of perhaps three lengths. The others dribbled out of the gate, so that by the time half a furlong had been covered there were many lengths between Star King and the hindmost member of the party. The uphill course at Sandown is not one on which waiting tactics can be employed successfully. So I was rather surprised when Gordon Richards (Abernant's jockey) pretty well sat on Star King's tail without making any attempt to join issue. The leader was slipping along while still on the bit. Gordon, on Abernant, had what is known as a double handful. It was after covering three furlongs that Gordon set Abernant alight. He soon went past Star King and it looked all over bar the shouting. But drama was to follow. Star King had never even been shown the whip in previous races. It had not been necessary. It electrified him to such an extent he suddenly became jet propelled. By that time Abernant had gained probably a length lead. Quick to sense the situation, out came Gordon's whip. The response was not quite the same. Instead of gaining further ground, Abernant began to edge over to the right. Star King kept a perfectly true line. Up he crept, and 100 yards from the winning post he was still gaining. It was anybody's race as they went past the post, with Star King definitely going the stronger. The judge promptly ruled that Abernant had retained sufficient of his lead to win by the shortest of short heads. (There was no photo finish at Sandown at the time) James Park went on to write I am old enough to know better than to argue with the judge. He is the one person in a position to give an opinion. Sam Wragg thought he had won and he was not the only one.

Mr Wilfred Harvey, the owner of Star King, took it well. "I hope they can meet again over 6 furlongs" he said. They did not do so. The controversy raged throughout the season, and no doubt continued during the winter. There was the usual inquest. Noel Murless ... told me that in home gallops Abernant had been ridden from behind, and had always produced a brilliant burst of speed in the last 100 yards or so. That was why it was decided to adopt similar tactics at Sandown.

In the Free Handicap at the end of the year Abernant was allocated 9st 7lb and Star King was second on the list at 9st 5lb. Timeform, in its first Annual that rated all horses, gave Abernant 133 and Star King 131 rating.

== See also ==
- Horse racing in Great Britain
- List of British flat horse races
