= Myrobella =

Irish-bred Thoroughbred racehorse

- Sire: Tetratema
- Grandsire: The Tetrarch
- Dam: Dolabella
- Damsire: White Eagle
- Sex: Mare
- Foaled: 1930
- Country: Ireland
- Colour: Grey
- Breeder: National Stud
- Owner: 5th Earl of Lonsdale
- Trainer: Fred Darling
- Record: 13: 10–2–1

Major wins
- National Breeders' Produce Stakes (1932); Champagne Stakes (1932); Boscawen Stakes (1932); Prendergast Stakes (1932); Fern Hill Stakes (1933); July Cup (1933); King George Stakes (1933); Challenge Stakes (1933)

Awards
- Top-rated British two-year-old (1932)

Myrobella (foaled 1930) was an Irish-bred, British-trained Thoroughbred racehorse and broodmare. Bred by the British National Stud she was the outstanding two-year-old of either sex in Britain in 1932 when she won five consecutive races. In the following year she failed to stay the distance in the 1000 Guineas but had considerable success when reverting to sprint distances, winning the July Cup, King George Stakes and Challenge Stakes. On her retirement from racing she became a successful and influential broodmare.

== Background ==
Myrobella was a powerfully-built grey mare bred by the Irish branch of the National Stud in Tully, County Kildare. She inherited her grey colour from her sire Tetratema, the leading British two-year-old of 1919 who went on to win the 2000 Guineas and many important sprint races. As a stallion, Tetratema sired many good sprinters and milers including the unbeaten Tiffin and was the British champion sire in 1929. Myrobella's dam, Dolabella, produced six other winners and was a daughter of the outstanding broodmare Gondolette, whose other descendants included Hyperion, Sickle, Sansovino, Entrepreneur, Might and Power and Sariska.

The National Stud leased Myrobella to Hugh Lowther, 5th Earl of Lonsdale for her racing career. She was sent into training with Fred Darling at his stables at Beckhampton in Wiltshire.

== Racing career ==
=== 1932: two-year-old season ===
Myrobella began her racing career at Salisbury Racecourse in the spring of 1929, finishing second on her debut and then winning a maiden race. She won her next four races, competing against colts on each occasion. In July she contested the most valuable two-year-old race of the year, the £6953 National Breeders' Produce Stakes over five furlongs at Sandown Park Racecourse. Ridden by the champion jockey Gordon Richards, she displayed "wonderful speed" in the early stages and built an unassailable lead to win very easily: according to the Sporting Life, Richards only had to sit still and wait till the winning post was passed. In September she moved up in distance for the Champagne Stakes over six furlongs at Doncaster. She started the 11/8 favourite and won by six lengths from the colt Coroado. Myrobella ended her season at Newmarket Racecourse in autumn, winning the Boscawen Stakes and the Prendergast Stakes. In the latter event, run on 14 October Myrobella's victory led to a failure of the totaliser betting system: as almost all the tickets on the race had been bought for Myrobella, the Tote sustained a £232 loss on the race.

In the Free Handicap, a rating of the best two-year-olds to race in Britain, Myrobella was given top weight of 133 pounds. In a year dominated by fillies, she was followed in the rankings by the Molecomb Stakes winner Betty (130) and the Cheveley Park Stakes winner Brown Betty (127). The leading colt was Manitoba on 126, a pound ahead of Hyperion. Contemporary commentators rated Myrobella the equal of the "flying filly" Mumtaz Mahal and superior to the undefeated Tiffin. She was described in the Sporting Life as "a streak of lightning that has paralysed all her opponents". Her earnings for the season on £11,525 placed her fourth on the list of the most financially successful horses behind Firdaussi, Udaipur and Miracle.

=== 1933: three-year-old season ===
On her three-year-old debut in April, Myrobella reverted to the minimum distance of five furlongs and won the Severeals Stakes at Newmarket in April. She was then moved up in distance to contest the 117th running of the 1000 Guineas over Newmarket's Rowley Mile course on 29 April. She failed to stay the distance and finished third of the twenty-two runners, beaten half a length and three quarters of a length by Brown Betty and Fur Tor.

Myrobella then reverted to sprinting, and won the Fern Hill Stakes over five furlongs at Royal Ascot in June. She then won the July Cup at Newmarket and the King George Stakes at Goodwood Racecourse, beating the five-year-old Concerto on both occasions. At York Racecourse in August, she was beaten a short head by Concerto in the Nunthorpe Stakes, with Gold Bridge a neck away in third place. Myrobella ended her racing career in October, when she won the Challenge Stakes over six furlongs at Newmarket.

== Assessment ==
As noted above, Myrobella was rated the best two-year-old of either sex to race in Britain in 1932. In their book A Century of Champions, based on a modified version of the Timeform system John Randall and Tony Morris rated Myrobella the fifth best two-year-old filly of the 20th century trained in Britain or Ireland, behind Pretty Polly, Mumtaz Mahal, Sun Chariot and Cawston's Pride.

== Stud record ==
Myrobella was retired from racing to become a broodmare and had considerable success. In 1936, she produced a grey filly sired by Cameronian named Belle of Ascot, whose descendants included Linamix, a colt who won the Poule d'Essai des Poulains and sired the Prix de l'Arc de Triomphe winner Sagamix. Myrobella's next foal was Snowberry (also by Cameronian), who won the Queen Mary Stakes and produced the St Leger winner Chamossaire as well as Ariana, the grand-dam of the Derby winner Snow Knight. Myrobella's best offspring was Big Game a colt sired by Bahram. Foaled in 1939, Big Game was the best British colt of his generation, winning the 2000 Guineas and the Champion Stakes before becoming a successful breeding stallion.

== Pedigree ==
Pedigree of Myrobella (GB), grey mare, 1930
Sire Tetratema (GB) 1917	The Tetrarch (IRE); 1911	Roi Herode	Le Samaritain
Sire Tetratema (GB) 1917	The Tetrarch (IRE); 1911	Roi Herode	Roxelane
Sire Tetratema (GB) 1917	The Tetrarch (IRE); 1911	Vahren	Bona Vista
Sire Tetratema (GB) 1917	The Tetrarch (IRE); 1911	Vahren	Castania
Sire Tetratema (GB) 1917	Scotch Gift (GB); 1907	Symington	Ayrshire
Sire Tetratema (GB) 1917	Scotch Gift (GB); 1907	Symington	Tarporley
Sire Tetratema (GB) 1917	Scotch Gift (GB); 1907	Maund	Ianthe
Sire Tetratema (GB) 1917	Scotch Gift (GB); 1907	Maund	Sandal
Dam Dolabella (IRE) 1911	White Eagle (GB); 1905	Gallinule	Isonomy
Dam Dolabella (IRE) 1911	White Eagle (GB); 1905	Gallinule	Moorhen
Dam Dolabella (IRE) 1911	White Eagle (GB); 1905	Merry Gal	Galopin
Dam Dolabella (IRE) 1911	White Eagle (GB); 1905	Merry Gal	Mary Seaton
Dam Dolabella (IRE) 1911	Gondolette (GB); 1902	Loved One	See Saw
Dam Dolabella (IRE) 1911	Gondolette (GB); 1902	Loved One	Pilgrimage
Dam Dolabella (IRE) 1911	Gondolette (GB); 1902	Dongola	Doncaster
Dam Dolabella (IRE) 1911	Gondolette (GB); 1902	Dongola	Douranee (Family: 6-e)
