= July Stakes =

Flat horse race in Britain

- Class: Group 2
- Location: July Course; Newmarket, England
- Inaugurated: 1786; 240 years ago
- Race type: Flat / Thoroughbred
- Sponsor: Tattersalls
- Website: Newmarket

Race information
- Distance: 6f (1,207 metres)
- Surface: Turf
- Track: Straight
- Qualification: Two-year-old colts and geldings
- Weight: 9 st 0 lb Penalties; 3 lb for G1 / G2 winners
- Purse: £100,000 (2022); 1st: £56,710

July Stakes
2026
Inner City Blues	Adaay Of Scarlett	Hickory Lad

Previous years
2025
Zavateri	Do Or Do Not	Jel Pepper
2024
Whistlejacket	Billboard Star	Aomori City
2023
Jasour	Lake Forest	Toca Madera
2022
Persian Force	Show Respect	Mysterious Night
2021
Lusail	Asymmetric	Sam Maximus

2020-2011
2020
Tactical	Yazaman	Escape Route
2019
Royal Lytham	Platinum Star	Visinari
2018
Advertise	Konchek	Charming Kid
2016
Mehmas	Intelligence Cross	Broken Stones
2015
Shalaa	Steady Pace	Elronaq
2014
Ivawood	Jungle Cat	Muhaarar
2013
Anjaal	Figure Of Speech	Jallota
2012
Alhebayeb	Lewisham	Ahern
2011
Frederick Engels	Roman Soldier	Bannock

2010-2001
2010
Libranno	Neebras	Elzaam
2009
Arcano	Orpen Grey	Red Jazz
2008
Classic Blade	Sayif	Prolific
2007
Winker Watson	River Proud	Swiss Franc
2006
Strategic Prince	Armigerent	Dubai's Touch
2005
Ivan Denisovich	Northern Empire	Black Charmer
2004
Captain Hurricane	Council Member	Mystical Land
2003
Nevisian Lad	Cape Fear	Byron
2002
Mister Links	Tacitus	The Bonus King
2001
Meshaheer	Scottish River	Prince Dayjur

2000-1991
2000
Noverre	Media Mogul	Bram Stoker
1999
City On A Hill	Mull Of Kintyre	Red Pepper
1998
Bertolini	El Tango	Black Amber
1997
Bold Fact	Linden Heights	Pool Music
1996
Rich Ground	Juwwi	Air Express
1995
Tagula	Take A Left	World Premier
1994
Fallow	Zeb	Munguy
1993
First Trump	Fast Eddy	Prince Babar
1992
Wharf	Canaska Star	Pips Pride
1991
Showbrook	Made Of Gold	Wilde Rufo

1990-1988
1990
Mujtahid	Mac's Imp	The Old Firm
1989
Rock City	Champagne Gold	Wadood
1988
Always Valiant	Frequent Flyer	Dancing Dissident

The July Stakes is a Group 2 flat horse race in Great Britain open to two-year-old colts and geldings. It is run on the July Course at Newmarket over a distance of 6 furlongs (1,207 metres), and it is scheduled to take place each year in July.

== History ==
The July Stakes is the oldest surviving event for two-year-olds in the British flat racing calendar. It was established in 1786, and it was originally open to horses of either gender. The conditions initially stipulated that those horses sired by Eclipse or Highflyer should carry an additional weight of three pounds.

The present system of race grading was introduced in 1971, and for a period the July Stakes was classed at Group 3 level. The event was restricted to colts and geldings in 1977, and it was promoted to Group 2 status in 2003.

The July Stakes is currently held on the opening day of Newmarket's three-day July Festival meeting. The equivalent race for fillies is the Duchess of Cambridge Stakes.

== Records ==
Leading jockey (6 wins):

- George Fordham – Tolurno (1861), Robin Hood (1865), Lady Elizabeth (1867), Ecossais (1873), Levant (1875), Ruperra (1878)
- Sir Gordon Richards – Hilla (1934), High Sheriff (1944), Rivaz (1945), Masaka (1947), Diableretta (1949), Tamerlane (1954)

Leading trainer (7 wins):

- Frank Butters – Fairway (1927), Alishah (1933), Hilla (1934), Mirza II (1937), Rivaz (1945), Masaka (1947), Diableretta (1949)

== Winners since 1900 ==
Year	Winner	Jockey	Trainer	Time
1900 (dh)	Doricles; Veles	Tommy Loates; Skeets Martin	Alfred Hayhoe *
1901	Sceptre	Sam Loates	Charles Morton
1902	Hammerkop	Skeets Martin		1:11.00
1903	Montem
1904	Cicero	Danny Maher	Percy Peck
1905	Gorgos	Herbert Jones	Richard Marsh
1906	Traquair	Danny Maher	Percy Peck
1907	Pearl Of The Loch	Herbert Jones	Richard Marsh	1:10.60
1908	Battle-Axe	Bernard Dillon	Davies	1:10.80
1909	Prince Rupert	William Saxby	Atty Persse
1910	St Anton	Danny Maher	John Watson
1911	White Star	Walter Griggs	Charles Morton
1912	Rock Flint	Danny Maher	George Blackwell	1:07.60
1913	Ambassador	Danny Maher	Reginald Day
1914	Roseland	Steve Donoghue	Atty Persse	1:09.60
1915	Figaro	Walter Griggs	Peter Gilpin
1916	Grand Fleet	Joe Childs	Etienne De Mestre
	no race 1917
1918	Buchan	Jack Colling	Alec Taylor Jr.
1919	Sarchedon	Skeets Martin	Peter Gilpin	1:11.20
1920	Monarch	Frank Bullock	Bob Sievier	1:10.20
1921	Lembach	Frank Bullock	Reginald Day	1:09.80
1922	Legality	George Hulme	Richard Dawson
1923	Diophon	George Hulme	Richard Dawson	1:07.00
1924	Runnymede	George Archibald Sr.	Richard Marsh	1:10.20
1925	Apple Sammy	Henri Jelliss	Basil Jarvis
1926	The Satrap	Harry Beasley Jr.	Atty Persse	1:11.00
1927	Fairway	Tommy Weston	Frank Butters
1928	Mr Jinks	Harry Beasley Jr.	Atty Persse	1:08.00
1929	Teacup	Michael Beary	Richard Dawson	1:11.00
1930	Four Course	Freddie Fox	Fred Darling	1:11.40
1931	Riot	Freddie Fox	Fred Darling	1:07.60
1932	Colorow	Tommy Weston	George Lambton	1:09.40
1933	Alishah	Michael Beary	Frank Butters	1:13.80
1934	Hilla	Gordon Richards	Frank Butters	1:13.80
1935	Daytona	Eph Smith	Jack Jarvis	1:10.00
1936	Foray	Rufus Beasley	Cecil Boyd-Rochfort	1:09.80
1937	Mirza II	Charlie Smirke	Frank Butters	1:07.60
1938	Prometheus	Richard Perryman	Ted Leader	1:10.40
1939	British Empire (Note: British Empire was unnamed as a 2-y-o and raced as Rose of England colt.)	Tommy Lowrey	Basil Jarvis	1:08.20
	no race 1940
1941	Ujiji	Michael Beary	Joseph Lawson	1:07.80
	no race 1942-43
1944 (Note: The 1944 running took place at Windsor)	High Sheriff	Gordon Richards	Fred Darling	1:13.60
1945	Rivaz	Gordon Richards	Frank Butters	0:59.80
1946	Miss Stripes	Eph Smith	Henri Jelliss	1:03.60
1947	Masaka	Gordon Richards	Frank Butters	1:10.80
1948	Nimbus	Charlie Elliott	George Colling	1:08.00
1949	Diableretta	Gordon Richards	Frank Butters	1:11.00
1950	Big Dipper	Harry Carr	Cecil Boyd-Rochfort	1:00.40
1951	Bob Major	Bill Rickaby	Jack Jarvis	1:00.80
1952	Empire Honey	Manny Mercer	Jack Jarvis	1:02.40
1953	Darius	Manny Mercer	Harry Wragg	1:01.93
1954	Tamerlane	Sir Gordon Richards	Norman Bertie	1:00.82
1955	Edmundo	Scobie Breasley	Norman Bertie	1:01.43
1956	Earl Marshal	Manny Mercer	Jack Jarvis	1:01.10
1957	Abelia	Lester Piggott	Noel Murless	1:01.88
1958	Greek Sovereign	Scobie Breasley	R Read	1:03.87
1959	Sound Track	Bill Rickaby	William Smyth	0:59.19
1960	Favorita	Lester Piggott	Noel Murless	0:59.86
1961	Burning Thoughts	Harry Carr	Dick Hern	1:14.16
1962	Romantic	Scobie Breasley	Noel Murless	1:13.42
1963	Endless Honey	Ron Hutchinson	Jack Jarvis	1:14.00
1964	Ragtime	Ron Hutchinson	Gordon Smyth	1:14.43
1965	Sky Gipsy	Ron Hutchinson	Gordon Smyth	1:14.72
1966	Golden Horus	Lester Piggott	Bill O'Gorman	1:14.07
1967	Lorenzaccio	George Moore	Noel Murless	1:16.16
1968	Burglar	Ron Hutchinson	John Dunlop	1:17.84
1969	Huntercombe	Sandy Barclay	Arthur Budgett	1:16.60
1970	Swing Easy	Lester Piggott	Jeremy Tree	1:17.10
1971	Deep Diver	Frankie Durr	Paul Davey	1:16.71
1972	Perdu	Jimmy Lindley	Atty Corbett	1:16.08
1973	Dragonara Palace	Lester Piggott	Barry Hills	1:15.42
1974	Auction Ring	Joe Mercer	Dick Hern	1:13.84
1975	Super Cavalier	Paul Cook	Gavin Hunter	1:13.87
1976	Skyship	Joe Mercer	Dick Hern	1:14.97
1977	Royal Harmony	Geoff Lewis	Bruce Hobbs	1:13.01
1978	Main Reef	Joe Mercer	Henry Cecil	1:14.82
1979	Final Straw	Paul Cook	Michael Stoute	1:13.09
1980	Age Quod Agis	Joe Mercer	Henry Cecil	1:16.04
1981	End of the Line	Steve Cauthen	Barry Hills	1:14.83
1982	Horage	Pat Eddery	Matt McCormack	1:13.11
1983	Superlative	Tony Ives	Bill O'Gorman	1:15.70
1984	Primo Dominie	John Reid	Brian Swift	1:14.14
1985	Green Desert	Walter Swinburn	Michael Stoute	1:11.92
1986	Mansooj	Cash Asmussen	Neville Callaghan	1:12.90
1987	Sanquirico	Steve Cauthen	Henry Cecil	1:11.79
1988	Always Valiant	Willie Carson	Neville Callaghan	1:16.97
1989	Rock City	Willie Carson	Richard Hannon Sr.	1:12.29
1990	Mujtahid	Willie Carson	Robert Armstrong	1:10.61
1991	Showbrook	Bruce Raymond	Richard Hannon Sr.	1:14.16
1992	Wharf	Pat Eddery	Henry Cecil	1:13.49
1993	First Trump	Michael Hills	Geoff Wragg	1:12.97
1994	Fallow	Frankie Dettori	David Loder	1:12.73
1995	Tagula	Walter Swinburn	Ian Balding	1:11.83
1996	Rich Ground	John Reid	James Bethell	1:12.04
1997	Bold Fact	Kieren Fallon	Henry Cecil	1:12.64
1998	Bertolini	Frankie Dettori	John Gosden	1:12.16
1999	City on a Hill	Sylvain Guillot	David Loder	1:10.70
2000	Noverre	Jimmy Fortune	David Loder	1:13.06
2001	Meshaheer	Frankie Dettori	David Loder	1:11.89
2002	Mister Links	Richard Hughes	Richard Hannon Sr.	1:14.28
2003	Nevisian Lad	Kieren Fallon	Michael Bell	1:12.39
2004	Captain Hurricane	Jimmy Fortune	Peter Chapple-Hyam	1:13.61
2005	Ivan Denisovich	Kieren Fallon	Aidan O'Brien	1:12.42
2006	Strategic Prince	Eddie Ahern	Paul Cole	1:12.15
2007	Winker Watson	Jimmy Fortune	Peter Chapple-Hyam	1:11.56
2008	Classic Blade	Richard Kingscote	Tom Dascombe	1:13.21
2009	Arcano	Martin Dwyer	Brian Meehan	1:10.53
2010	Libranno	Ryan Moore	Richard Hannon Sr.	1:11.37
2011	Frederick Engels	Eddie Ahern	David Brown	1:13.76
2012	Alhebayeb	Paul Hanagan	Richard Hannon Sr.	1:14.39
2013	Anjaal	Paul Hanagan	Richard Hannon Sr.	1:11.21
2014	Ivawood	Richard Hughes	Richard Hannon Jr.	1:11.02
2015	Shalaa	Robert Havlin	John Gosden	1:11.19
2016	Mehmas	Frankie Dettori	Richard Hannon Jr.	1:10.92
2017	Cardsharp	James Doyle	Mark Johnston	1:11.75
2018	Advertise	Frankie Dettori	Martyn Meade	1:11.63
2019	Royal Lytham	Wayne Lordan	Aidan O'Brien	1:11.16
2020	Tactical	William Buick	Andrew Balding	1:12.42
2021	Lusail	Pat Dobbs	Richard Hannon Jr.	1:10.57
2022	Persian Force	Rossa Ryan	Richard Hannon Jr.	1:11.18
2023	Jasour	Jim Crowley	Clive Cox	1:11.11
2024	Whistlejacket	Ryan Moore	Aidan O'Brien	1:12.17
2025	Zavateri	Charles Bishop	Eve Johnson Houghton	1:10.80
2026	Inner City Blues	William Buick	Charlie Appleby	1:11.35

== Earlier winners ==
- 1786: Bullfinch
- 1787: Jubilator
- 1788: Seagull
- 1789: Ostrich
- 1790: filly by Saltram
- 1791: Trumpetta
- 1792: Cymbeline
- 1793: filly by Trumpator
- 1794: colt by Volunteer
- 1795: colt by Anvil
- 1796: Emigrant
- 1797: Young Spear
- 1798: Vivaldi
- 1799: Skyrocket
- 1800: Flambeau
- 1801: Julia
- 1802: Duckling
- 1803: Ringtail
- 1804: Newmarket
- 1805: Pantaloon
- 1806: Little Sally
- 1807: Susan
- 1808: Spindle
- 1809: Cambric
- 1810: Joke
- 1811: Cato
- 1812: July
- 1813: Vittoria
- 1814: Minuet
- 1815: Belvoirina
- 1816: Merrymaker
- 1817: Loo
- 1818: Miracle
- 1819: Caroline
- 1820: Gustavus
- 1821: The Stag
- 1822: Palais Royal
- 1823: Reformer
- 1824: Red Gauntlet
- 1825: Crusader
- 1826: Tom Thumb
- 1827: Scribe
- 1828: Green Mantle
- 1829: The Mummer
- 1830: Zany
- 1831: Beiram
- 1832: Forester
- 1833: Zulima
- 1834: Kate Kearney
- 1835: The Athenian
- 1836: Armenia
- 1837: Mecca
- 1838: Bulwark
- 1839: Crucifix
- 1840: Yorkshire Lad
- 1841: Chatham
- 1842: Extempore
- 1843: Orlando
- 1844: Old England
- 1845: Queen Anne
- 1846: Miami
- 1847: Iodine
- 1848: The Flying Dutchman
- 1849: Sweetheart
- 1850: Grecian
- 1851: Hobbie Noble
- 1852: The Reiver
- 1853: Marsyas
- 1854: The Bonnie Morn
- 1855: Spindle
- 1856: Drumour
- 1857: Gin
- 1858: Cynricus
- 1859: Buccaneer
- 1860: Dictator
- 1861: Tolurno
- 1862: Saccharometer
- 1863: Cambuscan
- 1864: Liddington
- 1865: Robin Hood
- 1866: Achievement
- 1867: Lady Elizabeth
- 1868: Ryshworth
- 1869: Sunshine
- 1870: Hannah
- 1871: Sir Amyas
- 1872: Somerset
- 1873: Ecossais
- 1874: Camballo
- 1875: Levant
- 1876: Warren Hastings
- 1877: Strathfleet
- 1878: Ruperra
- 1879: Mask
- 1880: Bal Gal
- 1881: Kermesse
- 1882: Macheath
- 1883: Queen Adelaide
- 1884: Luminary
- 1885: Kendal
- 1886: Enterprise
- 1887: Friar's Balsam
- 1888: Donovan
- 1889: Loup
- 1890: Beauharnais
- 1891: Flyaway
- 1892: Milford
- 1893: Speed
- 1894: Kirkconnel
- 1895: Labrador
- 1896: Velasquez
- 1897: Mousme
- 1898: Desmond
- 1899: Captain Kettle

== See also ==
- Horse racing in Great Britain
- List of British flat horse races

References==

- Paris-Turf:
  - "1980"., "1982"., "1983"., "1984"., "1985"., "1986"., "1987".
- Racing Post:
  - 1988, 1989, 1990, 1991, 1992, 1993, 1994, 1995, 1996, 1997
  - 1998, 1999, 2000, 2001, 2002, 2003, 2004, 2005, 2006, 2007
  - 2008, 2009, 2010, 2011, 2012, 2013, 2014, 2015, 2016, 2017
  - 2018, 2019, 2020, 2021, 2022, 2023, 2025, 2026
- galopp-sieger.de – July Stakes.
- ifhaonline.org – International Federation of Horseracing Authorities – July Stakes (2019).
- pedigreequery.com – July Stakes – Newmarket.
- Abelson, Edward; John Tyrrel (1993). The Breedon Book of Horse Racing Records. Breedon Books. pp. 115–119. ISBN 1-873626-15-0.
