= King George Stakes =

Flat horse race in Britain

- Class: Group 2
- Location: Goodwood Racecourse; W. Sussex, England
- Inaugurated: 1911
- Race type: Flat / Thoroughbred
- Sponsor: Qatar
- Website: Goodwood

Race information
- Distance: 5f (1,006 metres)
- Surface: Turf
- Track: Straight
- Qualification: Three-years-old and up
- Weight: 9 st 1 lb (3yo); 9 st 4 lb (4yo+); Allowances; 3 lb for fillies and mares Penalties; 5 lb for Group 1 winners * 3 lb for Group 2 winners * * after 2024
- Purse: £300,000 (2025); 1st: £179,771

King George Stakes
2026
American Affair	Rumstar	Time For Sandals

Previous years
2025
Jm Jungle	She's Quality	Time For Sandals
2024
Big Evs	Asfoora	Believing
2023
Highfield Princess	White Lavender	Raasel
2022
Khaadem	Raasel	Caturra
2021
Suesa	Dragon Symbol	Glass Slippers

2020-2011
2020
Battaash	Glass Slippers	Ornate
2019
Battaash	Houtzen	Ornate
2018
Battaash	Take Cover	Muthmir
2017
Battaash	Profitable	Marsha
2016
Take Cover	Washington Dc	Goldream
2015
Muthmir	Take Cover	Move In Time
2014
Take Cover	Extortionist	Moviesta
2013
Moviesta	Swiss Spirit	Justineo
2012
Ortensia	Spirit Quartz	Masamah
2011
Masamah	Amour Propre	Group Therapy

2010-2001
2010
Borderlescott	Group Therapy	Astrophysical Jet
2009
Kingsgate Native	Total Gallery	Inxile
2008
Enticing	Masta Plasta	Dandy Man
2007
Moorhouse Lad	Enticing	Tax Free
2006
La Cucaracha	Desert Lord	Pivotal Flame
2005
Fire Up The Band	The Tatling	Moss Vale
2004
Ringmoor Down	Boogie Street	The Tatling
2003
The Tatling	Dragon Flyer	Slap Shot
2002
Agnetha	Rudi's Pet	Jessica's Dream
2001
Dietrich	Afaan	Eastern Purple

2000-1991
2000
Cassandra Go	Eastern Purple	Rudi's Pet
1999
Rudi's Pet	Imperial Beauty	Dashing Blue
1998
Land Of Dreams	Lady Alexander	Lochangel
1997
Averti	Cathedral	Indian Rocket
1996
Rambling Bear	Hever Golf Rose	Croft Pool
1995
Hever Golf Rose	Eveningperformance	Saint Express
1994
Lochsong	Mistertopogigo	Splice
1993
Lochsong	Paris House	Keen Hunter
1992
Freddie Lloyd	Blyton Lad	Artistic Reef
1991
Title Roll	Food Of Love	Rivers Rhapsody

1990-1981
1990
Argentum	Blyton Lad	Dancing Music
1989
Statoblest	Princess Athena	Carol's Treasure
1988
Silver Fling	Ever Sharp	Princess Athena
1987
Singing Steven	Carol's Treasure	Treasure Kay
1986
Double Schwartz	Gwydion	Rose of the Sea
1985
Primo Dominie	Prince Sabo	Prince Reymo
1984
Anita's Prince	Reesh	Jonacris
1983
Soba	Fine Edge	Chellaston Park
1982
Tina's Pet	Golden Green	Vaigly Star
1981
King of Spain	Welshwyn	Sayyaf

The King George Stakes is a Group 2 flat horse race in Great Britain open to horses aged three years or older. It is run at Goodwood over a distance of 5 furlongs (1,006 metres), and it is scheduled to take place each year in late July or early August.

== History ==
The event was established in 1911, and it was founded to commemorate the coronation of King George V. Initially it was run over a distance of 6 furlongs. The race distance was reduced to 5 furlongs from 1948.

The present system of race grading was introduced in 1971, and for a period the King George Stakes was classed at Group 3 level.

The car manufacturer Audi sponsored the race from 2005 to 2011, and for several years it was known as the Audi Stakes. It was sponsored by Gordon's Gin in 2012 and by Betfred since 2013. It was promoted to Group 2 status in 2010.

The King George Stakes is currently held on the fourth day of the five-day Glorious Goodwood meeting. The leading participants often go on to compete in the Nunthorpe Stakes, and the last to win both races in the same year was Battaash in 2019.

== Records ==
Most successful horse (4 wins):

- Battaash - 2017, 2018, 2019, 2020

Leading jockey (9 wins):

- Lester Piggott – Right Boy (1958, 1959), Matatina (1964), Pugnacity (1965), Raffingora (1970), Constans (1971), Valeriga (1980), Tina's Pet (1982), Anita's Prince (1984)

Leading trainer (5 wins):

- Charles Hills – Battaash (2017, 2018, 2019, 2020), Khaadem (2022)

== Winners ==
Year	Winner	Age	Jockey	Trainer	Time
1911	Spanish Prince	4	Frank Wootton	Charles Morton
1912	Golden Rod	6	Danny Maher	Samuel Pickering
1913	Hornet's Beauty	5	Skeets Martin	Felix Leach	1:11.60
1914	Harmonicon	4	Skeets Martin	Jack Joyner	1:12.80
	no race 1915–18
1919	Chiffre d'Amour	3	Brownie Carslake	Atty Persse	1:13.40
1920	Tetratema	3	Brownie Carslake	Atty Persse
1921	Tetratema	4	Brownie Carslake	Atty Persse	1:11.40
1922	Roman Bachelor	5	George Archibald Sr.	Peter Gilpin	1:14.40
1923	Sicyon	4	William McLachlan	Etienne De Mestre	1:14.00
1924	Mumtaz Mahal	3	George Archibald Sr.	Richard Dawson	1:13.00
1925	Diomedes	3	Jack Leach	Harvey Leader
1926	Oojah	4	Brownie Carslake	Charles Peck	1:13.00
1927	Endowment	3	Joseph Nolan	Fred Darling	1:14.60
1928	Queen's Bower	4	Freddie Fox	Richard Gooch	1:14.00
1929	Tiffin	3	Freddie Fox	Fred Darling	1:12.80
1930	Stingo	3	Cecil Ray	P Lowe	1:13.80
1931	Stingo	4	Cecil Ray	P Lowe	1:17.20
1932	Clustine	3	Harry Beasley Jr.	S Darling	1:16.80
1933	Myrobella	3	Gordon Richards	Fred Darling	1:12.60
1934	Old Riley	5	Joe Childs	Thomas Rintoul	1:12.60
1935	Strathcarron	6	Bobby Jones	Fred Winter Sr.	1:12.20
1936	Veuve Clicquot	3	Eph Smith	Jack Jarvis	1:14.60
1937	Veuve Clicquot	4	Eph Smith	Jack Jarvis	1:11.80
1938	Neuvy	3	Gordon Richards	Frank Butters	1:13.80
1939	Mickey The Greek	5	Harry Wragg	Henry Leach	1:12.00
	no race 1940
1941 (Note: The 1941 running took place at Newmarket)	Antecedent	6	Eph Smith	Jack Jarvis	1:13.80
	no race 1942–45
1946	Honeyway	5	Eph Smith	Jack Jarvis	1:18.00
1947	Daily Mail	4	Gordon Richards	Walter Nightingall	1:15.20
1948	Royal Barge	4	Gordon Richards	Percy Allden	0:58.80
1949	Abernant	3	Gordon Richards	Noel Murless	0:59.40
1950	Abernant	4	Gordon Richards	Noel Murless	1:00.60
1951	Bakshishi	3	Gordon Richards	Harry Wragg	1:00.80
1952	Royal Serenade	4	Gordon Richards	Harry Wragg	1:01.20
1953	Fairy Flax	4	Scobie Breasley	Joseph Lawson	1:00.40
1954	Four Of Spades	3	Rae Johnstone	George Beeby	1:03.80
1955	Democratic	3	Scobie Breasley	Paddy Prendergast	0:58.00
1956	Palariva	3	Roger Poincelet	Alec Head	1:02.00
1957	Refined	3	Doug Smith	Paddy Prendergast	0:59.00
1958	Right Boy	4	Lester Piggott	Bill Dutton	1:00.60
1959	Right Boy	5	Lester Piggott	Pat Rohan	0:58.80
1960	Bleep-Bleep	4	Harry Carr	Humphrey Cottrill	0:59.20
1961	Floribunda	3	Ron Hutchinson	Paddy Prendergast	1:00.40
1962	La Tendresse	3	Garnie Bougoure	Paddy Prendergast	0:58.80
1963	Secret Step	4	Scobie Breasley	Peter Hastings-Bass	0:57.80
1964	Matatina	4	Lester Piggott	Frank Armstrong	0:59.20
1965	Pugnacity	3	Lester Piggott	Walter Wharton	1:02.40
1966	Polyfoto	6	Brian Taylor	Eddie Reavey	0:59.00
1967	Right Strath	6	Joe Mercer	Walter Nightingall	0:59.20
1968	So Blessed	3	Frankie Durr	Michael Jarvis	1:00.20
1969	Laser Light	3	Ron Hutchinson	John Dunlop	0:59.40
1970	Raffingora	5	Lester Piggott	Bill Marshall	1:00.30
1971	Constans	6	Lester Piggott	Jeremy Tree	1:01.42
1972	Stilvi	3	John Gorton	Bruce Hobbs	0:57.73
1973	Sandford Lad	5	Tony Murray	Ryan Price	0:57.62
1974	Singing Bede	5	Geoff Baxter	Doug Marks	0:59.36
1975	Auction Ring	3	Joe Mercer	Dick Hern	0:58.99
1976	Music Boy	3	Greville Starkey	Brian Lunness	0:58.96
1977	Scarcely Blessed	3	Ron Hutchinson	Fulke Johnson Houghton	0:58.96
1978	Music Maestro	3	Greville Starkey	Michael Stoute	0:58.69
1979	Ahonoora	4	Greville Starkey	Frankie Durr	1:00.54
1980	Valeriga	4	Lester Piggott	Luca Cumani	0:59.00
1981	King of Spain	5	Paul Cook	Peter Cundell	0:58.56
1982	Tina's Pet	4	Lester Piggott	Geoff Huffer	0:56.92
1983	Soba	4	David Nicholls	David Chapman	0:57.23
1984	Anita's Prince	3	Lester Piggott	Richard Lister	0:58.72
1985	Primo Dominie	3	Walter Swinburn	Michael Stoute	0:59.45
1986	Double Schwartz	5	Pat Eddery	Charlie Nelson	0:58.93
1987	Singing Steven	3	Brian Rouse	Richard Hannon Sr.	0:58.60
1988	Silver Fling	3	Pat Eddery	Ian Balding	0:58.50
1989	Statoblest	3	Ray Cochrane	Luca Cumani	0:58.16
1990	Argentum	3	John Reid	Jack Holt	0:57.02
1991	Title Roll	3	Willie Carson	Tommy Stack	0:59.11
1992	Freddie Lloyd	3	John Reid	Neville Callaghan	0:57.88
1993	Lochsong	5	Frankie Dettori	Ian Balding	1:00.20
1994	Lochsong	6	Frankie Dettori	Ian Balding	0:57.36
1995	Hever Golf Rose	4	Jason Weaver	Joe Naughton	0:56.25
1996	Rambling Bear	3	Ray Cochrane	Michael Blanshard	0:57.98
1997	Averti	6	Kieren Fallon	Willie Muir	0:57.75
1998	Land of Dreams	3	Darryll Holland	Mark Johnston	0:58.13
1999	Rudi's Pet	5	Seb Sanders	David Nicholls	0:56.01
2000	Cassandra Go	4	Michael Roberts	Geoff Wragg	0:58.01
2001	Dietrich	3	Michael Kinane	Aidan O'Brien	0:57.78
2002	Agnetha	3	Michael Kinane	Dermot Weld	0:57.36
2003	The Tatling	6	Darryll Holland	Milton Bradley	0:58.19
2004	Ringmoor Down	5	Richard Quinn	David Arbuthnot	0:56.73
2005	Fire up the Band	6	Adrian Nicholls	David Nicholls	0:58.52
2006	La Cucaracha	5	Michael Hills	Barry Hills	0:56.83
2007	Moorhouse Lad	4	Ryan Moore	Bryan Smart	0:57.32
2008	Enticing	4	Johnny Murtagh	William Haggas	0:56.63
2009	Kingsgate Native	4	Ryan Moore	Sir Michael Stoute	0:57.96
2010	Borderlescott	8	Kieren Fallon	Robin Bastiman	0:57.22
2011	Masamah	5	Jamie Spencer	Kevin Ryan	0:56.67
2012	Ortensia	7	William Buick	Paul Messara	0:57.24
2013	Moviesta	3	Paul Mulrennan	Bryan Smart	0:56.72
2014	Take Cover	7	Andrea Atzeni	David Griffiths	0:56.47
2015	Muthmir	5	Paul Hanagan	William Haggas	0:56.08
2016	Take Cover	9	David Allan	David Griffiths	0:56.86
2017	Battaash	3	Jim Crowley	Charles Hills	0:58.51
2018	Battaash	4	Jim Crowley	Charles Hills	0:56.50
2019	Battaash	5	Jim Crowley	Charles Hills	0:56.20
2020	Battaash	6	Jim Crowley	Charles Hills	0:55.62
2021	Suesa	3	William Buick	Francois Rohaut	0:59.35
2022	Khaadem	6	Ryan Moore	Charles Hills	0:56.46
2023	Highfield Princess	6	Jason Hart	John Quinn	0:58.92
2024	Big Evs	3	Tom Marquand	Michael Appleby	0:56.62
2025	Jm Jungle	5	Jason Hart	John & Sean Quinn	0:57.57
2026	American Affair	6	Paul Mulrennan	Jim Goldie	0:55.68

== See also ==
- Horse racing in Great Britain
- List of British flat horse races
