= Norfolk Stakes (Great Britain) =

Flat horse race in Britain

- Class: Group 2
- Location: Ascot Racecourse; Ascot, England
- Inaugurated: 1843
- Race type: Flat / Thoroughbred
- Website: Ascot

Race information
- Distance: 5f (1,006 metres)
- Surface: Turf
- Track: Straight
- Qualification: Two-year-olds
- Weight: 9 st 3 lb Allowances; 3 lb for fillies
- Purse: £150,000 (2025); 1st: £85,065

Norfolk Stakes
2026
Orthodox	El Floridita	Mussab

Previous years
2025
Charles Darwin	Wise Approach	Sandal's Song
2024
Shareholder	Tropical Storm	Arizona Blaze
2023
Valiant Force	Malc	Elite Status
2022
The Ridler	Walbank	Crispy Cat
2021
Perfect Power	Go Bears Go	Project Dante

2020-2011
2020
The Lir Jet	Golden Pal	Imperial Force
2019
A'ali	Ventura Rebel	Dubai Station
2018
Shang Shang Shang	Pocket Dynamo	Land Force
2017
Sioux Nation	Santry	Cardsharp
2016
Prince Of Lir	The Last Lion	Silver Line
2015
Waterloo Bridge	Log Out Island	King Of Rooks
2014
Baitha Alga	Mind Of Madness	Ahlan Emarati
2013
No Nay Never	Coach House	Wind Fire
2012
Reckless Abandon	Gale Force Ten	Ian's Dream
2011
Bapak Chinta	Boomerang Bob	Crown Dependency

2010-2001
2010
Approve	Reckless Reward	Excel Bolt
2009
Radiohead	Reignier	Tawaabb
2008
South Central	Spin Cycle	Prolific
2007
Winker Watson	Art Advisor	Spirit Of Sharjah
2006
Dutch Art	Hoh Mike	Cav Okay
2005
Masta Plasta	Strike Up The Band	Classic Encounter
2004
Blue Dakota	Mystical Land	Skywards
2003
Russian Valour	Kheleyf	Nevisian Lad
2002
Baron's Pit	The Bonus King	Marino Marini
2001
Johannesburg	Waterside	Lord Merlin

2000-1991
2000
Superstar Leo	Bouncing Bowdler	Industrial Pride
1999
Warm Heart	Victory Day	Victory Day
1998
Rosselli	Sheer Viking	Monkston Point
1997
Tippitt Boy	Hopping Higgins	Arawak Cay
1996
Tipsy Creek	Raphane	Muchea
1995
Lucky Lionel	Cayman Kai	Mubhij
1994
Mind Games	Shamanic	General Monash
1993
Turtle Island	Gold Land	Redoubtable
1992
Niche	Silver Wizard	Darbonne
1991
Magic Ring	Paris House	Power Lake

1990-1988
1990
Line Engaged	Sylva Honda	Gold Futures
1989
Petillante	Drayton Special	Elapse
1988
Superpower	Desert Dawn	Time To Go Home

The Norfolk Stakes is a Group 2 flat horse race in Great Britain open to two-year-old horses. It is run at Ascot over a distance of 5 furlongs (1,006 metres), and it is scheduled to take place each year in June.

The event was established in 1843, and it was originally called the New Stakes. The inaugural running was won by Rattan.

The race was renamed the Norfolk Stakes in 1973. It now honours the 16th Duke of Norfolk, who served as HM's Representative at Ascot from 1945 to 1972. For a period the event held Group 3 status, and it was promoted to Group 2 level in 2006.

The Norfolk Stakes is currently staged on day three of the five-day Royal Ascot meeting. It was added to the Breeders' Cup Challenge series for 2018 as a "Win and You're In" qualifier for the Breeders' Cup Juvenile Turf Sprint.

== Records ==
Leading jockey (9 wins):

- Lester Piggott – Abermaid (1961), Tin King (1965), Falcon (1966), Swing Easy (1970), Faliraki (1975), Emboss (1977), Precocious (1983), Magic Mirror (1984), Niche (1992)

Leading trainer (4 wins):

- Mathew Dawson – Hobbie Noble (1851), Liddington (1864), Belladrum (1868), Melton (1884)
- James Ryan – Coltness (1875), Adriana (1882), Enterprise (1886), Orvieto (1890)
- John Porter – Friar's Balsam (1887), Goldfinch (1891), Kissing Cup (1894), Flying Fox (1898)
- Atty Persse – Sir Archibald (1907), Seaforth (1910), Damon (1926), Mr Jinks (1928)
- Aidan O'Brien - Johannesburg (2001), Waterloo Bridge (2015), Sioux Nation (2017), Charles Darwin (2025)

== Winners since 1900 ==
Year	Winner	Jockey	Trainer	Time
1900	Bay Melton (Note: In 1900 Bay Melton was unnamed and ran as "colt by Melton".)	Tod Sloan	Gilbert	1:16.00
1901	Duke of Westminster	Sam Loates	Charles Morton	1:14.00
1902	Sermon	William Halsey	Fred Day	1:16.00
1903	Montem	William Halsey	Richard Marsh
1904	Llangibby	William Lane	Peter Gilpin
1905	Colonia	Herbert Jones	Jack Robinson
1906	Slieve Gallion	Billy Higgs	Sam Darling
1907	Sir Archibald	Lucien Lyne	Atty Persse
1908	Bayardo	Bernard Dillon	Alec Taylor Jr.
1909	Lemberg	Bernard Dillon	Alec Taylor Jr.	1:04.60
1910	Seaforth	Herbert Randall	Atty Persse
1911	Lomond	Frank Wootton	Stanley Wootton
1912	Craganour	William Saxby	Jack Robinson	1:05.00
1913	Hapsburg	Fred Herbert	William Halsey	1:02.80
1914	Let Fly	Herbert Jones	Jack Robinson
1915-18	No race
1919	Orpheus	Jack Leach	Felix Leach
1920	Alan Breck	Arthur Smith	Peter Gilpin	1:03.60
1921	Scamp	Freddy Lane	Ralph Moreton
1922	Town Guard	George Archibald Sr.	Peter Gilpin	1:00.60
1923	Druid's Orb	Frank Bullock	Sam H Darling	1:03.80
1924	Black Friar	George Archibald Sr.	Fred Darling	1:04.80
1925	Buckler	Tommy Weston	Tom Waugh	1:02.40
1926	Damon	Harry Beasley Jr.	Atty Persse	1:05.20
1927	Hakim	Charlie Smirke	Richard Dawson	1:03.40
1928	Mr Jinks	Harry Beasley Jr.	Atty Persse	1:04.20
1929	Blenheim	Michael Beary	Richard Dawson	1:03.60
1930	Lightning Star	Steve Donoghue	Fred Sneyd	1:05.20
1931	Spenser	Bobby Jones	Joseph Lawson	1:03.60
1932	Hyperion	Tommy Weston	George Lambton	1:01.00
1933	Colombo	Gordon Richards	Tommy Hogg	1:02.80
1934	Robin Goodfellow (Note: In 1934 Robin Goodfellow was unnamed as a 2-y-o and ran as "Eppie Adair colt".)	George Nicoll	Harry Cottrill	1:04.00
1935	Wyndham (Note: In 1935 Wyndham was unnamed as a 2-y-o and ran as "Bossover colt".)	Steve Donoghue	Donald Snow	1:04.60
1936	Le Grand Duc	Charlie Smirke	Frank Butters	1:02.80
1937	Ramtapa	Jack Brennan	Joseph Lawson	1:03.00
1938	Meadow	Tommy Weston	Joseph Lawson	1:02.40
1939	Tant Mieux	Gordon Richards	Fred Darling	1:03.00
1940-45	No race
1946	Petition	Harry Wragg	Frank Butters	1:05.20
1947 (dh)	Delirium; My Babu (Note: In 1947 My Babu ran as "Lerins" before being renamed.)	Edgar Britt; Charlie Smirke	Jack Leach; Sam Armstrong	1:04.20
1948	Makarpura	Charlie Smirke	Sam Armstrong	1:05.80
1949	Master Gunner	Ken Gethin	Peter Thrale	1:02.40
1950	Bay Meadows	Arthur Wragg	Harry Wragg	1:05.20
1951	Bob Major	Bill Rickaby	Jack Jarvis	1:03.80
1952	Blue Lamp	Doug Smith	Reg Day	1:04.60
1953	Hydrologist	Jimmy Thompson	William Bellerby	1:04.20
1954	Tamerlane	Gordon Richards	Norman Bertie	1:04.20
1955	Gratitude	Doug Smith	Humphrey Cottrill	1:03.77
1956	Skindles Hotel	Brian Swift	Paddy Prendergast	1:02.60
1957	Pall Mall	Harry Carr	Cecil Boyd-Rochfort	1:01.46
1958	Masham	Doug Smith	Geoffrey Brooke	1:03.64
1959	Sound Track	Geoff Lewis	William Smyth	1:03.62
1960	Floribunda	Ron Hutchinson	Paddy Prendergast	1:04.34
1961	Abermaid	Lester Piggott	Harry Wragg	Not taken
1962	Daybreak	Ron Hutchinson	Jack Jarvis	1:03.46
1963	Ballymacad	Ron Hutchinson	Gordon Smyth	1:09.47
1964	Abandoned due to waterlogging
1965	Tin King	Lester Piggott	Fulke Johnson Houghton	1:05.38
1966	Falcon	Lester Piggott	Fulke Johnson Houghton	1:02.90
1967	Porto Bello	Geoff Lewis	Staff Ingham	1:03.64
1968	Song	Joe Mercer	Derrick Candy	1:04.63
1969	Tribal Chief	Jock Wilson	Brian Swift	1:03.87
1970	Swing Easy	Lester Piggott	Jeremy Tree	1:02.91
1971	Philip Of Spain	Geoff Lewis	Noel Murless	1:08.05
1972	Cade's County	George Cadwaladr	Eric Cousins	1:03.53
1973	Habat	Pat Eddery	Peter Walwyn	1:05.29
1974	Overtown	Eric Eldin	Doug Smith	1:02.18
1975	Faliraki	Lester Piggott	Mick O'Toole	1:02.19
1976	Godswalk	Christy Grassick	Dermot Hogan	1:03.07
1977	Emboss	Lester Piggott	Ron Boss	1:03.36
1978	Schweppeshire Lad	Greville Starkey	Michael Stoute	1:02.29
1979	Romeo Romani	Brian Taylor	Ryan Price	1:02.93
1980	Chummy's Special	Greville Starkey	Gavin Hunter	1:04.11
1981	Day Is Done	Wally Swinburn	Dermot Weld	1:02.28
1982	Brondesbury	Tony Ives	Bill O'Gorman	1:00.75
1983	Precocious	Lester Piggott	Henry Cecil	1:01.45
1984	Magic Mirror	Lester Piggott	Vincent O'Brien	1:02.43
1985	Marouble	Joe Mercer	Charlie Nelson	1:01.91
1986	Sizzling Melody	Richard Hills	Lord John FitzGerald	1:00.57
1987	Colmore Row	Bruce Raymond	William Jarvis	1:04.60
1988	Superpower	Tony Ives	Bill O'Gorman	1:01.49
1989	Petillante	Richard Hills	Alex Scott	1:01.96
1990	Line Engaged	Steve Cauthen	David Elsworth	1:02.83
1991	Magic Ring	Alan Munro	Paul Cole	1:00.25
1992	Niche	Lester Piggott	Richard Hannon Sr.	1:01.48
1993	Turtle Island	John Reid	Peter Chapple-Hyam	1:05.95
1994	Mind Games	John Carroll	Jack Berry	1:01.63
1995	Lucky Lionel	Frankie Dettori	Richard Hannon Sr.	1:00.38
1996	Tipsy Creek	Willie Ryan	Ben Hanbury	1:01.37
1997	Tippitt Boy	John Reid	Kevin McAuliffe	1:02.57
1998	Rosselli	John Carroll	Jack Berry	1:03.74
1999	Warm Heart	Frankie Dettori	John Gosden	1:01.50
2000	Superstar Leo	Richard Quinn	William Haggas	1:03.18
2001	Johannesburg	Michael Kinane	Aidan O'Brien	1:02.18
2002	Baron's Pit	Richard Hughes	Richard Hannon Sr.	1:01.92
2003	Russian Valour	Kevin Darley	Mark Johnston	1:01.37
2004	Blue Dakota	Eddie Ahern	Jeremy Noseda	1:01.97
2005 (Note: The 2005 running took place at York)	Masta Plasta	Robert Winston	Howard Johnson	0:57.56
2006	Dutch Art	Alan Munro	Peter Chapple-Hyam	1:01.03
2007	Winker Watson	Jimmy Fortune	Peter Chapple-Hyam	1:00.83
2008	South Central	Robert Winston	Howard Johnson	1:01.83
2009	Radiohead	Jamie Spencer	Brian Meehan	1:02.07
2010	Approve	Eddie Ahern	William Haggas	1:00.14
2011	Bapak Chinta	Phillip Makin	Kevin Ryan	1:03.03
2012	Reckless Abandon	Adam Kirby	Clive Cox	1:01.51
2013	No Nay Never	Joel Rosario	Wesley Ward	0:58.80
2014	Baitha Alga	Frankie Dettori	Richard Hannon Jr.	0:59.81
2015	Waterloo Bridge	Ryan Moore	Aidan O'Brien	0:59.98
2016	Prince of Lir	Luke Morris	Robert Cowell	1:01.17
2017	Sioux Nation	Ryan Moore	Aidan O'Brien	1:00.88
2018	Shang Shang Shang	Joel Rosario	Wesley Ward	0:59.87
2019	A'Ali	Frankie Dettori	Simon Crisford	1:01.90
2020	The Lir Jet	Oisin Murphy	Michael Bell	1:01.55
2021	Perfect Power	Paul Hanagan	Richard Fahey	1:00.44
2022	The Ridler	Paul Hanagan	Richard Fahey	1:00.50
2023	Valiant Force	Rossa Ryan	Adrian Murray	0:59.75
2024	Shareholder	James Doyle	Karl Burke	0:59.77
2025	Charles Darwin	Ryan Moore	Aidan O'Brien	0:58.87
2026	Orthodox	Rossa Ryan	Clive Cox	0:59.42

== Earlier winners ==
- 1843: Rattan
- 1844: Old England
- 1845: Joy
- 1846: Slander
- 1847: Assault
- 1848: Garrick
- 1849: Blarney
- 1850: Citadel
- 1851: Hobbie Noble
- 1852: Hybla
- 1853: Autocrat
- 1854: Monge
- 1855: Milton
- 1856: Zaidee
- 1857: Sedbury
- 1858: North Lincoln
- 1859: Rupee
- 1860: Brown Duchess
- 1861: Alvediston
- 1862: Blue Mantle
- 1863: Evelina
- 1864: Liddington
- 1865: Chibisa
- 1866: Achievement
- 1867: Lady Elizabeth
- 1868: Belladrum
- 1869: Temple
- 1870: Corisande
- 1871: Helmet
- 1872: Marie Stuart
- 1873: Ecossais
- 1874: Galopin
- 1875: Coltness
- 1876: Rob Roy
- 1877: Bellicent
- 1878: Strathern
- 1879: Oceanie
- 1880: Sir Charles
- 1881: Kermesse
- 1882: Adriana
- 1883: Wild Thyme
- 1884: Melton
- 1885: Saraband
- 1886: Enterprise
- 1887: Friar's Balsam
- 1888: Donovan
- 1889: Surefoot
- 1890: Orvieto
- 1891: Goldfinch
- 1892: Isinglass
- 1893: Wedding Bell
- 1894: Kissing Cup
- 1895: Roquebrune
- 1896: Velasquez
- 1897: Florio Rubattino
- 1898: Flying Fox
- 1899: The Gorgon

== See also ==
- Horse racing in Great Britain
- List of British flat horse races
- Recurring sporting events established in 1843 – this race is included under its original title, New Stakes.
