= Superpower (horse) =

British-bred Thoroughbred racehorse

- Sire: Superlative
- Grandsire: Nebbiolo
- Dam: Champ d'Avril
- Damsire: Northfields
- Sex: Stallion
- Foaled: 15 February 1986
- Country: United Kingdom
- Colour: Bay
- Breeder: D A & Mrs Hicks
- Owner: Poh-Lian Yong
- Trainer: Bill O'Gorman
- Record: 15: 7-3-1
- Earnings: £174,408

Major wins
- National Stakes (1988); Norfolk Stakes (1988); Phoenix Stakes (1988)

Superpower (15 February 1986 – after 2002) was a British Thoroughbred racehorse and sire. He was a fast and precocious two-year-old who won his first six races including the National Stakes and the Norfolk Stakes and went on to record his biggest win in the Group 1 Phoenix Stakes. He failed to win in four starts as a three-year-old and was then retired to stud. He had moderate results as a breeding stallion.

== Background ==
Superpower was a bay horse bred in England by Mr & Mrs D A Hicks. During his racing career he was owned by Mrs Poh-Lian Yong and trained by Bill O'Gorman at Newmarket, Suffolk. O'Gorman had built his reputation by training precociously fast two-year-olds, most notably the 1984 British Horse of the Year Provideo.

He was sired by Superlative who was trained by O'Gorman to win the July Stakes and the Flying Childers Stakes in 1983. The best of his other progeny was the German-trained Kornado whose wins included the Group 1 Grosser Preis von Berlin. Superpower's dam Champ d'Avril was a "useful" sprinter who won two races from eleven starts.

== Racing career ==
=== 1988: two-year-old season ===
Superpower was ridden in his first eight races by Tony Ives. The colt made his debut in a maiden race over five furlongs at Newmarket Racecourse on 14 April and won by a length from Windsor Park after taking the lead soon after the start. Superpower quickly ran up a sequence of wins, taking minor events over five furlongs at Newmarket on 29 April, Windsor on 16 May and Folkestone on 23 May. On 31 May he was stepped up in class for the Listed National Stakes over five furlongs at Sandown Park and started 3/1 second favourite behind the Ian Balding-trained Optaria. He led for most of the way and ran on well in the closing stages to win by a length from Shuttlecock Corner. Superpower was moved up again in class for the Group 3 Norfolk Stakes at Royal Ascot on 16 June. Starting the even money favourite against nine opponents he took the lead soon after the start and won "comfortably" by two and a half lengths to take his winning run to six.

On 5 July Superpower started 4/11 favourite for the Chesterfield Stakes at Newmarket but sustained his first defeat as he was overtaken in the final strides and beaten into second place by the outsider Four-Legged Friend. Later that month he was sent to France for the Prix Robert Papin over 1100 metres at Maisons-Laffitte Racecourse and came home third of the nine runners behind Philippi. Walter Swinburn took over the ride when the colt was sent to Ireland to contest the Group 1 Phoenix Stakes over six furlongs at Phoenix Park Racecourse on 7 August. The French filly Tersa (winner of the Prix du Bois) started favourite ahead of Heather Seeker (Curragh Stakes) and Gloriella (Queen Mary Stakes) with Superpower next in the betting on 6/1. The colt started quickly, took the lead in the opening strides and was never headed, winning "easily" by three lengths from Run To Jenny.

At the end of August Superpower was beaten when odds-on favourite for a minor race at York: he had raced along the rail while the winner Madam Millie took advantage of the faster ground down the centre of the track. Willie Carson took the ride for the colt's final race of the season, when he finished fourth behind Shuttlecock Corner in the Flying Childers Stakes at Doncaster in September.

=== 1989: three-year-old season ===
As a three-year-old Superpower was campaigned exclusively over sprint distances and although he failed to win in four starts he produced some good performances in defeat. Ives rode him in his first three races. On his debut he was matched against older horses in the Palace House Stakes at Newmarket in May and put up one of his best efforts as he took the lead two furlongs out before being run down in the final strides and beaten a head by the four-year-old filly Silver Fling. He finished fourth in the Temple Stakes at Sandown later in May and was then off the course for more than two months before running ninth in the King George Stakes. After another lengthy break he ended his career by coming home sixth of the eleven runners in the Diadem Stakes at Ascot in September.

== Stud record ==
Superpower was retired from racing to become a breeding stallion. He sire many minor winners over sprint distances, but no top class performers. His last recorded foals were born in 2003.

== Pedigree ==
Pedigree of Superpower (GB), bay stallion 1986
Sire Superlative (IRE) 1981	Nebbiolo (GB); 1974	Yellow God	Red God
Sire Superlative (IRE) 1981	Nebbiolo (GB); 1974	Yellow God	Sally Deans
Sire Superlative (IRE) 1981	Nebbiolo (GB); 1974	Novara	Birkhahn
Sire Superlative (IRE) 1981	Nebbiolo (GB); 1974	Novara	Norbelle
Sire Superlative (IRE) 1981	Clariden (GB); 1966	Hook Money	Bernborough
Sire Superlative (IRE) 1981	Clariden (GB); 1966	Hook Money	Besieged
Sire Superlative (IRE) 1981	Clariden (GB); 1966	Matterhorn	Matador
Sire Superlative (IRE) 1981	Clariden (GB); 1966	Matterhorn	Priory Hill
Dam Champ d'Avril (IRE) 1977	Northfields (USA); 1968	Northern Dancer	Nearctic
Dam Champ d'Avril (IRE) 1977	Northfields (USA); 1968	Northern Dancer	Natalma
Dam Champ d'Avril (IRE) 1977	Northfields (USA); 1968	Little Hut	Occupy
Dam Champ d'Avril (IRE) 1977	Northfields (USA); 1968	Little Hut	Savage Beauty
Dam Champ d'Avril (IRE) 1977	April Twelfth (IRE); 1967	King's Leap	Princely Gift
Dam Champ d'Avril (IRE) 1977	April Twelfth (IRE); 1967	King's Leap	Impala
Dam Champ d'Avril (IRE) 1977	April Twelfth (IRE); 1967	Veronique	Matador
Dam Champ d'Avril (IRE) 1977	April Twelfth (IRE); 1967	Veronique	Narcisse (Family: 5-j)

- Superpower was inbred 4 × 4 to Matador, meaning that this stallion appears twice in the fourth generation of his pedigree.
