= Tiffin (horse) =

Thoroughbred racehorse

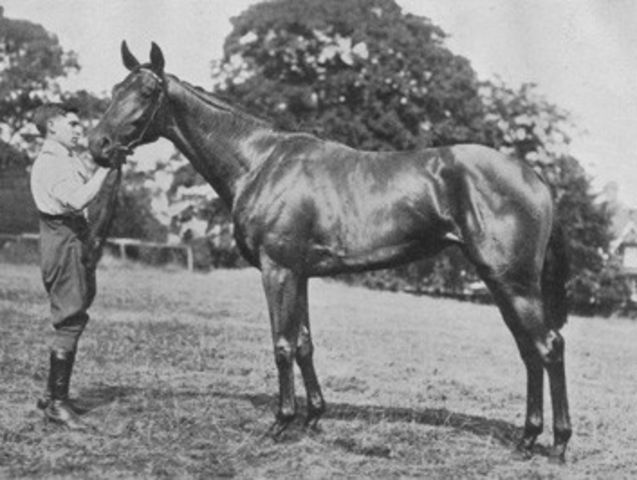
- Sire: Tetratema
- Grandsire: The Tetrarch
- Dam: Dawn Wind
- Damsire: Sunstar
- Sex: Mare
- Foaled: 1926
- Country: United Kingdom
- Colour: Bay
- Breeder: Sir John Rutherford, 1st Baronet
- Owner: John Egerton, 4th Earl of Ellesmere
- Trainer: Fred Darling
- Record: 8: 8–0–0
- Earnings: £16,516

Major wins
- National Breeders' Produce Stakes (1928); Cheveley Park Stakes (1928); July Cup (1929); King George Stakes (1929)

Awards
- Top-rated British two-year-old (1928)

Tiffin (1926 – 7 March 1931) was a British Thoroughbred racehorse and broodmare, who was undefeated in a career of eight races. Tiffin won five races in 1928 including the National Breeders' Produce Stakes at Sandown Park and the Cheveley Park Stakes at Newmarket and was the highest-rated British two-year-old of either sex. Her three-year-old season was disrupted by illness and injury, but she won all three of her starts, proving herself the year's best sprinter with wins in the July Cup at Newmarket and the King George Stakes at Goodwood. At her peak she was regarded as one of the fastest racehorses in the world. At the end of her racing career she was retired to stud where she produced one foal before dying in 1931.

== Background ==
Tiffin was a small bay filly bred by Sir John Rutherford, 1st Baronet, a Conservative Party politician who previously owned the St Leger Stakes and Ascot Gold Cup winner Solario. She was sired by Tetratema, the leading British two-year-old of 1919 who went on to win the 2000 Guineas and many important sprint races. As a stallion, Tetratema sired many good sprinters and milers and was the British champion sire in Tiffin's three-year-old season. Her dam, Dawn Wind (or Dawn-Wind) was reportedly regarded by her trainer George Lambton as the fastest filly he ever trained, but never ran in a race owing to injury.

As a foal, Tiffin suffered badly from an infestation of worms and failed to thrive. Rutherford sold her for 1,100 guineas to Lord Ellesmere who sent the filly into training with Fred Darling. Darling, who trained at Beckhampton in Wiltshire had recently won the first of his six British trainers championships. Despite her small stature and persistent health problems, Tiffin was a high-spirited and "playful" filly, who was often difficult to handle.

== Racing career ==
=== 1928: two-year-old season ===
Tiffin began her racing career with a win in the Wilbraham Stakes at Newmarket in spring. She was then sent to Sandown to contest the five furlong National Breeders' Produce Stakes, which at the time was the most valuable race of the season for two-year-olds, with prize money of over £7,000. She won from the colt Mr Jinks, who went on to win the following year's 2000 Guineas. In doing so she emulated her sire Tetratema and her grandsire The Tetrarch, who had won the race in 1919 and 1913 respectively. Tiffin maintained her run of success by winning the Ham Stakes at Goodwood in July and the Convivial Plate at York Racecourse in August. Her victory in the latter race was particularly well-received, as it gave her popular jockey Gordon Richards his hundredth win of the season. On her final run of the season she appeared at Newmarket in October for the six furlong Cheveley Park Stakes, the most prestigious race of the year for two-year-old fillies in Britain. She won easily to confirm her status as one of the best British juveniles of 1928.

Throughout the season, Tiffin had shown a calm, intelligent attitude on the racecourse and exceptional early speed which often had her opponents struggling from the start. She was entered in the following year's 1000 Guineas and Epsom Oaks, but some observers doubted that she would have the stamina to become a classic winner. In the official Free Handicap, a ranking of the best two-year-olds, she was assigned top weight of 133 pounds, one pound ahead of the top-rated colts Mr Jinks and Costaki Pasha.

=== 1929: three-year-old season ===
In early 1929, Tiffin was reported to be working well at Beckhampton and was expected to run in a public trial race before taking her chance in the 1000 Guineas. The filly then fell gravely ill with an "internal ailment" which placed her life in danger and forced her to miss all her spring engagements including the Guineas and the Oaks. She made her first appearance as a three-year-old at Royal Ascot in June when she ran in the five furlong Fern Hill Stakes. Tiffin won "in a canter" from some of the best British sprinters with Le Phare, a colt who went on to win the Sussex Stakes and the Stewards' Cup, taking second place.

Tiffin was then sent to Newmarket for the six furlong July Cup. The closing stages of the race developed into a contest between Tiffin and the four-year-old colt Royal Minstrel (also sired by Tetratema), the winner of the St. James's Palace Stakes and the Cork and Orrery Stakes. After appearing beaten inside the final furlong, Tiffin rallied to gain the lead in the closing strides and won by a short head in a new track record time of 1:12.2. The filly's win was received with "marked enthusiasm" by the Newmarket crowd. In his next race, Royal Minstrel recorded an upset win over Fairway in the Eclipse Stakes. Later in the same month, Tiffin reverted to five furlongs for the King George Stakes at Goodwood and won impressively from the filly Pladda.

While being exercised at Beckhampton in autumn 1929, Tiffin broke loose from her handlers and slipped on a road. She sustained a broken bone in her knee which forced her retirement from racing. At the time of her retirement she was ranked alongside Royal Minstrel and Fairway as one of the three best horses in England and was described in the press as "the fastest horse in the world, irrespective of age or sex".

== Assessment ==
In their book, A Century of Champions, based on the Timeform rating system, John Randall and Tony Morris rated Tiffin the seventeenth best two-year-old filly trained in Britain or Ireland in the 20th century.

== Stud record ==
Tiffin retired to stud where she produced a filly foal sired by Blandford on 17 February 1931. A few days after giving birth, Tiffin became seriously ill and was found to be suffering from peritonitis and a perforated bowel. She died on 7 March at the Stetchworth stud in Newmarket. Her daughter, named Merenda, was raised by a foster mare and went on to win three races including the Chesham Stakes at Royal Ascot in 1933. Merenda was the direct female ancestor of many winners, most notably the Breeders' Cup Sprint winner Smile.

== Pedigree ==
Pedigree of Tiffin (GB), bay mare, 1926
Sire Tetratema (GB) 1917	The Tetrarch; 1911	Roi Herode	Le Samaritain
Sire Tetratema (GB) 1917	The Tetrarch; 1911	Roi Herode	Roxelane
Sire Tetratema (GB) 1917	The Tetrarch; 1911	Vahren	Bona Vista
Sire Tetratema (GB) 1917	The Tetrarch; 1911	Vahren	Castania
Sire Tetratema (GB) 1917	Scotch Gift; 1907	Symington	Ayrshire
Sire Tetratema (GB) 1917	Scotch Gift; 1907	Symington	Tarporley
Sire Tetratema (GB) 1917	Scotch Gift; 1907	Maund	Ianthe
Sire Tetratema (GB) 1917	Scotch Gift; 1907	Maund	Sandal
Dam Dawn Wind (GB) 1920	Sunstar; 1908	Sundridge	Amphion
Dam Dawn Wind (GB) 1920	Sunstar; 1908	Sundridge	Sierra
Dam Dawn Wind (GB) 1920	Sunstar; 1908	Doris	Loved One
Dam Dawn Wind (GB) 1920	Sunstar; 1908	Doris	Lauretta
Dam Dawn Wind (GB) 1920	Pretty Dark; 1911	Dark Ronald	Bay Ronald
Dam Dawn Wind (GB) 1920	Pretty Dark; 1911	Dark Ronald	Darkie
Dam Dawn Wind (GB) 1920	Pretty Dark; 1911	Pretty Quick	Eager
Dam Dawn Wind (GB) 1920	Pretty Dark; 1911	Pretty Quick	Cydaria (Family: 8-a)
