= The Tetrarch =

Irish-bred Thoroughbred racehorse

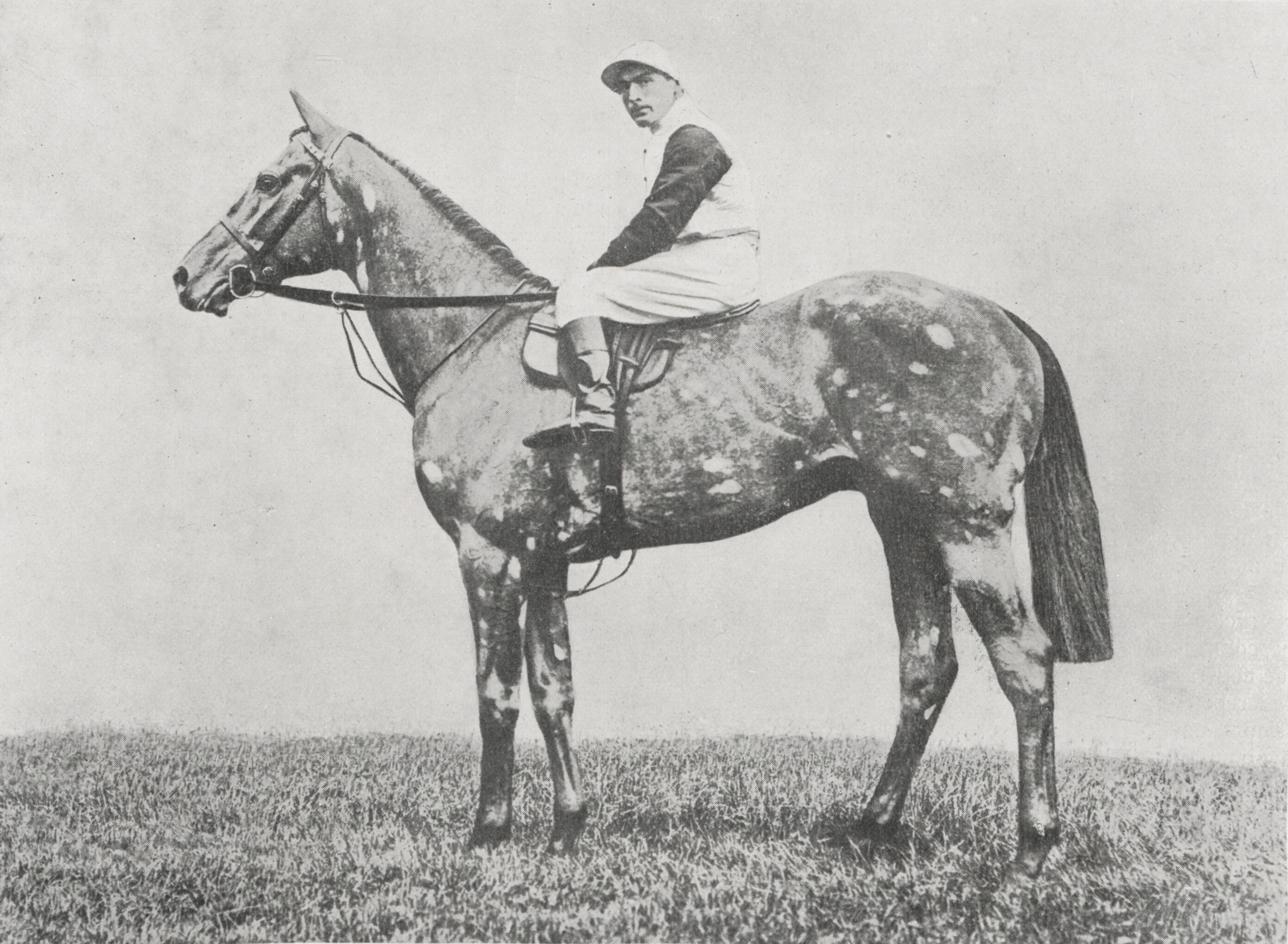
- The Tetrarch & jockey Steve Donoghue, 1913
- Sire: Roi Herode (FR)
- Grandsire: Le Samaritain
- Dam: Vahren
- Damsire: Bona Vista
- Sex: Stallion
- Foaled: 1911
- Country: Ireland
- Colour: Grey
- Breeder: Edward Kennedy
- Owner: Dermot McCalmont
- Trainer: Atty Persse
- Record: 7: 7–0–0
- Earnings: £11,336

Major wins
- Woodcote Stakes (1913); Coventry Stakes (1913); National Breeders' Produce Stakes (1913); Rous Memorial Stakes (1913); Champagne Stakes (1913)

Awards
- Leading sire in GB & Ireland (1919)

Honours
- Britain's two-year-old of the 20th century Tetrarch Stakes at the Curragh
- Last updated on February 17, 2011

The Tetrarch (1911–1935) was an Irish-bred, British-trained Thoroughbred racehorse. He was undefeated in a racing career of seven starts and was voted the best British-trained two-year-old of the 20th century according to the National Horseracing Museum. He did not race after 1913 and was retired to stud where he became an influential sire.

== Breeding ==
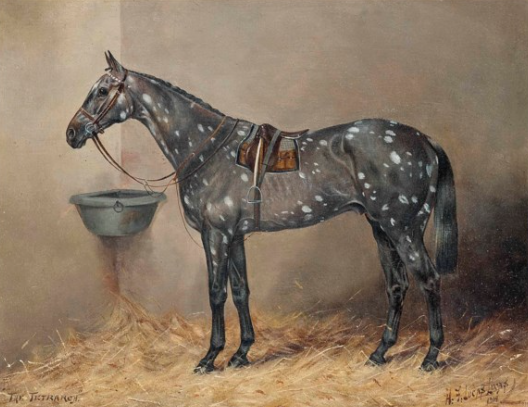
"The Tetrarch", as painted by Henry Frederick Lucas-Lucas (1848-1943) and Albert Clark (1821-1909).

Foaled at Straffan Station Stud, near Ardclough, in County Kildare in Ireland, he was sired by Roi Herode (France) out of Vahren. His damsire (Bona Vista) was by Bend Or (after whom Bend-Or spots are named). The Tetrarch was a gangly and less-than-attractive colt whose grey coat was sprinkled with white blotches. Dismissed as having no racing potential by some buyers, he was ultimately sold by his breeder to Major Dermot McCalmont and placed under the care of trainer Atty Persse.

== Racing record and legacy ==
Sent to the track as a two-year-old, under jockey Steve Donoghue The Tetrarch easily defeated his competition. Quickly dubbed the "Spotted Wonder," he easily won all seven of his 1913 starts. In his one real test he came from behind to capture the National Breeders' Produce Stakes by a neck, but that one close finish only resulted after a mix-up at the start that left him four or five lengths back. An injury in October 1913 ended The Tetrarch's two-year-old racing campaign. The following spring he reinjured himself in training. His handlers were hoping he would heal sufficiently to return to racing, but by the end of 1914 came to the conclusion that he would never race again.

There is (as with many star two-year-olds) the question of what The Tetrarch's – and his competition's – continued physical development would have meant to his racing performance at age three. In 1913 The Tetrarch easily beat all comers including Stornoway, who won several races that year; among them were the Gimcrack and Norfolk Stakes (now The Flying Childers Stakes). However, none of The Tetrarch's races were more than six furlongs (¾ mile) and because he never raced at age three, he was not tested at standard mile to mile-and-a-half distances. His bloodlines, though, pointed to stamina.

It is also noted that the 1913 crop of two-year-olds was less than spectacular, and the 1914 Champion Stakes, Ascot Gold Cup and the three British Classic Races for colts were all won by different horses with less-than-distinguished career records. The question of The Tetrarch's ability at longer distances is a legitimate one. His successful son Tetratema lost at seven furlongs and won one race at eight furlongs (one mile); of his twelve other wins, all were at five to six furlongs. The Tetrarch's speedy daughter Mumtaz Mahal won five important sprint races at age two but at age three was beaten at her first tries at longer distances. In two one mile races, she finished second in the 1,000 Guineas and was fifth in the Coronation Stakes. Mumtaz Mahal's handlers then limited her to competing only in sprint races and she won the six-furlong King George Stakes and the five-furlong Nunthorpe Stakes.

While on the other hand his son (Salmon-Trout) was not only a juvenile racing at five to seven furlongs but would maintain racing form well into his three old season, winning The Princess of Wales's Stakes (a 12-furlong race) and the St. Leger Stakes (a 14-plus-furlong race). The Tetrarch also produced two other St. Leger Stakes winners (Polemarch and Caligula), which would indicate that the birth of Salmon-Trout was not a fluke. Some of his progeny were sprinters and stayed that way, while others went on to mature into distance champions. The abilities of The Tetrarch’s progeny ranged so wildly that it is difficult to tell whether or not he would have filled out as a three-year-old by looking at his offspring alone.

Lauded for his greatness on the track by racing fans of the day, many appraisals of The Tetrarch decades after his death have been equally glowing. The United Kingdom's National Horseracing Museum called The Tetrarch a "phenomenon" and report that he was voted Britain's two-year-old of his century. In their description of the colt, the National Sporting Library's Thoroughbred Heritage website in the United States calls The Tetrarch "probably the greatest two-year-old of all time" and "possibly the greatest runner ever".

== Stud record ==
In 1915 he was sent to Thomastown Stud in County Kilkenny, Ireland, and later moved to his owner's Ballylinch Stud just east of Thomastown. The Tetrarch had difficulty as a stallion due to a lack of interest, and would be plagued by infertility problems for a number of years. Although he sired only 130 foals throughout his stud career his progeny inherited his blazing speed, and in 1919 he was the leading sire in Great Britain & Ireland as a result of the performances of Tetratema and the filly Snow Maiden. Another daughter (Mumtaz Mahal) won a number of important sprint races and, according to "Thoroughbred Heritage" went on to become one of the most important broodmares of the 20th century.

Mumatz Mahal became an important ancestress in the pedigrees of some of history's most influential sire lines, including Nasrullah, Royal Charger, Tudor Minstrel and Mahmoud. Nasrullah sired Bold Ruler, the sire of the Seattle Slew/A.P. Indy modern stallion lines. Bold Ruler is possibly most famous for producing Secretariat, renowned for his stamina and also an influential broodmare sire. Nasrullah also produced the lines leading to Red God (1954), Grey Sovereign (1956) and Never Bend (1960). The Tetrarch also sired Paola (who won the 1923 Coronation Stakes) and The Satrap (champion two-year-old of 1926).

As for questions regarding The Tetrarch's potential to win at a distance, three sons won the St. Leger Stakes (the longest classic) – Caligula (1920), Polemarch (1921) and Salmon-Trout (1924).

The Tetrarch died at Ballylinch Stud on 8 August 1935 at the age of twenty-four, and is buried there in the farm's equine cemetery.

== Sire line tree ==
^{*} A sire line is the term given to the bloodlines and male descendants from a single stallion.

Descendants of The Tetrarch
- The Tetrarch
  - Arch-Gift
    - Archway
    - Golden Oracle
    - Double Arch
  - Chaud
  - Stefan the Great
    - Chubasco
      - Guernanville
      - Chuchoteur
      - Annibal
    - Agathos
      - Athos
    - Niantic
    - Rosehearty
    - Tolgus
      - Ochiltree
    - Vespasian
    - Damon
    - Kiev
      - Kievex
    - Iron Crown
    - Cap Gris Nez
    - Jean Valjean
    - Silver Cord
    - Bushranger
    - King Kong
  - Viceroy
    - Celliota
  - Caligula
    - Prestissimo
      - Sir Roger
    - Star of Italy
  - Royal Alarm
    - Bacchus Rex
      - Dichato
    - Piamonte
    - Staretz
    - Caballero
  - Sarchedon
    - High Pitch
  - Serment D'Amour
  - Tea Tray
    - Kiosk
    - Bronze Tray
  - Tetrameter
    - Six Wheeler
      - Kicos
        - Kurir
      - Lagunac
    - Millimetro
    - Kingsem
    - Sidenhuset
  - Tetratema
    - Rolls Royce
    - Fourth Hand
    - Treat
    - Royal Minstrel
      - Gay Monarch
      - Singing Wood
      - Mr Bones
      - Court Scandal
      - Melodist
      - Time Step
      - First Fiddle
        - Master Fiddle
    - Mr Jinks
      - Maltravers
      - Fair William
        - Crusader's Horn
      - Rogerstone Castle
      - The Jigger
      - Effervescence
    - To You
    - Teacup
    - Tetrarchal
    - Arthos
    - Sherab
      - Doublrab
    - Tetramite
    - Thyestes
    - Bacteriophage
      - Teleferique
        - Torcello
        - Liberal
        - Alizier
        - Cobalt
        - Marly Knowe
        - Elu
        - Jangas
      - Bacchus
      - Irifle
    - Strathcarron
    - Gino
      - American Way
    - Alishah
      - Allison
    - Satyr
    - Turbotin
      - Palatino
    - Theft
      - Hayatake
      - Cymba
        - Dainana Hoshu
      - High Record
      - Takakurayama
      - Issei
        - Taisei Hope
      - Tokino Minoru
      - Bostonian
    - Theio
    - Lay Lord
    - Foray
    - Tahir
    - Prometheus
    - Quarteroon
    - Prince Tetra
    - Tetrabar
    - Zalophus
      - Kilmore
  - Bouleverse
  - Corban
  - Polemarch
    - Hechicero
    - Ilion
    - Vino Puro
  - Precious
  - Syrian Prince
  - Tractor
  - Trash
  - Blue Ensign
    - Navigator
    - Somerset
  - Noblesse Oblige
  - Puttenden
  - Chief Ruler
    - Admiral Drake
    - Supremacy
    - Rulanut
    - Padishah
    - Gold Rod
    - Francis Drake
    - Royal Chief
      - Bruce
      - Royal Raider
      - Royal Tan
  - Synorix
  - Defiance
  - Old Rowley
    - Old Riley
    - Old Reliance
  - Salmon-Trout
    - Salmon Leap
    - Reel
    - King Salmon
      - Jamaica Inn
      - Royal Chaplain
      - King's Abbey
        - Golden Abbey
      - Treble Crown
      - Kingstone
      - John Moore
      - Manguari
      - Prosper
        - Vandalo
        - Nicho
      - Quasi
      - Ubi
    - Gipsy George
    - Prawn Curry
  - Dear Herod
  - Ethnarch
    - Archon
    - Ethnos
  - The Satrap
    - Auralia

== Pedigree ==
Pedigree of The Tetrarch, gray stallion, 1911
| Sire Roi Herode gray 1904 | Le Samaritain gr. 1895 | Le Sancy gr. 1884 | Atlantic |
| Sire Roi Herode gray 1904 | Le Samaritain gr. 1895 | Le Sancy gr. 1884 | Gem of Gems |
| Sire Roi Herode gray 1904 | Le Samaritain gr. 1895 | Clementina ch. 1880 | Doncaster* |
| Sire Roi Herode gray 1904 | Le Samaritain gr. 1895 | Clementina ch. 1880 | Clemence |
| Sire Roi Herode gray 1904 | Roxelane ch. 1894 | War Dance b. 1887 | Galliard |
| Sire Roi Herode gray 1904 | Roxelane ch. 1894 | War Dance b. 1887 | War Paint |
| Sire Roi Herode gray 1904 | Roxelane ch. 1894 | Rose Of York b. 1880 | Speculum* |
| Sire Roi Herode gray 1904 | Roxelane ch. 1894 | Rose Of York b. 1880 | Rouge Rose* |
| Dam Vahren chestnut 1897 | Bona Vista ch. 1889 | Bend Or ch. 1877 | Doncaster* |
| Dam Vahren chestnut 1897 | Bona Vista ch. 1889 | Bend Or ch. 1877 | Rouge Rose* |
| Dam Vahren chestnut 1897 | Bona Vista ch. 1889 | Vista b. 1879 | Macaroni |
| Dam Vahren chestnut 1897 | Bona Vista ch. 1889 | Vista b. 1879 | Verdure |
| Dam Vahren chestnut 1897 | Castania ch. 1889 | Hagioscope ch. 1878 | Speculum* |
| Dam Vahren chestnut 1897 | Castania ch. 1889 | Hagioscope ch. 1878 | Sophia |
| Dam Vahren chestnut 1897 | Castania ch. 1889 | Rose Garden ch. 1878 | Kingcraft |
| Dam Vahren chestnut 1897 | Castania ch. 1889 | Rose Garden ch. 1878 | Eglantine (Family 2-o) |

* The Tetrarch is inbred 4S x 4D to the stallion Doncaster, meaning that he appears fourth generation on the sire side of his pedigree and fourth generation on the dam side of his pedigree.

* The Tetrarch is inbred 4S x 4D to the stallion Speculum, meaning that he appears fourth generation on the sire side of his pedigree and fourth generation on the dam side of his pedigree.

* The Tetrarch is inbred 4S x 4D to the mare Rouge Rose, meaning that she appears fourth generation on the sire side of his pedigree and fourth generation on the dam side of his pedigree.

== Cultural reference ==
The Tetrarch is referenced in Siegfried Sassoon's 1919 poem Sporting Acquaintances as a racehorse he had bet on before the First World War.

The Tetrarch is the sire of Tommy Shelby's horse, Grace's Secret, in season two of the television series Peaky Blinders.

== See also ==
- Flying Childers Stakes
- List of leading Thoroughbred racehorses
- Steve Donoghue
