= Flamingo (horse) =

British-bred Thoroughbred racehorse

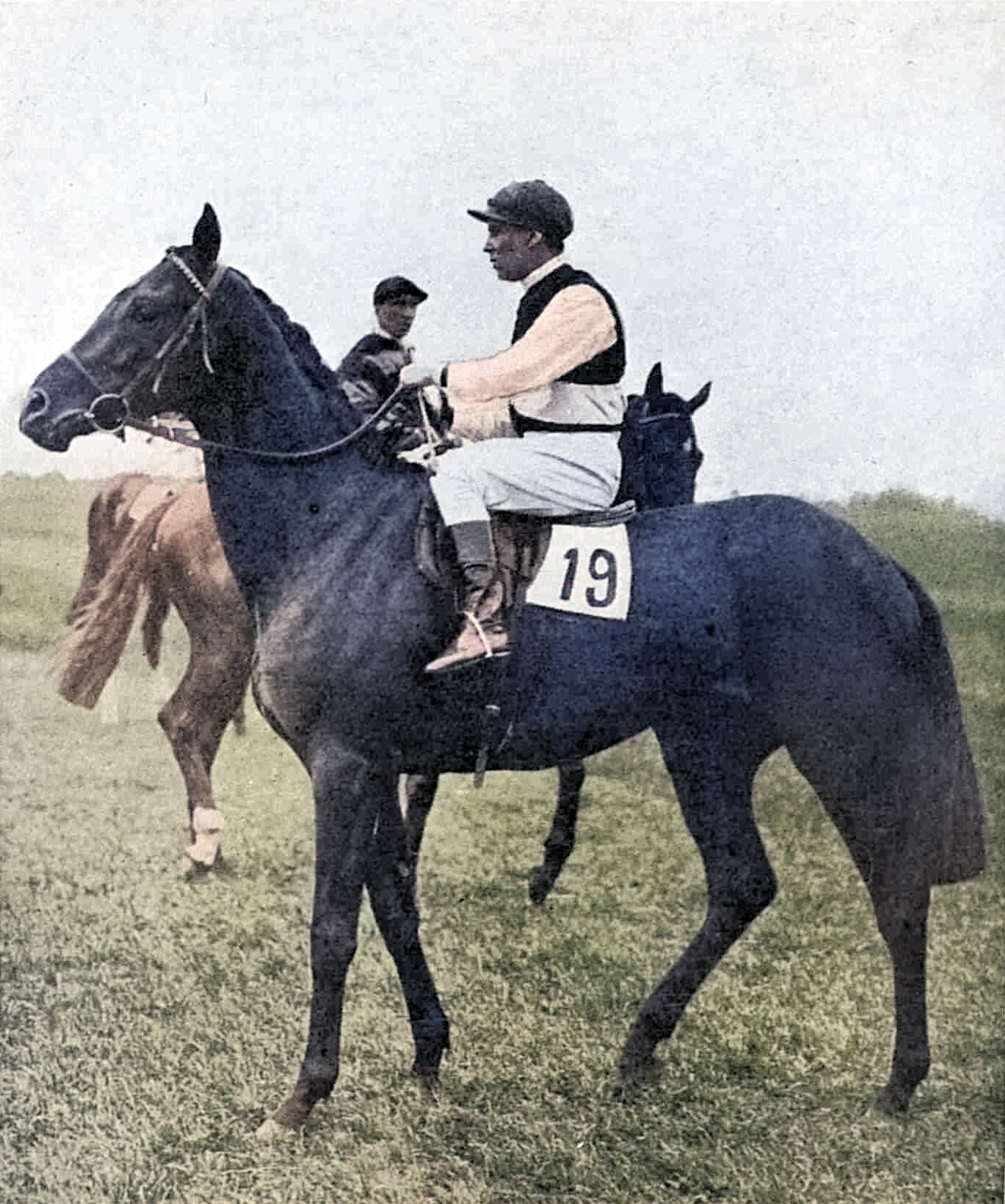
- Flamingo at the 2000 Guineas Stakes in 1928.
- Sire: Flamboyant
- Grandsire: Tracery
- Dam: Lady Peregrine
- Damsire: White Eagle
- Sex: Stallion
- Foaled: 1925
- Country: United Kingdom
- Colour: Bay
- Breeder: Sir John Robinson
- Owner: Laurence Philipps, 1st Baron Milford
- Trainer: Jack Jarvis
- Record: 11: 6-2-0

Major wins
- Spring Stakes (1927); Fulbourne Stakes (1927); National Breeders' Produce Stakes (1927); Column Produce Stakes (1928); 2000 Guineas (1928); Great Yorkshire Stakes (1928)

Flamingo (1925 – 7 November 1947) was a British Thoroughbred racehorse and sire. In 1927 he was one of the best two-year-old colts in England when he won three of his five races including the National Breeders' Produce Stakes. In the following year he won the 2000 Guineas and the Great Yorkshire Stakes as well as finishing second in the Epsom Derby and fourth in the St Leger. After his retirement from racing he had some success as a breeding stallion.

== Background ==
Flamingo was a small but "beautifully made" bay horse bred in England by Sir John Robinson. As a yearling he was offered for sale and was bought for 1800 guineas by Jack Jarvis on behalf of Laurence Philipps, 1st Baron Milford. The colt was take into training by Jarvis at his Park Lodge stable at Newmarket, Suffolk.

Flamingo was sired by Flamboyant, a top-class stayer who won the Doncaster Cup in 1921 and the Goodwood Cup in 1922. Flamingo's dam Lady Peregrine has a half-sister to Omar Khayyam and became a very influential broodmare whose other descendants have included Aloma's Ruler, Septimus and Cirrus des Aigles.

== Racing career ==
=== 1927: two-year-old season ===
In the spring of 1927 Flamingo won the appropriately named Spring Stakes at Newmarket Racecourse. He finished fourth behind Sunny Trace in the Windsor Castle Stakes at Royal Ascot in June and then took the Fulbourne Stakes at Newmarket in early July, winning "cleverly" by a neck. Later in July, at Sandown Park he was ridden by Charlie Elliott (jockey) the National Breeders' Produce Stakes which was then the most valuable two-year-old race in England. Starting at odds of 7/1 in a 21-runner field he won from Jack Mytton and Maret Girl with the favoured Pharamond unplaced. He finished second on his other start that year.

Flamingo ended the season with earnings of £7328, making him the most financially successful juvenile in England, and was regarded with Fairway as one of the two leading contenders for the following year's Epsom Derby. He was described as a "dour fighter", but lacking in scope and room for improvement. In the Free Handicap, an assessment of the best two-year-olds to race in Britain he was assigned a weight of 122 pounds, making him the fourth-best horse of his generation behind Fairway, The Hermit II and Buland.

=== 1928: three-year-old season ===
During the winter of 1927/8 Jack Jarvis was reported to be "intensely pleased" with the colt's progress. Flamingo began his second season by taking the Column Produce Stakes at Newmarket in April winning by a neck from Sans Changer, to whom he was conceding fifteen pounds in weight. On 2 May, Flamingo, ridden by Elliott, started at odds of 5/1 for the 120th running over the Rowley Mile. Despite sweating up before the start, he was always traveling well and won by a head from Royal Minstrel with O'Curry a length and a half away in third. After the race Elliott said, "I had the race won just when I wanted... when I shook him up he answered with the gameness I expected."

In the Epsom Derby over 1 1/2 miles on 6 June Flamingo was strongly fancied although Fairway started favourite. In the immediate build-up to the race the colt had been afforded police protection to prevent his being targeted by "dopers and other evilly-disposed individuals". Flamingo broke well and disputed the lead with Sunny Trace with the pair going "hell for leather" and setting an extremely strong pace before the latter gave way, allowing Flamingo open up a clear advantage in the straight. He looked exhausted however in the last quarter mile and was overtaken by the 33/1 outsider Felstead who won by 1 1/2 lengths. Later that month the colt was beaten when sent to France for the Grand Prix de Paris at Longchamp Racecourse. According to press reports he started favourite but became agitated and upset owing to his unfamiliarity with the French starting procedures and finished unplaced behind Cri de Guerre.

Flamingo returned to the track in late August and won the Great Yorkshire Stakes over fourteen furlongs at York Racecourse carrying a weight of 135 pounds. On 10 September Flamingo contested the St Leger Stakes over 14 1/2 furlongs at Doncaster Racecourse. Racing on unusually firm ground he came home fourth of the thirteen runners behind Fairway, Palais Royal and Cyclonic.

=== 1929: four-year-old season ===
Flamingo remained in training as a four-year-old in 1929 with the Ascot Gold Cup as his objective but did not stand up to training and was retired from racing at the end of the year.

== Assessment and honours ==
In their book, A Century of Champions, based on the Timeform rating system, John Randall and Tony Morris rated Flamingo an "inferior" winner of the 2000 Guineas.

== Stud record ==
After his retirement from racing Flamingo became a breeding stallion in England. The best of his offspring included Flyon (Ascot Gold Cup) and Flamenco (St James's Palace Stakes), Bao Dai (Prix du Petit Couvert, Prix La Haye Jousselin). Flamingo died on 7 November 1947.

== Pedigree ==
Pedigree of Flamingo (GB), bay stallion, 1925
Sire Flamboyant (GB) 1918	Tracery (USA); 1909	Rock Sand (GB	Sainfoin
Sire Flamboyant (GB) 1918	Tracery (USA); 1909	Rock Sand (GB	Roquebrune
Sire Flamboyant (GB) 1918	Tracery (USA); 1909	Topiary (GB)	Orme
Sire Flamboyant (GB) 1918	Tracery (USA); 1909	Topiary (GB)	Plaisanterie
Sire Flamboyant (GB) 1918	Simonath (GB); 1905	St Simon	Galopin
Sire Flamboyant (GB) 1918	Simonath (GB); 1905	St Simon	St Angela
Sire Flamboyant (GB) 1918	Simonath (GB); 1905	Philomath (IRE)	Philammon
Sire Flamboyant (GB) 1918	Simonath (GB); 1905	Philomath (IRE)	Chrysalis
Dam Lady Peregrine (GB) 1916	White Eagle (GB); 1905	Gallinule	Isonomy
Dam Lady Peregrine (GB) 1916	White Eagle (GB); 1905	Gallinule	Moorhen
Dam Lady Peregrine (GB) 1916	White Eagle (GB); 1905	Merry Gal	Galopin
Dam Lady Peregrine (GB) 1916	White Eagle (GB); 1905	Merry Gal	Mary Seaton
Dam Lady Peregrine (GB) 1916	Lisma (GB); 1907	Persimmon	St Simon
Dam Lady Peregrine (GB) 1916	Lisma (GB); 1907	Persimmon	Perdita
Dam Lady Peregrine (GB) 1916	Lisma (GB); 1907	Luscious	Royal Hampton
Dam Lady Peregrine (GB) 1916	Lisma (GB); 1907	Luscious	Alveole (Family 9-h)

- Flamingo was inbred 3 × 4 to St Simon, meaning that this stallion appears in both the third and fourth generations of his pedigree.
