= British flat racing Champion Trainer =

British horse trainer whose horses won the most prize money during a season

The Champion Trainer of flat racing in Great Britain is the trainer whose horses have won the most prize money during a season. The list below shows the Champion Trainer for each year since 1896. The Championship was originally run from November until the end of the following October but since 2016 it has spanned from January until December.

== Championship winners by trainer ==
Rank	Based	Trainer	Titles	Winning Years
1.	England	Alec Taylor, Jr.	12	1907, 1909, 1910, 1914, 1917, 1918, 1919, 1920, 1921, 1922, 1923, 1925
2.	England	Sir Henry Cecil	10	1976, 1978, 1979, 1982, 1984, 1985, 1987, 1988, 1990, 1993
	England	Sir Michael Stoute	10	1981, 1986, 1989, 1994, 1997, 2000, 2003, 2005, 2006, 2009
4.	England	Noel Murless	9	1948, 1957, 1959, 1960, 1961, 1967, 1968, 1970, 1973
5.	England	Frank Butters	8	1927, 1928, 1932, 1934, 1935, 1944, 1946, 1949
6.	Ireland	Aidan O'Brien	8	2001, 2002, 2007, 2008, 2016, 2017, 2024, 2025
7.	England	Fred Darling	6	1926, 1933, 1940, 1941, 1942, 1947
	England	John Gosden	6	2012, 2015, 2018, 2019, 2020, 2023
9.	England	Cecil Boyd-Rochfort	6	1937, 1938, 1954, 1955, 1958
10.	England	Dick Hern	4	1962, 1972, 1980, 1983
	England	Richard Hannon Sr.	4	1992, 2010, 2011, 2013
	England	Saeed bin Suroor	4	1996, 1998, 1999, 2004
13.	England	Richard Marsh	3	1897, 1898, 1900
	England	George Lambton	3	1906, 1911, 1912
	England	Dick Dawson	3	1916, 1924, 1929
	England	Jack Jarvis	3	1939, 1951, 1953
	Ireland	Paddy Prendergast	3	1963, 1964, 1965
18.	England	Joseph Lawson	2	1931, 1936
	Ireland	Vincent O'Brien	2	1966, 1977
	England	Peter Walwyn	2	1974, 1975
	England	Charlie Appleby	2	2021, 2022
22.	England	Alfred Hayhoe	1	1896
	England	John Porter	1	1899
	United States	John Huggins	1	1901
	England	Bob Sievier	1	1902
	England	George Blackwell	1	1903
	England	Peter Gilpin	1	1904
	England	Jack Robinson	1	1905
	England	Charles Morton	1	1908
	England	Richard Wootton	1	1913
	England	Charles Peck	1	1915
	England	Atty Persse	1	1930
	England	Walter Nightingall	1	1943
	England	Walter Earl	1	1945
	France	Charles Semblat	1	1950
	England	Marcus Marsh	1	1952
	England	Charles Elsey	1	1956
	England	Arthur Budgett	1	1969
	England	Ian Balding	1	1971
	England	Paul Cole	1	1991
	England	John Dunlop	1	1995
	England	Richard Hannon Jr.	1	2014
	England	Thady Gosden	1	2023

== Championship winners by year ==
- 1896 - Alfred Hayhoe
- 1897 - Richard Marsh
- 1898 - Richard Marsh
- 1899 - John Porter
- 1900 - Richard Marsh
- 1901 - John Huggins
- 1902 - Bob Sievier
- 1903 - George Blackwell
- 1904 - Peter Gilpin
- 1905 - Jack Robinson
- 1906 - George Lambton
- 1907 - Alec Taylor, Jr.
- 1908 - Charles Morton
- 1909 - Alec Taylor, Jr.
- 1910 - Alec Taylor, Jr.
- 1911 - George Lambton
- 1912 - George Lambton
- 1913 - Richard Wootton
- 1914 - Alec Taylor, Jr.
- 1915 - Charles Peck
- 1916 - Dick Dawson
- 1917 - Alec Taylor, Jr.
- 1918 - Alec Taylor, Jr.
- 1919 - Alec Taylor, Jr.
- 1920 - Alec Taylor, Jr.
- 1921 - Alec Taylor, Jr.
- 1922 - Alec Taylor, Jr.
- 1923 - Alec Taylor, Jr.
- 1924 - Dick Dawson
- 1925 - Alec Taylor, Jr.
- 1926 - Fred Darling
- 1927 - Frank Butters
- 1928 - Frank Butters
- 1929 - Dick Dawson
- 1930 - Atty Persse
- 1931 - Joseph Lawson
- 1932 - Frank Butters
- 1933 - Fred Darling
- 1934 - Frank Butters
- 1935 - Frank Butters
- 1936 - Joseph Lawson
- 1937 - Cecil Boyd-Rochfort
- 1938 - Cecil Boyd-Rochfort
- 1939 - Jack Jarvis
- 1940 - Fred Darling
- 1941 - Fred Darling
- 1942 - Fred Darling
- 1943 - Walter Nightingall
- 1944 - Frank Butters
- 1945 - Walter Earl
- 1946 - Frank Butters
- 1947 - Fred Darling
- 1948 - Noel Murless
- 1949 - Frank Butters
- 1950 - Charles Semblat
- 1951 - Jack Jarvis
- 1952 - Marcus Marsh
- 1953 - Jack Jarvis
- 1954 - Cecil Boyd-Rochfort
- 1955 - Cecil Boyd-Rochfort
- 1956 - Charles Elsey
- 1957 - Noel Murless
- 1958 - Cecil Boyd-Rochfort
- 1959 - Noel Murless
- 1960 - Noel Murless
- 1961 - Noel Murless
- 1962 - Dick Hern
- 1963 - Paddy Prendergast
- 1964 - Paddy Prendergast
- 1965 - Paddy Prendergast
- 1966 - Vincent O'Brien
- 1967 - Noel Murless
- 1968 - Noel Murless
- 1969 - Arthur Budgett
- 1970 - Noel Murless
- 1971 - Ian Balding
- 1972 - Dick Hern
- 1973 - Noel Murless
- 1974 - Peter Walwyn
- 1975 - Peter Walwyn
- 1976 - Henry Cecil
- 1977 - Vincent O'Brien
- 1978 - Henry Cecil
- 1979 - Henry Cecil
- 1980 - Dick Hern
- 1981 - Michael Stoute
- 1982 - Henry Cecil
- 1983 - Dick Hern
- 1984 - Henry Cecil
- 1985 - Henry Cecil
- 1986 - Michael Stoute
- 1987 - Henry Cecil
- 1988 - Henry Cecil
- 1989 - Michael Stoute
- 1990 - Henry Cecil
- 1991 - Paul Cole
- 1992 - Richard Hannon Sr.
- 1993 - Henry Cecil
- 1994 - Michael Stoute
- 1995 - John Dunlop
- 1996 - Saeed bin Suroor
- 1997 - Michael Stoute
- 1998 - Saeed bin Suroor
- 1999 - Saeed bin Suroor
- 2000 - Sir Michael Stoute
- 2001 - Aidan O'Brien
- 2002 - Aidan O'Brien
- 2003 - Sir Michael Stoute
- 2004 - Saeed bin Suroor
- 2005 - Sir Michael Stoute
- 2006 - Sir Michael Stoute
- 2007 - Aidan O'Brien
- 2008 - Aidan O'Brien
- 2009 - Sir Michael Stoute
- 2010 - Richard Hannon Sr.
- 2011 - Richard Hannon Sr.
- 2012 - John Gosden
- 2013 - Richard Hannon Sr.
- 2014 - Richard Hannon Jr.
- 2015 - John Gosden
- 2016 - Aidan O'Brien
- 2017 - Aidan O'Brien
- 2018 - John Gosden
- 2019 - John Gosden
- 2020 - John Gosden
- 2021 - Charlie Appleby
- 2022 - Charlie Appleby
- 2023 - John Gosden and Thady Gosden
- 2024 - Aidan O'Brien
- 2025 - Aidan O'Brien

== Records ==
- Most titles - 12, Alec Taylor, Jr.
- Most consecutive titles - 7, Alec Taylor, Jr. (1917-1923)
- Father/Son Winners - Richard March (1897, 1998 & 1900) and Marcus March (1952), Richard Hannon Sr (1992, 2010, 2011 & 2013) and Richard Hannon Jr (2014), John Gosden (2012, 2015, 2018, 2019, 2020, 2023) and Thady Gosden (2023)
- Longest time between first and last win - Sir Michael Stoute 28 years (1981-2009)
- Nationality - Three Irish based trainers have won the championship: Paddy Prendergast (1963-65), Vincent O'Brien (1966 & 1977) and Aidan O'Brien (2001, 2002, 2007, 2008, 2016 2017, 2024 & 2025) while French based Charles Semblat won the championship in 1950. In 1901 American trainer John Huggins was the first trainer from outside England to win the championship. Championship winner Cecil Boyd-Rochfort who trained out of Newmarket was Irish born while Frank Butters who was also Newmarket based was born in Vienna, Austria. Saeed bin Suroor is of Emirati nationality having been born in Dubai, United Arab Emirates. 1913 Champion trainer Richard Wootton who was born in Australia trained horses in Australia, the UK, and South Africa. Walter Earl was born in Bohemia in the present-day Czech Republic. Ian Balding the 1971 winner was born in the US, but his family returned to the UK in 1945.

== See also ==
- British flat racing Champion Jockey
- British flat racing Champion Apprentice
- British flat racing Champion Owner
- British jump racing Champion Trainer
- British jump racing Champion Jockey
- Leading sire in Great Britain & Ireland
