= Bob Sievier =

British racehorse trainer and owner

Robert Standish Sievier (1860–1939) was a British racehorse trainer, bookmaker, racehorse owner, gambler and journalist, who also became well known in Australia. He was Champion Trainer in 1902. He was principally known for his training of the filly Sceptre, who he also owned during the 1902 season in which she became the only horse to win four English Classic Races outright.
