= Charles Peck =

British racehorse trainer

Charles Peck (1873 - 1941) was a British racehorse trainer. He was Champion Trainer in 1915.
