= Richard Dawson (racehorse trainer) =

Irish racehorse trainer

Personal information
- Born: 27 November 1865 Ireland
- Died: 15 September 1955 (aged 89) Hampshire
- Occupation: Trainer

Horse racing career
- Sport: Horse racing

Major racing wins
- British Classic Race wins as trainer: 2000 Guineas (1); Epsom Derby (3); Epsom Oaks (2); St Leger (2)

Racing awards
- British flat racing Champion Trainer 1916, 1924, 1929

Significant horses
- Drogheda, Silver Tag, Mumtaz Mahal, Fifinella, Diophon, Brownhylda, Salmon-Trout, Trigo, Blenheim

Richard Cecil Dawson (1865 – 1955) was an Irish owner and trainer of racehorses.

From his home and racing stable in Cloghran, Dawson went to Lambourn, England in 1897 and set up shop at Whatcombe Stables in Berkshire near Wantage. He brought with him the steeplechase horse Drogheda who won the 1898 Grand National. Dawson left Whatcombe Stables to train at Scotland Farm on Salisbury Plain in 1917 but soon returned to his old base though he took Lagrange at Newmarket for a few months in 1918 as an additional yard. His many successful owners included newspaper publisher Sir Edward Hulton (1869–1925) but contrary to popular myth he never trained for him privately or at Newmarket. At Whatcombe after the War his horses for ten years included those of HH Aga Khan III.

Dick Dawson was British Champion Trainer in 1916, 1924 and 1929, winning numerous important races including four Epsom Derbys, three St. Leger Stakes, one 2,000 Guineas, and two Epsom Oaks.

Dawson owned Blandford, the English champion sire in 1934, 1935 and 1938 who sired Bahram, the 1935 English Triple Crown champion. Blandford stood at both Whatcombe and Cloghran. The latter is a townland circa 5 miles from Dublin city centre and less than a mile from Dublin airport. In Dawson's time it would have been a rural agricultural area. His former yard is still there today at the end of Turnapin Lane, a former turnpike road.
