= Peter Gilpin =

Irish racehorse trainer

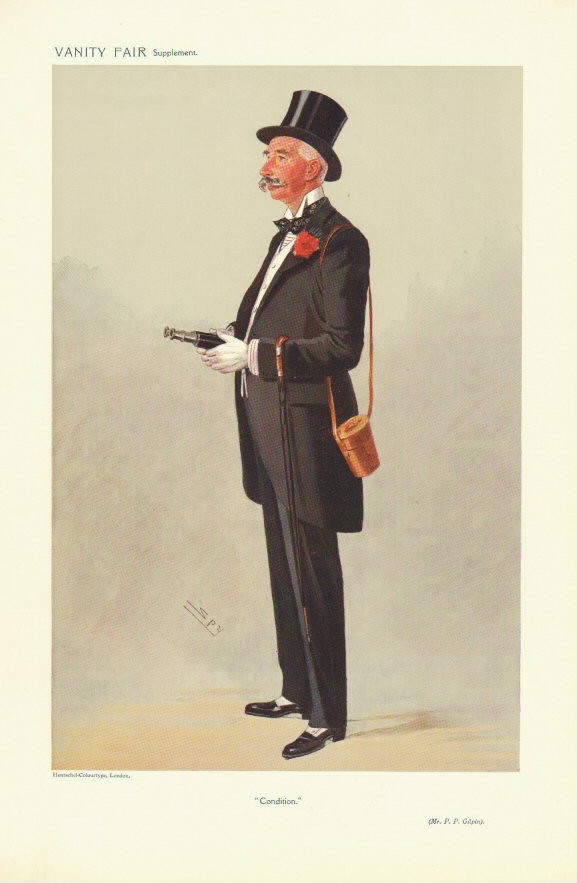
"Condition", caricature by Spy in Vanity Fair in 1908.

Peter Valentine Purcell Gilpin (né Purcell; 12 December 1858 – 9 November 1929), known as P. P. Gilpin, was an Irish racehorse trainer. He was Champion Trainer in 1904 and his most notable winner was the filly Pretty Polly who won the Fillies Triple Crown in 1904. He also trained Comrade, the winner of the inaugural Prix de l'Arc de Triomphe in 1920.

He was born in 1858 at Pau, France, the son of Capt. Peter Valentine Purcell of Halverstown, Carragh, County Kildare, and Agnes Maria Lethbridge, daughter of Sir John Lethbridge, 3rd Baronet. He was Roman Catholic. His father died in 1864 and his mother remarried in 1866 Henry St. John Vaughan Thomas-Le-Marchant.

He was educated at Prior Park College, Bath.

In 1883, he married Amy Mary Louisa, daughter of Capt. Henry Meux-Smith. He and his wife adopted the surname Gilpin as a condition of her inheriting the entailed Hockliffe Grange estate from her uncle Sir Richard Gilpin, 1st Baronet. In the late 1880s, they left Bedfordshire and settled in Ireland, where he began training racehorses while living at Whiteleas near Kildare.

After moving to Devon, Gilpin won a fortune on bets when his horse Clarehaven won the Cesarewitch Handicap in 1900. Gilpin used the proceeds to fund the construction of a new, purpose-built yard in Newmarket, Suffolk which he named after his winner. The name has remained with the stable since then.

He died in 1929 in Dunshaughlin, County Meath.

== Arms ==
Coat of arms of Peter Gilpin

Notes
Granted 13 February 1884 by Sir John Bernard Burke, Ulster King of Arms.
Crest
In front of three tilting spears points upwards one in pale two in saltire Proper as many mascles interlaced fessways Or
Escutcheon
Or a boar passant Sable in chief two roses Gules barbed and seeded Proper a canton Azure for difference
Motto
Une Foy Mesme ("One and the same faith")
