= Atty Persse =

British racehorse trainer (1869–1960)

Henry Seymour "Atty" Persse (1869–1960) was a British racehorse trainer. He was Champion Trainer in 1930.

Persse was commissioned a second-lieutenant in the Duke of Lancaster's Own Yeomanry on 28 June 1899, but resigned his commission on 13 September 1902.

He co-wrote the novel Trainer and Temptress which formed the basis for the 1925 silent film of the same name.
