= Jannette =

British Thoroughbred racehorse

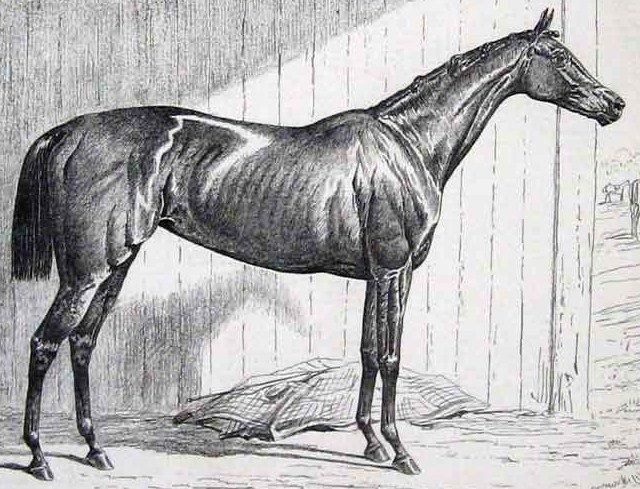
- Jannette, from the Illustrated London News, June 1878
- Sire: Lord Clifden
- Grandsire: Newminster
- Dam: Chevisaunce
- Damsire: Stockwell
- Sex: Mare
- Foaled: 1875
- Country: United Kingdom of Great Britain and Ireland
- Colour: Bay
- Breeder: Evelyn Boscawen, 6th Viscount Falmouth
- Owner: Lord Falmouth
- Trainer: Mathew Dawson
- Record: 23:17–4–1

Major wins
- Richmond Stakes (1877)); Criterion Stakes (1877); Epsom Oaks (1878); Jersey Stakes (1878); Yorkshire Oaks (1878); St. Leger Stakes (1878); Park Hill Stakes (1878); Champion Stakes (1878); Newmarket Oaks (1878); Jockey Club Cup (1879)

Awards
- Leading British money winner (1878)

Jannette (1875–1905), was a British Thoroughbred racehorse and broodmare who won two British Classic Races in 1878. She was one of the leading British two-year-olds of 1877 when she was unbeaten in seven races including the Richmond Stakes at Goodwood. On her first appearance as a three-year-old she was beaten by Pilgrimage in the 1000 Guineas at Newmarket but reversed the form with that filly to win the Oaks at Epsom a month later. Later in the season she defeated some of the season's best colts to win the St. Leger Stakes at Doncaster and added a victory in the Champion Stakes against some of the leading older horses. She was less effective in 1879 but won the Jockey Club Cup on her final appearance. She was then retired to stud, where she had some success.

== Background ==
Jannette was a powerfully-built bay mare bred her owner Evelyn Boscawen, 6th Viscount Falmouth. She was sired by the 1863 St Leger winner Lord Clifden, whose other progeny included the classic winners Petrarch, Wenlock and Hawthornden as well as the leading sire Hampton. Her dam, Chevisaunce, was a daughter of Paradigm, an outstanding broodmare who also produced the Triple Crown winners Lord Lyon and Achievement.

Jannette was trained by Mathew Dawson at his Heath House stable in Newmarket and ridden to her important successes by Fred Archer.

== Racing career ==
=== 1877: two-year-old season ===
As a two-year-old, Jannette began her career in June by winning the twenty-fifth Triennial Stakes at Royal Ascot and then took the inaugural running of the Richmond Stakes at Goodwood in July, winning "in a common canter" from Spark. In autumn she walked over in the Wentworth Stakes at Doncaster Racecourse and was then campaigned at Newmarket Racecourse. At the first October meeting she recorded another walkover win in the Buckenham Produce Stakes. At the second October meeting she established herself as a contender for the following season's classics when she won the Clearwell Stakes by four lengths from the French colt Insulaire, as well as walking over in the Bretby Stakes. At the Houghton meeting two weeks later she carried a seven-pound weight penalty and won the Criterion Stakes by a neck after a prolonged struggle with the filly Clementine. The unplaced horses included an unnamed colt later known as Sefton, which won the following year's Derby. Jannette ended the season unbeaten in seven races with earnings of £5,266. She was one of two outstanding juvenile fillies to race in England in 1877, the other being Lord Lonsdale's Pilgrimage, which won the Dewhurst Stakes.

=== 1878: three-year-old season ===
In May 1878, Jannette was matched against Pilgrimage in the 1000 Guineas over Newmarket's Rowley Mile course. Lord Lonsdale's filly was the 4/5 favourite after defeating the colts in the 2000 Guineas two days earlier, while Jannette was an outsider on 35/1. Jannette started badly but produced a strong finish to take second place from Clementine a furlong from the finish. She was unable to catch Pilgrimage, however, and finished second by three quarters of a length.

Jannette and Pilgrimage met again in the hundredth running of the Oaks over one and a half miles at Epsom on 7 June. The race was run in fine weather, after early heavy rain, in front of a large crowd which included the Prince of Wales. Ridden by Archer, Jannette started at odds of 13/8 in a field of eight runners with Pilgrimage being made the even money favourite. Jannette raced in second place behind her stable companion Pulsatilla, before taking the lead early in the straight. Pilgrimage, who appeared to struggle on the downhill section of the course, emerged as a challenger and the two favourites drew clear of the rest. Jannette held off the Guineas winner to win by a length, with Clementine six lengths back in third. Her success gave Falmouth a third winner in the race and was enthusiastically received by the Epsom crowd. Later in the month, Jannette was matched against colts in the Ascot Derby and finished third to Insulaire, who been runner-up in The Derby. On the last day of the same Royal Ascot meeting, Jannette won the second year of the Twenty-fifth Triennial Stakes, the race now known as the Jersey Stakes. At York Racecourse in August, Jannette returned to competing against her own age and sex and won the Yorkshire Oaks very easily from her only opponent, leading to heavy betting on the filly's prospects in the St Leger.

At Doncaster on 11 September, Jannette was made 5/2 favourite for the St Leger against thirteen opponents. The race was highly anticipated, with the leading contenders also including Insulaire and Jannette's stable companion Childeric. The filly took the lead early in the straight, opened a clear lead, and won easily by four lengths from Childeric and Master Kildare. Jannette's victory provoked one of her admirers to publish a poem ending with the lines:

So deaf to each sinister story
And staunch in the love of our pet
We'll stand, win or lose, death or glory
Still true to the charming Jannette.

Two days later, she won the Park Hill Stakes over the same course and distance. At Newmarket in October Jannette ran against her stable companion Silvio, the 1877 Epsom Derby winner in the Champion Stakes. The race featured the appearance of three St Leger winners, with Jannette and Silvio being joined by the 1876 Doncaster winner Petrarch. Silvio led from the start until Jannette moved alongside him in the final quarter mile and the two Dawson runners drew away from the field. The filly prevailed by a neck, with a gap of ten lengths back to Kaleidoscope in third. Later at the same course, Jannette won the fourteen furlong Newmarket Oaks.

Jannette ended the season with eight wins from ten races and prize money of almost £16,000, the highest for any British horse in 1878.

=== 1879: four-year-old season ===
In June 1879, Jannette started 5/1 third favourite for the Gold Cup but finished a distant fourth of the six runners behind Isonomy, Insulaire and Touchet. At the same meeting, she won the third year of the Twenty-fifth Triennial Stakes from Eau de Vie. In August, Jannette finished third to Rockhampton and Touchet in the York Cup, leading to speculation that she had either lost her form, or been fortunate to compete against unusually weak competition in 1878.

Jannette's best runs of 1879 came in the autumn. At Doncaster in September she finished second by a neck to Rylstone in the Queen's Plate. In the Doncaster Cup two days later she was again matched against Isonomy, the year's leading horse, at weight-for-age. In a rough race, she took the lead inside the final furlong before being overtaken by Isonomy in the closing stages and beaten by a head. Her final appearance came at Newmarket a month later when she contested the two and a quarter mile Jockey Club Cup. She won the race, beating the three-year-old filly Out-of-Bounds by half a length, with Insulaire and Touchet unplaced. After the race, Jannette was retired to stud "full of honours".

== Breeding record ==
Few of Jannette's foals made an impact as racehorses, but she did have some influence as a broodmare. Her son Janissary (sired by Isonomy), won the St. James's Palace Stakes and sired the 1898 Derby winner Jeddah whose mother was Jannette's racecourse rival Pilgrimage. Her daughter, Jane Harding, was exported to Argentina, where she produced the local classic winners Talma and Valero. Another daughter, Jennifer, was the ancestor of the Deutsches Derby winner Birkhahn. Jannette did not produce a foal after 1894 and died in January 1905.

== Pedigree ==
Pedigree of Jannette (GB), bay mare, 1875
Sire Lord Clifden (GB) 1860	Newminster; 1848	Touchstone	Camel
Sire Lord Clifden (GB) 1860	Newminster; 1848	Touchstone	Banter
Sire Lord Clifden (GB) 1860	Newminster; 1848	Beeswing	Dr Syntax
Sire Lord Clifden (GB) 1860	Newminster; 1848	Beeswing	Ardrossan mare
Sire Lord Clifden (GB) 1860	The Slave; 1852	Melbourne	Humphrey Clinker
Sire Lord Clifden (GB) 1860	The Slave; 1852	Melbourne	Cervantes mare
Sire Lord Clifden (GB) 1860	The Slave; 1852	Volley	Voltaire
Sire Lord Clifden (GB) 1860	The Slave; 1852	Volley	Martha Lynn
Dam Chevisaunce (GB) 1868	Stockwell; 1849	The Baron	Birdcatcher
Dam Chevisaunce (GB) 1868	Stockwell; 1849	The Baron	Echidna
Dam Chevisaunce (GB) 1868	Stockwell; 1849	Pocahontas	Glencoe
Dam Chevisaunce (GB) 1868	Stockwell; 1849	Pocahontas	Marpessa
Dam Chevisaunce (GB) 1868	Paradigm; 1852	Paragone	Touchstone
Dam Chevisaunce (GB) 1868	Paradigm; 1852	Paragone	Hoyden
Dam Chevisaunce (GB) 1868	Paradigm; 1852	Ellen Horne	Redshank
Dam Chevisaunce (GB) 1868	Paradigm; 1852	Ellen Horne	Delhi (Family:1-j)

- Jannette was inbred 3x4 to Touchstone, meaning that this stallion appears in both the third and fourth generations of her pedigree.
