= Dewhurst Stakes =

Flat horse race in Britain

- Class: Group 1
- Location: Rowley Mile; Newmarket, England
- Inaugurated: 1875
- Race type: Flat / Thoroughbred
- Sponsor: Darley Stud
- Website: Newmarket

Race information
- Distance: 7f (1,408 metres)
- Surface: Turf
- Track: Straight
- Qualification: Two-year-olds excluding geldings
- Weight: 9 st 3 lb Allowances; 3 lb for fillies
- Purse: £500,000 (2025); 1st: £283,550

Dewhurst Stakes
2026
Darkness Falls	Desert Castle	Great Barrier Reef

Previous years
2025
Gewan	Gstaad	Distant Storm
2024
Shadow Of Light	Expanded	Ancient Truth
2023
City Of Troy	Alyanaabi	Eben Shaddad
2022
Chaldean	Royal Scotsman	Nostrum
2021
Native Trail	Dubawi Legend	Bayside Boy

2020-2011
2020
St Mark's Basilica	Wembley	Thunder Moon
2019
Pinatubo	Arizona	Wichita
2018
Too Darn Hot	Advertise	Anthony Van Dyck
2017
U S Navy Flag	Mendelssohn	Seahenge
2016
Churchill	Lancaster Bomber	Blue Point
2015
Air Force Blue	Massaat	Sanus Per Aquam
2014
Belardo	Kodi Bear	Smuggler's Cove
2013
War Command	Cable Bay	Outstrip
2012
Dawn Approach	Leitir Mor	George Vancouver
2011
Parish Hall	Power	Most Improved

2010-2001
2010
Frankel	Roderic O'Connor	Glor Na Mara
2009
Beethoven	Fencing Master	Xtension
2008
Intense Focus	Lord Shanakill	Finjaan
2007
New Approach	Fast Company	Raven's Pass
2006
Teofilo	Holy Roman Emperor	Strategic Prince
2005
Sir Percy	Horatio Nelson	Opera Cape
2004
Shamardal	Oratorio	Montgomery's Arch
2003
Milk It Mick	Three Valleys	Haafhd
2002
Tout Seul	Tomahawk	Trade Fair
2001
Rock Of Gibraltar	Landseer	Tendulkar

2000-1991
2000
Tobougg	Noverre	Tempest
1999
Distant Music	Brahms	Zentsov Street
1998
Mujahid	Auction House	Stravinsky
1997
Xaar	Tamarisk	Impressionist
1996
In Command	Musical Pursuit	Air Express
1995
Alhaarth	Danehill Dancer	Tagula
1994
Pennekamp	Green Perfume	Eltish
1993
Grand Lodge	Stonehatch	Nicolotte
1992
Zafonic	Inchinor	Firm Pledge
1991
Dr Devious	Great Palm	Thourios

1990-1983
1990
Generous	Bog Trotter	Surrealist
1989
Dashing Blade	Call To Arms	Anshan
1988
Prince Of Dance	Scenic	Saratogan
1986
Ajdal	Shady Heights	Genghiz
1985
Huntingdale	Bakharoff	Sure Blade
1984
Kala Dancer	Law Society	Local Suitor
1983
El Gran Senor	Rainbow Quest	Siberian Express

The Dewhurst Stakes is a Group 1 flat horse race in Great Britain open to two-year-old colts and fillies. It is run on the Rowley Mile at Newmarket over a distance of 7 furlongs (1,408 metres), and it is scheduled to take place each year in October.

It is Britain's most prestigious race for juvenile horses. The leading participants usually become major contenders for the following season's Classics.

== History ==
The event was founded by Thomas Gee, who was a close friend of Karl Pearson's father. It was established in 1875 and was originally titled the "Dewhurst Plate". It is named after Gee's Dewhurst Stud at Wadhurst. The first four winners all went on to win one or more of the next year's Classics.

The race was formerly staged during Newmarket's Champions' Day meeting in mid-October. It became part of a new fixture called Future Champions Day in 2011.

The Dewhurst Stakes was added to the Breeders' Cup Challenge series in 2011. The winner was given an automatic invitation to compete in the Breeders' Cup Juvenile Turf. It was removed from the series in 2012.

The most recent winner of the Dewhurst Stakes to achieve a Classic victory is City Of Troy, the winner of the Epsom Derby in 2024.

== Records ==
Leading jockey (10 wins):

- Lester Piggott – Crepello (1956), Follow Suit (1962), Ribofilio (1968), Nijinsky (1969), Crowned Prince (1971), Cellini (1973), The Minstrel (1976), Try My Best (1977), Monteverdi (1979), Diesis (1982)

Leading trainer (8 wins):

- John Porter – Paradox (1884), Ormonde (1885), Friar's Balsam (1887), Orme (1891), Matchbox (1893), Vesuvian (1896), Hawfinch (1897), Frontier (1898)
- Frank Butters – Toboggan (1927), Mrs Rustom (1933), Hairan (1934), Bala Hissar (1935), Sultan Mahomed (1936), Umiddad (1942), Paper Weight (1944), Migoli (1946)
- Aidan O'Brien - Rock of Gibraltar (2001), Beethoven (2009), War Command (2013), Air Force Blue (2015), Churchill (2016), U S Navy Flag (2017), St Mark's Basilica (2020), City of Troy (2023)

Leading owner (including part ownership) (8 wins):

- HH Aga Khan III – Salmon-Trout (1923), Zionist (1924), Firdaussi (1931), Mrs Rustom (1933), Hairan (1934), Bala Hissar (1935), Umiddad (1942), Migoli (1946)
- Sue Magnier, Michael Tabor - Rock of Gibraltar (2001), Beethoven (2009), War Command (2013), Air Force Blue (2015), Churchill (2016), U S Navy Flag (2017), St Mark's Basilica (2020), City of Troy (2023)

== Winners ==
Year	Winner	Jockey	Trainer	Owner	Time
1875	the Mineral colt	Charles Maidment	Joseph Hayhoe	Alexander Baltazzi	
1876	Chamant	Jem Goater	Thomas Jennings	Frederic de Lagrange	
1877	Pilgrimage‡	Harry Constable	Joseph Cannon	4th Earl of Lonsdale	
1878	Wheel of Fortune‡	Fred Archer	Mathew Dawson	6th Viscount Falmouth	
1879	Grace Cup	Edward Rossiter	C Blanton	A C Barclay	
1880	Bal Gal	Fred Archer	Mathew Dawson	6th Viscount Falmouth	
1881	Dutch Oven‡	Fred Archer	Mathew Dawson	6th Viscount Falmouth	
1882	Ladislas	Hampton	Tom Jennings, Jr.	C J Lefevre	
1883	Queen Adelaide‡	Fred Webb	James Jewitt	Sir J Willoughby	
1884	the Casuistry colt	Fred Archer	John Porter	William Broderick Cloete	
1885	Ormonde	Fred Archer	John Porter	1st Duke of Westminster	
1886	Reve d'Or	Charles Wood	Alec Taylor Sr.	8th Duke of Beaufort	
1887	Friar's Balsam	Tom Cannon Sr.	John Porter	Sir Frederick Johnstone	
1888	Donovan	Fred Barrett	George Dawson	6th Duke of Portland	
1889	Le Nord	Fred Barrett	Alfred Hayhoe	Leopold de Rothschild	
1890	Corstorphine	Fred Rickaby, Sr.	Mathew Dawson	5th Earl of Rosebery	
1891	Orme	George Barrett	John Porter	1st Duke of Westminster	
1892	Meddler	Mornington Cannon	Joseph Cannon	George Alexander Baird	
1893	Matchbox	Mornington Cannon	John Porter	Lord Alington	
1894	Raconteur	Tommy Loates	James Jewitt	Harry McCalmont	
1895	St Frusquin	Fred Pratt	Alfred Hayhoe	Leopold de Rothschild	
1896	Vesuvian	Mornington Cannon	John Porter	Sir Frederick Johnstone	
1897	Hawfinch	Sam Loates	John Porter	Horatio Bottomley	
1898	Frontier	Mornington Cannon	John Porter	1st Duke of Westminster	1:31.80
1899	Democrat	Tod Sloan	John Huggins	Lord William Beresford	
1900	Lord Bobs	Sam Loates	William Waugh	John Blundell Maple	
1901	Game Chick	Johnny Reiff	John Huggins	Eustace Loder	1:34.00
1902	Rock Sand	Danny Maher	George Blackwell	Sir James Miller	1:27.60
1903	Henry the First	Otto Madden	Albert Gilbert	J Musker	
1904	Rouge Croix	Frank Bullock	John Brewer	R H Henning	
1905	Picton	William Higgs	G Edwards	James Lionel Dugdale	
1906	My Pet	Otto Madden	Dawson Waugh	Walter Raphael	
1907	Rhodora‡	Billy Bullock	Fred McCabe	Richard Croker	
1908	Bayardo	Danny Maher	Alec Taylor Jr.	Alfred W. Cox	
1909	Lemberg	Danny Maher	Alec Taylor Jr.	Alfred W. Cox	
1910 (Note: The 1910 and 1988 races were dead-heats) (dh)	King William; Phryxus	Frank Wootton; Danny Maher	George Lambton; Alec Taylor Jr.	17th Earl of Derby; Alfred W. Cox	
1911	White Star	Frank Wootton	Charles Morton	Jack Barnato Joel	1:31.80
1912	Louvois	William Saxby	Dawson Waugh	Walter Raphael	1:25.40
1913	Kennymore	Albert Whalley	Alec Taylor Jr.	Sir John Thursby	
1914	Let Fly	Steve Donoghue	Jack Robinson	William Hall Walker	1:29.40
1915	Atheling	Frank Bullock	Dick Dawson	Edward Hulton	1:30.20
1916	Telephus	Steve Donoghue	Alec Taylor Jr.	Alfred W. Cox	
1917	My Dear‡	Steve Donoghue	Alec Taylor Jr.	Alfred W. Cox	
1918	Knight of Blyth	Albert Whalley	Felix Leach	F Willey	
1919	Prince Galahad	Brownie Carslake	Atty Persse	L Robinson	
1920	No race				
1921	Lembach	Frank Bullock	Reg Day	E Moore	
1922	Hurry Off	Brownie Carslake	Atty Persse	2nd Duke of Westminster	1:29.00
1923	Salmon-Trout	Grorge Hulme	Dick Dawson	Aga Khan III	1:30.00
1924	Zionist	Vic Smyth	Dick Dawson	Aga Khan III	
1925	Review Order	Harry Beasley Jr.	Atty Persse	Lord Barnby	1:29.80
1926	Money Maker	Charlie Elliott	Lord George Dundas	Mrs C Beatty	1:29.60
1927	Toboggan	Tommy Weston	Frank Butters	17th Earl of Derby	
1928	Brienz	Bobby Jones	Joseph Lawson	Somerville Tattersall	1:28.20
1929	Grace Dalrymple‡	Freddie Fox	Fred Darling	Lord Dewar	1:24.00
1930	Sangre	Harry Beasley Jr.	Atty Persse	W Chanler	1:24.60
1931	Firdaussi	Michael Beary	Dick Dawson	Aga Khan III	1:27.40
1932	Hyperion	Tommy Weston	George Lambton	17th Earl of Derby	1:30.20
1933	Mrs Rustom‡	Michael Beary	Frank Butters	Aga Khan III	1:26.80
1934	Hairan	Freddie Fox	Frank Butters	Aga Khan III	1:26.20
1935	Bala Hissar	Charlie Smirke	Frank Butters	Aga Khan III	1:29.80
1936	Sultan Mohamed	Gordon Richards	Frank Butters	Aly Khan	1:28.40
1937	Manorite	Eph Smith	Peter Thrale	D Kennedy	1:31.00
1938	Casanova	Rufus Beasley	Cecil Boyd-Rochfort	Zia Wernher	1:28.20
1939	No race (Note: The 1939 race was cancelled due to the outbreak of World War II)				
1940	Fettes	Gordon Richards	Fred Darling	R Macdonald-Buchanan	1:29.60
1941	Canyonero	Tommy Carey	Walter Nightingall	F Bezner	1:29.80
1942	Umiddad	Doug Smith	Frank Butters	Aga Khan III	1:29.00
1943	Effervescence	Gordon Richards	Jack Colling	M Hartigan	1:29.20
1944	Paper Weight	Arthur Wragg	Frank Butters	Alfred Butt	1:33.00
1945	Hypericum‡	Doug Smith	Cecil Boyd-Rochfort	King George VI	1:28.20
1946	Migoli	Gordon Richards	Frank Butters	Aga Khan III	1:29.00
1947	Pride of India	Joe Sime	John E Watts	Jim Joel	1:29.00
1948	Royal Forest	Gordon Richards	Noel Murless	R Macdonald-Buchanan	1:29.80
1949	Emperor	Charlie Elliott	Charles Semblat	Marcel Boussac	1:28.00
1950	Turco	Harry Carr	Cecil Boyd-Rochfort	William Woodward Sr.	1:30.20
1951	Marsyad	Rae Johnstone	Charles Semblat	Marcel Boussac	1:27.20
1952	Pinza	Gordon Richards	Norman Bertie	Victor Sassoon	1:25.22
1953	Infatuation	Ken Gethin	Vic Smyth	Sir M McAlpine	1:28.85
1954	My Smokey	Doug Smith	Jack Watts	Mrs D Robinson	1:28.97
1955	Dacian	Bill Snaith	Harry Cottrill	Lionel Brook Holliday	1:28.74
1956	Crepello	Lester Piggott	Noel Murless	Victor Sassoon	1:32.65
1957	Torbella	Scobie Breasley	W Clout	Comte de Chambure	1:31.03
1958	Billum	Eddie Hide	Charles Elsey	W Humble	1:30.35
1959	Ancient Lights	Eph Smith	Ted Leader	Jim Joel	1:26.60
1960	Bounteous	Joe Sime	Rufus Beasley	Mrs H Leggatt	1:34.81
1961	River Chanter	Joe Mercer	George Todd	R Sigtia	1:28.12
1962	Follow Suit	Lester Piggott	Noel Murless	Giles Loder	1:28.99
1963	King's Lane	Joe Sime	Samuel Hall	L Chamberlain	1:28.50
1964	Silly Season	Geoff Lewis	Ian Balding	Paul Mellon	1:30.06
1965	Pretendre	Ron Hutchinson	Jack Jarvis	Claude Lilley	1:27.90
1966	Dart Board	Doug Smith	Gordon Richards	Michael Sobell	1:30.10
1967	Hametus	Frankie Durr	Walter Nightingall	Lady Beaverbrook	1:29.31
1968	Ribofilio	Lester Piggott	Fulke Johnson Houghton	Charles Engelhard	1:32.10
1969	Nijinsky	Lester Piggott	Vincent O'Brien	Charles Engelhard	1:29.90
1970	Mill Reef	Geoff Lewis	Ian Balding	Paul Mellon	1:30.10
1971	Crowned Prince	Lester Piggott	Bernard van Cutsem	Frank McMahon	1:29.35
1972	Lunchtime	Pat Eddery	Peter Walwyn	R. Poole	1:29.01
1973	Cellini	Lester Piggott	Vincent O'Brien	Charles St George	1:29.91
1974	Grundy	Pat Eddery	Peter Walwyn	Carlo Vittadini	1:33.67
1975	Wollow	Gianfranco Dettori	Henry Cecil	Carlo d'Alessio	1:25.83
1976	The Minstrel	Lester Piggott	Vincent O'Brien	Robert Sangster	1:28.35
1977	Try My Best	Lester Piggott	Vincent O'Brien	Robert Sangster	1:28.72
1978	Tromos	Kipper Lynch	Bruce Hobbs	George Cambanis	1:24.75
1979	Monteverdi	Lester Piggott	Vincent O'Brien	Robert Sangster	1:26.06
1980	Storm Bird	Pat Eddery	Vincent O'Brien	Robert Sangster	1:29.19
1981	Wind and Wuthering	Philip Waldron	Henry Candy	Richard & Charles Cyzer	1:26.81
1982	Diesis	Lester Piggott	Henry Cecil	Lord Howard de Walden	1:27.46
1983	El Gran Senor	Pat Eddery	Vincent O'Brien	Robert Sangster	1:24.90
1984	Kala Dancer	Geoff Baxter	Ben Hanbury	Ravi Tikkoo	1:27.68
1985	Huntingdale	Michael Hills	Jeremy Hindley	Mrs P. J. Threlfall	1:26.15
1986	Ajdal	Walter Swinburn	Michael Stoute	Sheikh Mohammed	1:28.99
1987	No race (Note: The 1987 running was cancelled because of extreme winds and structural damage)				
1988 (dh)	Prince of Dance; Scenic	Willie Carson; Michael Hills	Neil Graham; Barry Hills	Michael Sobell; Sheikh Mohammed	1:27.66
1989	Dashing Blade	John Matthias	Ian Balding	Jeff Smith	1:25.43
1990	Generous	Richard Quinn	Paul Cole	Fahd Salman	1:28.43
1991	Dr Devious	Willie Carson	Peter Chapple-Hyam	Luciano Gaucci	1:23.45
1992	Zafonic	Pat Eddery	André Fabre	Khalid Abdullah	1:23.61
1993	Grand Lodge	Pat Eddery	William Jarvis	Lord Howard de Walden	1:28.27
1994	Pennekamp	Thierry Jarnet	André Fabre	Sheikh Mohammed	1:25.41
1995	Alhaarth	Willie Carson	Dick Hern	Hamdan Al Maktoum	1:24.64
1996	In Command	Michael Hills	Barry Hills	Maktoum Al Maktoum	1:25.93
1997	Xaar	Olivier Peslier	André Fabre	Khalid Abdullah	1:24.81
1998	Mujahid	Richard Hills	John Dunlop	Hamdan Al Maktoum	1:25.31
1999	Distant Music	Michael Hills	Barry Hills	Khalid Abdullah	1:26.84
2000	Tobougg	Craig Williams	Mick Channon	Ahmed Al Maktoum	1:27.93
2001	Rock of Gibraltar	Michael Kinane	Aidan O'Brien	Ferguson / Magnier	1:28.70
2002	Tout Seul	Stephen Carson	Fulke Johnson Houghton	Eden Racing	1:23.39
2003	Milk It Mick	Darryll Holland	Jamie Osborne	Paul Dixon	1:25.22
2004	Shamardal	Kevin Darley	Mark Johnston	Gainsborough Stud	1:27.16
2005	Sir Percy	Martin Dwyer	Marcus Tregoning	Anthony Pakenham	1:26.52
2006	Teofilo	Kevin Manning	Jim Bolger	Jackie Bolger	1:26.12
2007	New Approach	Kevin Manning	Jim Bolger	Bolger / Sheikh Moh'd	1:25.29
2008	Intense Focus	Kevin Manning	Jim Bolger	Jackie Bolger	1:23.33
2009	Beethoven	Ryan Moore	Aidan O'Brien	Tabor / Smith / Magnier	1:23.49
2010	Frankel	Tom Queally	Henry Cecil	Khalid Abdullah	1:25.73
2011	Parish Hall	Kevin Manning	Jim Bolger	Jackie Bolger	1:23.81
2012	Dawn Approach	Kevin Manning	Jim Bolger	Godolphin	1:24.00
2013	War Command	Joseph O'Brien	Aidan O'Brien	Allen / Tabor / Smith / Magnier	1:25.06
2014	Belardo	Andrea Atzeni	Roger Varian	Prince A. A. Faisal	1:27.31
2015	Air Force Blue	Ryan Moore	Aidan O'Brien	Tabor / Smith / Magnier	1:25.34
2016	Churchill	Ryan Moore	Aidan O'Brien	Tabor / Smith / Magnier	1:23.80
2017	U S Navy Flag	Ryan Moore	Aidan O'Brien	Tabor / Smith / Magnier	1:22.37
2018	Too Darn Hot	Frankie Dettori	John Gosden	Andrew Lloyd Webber	1:24.35
2019	Pinatubo	William Buick	Charlie Appleby	Godolphin	1:26.55
2020	St Mark's Basilica	Frankie Dettori	Aidan O'Brien	Tabor / Smith / Magnier	1:25.24
2021	Native Trail	William Buick	Charlie Appleby	Godolphin	1:24.82
2022	Chaldean	Frankie Dettori	Andrew Balding	Juddmonte	1:22.54
2023	City of Troy	Ryan Moore	Aidan O'Brien	Magnier / Tabor / Smith	1:24.85
2024	Shadow of Light	William Buick	Charlie Appleby	Godolphin	1:26.70
2025	Gewan	James Doyle	Andrew Balding	Zhang Yuesheng	1:23.39
2026	Darkness Falls	Ryan Moore	Aidan O'Brien	Westerberg / Magnier / Tabor / Smith	1:22.47

A ‡ designates a filly.

== See also ==
- Horse racing in Great Britain
- List of British flat horse races
- Recurring sporting events established in 1875 – this race is included under its original title, Dewhurst Plate.
