= Evelyn Boscawen =

Evelyn Boscawen may refer to:

- Evelyn Boscawen, 7th Viscount Falmouth (1847–1918), British peer and British Army officer
- Evelyn Boscawen, 6th Viscount Falmouth (1819–1889), race horse breeder
