= Richmond Stakes =

Flat horse race in Britain

- Class: Group 2
- Location: Goodwood Racecourse; W. Sussex, England
- Inaugurated: 1877
- Race type: Flat / Thoroughbred
- Sponsor: Markel Group
- Website: Goodwood

Race information
- Distance: 6f (1,207 metres)
- Surface: Turf
- Track: Straight
- Qualification: Two-year-old colts and geldings
- Weight: 9 st 2 lb Penalties; 3 lb for G1 / G2 winners
- Purse: £175,000 (2025); 1st: £99,243

Richmond Stakes
2026
Man's Best Friend	Adaay Of Scarlett	Night In Vegas

Previous years
2025
Coppull	Puerto Rico	Havana Hurricane
2024
Black Forza	The Strikin Viking	Intrusively
2023
Vandeek	Ballymount Boy	Toca Madera
2022
Royal Scotsman	Al Karrar	Chateau
2021
Asymmetric	Khunan	Gubbass

2020-2011
2020
Supremacy	Yazaman	Lauded
2019
Golden Horde	Threat	Royal Dornoch
2018
Land Force	Marie's Diamond	Shine So Bright
2017
Barraquero	Nebo	Cardsharp
2016
Mehmas	Blue Point	Intelligence Cross
2015
Shalaa	Tasleet	Steady Pace
2014
Ivawood	Louie de Palma	Jungle Cat
2013
Saayerr	Cable Bay	Thunder Strike
2012
Heavy Metal	Master Of War	Cay Verde
2011
Harbour Watch	Bannock	Caspar Netscher

2010-2001
2010
Libranno	The Paddyman	Roayh
2009
Dick Turpin	Buzzword	Stargaze
2008
Prolific	Gallagher	Reve De Soleil
2007
Strike The Deal	Fat Boy	One Great Cat
2006
Hamoody	Bodes Galaxy	Dubai's Touch
2005
Always Hopeful	Royal Prince	Mullaad
2004
Montgomery's Arch	Mystical Land	Silver Wraith
2003
Carrizo Creek	Old Deuteronomy	Cedarberg
2002
Revenue	Checkit	Hurricane Alan
2001
Mister Cosmi	Prince Dayjur	Anna Walhaan

2000-1991
2000
Pyrus	Ceepio	Industrial Pride
1999
Bachir	Hunting Lion	Ginola's Magic
1998
Muqtarib	Sarson	Rosselli
1997
Daggers Drawn	Lord Kintyre	Bodyguard
1996
Easycall	Raphane	Roman Imp
1995
Polaris Flight	MubhijI	Kahir Almaydan
1994
Sri Pekan	Fallow	Pentire
1993
First Trump	Stonehatch	Fumo Di Londra
1992
Son Pardo	Canaska Star	Green's Bid
1991
Dilum	Showbrook	Diamond Mine

1990-1983
1990
Mac's Imp	Distinctly North	Sylva Honda
1989
Contract Law	Qui Danzig	Rushmore
1988
Heart Of Arabia	Zakhir	Weldnaas
1987
Warning	Bellefella	Lapierre
1986
Rich Charlie	Dominion Royale	Carol's Treasure
1985
Nomination	Green Desert	Stalker
1984
Primo Dominie	Overtrump	Doulab
1983
Godstone	Creag-an-Sgor	Indigo Jones

The Richmond Stakes is a Group 2 flat horse race in Great Britain open to two-year-old colts and geldings. It is run at Goodwood over a distance of 6 furlongs (1,207 metres), and it is scheduled to take place each year in late July or early August.

== History ==
The event is named after the Duke of Richmond, one of the dukedoms held by the owner of Goodwood Racecourse. It was established in 1877, and it was originally open to horses of either gender. Six of the first eight winners were ridden by the jockey Fred Archer.

Several winners of the Richmond Stakes have gone on to win one or more of the following year's Classics. The most recent was Palestine, the winner of the 2000 Guineas in 1950.

The Richmond Stakes was restricted to male horses in 1989. The race is currently held on the third day of the five-day Glorious Goodwood meeting.

== Records ==
Leading jockey (6 wins):

- Fred Archer – Jannette (1877), Wheel of Fortune (1878), Bend Or (1879), Bal Gal (1880), Dutch Oven (1881), Rosy Morn (1884)
- Lester Piggott – Romantic (1962), Swing Easy (1970), Dragonara Palace (1973), J. O. Tobin (1976), Persian Bold (1977), Gallant Special (1982)

Leading trainer (5 wins):

- Mathew Dawson – Jannette (1877), Wheel of Fortune (1878), Bal Gal (1880), Dutch Oven (1881), Rosy Morn (1884)
- Richard Hannon Sr. – Son Pardo (1992), Prolific (2008), Dick Turpin (2009), Libranno (2010), Harbour Watch (2011)

== Winners since 1900 ==
Year	Winner	Jockey	Trainer	Time
1900	Handicapper	Lester Reiff	Fred Day
1901	Duke of Westminster	Danny Maher	Charles Morton
1902	Mead	Herbert Jones	Richard Marsh
1903	Queen's Holiday
1904	Polymelus	Mornington Cannon	John Porter
1905	Lally	Bernard Dillon	Fallon
1906	Weathercock	Bernard Dillon	Peter Gilpin
1907	Bolted	Danny Maher	Reg Day
1908	Bayardo	Danny Maher	Alec Taylor Jr.	1:14.60
1909	Charles O'Malley	William Saxby	Lewis
1910	Pietri	Danny Maher	John Watson
1911	Sweeper II	George Stern	Atty Persse
1912	Seremond	Charlie Trigg	Joseph Butters
1913	Black Jester	Frank Wootton	Charles Morton
1914	Pommern	Walter Griggs	Charles Peck
	no race 1915–18
1919	Golden Guinea	Skeets Martin	Peter Gilpin
1920	Sunblaze	Bernard Carslake	Atty Persse
1921	Fodder	Bernard Carslake	Etienne De Mestre
1922	Bombay Duck	George Hulme	Richard Dawson
1923	Halcyon	Tommy Weston	George Lambton	1:14.20
1924	Manna	Bernard Carslake	Fred Darling	1:14.40
1925	Pantera	Harry Wragg	Walter Earl
1926	The Satrap	Harry Beasley jr.	Atty Persse	1:16.20
1927	Gang Warily	Joe Childs	Fred Darling	1:15.00
1928	Rattlin the Reefer (Note: The 1928 winner Rattlin the Reefer was unnamed as a 2-y-o and ran as Reef colt.)	Bernard Carslake	Reg Day	1:15.20
1929	Challenger	Freddie Fox	Fred Darling	1:15.40
1930	Four Course	Freddie Fox	Fred Darling	1:15.80
1931	Spenser	Bobby Jones	Joseph Lawson	1:18.80
1932	Solar Boy	Freddie Fox	Fred Templeman	1:20.80
1933	Colombo	Steve Donoghue	Tommy Hogg	1:14.20
1934	Bobsleigh	Tommy Weston	Colledge Leader	1:14.80
1935	Mahmoud	Freddie Fox	Frank Butters	1:13.60
1936	Perifox	Rufus Beasley	Cecil Boyd-Rochfort	1:15.60
1937	Unbreakable	Rufus Beasley	Cecil Boyd-Rochfort	1:14.40
1938	Chancery	Bernard Carslake	Harvey Leader	1:14.60
1939	Moradabad	Charlie Smirke	Frank Butters	1:16.80
	no race 1940–45
1946	Petition	Harry Wragg	Frank Butters	1:16.40
1947	Birthday Greetings	Jim Simpson	Henri Jelliss	1:15.00
1948	Star King (Note: The 1948 winner Star King was later exported to Australia and renamed Star Kingdom.)	Sam Wragg	John Waugh	1:13.80
1949	Palestine	Gordon Richards	Frank Butters	1:15.00
1950	Grey Sovereign	Harry Carr	George Beeby	1:14.60
1951	Gay Time	Scobie Breasley	Noel Cannon	1:15.20
1952	Artane	Gordon Richards	Paddy Prendergast	1:15.00
1953	The Pie King	Gordon Richards	Paddy Prendergast	1:14.20
1954	Eubulides	Edgar Britt	Charles Elsey	1:17.60
1955	Ratification	Bill Rickaby	Vic Smyth	1:13.20
1956	Red God	Harry Carr	Cecil Boyd-Rochfort	1:17.40
1957	Promulgation	Eph Smith	Ted Leader	1:12.80
1958	Hieroglyph	Harry Carr	Cecil Boyd-Rochfort	1:15.40
1959	Dollar Piece	Joe Mercer	Humphrey Cottrill	1:14.20
1960	Typhoon	Ron Hutchinson	Paddy Prendergast	1:15.40
1961	Sovereign Lord	Geoff Lewis	Gordon Smyth	1:14.40
1962	Romantic	Lester Piggott	Noel Murless	1:13.60
1963	Gentle Art	Ron Hutchinson	Jack Jarvis	1:12.60
1964	Ragtime	Ron Hutchinson	Gordon Smyth	1:14.00
1965	Sky Gipsy	Ron Hutchinson	Gordon Smyth	1:16.60
1966	Hambleden	Scobie Breasley	Atty Corbett	1:14.20
1967	Berber	Scobie Breasley	Sir Gordon Richards	1:13.60
1968	Tudor Music	Frankie Durr	Michael Jarvis	1:11.60
1969	Village Boy	Bill Williamson	George Todd	1:14.00
1970	Swing Easy	Lester Piggott	Jeremy Tree	1:13.20
1971	Sallust	Joe Mercer	Dick Hern	1:15.44
1972	Master Sing	Joe Mercer	Derrick Candy	1:12.92
1973	Dragonara Palace	Lester Piggott	Barry Hills	1:13.06
1974	Legal Eagle	Geoff Baxter	Bill Marshall	1:14.63
1975	Stand to Reason	Willie Carson	Barry Hills	1:13.21
1976	J. O. Tobin	Lester Piggott	Noel Murless	1:12.54
1977	Persian Bold	Lester Piggott	Tony Ingham	1:13.89
1978	Young Generation	Greville Starkey	Guy Harwood	1:13.62
1979	Castle Green	Paul Cook	Michael Stoute	1:14.59
1980	Another Realm	Joe Mercer	Frankie Durr	1:13.61
1981	Tender King	Philip Waldron	John Sutcliffe, Jr.	1:13.10
1982	Gallant Special	Lester Piggott	Robert Armstrong	1:11.61
1983	Godstone (Note: Vacarme and Creag-an-Sgor were first and second in 1983, but the race was awarded to the third-placed horse)	Graham Sexton	Patrick Haslam	1:11.05
1984	Primo Dominie	John Reid	Brian Swift	1:12.66
1985	Nomination	Richard Quinn	Paul Cole	1:13.69
1986	Rich Charlie	John Reid	Charlie Nelson	1:11.65
1987	Warning	Pat Eddery	Guy Harwood	1:12.96
1988	Heart of Arabia	Ray Cochrane	Clive Brittain	1:13.45
1989	Contract Law	Bruce Raymond	William Jarvis	1:12.23
1990	Mac's Imp	Alan Munro	Bill O'Gorman	1:10.25
1991	Dilum	Alan Munro	Paul Cole	1:13.05
1992	Son Pardo	John Reid	Richard Hannon Sr.	1:11.26
1993	First Trump	Michael Hills	Geoff Wragg	1:12.69
1994	Sri Pekan	Richard Quinn	Paul Cole	1:11.51
1995	Polaris Flight	John Reid	Peter Chapple-Hyam	1:11.27
1996	Easycall	Brett Doyle	Brian Meehan	1:12.13
1997	Daggers Drawn	Kieren Fallon	Henry Cecil	1:12.62
1998	Muqtarib	Richard Hills	John Dunlop	1:14.46
1999	Bachir	Frankie Dettori	John Gosden	1:09.81
2000	Pyrus (Note: Endless Summer finished first in 2000, but he was subsequently disqualified for being an ineligible runner)	Michael Kinane	Aidan O'Brien	1:12.99
2001	Mister Cosmi	Kevin Darley	Mark Johnston	1:11.55
2002	Revenue (Note: Elusive City was first in 2002, but he was later disqualified after testing positive for a banned substance)	Darryll Holland	Michael Bell	1:10.80
2003	Carrizo Creek	Kieren Fallon	Brian Meehan	1:12.25
2004	Montgomery's Arch	Jimmy Fortune	Peter Chapple-Hyam	1:12.81
2005	Always Hopeful	Graham Gibbons	Eoghan O'Neill	1:13.05
2006	Hamoody	Alan Munro	Peter Chapple-Hyam	1:10.68
2007	Strike the Deal	Eddie Ahern	Jeremy Noseda	1:11.59
2008	Prolific (Note: The 2008 winner Prolific was later exported to Hong Kong and renamed Able Speed)	Richard Hughes	Richard Hannon Sr.	1:11.13
2009	Dick Turpin	Richard Hughes	Richard Hannon Sr.	1:11.31
2010	Libranno	Richard Hughes	Richard Hannon Sr.	1:11.48
2011	Harbour Watch	Richard Hughes	Richard Hannon Sr.	1:10.23
2012	Heavy Metal	Joe Fanning	Mark Johnston	1:11.41
2013	Saayerr	Ryan Moore	William Haggas	1:10.14
2014	Ivawood	Richard Hughes	Richard Hannon Jr.	1:10.09
2015	Shalaa	Frankie Dettori	John Gosden	1:10.82
2016	Mehmas	Frankie Dettori	Richard Hannon Jr.	1:11.00
2017	Barraquero	William Buick	Brian Meehan	1:15.42
2018	Land Force (Note: The 2018 winner Land Force was later exported to Hong Kong and renamed King of Yulong)	Ryan Moore	Aidan O'Brien	1:11.50
2019	Golden Horde	Adam Kirby	Clive Cox	1:11.01
2020	Supremacy	Adam Kirby	Clive Cox	1:10.13
2021	Asymmetric	Martin Harley	Alan King	1:14.31
2022	Royal Scotsman	Jim Crowley	Paul and Oliver Cole	1:09.66
2023	Vandeek	Andrea Atzeni	Simon & Ed Crisford	1:13.45
2024	Black Forza	Dylan Browne McMonagle	Michael O'Callaghan	1:09.97
2025	Coppull	David Probert	Clive Cox	1:11.12
2026	Man's Best Friend	Ryan Moore	Aidan O'Brien	1:10.81

== Earlier winners ==
- 1877: Jannette
- 1878: Wheel of Fortune
- 1879: Bend Or
- 1880: Bal Gal
- 1881: Dutch Oven
- 1882: Sigmophone
- 1883: Duke of Richmond
- 1884: Rosy Morn
- 1885: Sunrise
- 1886: Panzerschiff
- 1887: Friar's Balsam
- 1888: Gulliver
- 1889: Golden Gate
- 1890: Siphonia
- 1891: Orme
- 1892: Inverdon
- 1893: Galloping Dick
- 1894: The Nipper
- 1895: Persimmon
- 1896: Chillingham
- 1897: Paladore
- 1898: St Gris
- 1899: Winifreda

== See also ==
- Horse racing in Great Britain
- List of British flat horse races
