= Dutch Oven (horse) =

British-bred Thoroughbred racehorse

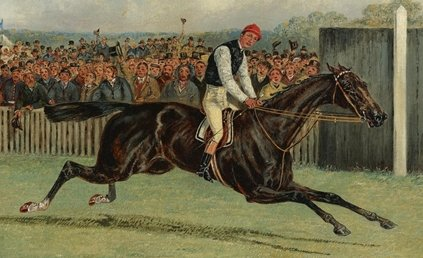
- Lord Falmouth's Dutch Oven Winning the Doncaster St. Leger in 1882, ridden by Fred Archer, c. 1882 by Henry Alken
- Sire: Dutch Skater
- Grandsire: The Flying Dutchman
- Dam: Cantiniere
- Damsire: Stockwell
- Sex: Mare
- Foaled: 1879
- Country: United Kingdom of Great Britain and Ireland
- Colour: Bay
- Breeder: Evelyn Boscawen, 6th Viscount Falmouth
- Owner: 1) 6th Viscount Falmouth; 2) Lord Fitzwilliam
- Trainer: Mathew Dawson
- Record: 29:16-3-7
- Earnings: £18,391

Major wins
- Richmond Stakes (1881); Dewhurst Plate (1881); Yorkshire Oaks (1882); St. Leger Stakes (1882)

Dutch Oven (1879–1894) was a British Thoroughbred mare that won the 1882 St. Leger Stakes. Raced extensively as a two-year-old, she won nine races and £9429, but her form faltered in her late three and four-year-old seasons. Retired in 1884, Dutch Oven was not considered to be a success in the stud, but her offspring exported to Australia and Argentina did produce successful racehorses.

== Background ==
Dutch Oven was foaled in 1879 at Lord Falmouth's Mereworth Castle Stud in Maidstone, Kent. She was sired by Dutch Skater, a noted long-distance runner that was bred in France and had won the Prix Gladiateur and Doncaster Cup in 1872. Dutch Oven was the fourth foal of her dam, Cantiniere, which was bred by Lord Ailesbury and was herself a successful racehorse as a two-year-old, winning six races in seven starts, including the 1872 Ascot Biennial, Chesterfield Stakes and Lavant Stakes. However, by the time Lord Falmouth bought her after the death of Lord Ailesbury, she had developed into a roarer and was consequently judged to be a poor breeding prospect. In addition to Dutch Oven, Cantiniere produced her half-sister, Bal Gal, for Lord Falmouth, which won the 1880 Champagne Stakes and July Stakes.

Dutch Oven was a brown mare with a white strip and two white heels. She was described as a "delicate" filly which had trouble maintaining weight and was subject to great variability in her racing performance. The name "Dutch Oven" resulted from a play on her parents' names and while credited at the time for being "neatly named", the choice was later assessed by historian Laura Thompson to be "possibly the least meaningful name ever given to a classic winner." Dutch Oven was trained by Mathew Dawson at Newmarket.

== Racing career ==
=== 1881:two-year-old season ===
On 5 July at the Newmarket meeting, Dutch Oven ran a dead heat with the future-1000 Guineas winner St. Marguerite for third place in the July Stakes won by Kermesse. A few days later, she won the 700-sovereign Great Lancashire Yearling Stakes run at Manchester by three-quarters of a length over Mr. C. Perkin's colt Pursebearer. Ridden by Fred Archer in the 1172-guinea Richmond Stakes at Goodwood, Dutch Oven again faced St. Marguerite and Kermesse, ultimately winning by a head over St. Marguerite which dead heated with Kermesse for second place. Continuing her winning streak a few days later at the same meeting, she won the Rous Memorial Stakes by a length, beating Pursebearer while carrying 126 pounds (57 kg). At Alexandra Park in August, she finished second by three-quarters of a length to Lord Rothschild's Nellie in the Prince of Wales' Stakes. Returning to racing on 1 September at Derby, Dutch Oven won the Champion Breeders' Foal Stakes, but was second to Kermesse by half a length in the Champagne Stakes run at Doncaster 13 days later. Recovering her form for the October meeting at Newmarket, Dutch Oven won the Triennial Produce Stakes going off at 100 to 30 odds, and she beat Nellie in the Rous Memorial Stakes and the Clearwell Stakes. In her final outing of the season at the Houghton meeting, she won the 300-sovereign Dewhurst Plate by a head. She won nine races and accrued £9429.

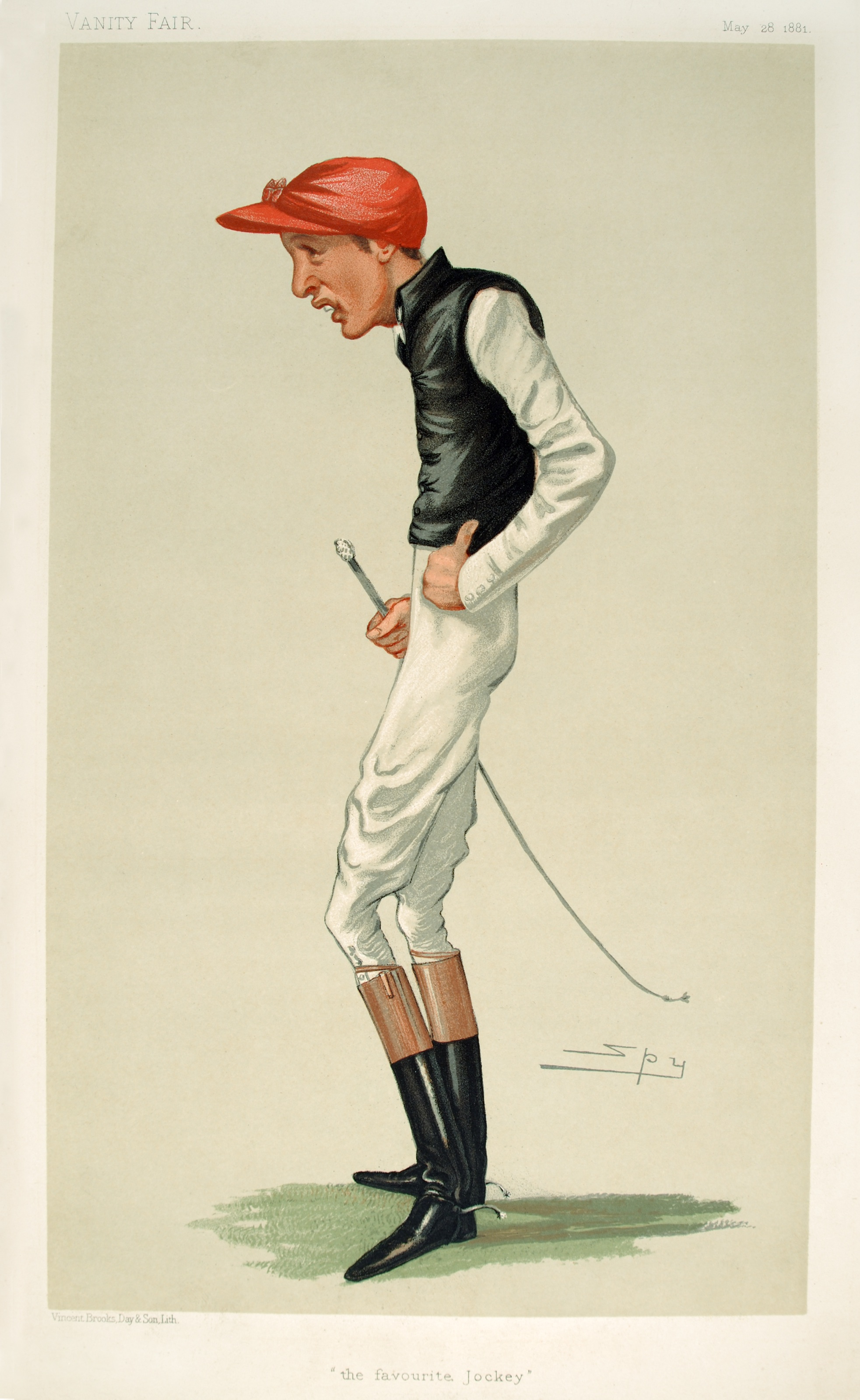
Fred Archer (pictured in Lord Falmouth's colours) was Dutch Oven's primary jockey during her racing career.

=== 1882:three-year-old season ===
1882 was an exceptional year in history of the British Classic races due to fillies winning all of the races in the Triple Crown, a feat usually accomplished by male horses. In her first race of the year, Dutch Oven competed in the 103rd Derby on 24 May in a field of 14 horses. A heavy rainstorm had saturated the track before the start of the race, but the weather had cleared by the time of the running. Going off at 8 to 1 odds, Dutch Oven never contended for the lead and was unplaced in the middle of the field. The race was won by the Duke of Westminster's filly Shotover, which had won the 2,000 Guineas in April by two lengths in "wretchedly untoward" weather.

In July at Goodwood, Dutch Oven was third to Comte Alfred and Battlefield for the Sussex Stakes. Running in field of only three horses, Dutch Oven won the mile and a quarter Yorkshire Oaks by three lengths over Actress and Confusion (who was jockeyed by her owner Mr. J. Osbourne). A few weeks before the St. Leger, Dutch Oven contended for the Great Yorkshire Stakes, losing to Peppermint and Nellie by four lengths.

==== The St. Leger ====
Following the Great Yorkshire, Dutch Oven's form significantly improved and she had made good time over three practice gallops in Newmarket before running in the St. Leger. But in the eyes of the public, Dutch Oven's lacklustre performance in the Great Yorkshire had decreased her stature in the betting pools and she factored at 40 to 1 in the morning line, considered a rank outsider. The 14-horse field, which included Shotover and the Oaks winner Geheimniss, consisted of 10 colts and 4 fillies. At the start, Dutch Oven was on the extreme right of the field and in the next to last position as the filly Actress took the lead. After the Red House, Geheimniss came to the front and maintained the lead as the field moved into the stretch. Dutch Oven came from the outside to beat Geheimniss by one and a half lengths, Shotover following four lengths behind. It was the first and last time in St. Leger history that fillies took the first, second and third positions in the race. Her win was met with "dead silence" from the spectators. Dutch Oven continued her streak with wins in the Great Foal Stakes and the Triennial Produce Stakes at the Newmarket October meeting. She was third to Tristan in the Champion Stakes and to Shrewsbury in the Newmarket Derby. She won £7752 over the season.

=== 1883:four-year-old season ===
Returning as a four-year-old in April at the Craven meeting, Dutch Oven walked over for the Newmarket Biennial Stakes. Over the course of the season, Dutch Oven was repeatedly out classed by Tristan, finishing second by three lengths in the running for the 2.5-mile Ascot Gold Cup and unplaced in the Hardwicke Stakes a few days later. She won the Her Majesty's Plate at Four Oaks Park and was third in the Goodwood Cup to Border Minstrel. At Newmarket in October, she won the Triennial Stakes but was again third to Tristan and Ossian in the Champion Stakes. At Houghton, in what was her final career engagement, Dutch Oven was fourth and last in the Jockey Club Cup won by Ladislas. She won £1210 over the season.

== Breeding career ==
Dutch Oven was sold to Lord Fitzwilliam for £3200 at the dispersal of Lord Falmouth's stud in the spring of 1884. She died in March 1894 after producing the colt Simmer to the cover of St. Simon. At the time of her death, she was considered a failure as a broodmare as her produce were not good racers. Her sons Spring Jack, Gridiron and Simmer did achieve success in the stud in Argentina and Australia.

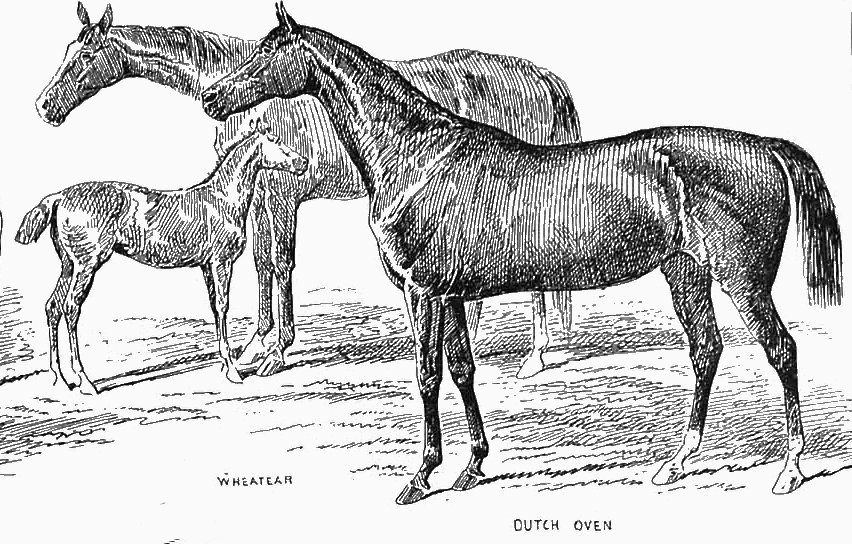
Dutch Oven (right) and Wheatear at Lord Falmouth's Mereworth Stud in 1884, engraving by John Sturgess.

=== Offspring ===
- Spring Jack (1885), brown colt sired by Springfield. Spring Jack won a few races, such as the Houghton New Nursery Stakes, in Britain before he was exported to South America in 1889. He was owned by the Traill family in Argentina and was an important sire in establishing bloodlines of Argentine polo ponies.
- Colt (1886) by Galopin (died at birth).
- Dort (1887), brown colt by Chippendale.
- Gridiron (1888), black colt by Xenophon. Gridiron was exported to Australia in 1897 and achieved some success as a breeding stallion before his death in 1906.
- Biffin (1889), brown mare by Bendigo.
- Ingle-Nook (1892), chestnut filly by King Monmouth.
- Simmer (1894), brown colt by St. Simon. Dutch Oven died shortly after Simmer's birth and he was raised by a foster mare. Simmer was unraced due to a leg injury as a yearling. Derided as a horse that could "neither gallop, trot nor walk", he was exported to Australia in 1898 to the Tocal Stud for use as a breeding stallion. He was sold at the dispersal of the stud in 1901 to George Kiss for £1200. He died in May 1909 at the Hobartville stud in New South Wales. Simmer sired the AJC St. Leger winner Dividend, and he appears in the pedigrees of Australian steeplechase horses, such as Hercules and Kincumber.

== Pedigree ==
Pedigree of Dutch Oven (GB), Brown Mare, 1879
Sire Dutch Skater (FR) Brown, 1866	The Flying Dutchman (GB); 1846	Bay Middleton	Sultan
Sire Dutch Skater (FR) Brown, 1866	The Flying Dutchman (GB); 1846	Bay Middleton	Cobweb
Sire Dutch Skater (FR) Brown, 1866	The Flying Dutchman (GB); 1846	Barbelle	Sandbeck
Sire Dutch Skater (FR) Brown, 1866	The Flying Dutchman (GB); 1846	Barbelle	Darioletta
Sire Dutch Skater (FR) Brown, 1866	Fulvie (FR); 1856	Gladiator (GB)	Partisan
Sire Dutch Skater (FR) Brown, 1866	Fulvie (FR); 1856	Gladiator (GB)	Pauline
Sire Dutch Skater (FR) Brown, 1866	Fulvie (FR); 1856	Boutique (FR)	Young Emilius
Sire Dutch Skater (FR) Brown, 1866	Fulvie (FR); 1856	Boutique (FR)	Belvidere
Dam Cantiniere (GB) Brown, 1870	Stockwell; 1849	The Baron	Birdcatcher
Dam Cantiniere (GB) Brown, 1870	Stockwell; 1849	The Baron	Echidna
Dam Cantiniere (GB) Brown, 1870	Stockwell; 1849	Pocahontas	Glencoe
Dam Cantiniere (GB) Brown, 1870	Stockwell; 1849	Pocahontas	Marpessa
Dam Cantiniere (GB) Brown, 1870	Cantine; 1856	Orlando	Touchstone
Dam Cantiniere (GB) Brown, 1870	Cantine; 1856	Orlando	Vulture
Dam Cantiniere (GB) Brown, 1870	Cantine; 1856	Vivandiere	Voltaire
Dam Cantiniere (GB) Brown, 1870	Cantine; 1856	Vivandiere	Martha Lynn (Family 2)
