= Gamos =

British Thoroughbred racehorse

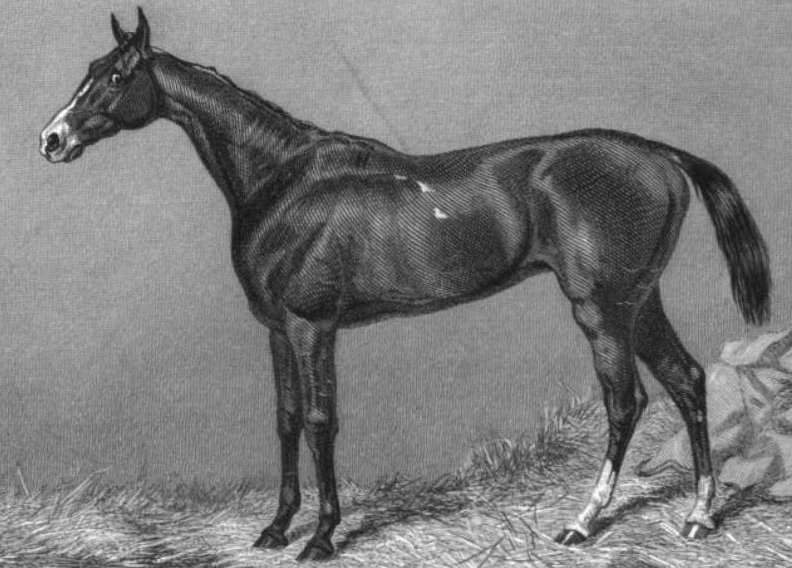
- Engraving of Gamos by Edward Hacker after Harry Hall, 1870.
- Sire: Saunterer
- Grandsire: Birdcatcher
- Dam: Bess Lyon
- Damsire: Longbow
- Sex: Mare
- Foaled: 1867
- Country: United Kingdom
- Colour: Chestnut
- Breeder: Lord Falmouth
- Owner: William Graham
- Trainer: Henry Woolcott

Major wins
- Epsom Oaks (1870)

Gamos (1867–1893) was a British Thoroughbred racehorse that won the 1870 Epsom Oaks. Sold to William Graham as a yearling, Gamos won six out of eight starts as a two-year-old in 1869, but failed to improve her racing form after the 1870 Oaks. Gamos raced until she was four-years-old and retired from racing in 1871. Gamos was not successful as a breeding mare and died in 1893 after being sold for £15 in 1890.

== Background ==
Gamos was bred by Lord Falmouth and was foaled at his Mereworth stud farm in 1867. Her sire, Saunterer, was a black horse bred by R.M. Jacques and foaled in 1854 at Easby Abbey in Yorkshire. He was owned during and after his three-year-old season by James Merry, winning the Chester Handicap and the 1858 Goodwood Cup. Her dam, Bess Lyon, was an unsuccessful racehorse that was bought by Lord Falmouth in 1860. Bess Lyon produced eight foals between 1865 and 1877, including four full-siblings to Gamos: the fillies Loadstar and Marriage (sent to South Africa in 1875) and the colts Libertine and King George.

In the later part of 1867, Bess Lyon and Gamos were sold for £600 to William Blenkiron, who owned the Middle Park Stud in Kent. In 1868, William Graham (1808–1876) purchased Gamos for 220 guineas at Blenkiron's yearling sale. Graham had won the 1865 Oaks with Regalia and had captured the 1868 Oaks, 1,000 Guineas Stakes and St. Leger Stakes with Formosa. William Graham was born in Dufton Wood and was a successful wrestler in the 1820s and 1830s and was a part owner of a gin distillery.

Gamos was a tall, light chestnut filly that stood 16 hands high and was noted by The Farmer's Magazine as having an unattractive "plain looking" head set on a "lean, ungainly neck." Her shoulders were well formed, but her hocks were straight and her joints appeared infirm, attributes that did not "bear the least resemblance to her sire." From Harry Hall's 1870 portrait of the filly, Gamos had a narrow white blaze, a completely white muzzle and socks on her hind legs. Her coarse looks were attributed to Bess Lyon's influence, as she was noted for producing "ugly foals." Graham selected Greek and Latin names for his two-year-old horses in 1869. Gamos is a Greek word that means marriage.

== Racing career ==
Gamos was trained at Beckhampton by Henry Woolcott. William Graham used pseudonyms when entering his horses in races. For Gamos and Formosa, he used the name G. Jones. In her two-year-old season, Gamos won six and was second in two races, accruing £1,654 in stakes winnings.

=== 1869: two-year-old season ===
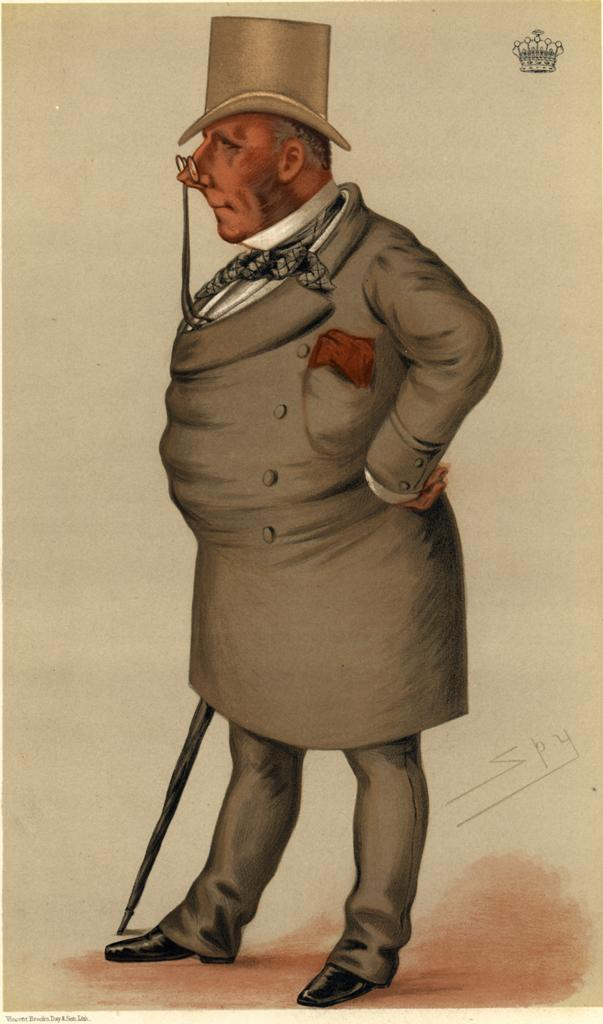
Evelyn Boscawen, 6th Viscount Falmouth, in a caricature by Leslie Ward. Lord Falmouth bred Gamos and the 1870 Derby winner Kingcraft at his estate at Mereworth.

At her first career start on 19 May at Bath ridden by George Fordham, Gamos won the Weston Stakes by a length over the filly Lady of Lyons and ten other horses. At Harpenden a few days later, Gamos won the Two-years-old Stakes by three-quarters of a length from Paté. Gamos's third win occurred at the June Summer Meeting at Windsor where she won the £170 Windsor Stakes against one other horse. On 29 July at Goodwood, Gamos won the Bentinck Memorial Stakes by a neck over Lord Falmouth's filly Gertrude. Gamos won the Lodmor Stakes at Weymouth and the Windsor Stakes for two-year-olds at the Newmarket October Meeting. She finished second in two races: the half-mile Gopsal Park Stakes at Leicester and the Woburn Park Stakes at Bedford.

=== 1870: three-year-old-season ===
Gamos's first start of the season was for the mile and a half Bath Biennial Stakes held in May. Practically every inn in town had been filled to capacity due to Mr. Merry announcing that his erstwhile unbeatable colt Macgregor would run in the £600 Biennial. A recent drought had made the turf extremely hard, its texture later likened to adamantine by the press. For the first mile of the race, Macgregor (ridden by Grimshaw) and Gamos (ridden by Fordham) were evenly matched, but at the turn Macgregor "quitted Gamos in such a way that the later appeared to be standing still." He passed the Lady Sommerset filly and Recorder to win the race by 12 lengths, Gamos finishing third but not officially placed.

At William Blenkiron's annual Middle Park Stud yearling sale before the Oaks running, the luncheon tickets were inscribed "Gamos" in a nod to the filly. The running of the Oaks Stakes was regarded as "dull" with decreased attendance and a card of only seven runners, the "smallest field for the last half-century." The Annual Register characterized the mood as "a general flatness over all and every thing." Gamos did not factor in the betting, her popularity being greatly reduced with the public after her "disgraceful" loss to Mr. Merry's colt Macgregor at Bath. Two days before the Oaks, Macgregor, who had been heavily favoured for The Derby, broke down in the running while ridden by George Fordham. His poor performance was purported to be due to lameness incurred during the Biennial Stakes at Bath. Fordham rode Gamos in the Oaks and held back the filly for most of the race, the frontrunners Hawthorndale and Paté maintaining a lead until the half-mile post. Hester quickly ran past Paté after the half-mile but faded at the Tattenham Corner turn, yielding to Paté. Sunshine, Paté, Gamos and Gertrude ran together at the half-distance, Fordham pulling Gamos into the lead over Sunshine. Gamos hung on to the lead and won the race by a length with Mr. Merry's Sunshine finishing second and Mr. England's Paté third.

Gamos was second in the Bentinck Memorial Stakes at Goodwood, losing by a neck to Lady of Lyons. She was third in the Yorkshire Oaks won by Gertrude and second in the Park Hill Stakes won by Agility. In her final win of the season, Gamos won the Grand Duke Michael at Newmarket by two lengths.

=== 1871: four-year-old season ===
Gamos ran four times as a four-year-old. She was unplaced in the Great Handicap held at Lincoln and in two other races. She won the Princess of Wales's Stakes at the Newmarket Spring Meeting, beating the filly Mahonia.

== Breeding career ==
Gamos was acquired by Lord Portsmouth and Mr. Merry (of the Hurstbourne Stud) after her racing career ended in 1872. She was sold with her foal by Lord Lyon to William Blenkiron in June 1873 for 1,000 guineas. Gamos was sold at the Middle Park Stud dispersal sale in 1878 and was bought by Mr. R. Peek for 1000 guineas. In 1890, the 23-year-old Gamos was sold for 15 guineas. Gamos died in 1893.

Gamos is considered to be a failure as a broodmare and was referred to as "the mare of many headaches" by Baily's Magazine in 1875. Her most notable descendants trace to her 1876 filly, Blushing Bride, sired by Rosicrucian and her 1883 filly Rosy Brook sired by Muncaster. Through Blushing Bride, Gamos is the tail-female ancestor of 1922 Chilean St. Leger winner Isabelino, South African Derby winner Carlisle and Irish Derby winner Furore. Rosy Brook's descendants include the AJC St Leger winner Lady Valais.

=== Full progeny list ===
- Cupid, chestnut gelding (1873) sired by Lord Lyon.
- Bridegroom, chestnut gelding (1874) by Lord Lyon.
- Chardian, brown colt (1875) by Rosicrucian.
- Blushing Bride, bay filly (1876) by Rosicrucian.
- Titus Caesar, chestnut colt (1877) by Vespasian.
- Bay filly (1878) by Dutch Skater
- Bay colt (1879) by Scottish Chief (died young).
- Russley, chestnut gelding (1881) by Doncaster.
- Lakelet, chestnut filly (1882) by Muncaster. Lakelet won one race out of eight starts. She produced one foal before dying in 1891.
- Rosy Brook, chestnut filly (1883) by Muncaster
- Byron, brown colt (1884) by Beauclerc
- Tomasha, bay filly (1885) by Hilarious
- Stillborn colt (1888) by Hawkstone
- Albert Gate, bay colt (1891) by Umpire

== Pedigree ==
Pedigree of Gamos (GB), Chestnut Mare, 1867
| Sire Saunterer (GB) Black, 1854 | Birdcatcher; 1833 | Sir Hercules | Whalebone |
| Sire Saunterer (GB) Black, 1854 | Birdcatcher; 1833 | Sir Hercules | Peri |
| Sire Saunterer (GB) Black, 1854 | Birdcatcher; 1833 | Guiccioli | Bob Booty |
| Sire Saunterer (GB) Black, 1854 | Birdcatcher; 1833 | Guiccioli | Flight |
| Sire Saunterer (GB) Black, 1854 | Ennui; 1843 | Bay Middleton* | Sultan* |
| Sire Saunterer (GB) Black, 1854 | Ennui; 1843 | Bay Middleton* | Cobweb* |
| Sire Saunterer (GB) Black, 1854 | Ennui; 1843 | Blue Devils | Velocipede* |
| Sire Saunterer (GB) Black, 1854 | Ennui; 1843 | Blue Devils | Care |
| Dam Bess Lyon (GB) Chestnut, 1855 | Longbow; 1849 | Ithuriel | Touchstone |
| Dam Bess Lyon (GB) Chestnut, 1855 | Longbow; 1849 | Ithuriel | Verbena* |
| Dam Bess Lyon (GB) Chestnut, 1855 | Longbow; 1849 | Miss Bowe | Catton |
| Dam Bess Lyon (GB) Chestnut, 1855 | Longbow; 1849 | Miss Bowe | Orville Mare |
| Dam Bess Lyon (GB) Chestnut, 1855 | Daughter of Toscar; 1845 | Bay Middleton* | Sultan* |
| Dam Bess Lyon (GB) Chestnut, 1855 | Daughter of Toscar; 1845 | Bay Middleton* | Cobweb* |
| Dam Bess Lyon (GB) Chestnut, 1855 | Daughter of Toscar; 1845 | Malvina | Oscar |
| Dam Bess Lyon (GB) Chestnut, 1855 | Daughter of Toscar; 1845 | Malvina | Spotless (Family 4-p) |

* Gamos is inbred 3S x 3D to the stallion Bay Middleton, meaning that he appears third generation on the sire side of her pedigree, and third generation on the dam side of her pedigree.

* Gamos is inbred 4S x 5D to the stallion Velocipede, meaning that he appears fourth generation on the sire side of her pedigree, and fifth generation (via Verbena) on the dam side of her pedigree.
