= Wheel of Fortune (horse) =

British Thoroughbred racehorse

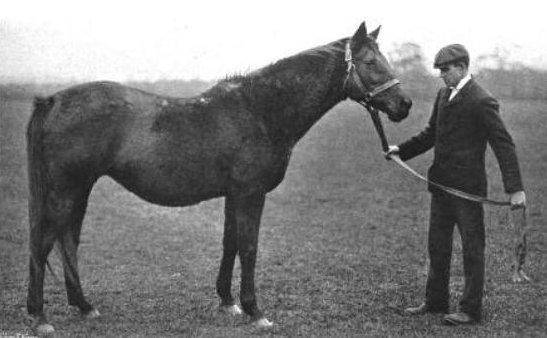
- Wheel of Fortune, circa 1903, in a photograph by W.A. Rouch.
- Sire: Adventurer
- Grandsire: Newminster
- Dam: Queen Bertha
- Damsire: Kingston
- Sex: Mare
- Foaled: 1876
- Country: United Kingdom
- Colour: Bay
- Breeder: Evelyn Boscawen, 6th Viscount Falmouth
- Owner: Lord Falmouth
- Trainer: Mathew Dawson
- Record: 11:10-1-0
- Earnings: £19,740

Major wins
- Richmond Stakes (1878); Dewhurst Stakes (1878); 1000 Guineas (1879); Epsom Oaks (1879); Prince of Wales's Stakes (Ascot) (1879); Yorkshire Oaks (1879)

Wheel of Fortune (1876 – November 1903) was a British Thoroughbred racehorse and broodmare. In a career that lasted from July 1878 to August 1879 she ran eleven times and won ten races. She was the best British two-year-old of either sex in 1878, when she went unbeaten in six races. The following year she won the 1000 Guineas, The Oaks, the Prince of Wales's Stakes and the Yorkshire Oaks before being injured when suffering her only defeat. She was retired from racing at the end of 1879 and became a modestly successful broodmare. Wheel of Fortune was regarded by contemporary experts as one of the best racemares of the 19th century.

== Background ==
Wheel of Fortune was a small but "beautiful" bay filly standing just over 15 hands high, bred at Mereworth by her owner Evelyn Boscawen, 6th Viscount Falmouth. Her sire, Adventurer won the Gold Vase at Royal Ascot and two runnings of the City and Suburban Handicap at Epsom. At stud, his other winners included the Fillies' Triple Crown winner Apology. Wheel of Fortune's dam, Queen Bertha, won the Oaks in 1863 and went on to become a successful and influential broodmare. Apart from Wheel of Fortune she also produced the 1000 Guineas winner Spinaway (the dam of Busybody) and was the direct female ancestor of many good horses including The Derby winners My Babu and Larkspur and the Belmont Stakes winner Celtic Ash.

Falmouth sent the filly to be trained at Heath House stable by Mathew Dawson. She was ridden in most of her races by Fred Archer the thirteen times Champion Jockey. At Dawson's stables, Wheel of Fortune was noted for her enormous appetite and particular fondness for oranges, nuts and meat-pies.

== Racing career ==
=== 1878: two-year-old season ===
Wheel of Fortune made her first appearance in July when she was sent to Goodwood for the Richmond Stakes over six furlongs. In this race she competed against colts as she was to do in all her starts in 1878. Ridden by Archer she led from the start and soon had her eleven opponents struggling as she won "very easily" from Peter Flat and the Woodcote Stakes winner Cadogan. The beaten horses included Peter, who went on to win the Middle Park Stakes. In August she won the Prince of Wales's Stakes at York by half a length from Falmouth 'leading to her being described as "the premier two-year-old of the day". In September she added another prize without having to race as she walked over to win the Wentworth Produce Stakes at Doncaster.

At Newmarket in autumn she won the Buckenham Stakes on 1 October and the Triennial Produce Stakes later at the same meeting. On her final start of the year at the Newmarket Houghton meeting she carried a seven pound weight penalty in the Dewhurst Stakes. She was settled behind the leaders before moving to the front a furlong from the finish and winning "in magnificent style" by a length from the colt Flavius. She finished the season undefeated in six races, having won more than £7,665 in prize money. She was regarded by press commentators as by far the best juvenile of either sex to have run in Britain that year.

=== 1879: three-year-old season ===
Wheel of Fortune made good physical progress over the winter and her performance in training was impressive: according to one rumour she had defeated the 1877 Epsom Derby winner Silvio and the 1878 Oaks and St Leger winner Jannette in a private trial, and she was reported to be at least ten pounds superior to her stable companion Charibert, who won the 2000 Guineas. On 2 May, two days after Charibert's classic win at Newmarket, Wheel of Fortune began her three-year-old career in the 1000 Guineas at the same course. She started at odds of 8/13 against seven other fillies. Archer restrained the filly at the back of the field in the early stages before allowing her to move forward at half way. She moved through the field to take the lead a furlong from the finish and pulled clear to win very easily by four lengths from Abbaye with Reconciliation a further six lengths back in third.

On 30 May at Epsom, Wheel of Fortune started at odds of 1/3 for the Oaks in a field of eight runners. Archer settled the favourite in third or fourth place on the inside as the Yorkshire-trained Coromandel made the running until the turn into the straight. Two furlongs from the finish Wheel of Fortune moved up alongside the leader and then went quickly clear to come home "the easiest of winners" by three lengths from Coromandel with Adventure finishing a distant third. Wheel of Fortune reappeared at Royal Ascot on 13 June in the Prince of Wales's Stakes in which she conceded weight to a field of top class colts and fillies. She was held up by Archer until the straight, and then showed impressive acceleration to settle the race in a few strides and won easily by one and a half lengths from Adventure with Rayon d'Or in third. Wheel of Fortune was then aimed at the St Leger and was made 6/4 favourite for the Doncaster race.

In August Wheel of Fortune was sent to York where she won the Yorkshire Oaks and, despite signs of swelling in her left foreleg, she ran again two days later in the Great Yorkshire Stakes. In this race she tracked the colt Ruperra and the two pulled clear of the other runners in the closing stages, but when Archer attempted to send the filly past her rival she began to struggle and was beaten by a length. Wheel of Fortune returned from the race lame and after showing signs of improvement she pulled up lame again after exercise the following week. On 6 September she was scratched (withdrawn) from the St Leger which was won in her absence by Rayon d'Or.

== Assessment ==
In May 1886 The Sporting Times carried out a poll of one hundred racing experts to create a ranking of the best British racehorses of the 19th century. Wheel of Fortune was ranked in the top ten by eleven of the contributors, placing her twenty-sixth among all horses and making her the fifth highest-rated filly or mare behind Virago, Plaisanterie, Crucifix and Blink Bonny. Fred Archer was reported to have considered her the best filly or mare he ever rode.

== Stud career ==
Wheel of Fortune was retired to stud by her owner at the end of 1879. In early 1884 Lord Falmouth abandoned his interest in racing and sold off all his horses. Wheel of Fortune was bought for 5500 guineas by the Duke of Portland and was moved to the Duke's stud at Welbeck Abbey where she was still living in 1900. As a broodmare her record was initially disappointing, although she did produce Oberon, the winner of the Lincolnshire Handicap in 1887. Through her daughter Donna Fortuna, however, she became the direct ancestor of many good German Thoroughbreds including the Deutsches Derby winners Zauberer and Navarino. Wheel of Fortune died in November 1903.

== Pedigree ==
Pedigree of Wheel of Fortune (GB), bay mare, 1876
Sire Adventurer(GB) 1859	Newminster; 1848	Touchstone	Camel
Sire Adventurer(GB) 1859	Newminster; 1848	Touchstone	Banter
Sire Adventurer(GB) 1859	Newminster; 1848	Beeswing	Doctor Syntax
Sire Adventurer(GB) 1859	Newminster; 1848	Beeswing	Ardrossan mare
Sire Adventurer(GB) 1859	Palma; 1840	Emilius	Orville
Sire Adventurer(GB) 1859	Palma; 1840	Emilius	Emily
Sire Adventurer(GB) 1859	Palma; 1840	Francesca	Partisan
Sire Adventurer(GB) 1859	Palma; 1840	Francesca	Orville mare
Dam Queen Bertha (GB) 1860	Kingston; 1849	Venison	Partisan
Dam Queen Bertha (GB) 1860	Kingston; 1849	Venison	Fawn
Dam Queen Bertha (GB) 1860	Kingston; 1849	Queen Anne	Slane
Dam Queen Bertha (GB) 1860	Kingston; 1849	Queen Anne	Garcia
Dam Queen Bertha (GB) 1860	Flax; 1855	Surplice	Touchstone
Dam Queen Bertha (GB) 1860	Flax; 1855	Surplice	Crucifix
Dam Queen Bertha (GB) 1860	Flax; 1855	Odessa	Sultan
Dam Queen Bertha (GB) 1860	Flax; 1855	Odessa	sister to Cobweb (Family:1-w)
