= Evelyn Boscawen, 7th Viscount Falmouth =

English aristocrat and army officer

Major-General The Right Honourable The Viscount Falmouth KCVO CB
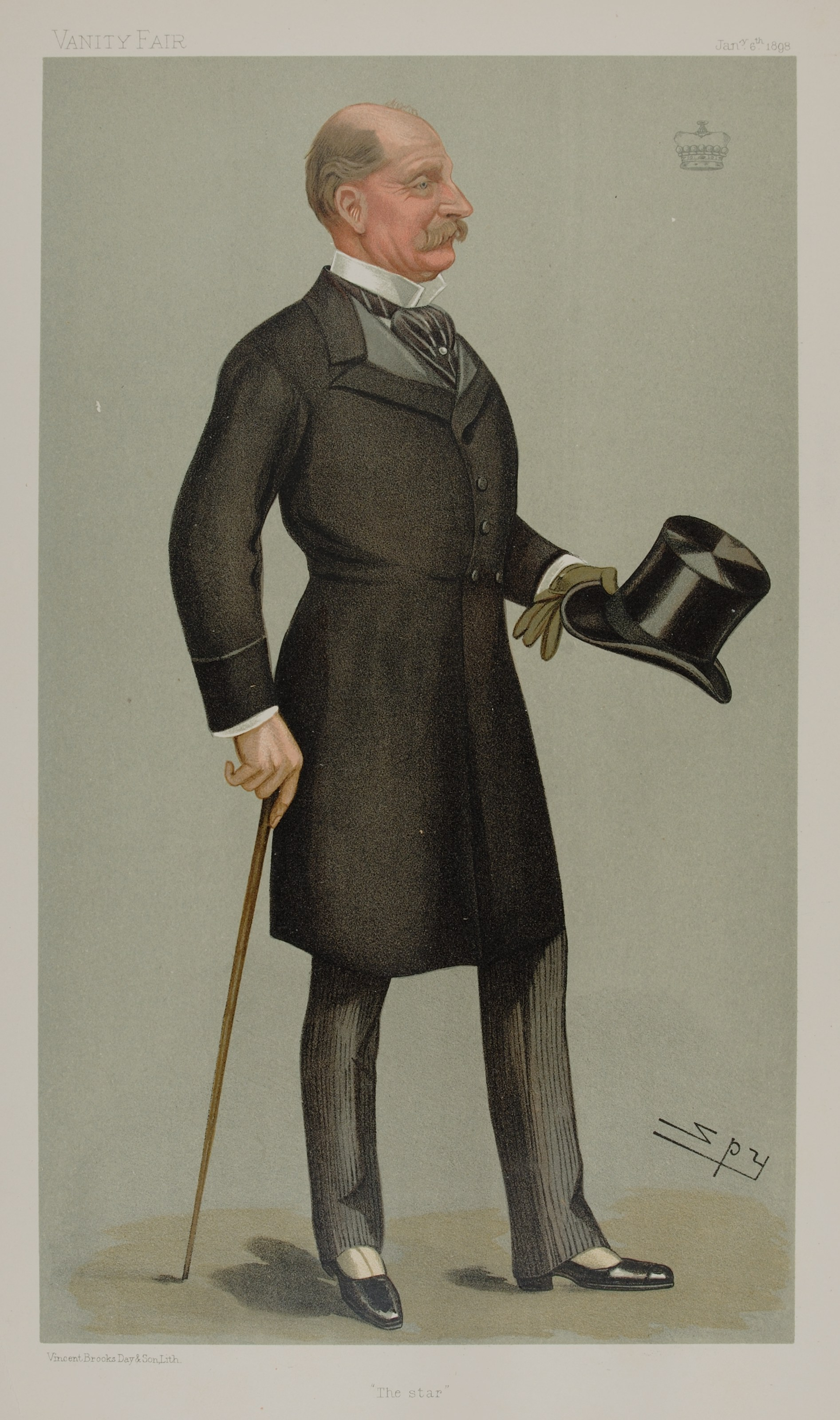
- In Vanity Fair, 6 January 1898
- Born: 24 July 1847
- Died: 1 October 1918 (aged 71)
- Spouse: Hon. Kathleen Douglas-Pennant (m. 1886)
- Children: 5 including Evelyn Hugh John Boscawen, 8th Viscount Falmouth
- Military career
- Allegiance: United Kingdom
- Branch: British Army
- Rank: Major-General
- Conflicts: Anglo-Egyptian War; Nile Expedition
- Awards: Knight Commander of the Royal Victorian Order; Companion of the Order of the Bath

Major-General Evelyn Edward Thomas Boscawen, 7th Viscount Falmouth, KCVO, CB (24 July 1847 – 1 October 1918) was a British peer and British Army officer.

== Early life ==
Lord Falmouth was born on 24 July 1847, the eldest son of Evelyn Boscawen, 6th Viscount Falmouth, and the 13th Baroness le Despenser.

== Military career ==
Boscawen was commissioned into the Coldstream Guards: he played cricket for the Household Brigade and then for the 1st Battalion Coldstream Guards. He fought in the Anglo-Egyptian War in 1882 and, having been promoted to colonel in 1886, he also took part in the Nile Expedition between 1884 and 1885. He was promoted to major-general in 1898 and became Assistant Military Secretary to the Commander-in-Chief, Ireland in 1900. He was appointed a deputy lieutenant of Kent on 8 January 1900, and of Cornwall on 19 March. He retired from the army on 9 August 1902.

Boscawen succeeded to the title of 7th Viscount Falmouth on 6 November 1889.

== Family ==
He married the Hon. Kathleen Douglas-Pennant, eldest daughter of Lord Penrhyn, on 19 October 1886 at St Paul's Church, Knightsbridge Their daughter, Kathleen Pamela Mary Corona (1902–1995), the actress known by the stage name Pamela Carme, married theatrical manager Henry Sherek.

According to Lady Randolph Churchill's sisters, he might have had a liaison with her, and might have been the biological father of John Strange Spencer-Churchill, the younger brother of Winston Churchill.

== Sources ==
- Mosley, Charles, editor. Burke's Peerage, Baronetage & Knightage, 107th edition, 3 volumes. Wilmington, Delaware, U.S.A.: Burke's Peerage (Genealogical Books) Ltd, 2003

Honorary titles
Preceded by Lord William Seymour	Colonel of the Coldstream Guards; 1915–1918	Succeeded by Sir Alfred Codrington
Peerage of Great Britain
Preceded by Evelyn Boscawen	Viscount Falmouth; 1889–1918	Succeeded by Evelyn Boscawen
Preceded by Mary Boscawen	Baron le Despencer; 1891–1918	Succeeded by Evelyn Boscawen
