= Kingcraft =

British-bred Thoroughbred racehorse

- Kingcraft. Painting by Harry Hall, 1877
- Sire: King Tom
- Grandsire: Harkaway
- Dam: Woodcraft
- Damsire: Voltigeur
- Sex: Stallion
- Foaled: 1867
- Country: United Kingdom
- Colour: Bay
- Breeder: Evelyn Boscawen, 6th Viscount Falmouth
- Owner: Lord Falmouth
- Trainer: Mathew Dawson
- Record: 26: 9-4-4 (incomplete)

Major wins
- Derby Stakes (1870)

Kingcraft (1867–1887) was a British Thoroughbred racehorse and sire. He was one of the leading British two-year-old of his generation, winning six of his nine races in 1869. The following year he finished third in the 2000 Guineas and then recorded his most important victory when winning The Derby. Later in the year he finished second in the St Leger. Kingcraft remained in training for two more seasons but had little further success and was retired to stud. He was later sold for export to the United States but died in transit to his new base in Kentucky.

== Background ==
Kingcraft, a handsome but "delicate-looking" bay horse standing 16 hands high, was bred by his owner Evelyn Boscawen, 6th Viscount Falmouth at his stud at Mereworth Castle in Kent. He was sired by King Tom a successful racehorse who became an important sire, being the Leading sire in Great Britain and Ireland in 1870 and 1871. Lord Falmouth sent the colt into training with Mathew Dawson at his private stable at Heath House at Newmarket, Suffolk.

== Racing career ==
=== 1869: two-year-old season ===
Kingcraft began his career in a Triennial Stakes at Ascot in which he was beaten a head by a filly. He then won his next six races including the Chesterfield Stakes at Newmarket, the Ham Stakes at Goodwood and the Convivial Stakes at York.

In autumn he ran at Newmarket, winning the Buckenham Stakes and a Triennial Stakes and then walking over in the October Produce Stakes when no other horses opposed him, before contesting one of the year's most prestigious two-year-old races, the Middle Park Plate. His previous successes meant that he had to carry a seven pound weight penalty, as did the season's leading filly Sunshine. In a rough finish, Sunshine was beaten a head by another filly, Frivolity, with Kingcraft a further head behind in third. On his final start in the Criterion Stakes he was beaten by yet another filly named Hester, who went on to win the following year's 1000 Guineas. Although the defeat was disappointing, it was pointed out that Kingcraft was not an "every day" horse and may not have recovered from his run in the Middle Park. Kingcraft's performances as a two-year-old earned his owner £3,765.

Kingcraft went into the winter break regarded as the leading colt of his generation, being second favourite for the 1870 Derby behind Sunshine.

=== 1870: three-year-old season ===
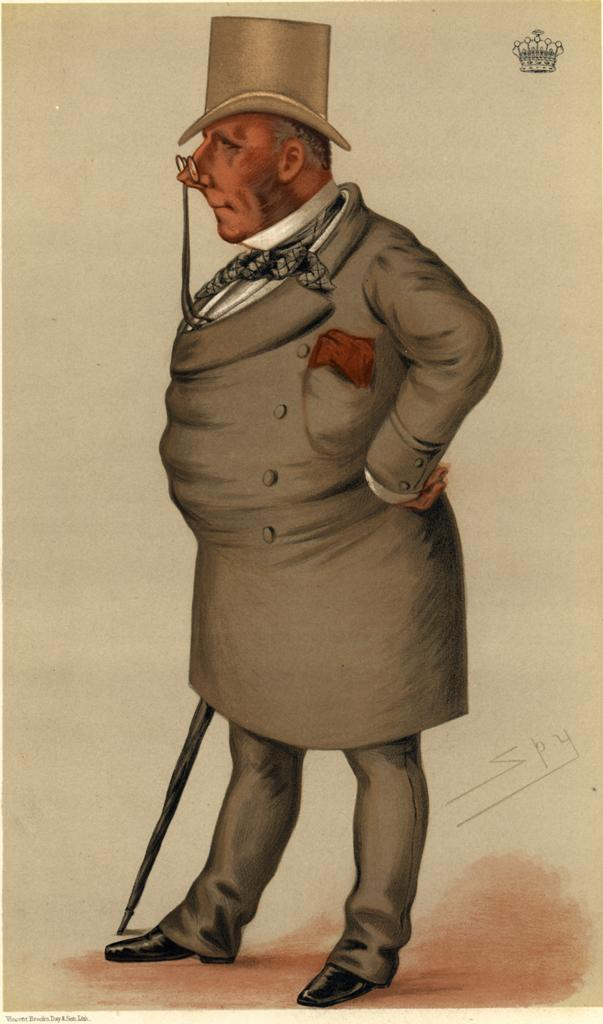
Lord Falmouth, Kingcraft's owner

Kingcraft remained a leading fancy for the Classics in the spring of 1870, but a great deal of interest and money was invested in an unraced colt called Macgregor. One analysis of the candidates for the 2000 Guineas offered the view that while Kingcraft possessed brilliant speed, his courage or "pluck" was questionable. On his three-year-old debut, Kingcraft started 2/1 favourite for the 2000 Guineas at Newmarket in a field of ten runners. He produced a "miserable" effort, never reaching the lead and finishing third, seven lengths behind Macgregor who won very impressively.

Macgregor was the subject of a huge public gamble for the Derby on June 1, and was made one of the shortest-priced favourites in the history of the race at odds of 4/9. Kingcraft on the other hand was almost forgotten and started a 20/1 outsider in a field of fifteen. According to a report in The Spectator the weather on Derby day was poor and the crowd smaller than usual. Ridden by Tom French, Kingcraft was saddled away from the main paddock and disappointed the crowd by failing to take part in the parade in front of the stands. The start of the race was delayed for some time by the behaviour of Cockney Boy who refused to line up with the other runners. When the race got under way French restrained Kingcraft at the back of the field in the early stages before making steady progress from half way. Approaching the turn into the straight, French pulled Kingcraft to the wide outside, avoiding the congestion and bumping along the rail. The outsiders Palmerston and Muster led the race in the straight from Macgregor, but two furlongs from the finish the favourite came under pressure and was soon beaten. French made his move on Kingcraft just over a furlong from the finish, took the lead from Palmerston and quickly pulled clear to win by four lengths. The win delighted the bookmakers who had heavy liabilities on Macgregor. Lord Falmouth had accepted a bet of sixpence on Kingcraft from the wife of his trainer Mathew Dawson. After Kingcraft won, he presented Mrs Dawson with a sixpence set in a £500 silver bracelet. Kingcraft was allowed to walk over in the Great Surrey Foal Stakes at the same meeting.

The difficulties of early telegraphic communication were illustrated by the reporting of the race by the "American Press Association". Receiving two slightly different reports of the race within a short space of time, the APA reporter assumed that two different events were being described and reported that the race had been run in two heats, with Kingcraft winning both.

On 24 September, Kingcraft started 2/1 favourite for the St Leger at Doncaster ahead of Palmerston and Sunlight. Tom French held Kingcraft up in the early stages before producing him on the inside to take the lead in the straight. He looked the likely winner until Hawthornden emerged with a strong challenge on the wide outside. Inside the final furlong Kingcraft was overtaken and beaten half a length in an exciting finish. Later at the same meeting he ran in the Doncaster Stakes over one and a half miles in which he started favourite at 7/4 but finished fourth of the five runners behind Enterprise. In October, Kingcraft ran four times at Newmarket, but his only success came when he walked over in the Select Stakes. He finished second in a Triennial Stakes, fourth in the Newmarket St Leger and fourth in the All-Aged Stakes. His performances led to speculation that his hard race in the St Leger had "subdued his spirit"

=== Later career ===
Kingcraft had little success in two more seasons, although he ran in many important races. In April 1871 he was beaten by Palmerston in the Claret Stakes at Newmarket. At Ascot in June Kingcraft ran in the Gold Cup in which he finished fifth of the seven runners behind the French-trained Mortemer. He was also beaten in a Triennial Stakes and the same meeting. At Newmarket in October that autumn he started at odds of 20/1 for the Cesarewitch Handicap and ran unplaced behind Corisande. Later that month at the same racecourse he finished fifth to Sabinus in the Cambridgeshire.

On 23 April 1872 Kingcraft returned to Epsom, the scene of his biggest win, and ran unplaced in the City and Suburban Handicap won by Digby Grand. At Goodwood in July he produced his best performance for almost two years when he stayed on in the straight to take third place behind the favourite Spennithorne in the Goodwood Stakes over two and a half miles. Later that season he ran in the Liverpool Autumn Cup and was made joint favourite. Ridden by Charles Maidment he held the lead in the closing stages but although he ran on with "great gameness" he was beaten a head by the three-year-old Vanderdecken. The winning time of 2:33.5 was one of the fastest ever recorded for a mile and a half.

== Assessment ==
William Allison, in his book "Memories of Men and Horses" described Kingcraft as "the best-looking Derby winner I have seen" but "a bad one according to classic standard." The Pall Mall Budget called Kingcraft "one of the worst horses which have ever won the Derby" and his opposition at Epsom as "rubbish."

== Stud career ==
Kingcraft was retired to his owners stud where he had limited success. The best of his offspring were Swift and Vernet, both of whom won the Grand Critérium. When Lord Falmouth decided to dispose of all his horses in 1884 Kingcraft was bought for 500 guineas by Lord Rossmore. Four months later on 8 December Lord Rossmore sold Kingcraft for 530 guineas. He was sent to Ireland where he stood at the Athgarvan Stud at the Curragh. The best of his Irish runners was Springfield Maid a notable steeplechaser who won the Irish Grand National and the Galway Plate. He was later sold to Daniel Swigert of Elmendorf Farm at the end of 1886, but died on board ship six days after leaving England.

== Sire line tree ==
- Kingcraft
  - King Shepherd
  - Strathblane
  - King Pippin
  - Kingdom
    - King
  - Grand Master
    - Loutch
  - Vernet
  - King Olaf
  - Mount Armstrong

== Pedigree ==
Pedigree of Kingcraft (GB), bay stallion, 1867
Sire King Tom (GB) 1851	Harkaway; 1834	Economist	Whisker*
Sire King Tom (GB) 1851	Harkaway; 1834	Economist	Floranthe
Sire King Tom (GB) 1851	Harkaway; 1834	Fanny Dawson	Nablockish
Sire King Tom (GB) 1851	Harkaway; 1834	Fanny Dawson	Miss Tooley
Sire King Tom (GB) 1851	Pocahontas; 1837	Glencoe	Sultan
Sire King Tom (GB) 1851	Pocahontas; 1837	Glencoe	Trampoline
Sire King Tom (GB) 1851	Pocahontas; 1837	Marpessa	Muley
Sire King Tom (GB) 1851	Pocahontas; 1837	Marpessa	Clare
Dam Woodcraft (GB) 1861	Voltigeur; 1847	Voltaire	Blacklock
Dam Woodcraft (GB) 1861	Voltigeur; 1847	Voltaire	Phantom mare
Dam Woodcraft (GB) 1861	Voltigeur; 1847	Martha Lynn	Mulatto
Dam Woodcraft (GB) 1861	Voltigeur; 1847	Martha Lynn	Leda
Dam Woodcraft (GB) 1861	Venison mare 1849	Venison	Partisan
Dam Woodcraft (GB) 1861	Venison mare 1849	Venison	Fawn
Dam Woodcraft (GB) 1861	Venison mare 1849	Wedding-day	Camel
Dam Woodcraft (GB) 1861	Venison mare 1849	Wedding-day	Margellina* (Family: 11-g)

* Kingcraft is inbred 4S x 5D to the stallion Whisker, meaning that he appears fourth generation on the sire side of his pedigree, and fifth generation (via Margellina) on the dam side of his pedigree.
