= Fred Archer (jockey) =

English jockey (1857–1886)

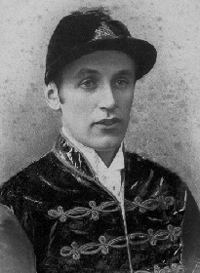

Personal information
- Born: 11 January 1857 Cheltenham, Gloucestershire, England
- Died: 8 November 1886 (aged 29) Newmarket, Cambridgeshire, England
- Occupation: Jockey

Horse racing career
- Sport: Horse racing
- Career wins: 2,748

Major racing wins
- British Classic Race wins: Epsom Oaks (1875, 1878, 1880, 1885); 1,000 Guineas (1875, 1879); 2,000 Guineas (1874, 1879, 1883, 1885); Epsom Derby (1877, 1880, 1881, 1885, 1886); St Leger (1877, 1878, 1881, 1882, 1885, 1886) Other Major British Race wins: St. James's Palace Stakes (1886); Prince of Wales's Stakes (1879, 1881, 1883); Champion Stakes (1878, 1881, 1885, 1886) French Classic Race wins: Prix du Jockey Club (1880, 1883); Grand Prix de Paris (1882, 1885, 1886)

Racing awards
- British flat racing Champion Jockey (1874–1886)

Honours
- Fred Archer Stakes at Newmarket Racecourse

Significant horses
- Bend Or, Iroquois, Ormonde, Melton, Paradox, Wheel of Fortune, Silvio, Atlantic
- Updated on 19 October 2007

Frederick James Archer (11 January 1857 – 8 November 1886), also known by the nickname The Tin Man, was an English flat race jockey of the Victorian era, described as "the best all-round jockey that the turf has ever seen".

He was Champion Jockey for 13 consecutive years until 1886, riding 2,748 winners from 8,084 starts, in so doing setting records for the number of Champion Jockey titles (13), number of wins in a season (246) and number of race wins (2748) which remained unthreatened until the arrival of Steve Donoghue and Sir Gordon Richards well into the 20th century.

Delirious from wasting and the loss of his wife during childbirth, he committed suicide at the age of 29.

== Early life ==
Archer was born at St. George's Cottage, Cheltenham, Gloucestershire on 11 January 1857, the second son of jockey William Archer and Emma Hayward, daughter of publican William Hayward. His elder brother, William, was also a jockey as was his younger brother, Charles, later a trainer. He had at least one sister, Alice.

William Archer was a short, squat man, who had taken a stud of English horses to Russia in 1842, and the year after Fred was born won the Grand National on Little Charlie. He eventually became landlord of the King's Arms public house in Prestbury, near Cheltenham, of which his father-in-law was formerly proprietor. He taught Fred to box.

Emma was "a big, fine-looking woman with handsome aquiline features" who some presumed to have been of good stock. Fred was said to have inherited his spirit from her, even if he adopted his profession from his father. He was only semi-literate.

When Archer was two, the family moved to Prestbury, where he was educated and first learned to ride. A "quick, retentive, and exceedingly secretive boy", by the age of eight he was riding in pony and donkey races, losing his first match on a pony, against a donkey. This may have been one of two races he rode on a pony called Mossrose at Great Malvern. William disciplined him sternly to make him improve. He soon began winning races, even after breaking his leg while out hunting.

In contradiction of his later reputation as a miser, Archer would send money home to his family, who were always in debt. At first it was postal orders for a few shillings, but as his success grew, this increased to fivers and latterly big sums.

== Career ==
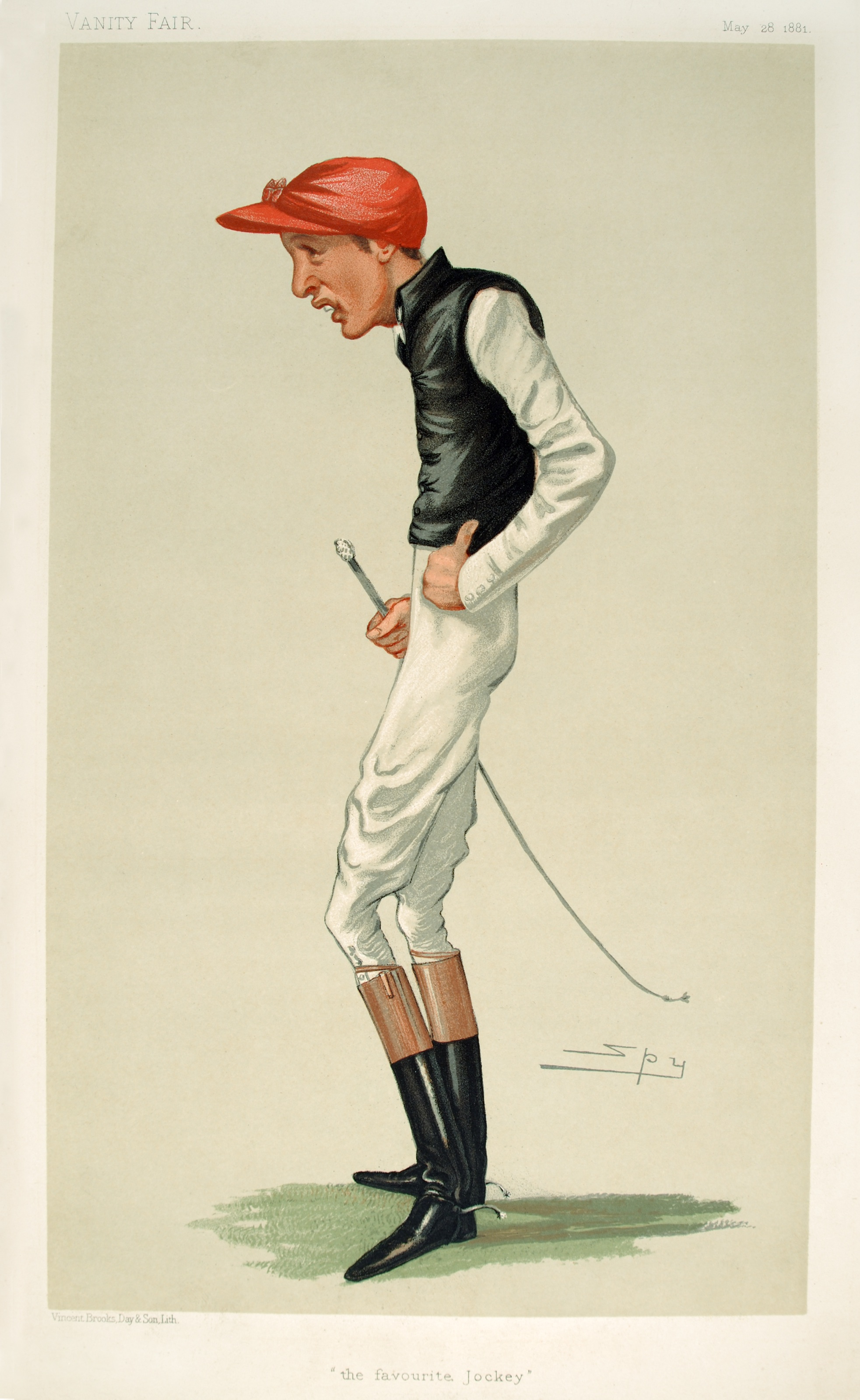
Fred Archer caricature in Vanity Fair

At the suggestion of a hunting acquaintance, William Le Terriere, Archer was apprenticed, for five years, to trainer Mathew Dawson at Heath House in Newmarket, Suffolk, now home to trainer Mark Prescott. Some sources say this was in February 1868, others that it was the day before his 10th birthday. He weighed 4st 11 lb. William and Fred spent a week there, after which Dawson told William, "He will do, Archer, you may leave him." Archer served Dawson as a stable jockey from 1874 until 1886. He married Dawson's niece, Helen Rose Dawson.

At Dawson's stable, the delicate Archer was bullied by the older boys, but with no children of their own, the Dawsons took him almost as a surrogate. Mrs Dawson called him "the little cat", and to Mr Dawson the relationship was close to father and son. His fondness for Mrs Dawson's cake and blackberry jam contributed to his weight gain, and over a good dinner, his weight could rise by 3 or 4 lb He grew to around 5 ft 10 and, over the winter, weighted 11st. He was largely illiterate when he left home but attended a night school run by Mrs Dawson during his early years there.

While at Dawson's, Archer came under the tutelage of Dawson's right-hand man Jockey Swift, who claimed to have taught Archer all he knew, and Tom French. Archer was evidently in high regard at the stable, receiving wages of seven guineas compared to the five guineas typical of apprentices. One of his fellow apprentices was in fact thrown from his horse and killed during Archer's time there. Despite his affection for the lad, Dawson demanded the same discipline of Archer as he did of other apprentices, making him stand to attention for visitors the same as any other lad. But he was aware of his ability. "I have a wonderful boy here who will do marvellous things," he commented.

Because of this, and his father's reputation, he was soon given race-riding opportunities. Aged 12, he was allowed to ride in the Newmarket Town Plate on 14 October 1869, on a three-year-old filly called Honoria. Acting as pacemaker for stablemate Stomboli, who won, Honoria came last. His first win was a steeplechase at Bangor-on-Dee in either 1869 or 1870 on a horse called Maid of Trent for an old pony-racing acquaintance of his family. His first official win under Jockey Club rules was in a two-year-old nursery handicap at Chesterfield on 28 September 1870 on a horse called Atholl Daisy. The horse was trained by John Peart at Malton, rather than Dawson. He finished the season with 2 wins and 9 seconds from 15 rides. His other winner was Lincoln Lass at Ayr.

There is a story, probably apocryphal, that Archer cried because he had not ridden both winners in a dead-heat.

=== 1870s ===
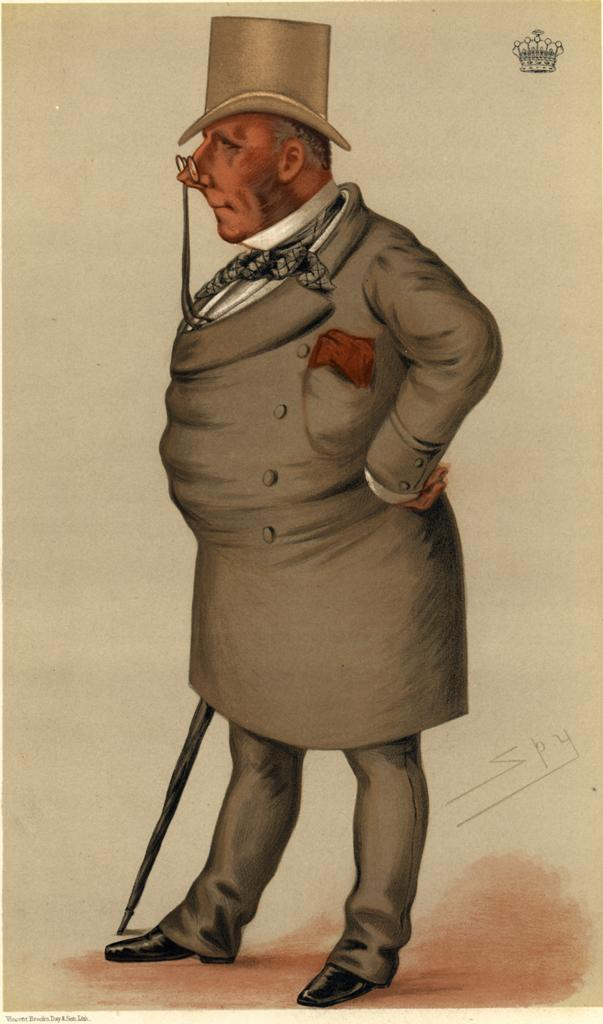
Viscount Falmouth, Archer's patron, in a caricature by Leslie Ward.

Archer's first important win was on Salvanos in the 1872 Cesarewitch, for which he weighed out at 5st 7 lb. It is said he "rode Salvanos with the coolness and steadiness of a veteran and thus made his mark as one of the rising lightweights." When Jem Snowden rode against him for the first time, however, he commented, "Tha cassn't ride for nuts". His apprenticeship ended that year, and Dawson presented him with a gold watch inscribed for "good conduct". Archer in return commented, "I value this more than anything I have and shall keep it as long as I live."

In 1873, with leading stable jockey Tom French sick, Archer had more opportunity to succeed. He rode 107 winners and came second in the championship to Harry Constable. French, who was an influence on the young Archer, died later that year from consumption, brought on by excessive wasting.

The first of Archer's Classic wins followed the next season on Atlantic in the 1874 2,000 Guineas. This made him a "veritable mascotte" for his stable. After this, he became retained jockey for Lord Falmouth, for whom he won over half of his Classics. Falmouth was Dawson's principal owner between 1870 and 1883. Archer's retainer for him was a nominal £100. He finished 1874 with 147 wins from 530 rides. By now, he was riding at 6st, but weight was becoming a problem. For the Cesarewitch Handicap, he failed to make a riding weight of 6st 1 lb, putting up 3 lbs overweight and losing by a neck. Archer blamed wasting for taking his strength away.

Spinaway was the star filly of the following season, winning the 1,000 Guineas and Oaks double.

In 1877, he won his first Derby, on Lord Falmouth's Silvio, and followed up in the St. Leger.

1879 was the championship year of Wheel of Fortune, one of Archer's favourite horses, that he thought was "wonderfully good". She was small, at 15.1 hands (61 inches, 155 cm), leading the Duke of Portland to say she "looked like a polo pony" with Archer's long legs round her. Like Spinaway four years earlier, Wheel of Fortune won both the 1,000 Guineas and Oaks. She won the Yorkshire Oaks in August as well but was prevented an attempt at the Triple Crown when she broke down going for a second race at York two days later.

One of Archer's most notable victories came in the 1880 Derby. He came from behind on Bend Or with an "extraordinary rush", to beat Robert the Devil by a head. He took the inside of the turn at Tattenham Corner, along the rails, with a "nerve of iron".

By the end of the 1870s, he was struggling to make 8st 7 lb.

=== 1880s ===
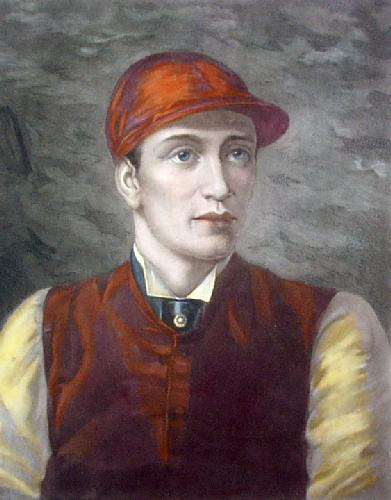
Rosa Corder, Fred Archer, Restrike etching

By the 1880s, his annual income was around £10,000 (equivalent to £1,000,000 in 2025), made up of retainers, gifts from owners and gamblers, and nearly £2,500 in riding fees.

Archer's win on Dutch Oven in the St Leger caused controversy. It had been presumed that the filly had not stayed the distance when losing the Great Yorkshire Stakes at York, so she was sent off at odds of 40/1 for the Leger. When she won, Archer was accused of pulling the horse at York to get longer odds for the Leger. In fact, Archer had not wanted to ride Dutch Oven in the race at all, preferring the John Porter-trained Geheimniss.

Falmouth withdrew from racing in 1883. It has been suggested that this was prompted by a suspicion that Archer pulled Galliard in the Derby, being beaten into third by St Blaise and Highland Chief. Archer was accused of not showing the same will to win that he had on Bend Or or Iroquois, and Highland Chief was trained by his brother Charles, which seemed to be circumstantial evidence of his guilt. Against this, Fred had no previous history of helping his brother in this way, and Charles had once sent him through the rails when riding against him. It seems highly unlikely Archer would have thrown the Derby in this way.

Retainers with the Duke of Portland and Lord Hastings brought him a combined £2,000 per year, the Duke of Westminster £1,000, and Lord Alington £500.

He married Rose Nellie Dawson, eldest daughter of John Dawson, on 31 January 1883 at All Saints' Church in Newmarket. It was called the celebrity wedding of the decade. The whole town was involved, and it concluded with a firework display which had spelled out "May they be happy”.

In January 1884, the couple's infant son, William, died at birth. He had been named after Archer's brother, who had been killed in a hurdle race at Cheltenham. Nellie was left in a critical condition but recovered to become pregnant again almost immediately. On 6 November 1884, she gave birth to a daughter, also Nellie. Fred received a telegram about the birth after riding Thebais to victory in the Liverpool Cup. But the mother was again left dangerously ill after the birth, with symptoms of post-natal eclampsia. Archer arrived home to find his wife was dying. Her convulsions continued until she died. Archer later told a friend, “She did not know me and never spoke to me again."

In 1884, on his only visit to Thirsk Racecourse, his arrival was announced in the market place by the town crier. He had only two rides, but both won Jovial for Tom Green in the High-weight Selling Handicap and Laverock for Matt Dawson in the Sixth Great Yorkshire Foal Stakes. That year, of 377 rides, he won 241.

His most successful year was probably 1885, when he won the 2,000 Guineas on Paradox, the Oaks on Lonely, the Derby and St. Leger on Melton, and the Grand Prix, also on Paradox. In his final season, he won the Derby and St. Leger on Ormonde.

Archer took his sport very seriously and was noted for his ruthlessness. In 1882, he built Falmouth Lodge and Stables (now Pegasus Stables).

In 1885, he rode 246 winners, a record that was unbroken until Gordon Richards' 1933 season. He won The Derby five times and won a total of 21 classic races. In total, he rode 2,748 winners in 8,084 races (some sources say 8,004), a win percentage of over 34%.

== Appearance ==
He was slim, graceful, with remarkably small hands and feet, and eyes of a cold blue-grey, or, according to other sources, sorrowful brown eyes, in a long pale face. He had pronounced front teeth, meaning his lips did not quite meet. He also had a round-shouldered stoop, typical of tall jockeys. He could have passed as a gentleman, and some, including Lord Rosebery, thought he may have been the son of Lord Wilton.

== Personality and critical opinion ==
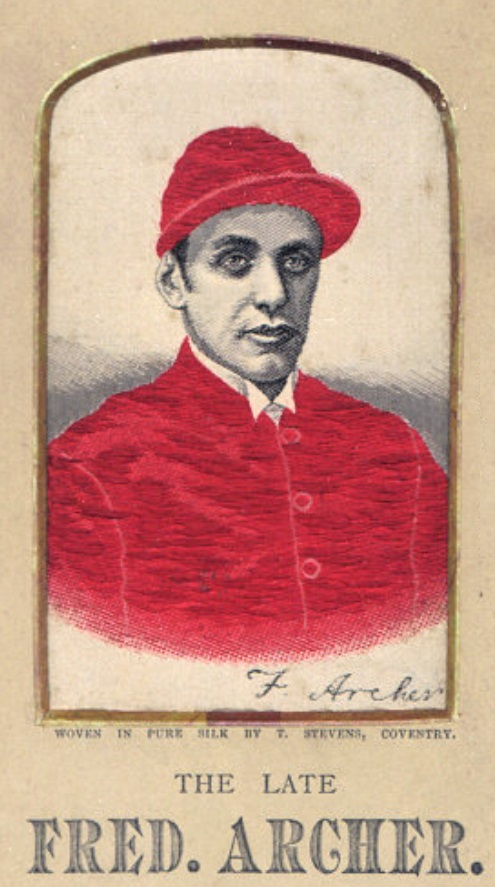
Stevengraph silk-woven portrait of Fred Archer, wearing the racing colours Scarlet jacket and cap of "Mr Manton" (Duchess of Montrose)

Archer "captured the public imagination as no other jockey had ever done".

In his early career he was known as a severe rider, who was not sparing with whip and spurs on the horse. This was a style he may have adopted under the influence of stable jockey Tom French.

He was always first down to the start, so as to get the best starting place and was obedient to the starter, unlike some other jockeys. He was always quick away, "like a greyhound from the slips". He would let his horse's head hang loose, and get the horse going with a touch of the spur.

=== Miserliness ===
He was a taciturn and morose character, known for being miserly with money, hence the nickname "Tin Man". He made shrewd investments of most of his income, but the squandering of much of a reputed £250,000 fortune (equivalent to £28,100,000 in 2025) by the time of his death challenges the perception of acquisitiveness, which may have been partly cultivated. He seemed to take perverse satisfaction in it. He is reputed to have asked bystanders for coins he could put in his breeches to increase his weight when he was short a few pounds for his race, only never to return them. But he could also be generous. He was also known to throw a ball for colleagues each winter, and once, before a trip to America in November 1884, he left a blank cheque for his friend Herbert Mills, in case he was in need.

He was a reckless gambler, with losing runs bringing him close to running out of cash, but he always maintained his integrity, sometimes winning against his own money.

=== Trainer opinion ===
Trainer John Porter said of Archer, "His whole heart and soul were in the business he had in hand. He was almost invariably the first to weigh out, the first at the starting post, the first away as the flag fell, and, as the record shows, very often the first to pass the winning post. I am afraid he was not too scrupulous. Very masterful, he generally had pretty much his own way, especially in minor races. If he did not want a horse to run, he never hesitated to suggest to the owner he should keep the animal in the stable that day. In short, Fred Archer was a powerful personality as well as a brilliantly successful jockey."

Another trainer, John Osborne Jr., said, "He became so conceited that no man believed more in Mr Archer than Fred Archer the jockey", but this was not a universal opinion. In 1879, The World newspaper wrote: "a very large income, the unbounded confidence of employers and public might help to turn less ordinary heads, but Fred Archer quietly goes his own way and studies diligently to improve his calling". And after his death, George Lambton said, "Even when quite a boy he was courted and flattered by every kind of man and woman, and early in life he became the idol of the public... and yet he never suffered from that prevalent and disagreeable complaint, 'swollen head'. I think the shrewd, hard common sense of Mat Dawson, for whom he had the greatest affection and respect, was a great help to him."

Dawson was not entirely complimentary about him, calling him "that damned, long-legged, tin-scrapping young devil".

=== Other comments ===
His sister Alice spoke of him thus: "He was gentle, but he took no liberties himself and no one ever thought of taking one with him. And he was always so quiet. There was never any ranting and raving. He would also rather be two minutes early than two minutes late." Others have said similar. "He was a polite and driven man, whose life would have been so much easier had he been five inches shorter."

Lambton described him as having "the shadow of melancholy in his face which indicated a side to his nature never far absent even in his brightest days". Friend and fellow jockey, Fred Webb, "It is not wasting that makes Archer so thin and worn. He wears that worried look because he cannot ride two winners in one race."

Archer "rode like a man possessed" and "had the devil at his elbow". He could ride rough when necessary, but his success has been attributed primarily to his coolness and to judgement of pace. He had the "passion of a lover for what he did". One contemporary newspaper described him as "all jockey, from the button of his cap to the tips of his spurs, and rode irrespective of the odds. Whether on a 6 to 4 or a 20 to 1 chance he equally strove to win."

In his lifetime, his fame rivalled that of royalty. Once, leaving Ascot Racecourse, the first-class train, full of MPs and members of the aristocracy, was held up for him.

He was particularly popular with women. Lady Hastings wrote "the way in which some women ran after Archer was amazing", and it was widely believed that the Duchess of Montrose (1818–1894) (who raced under the pseudonym "Mr Manton"), who was 40 years older than Archer, wanted to marry him, and she invited him to her home and the theatre. In 1888, aged 70, she married her third husband, aged 24.

In the end, Archer outgrew his profession. London cab drivers would shout "Archer's up" to mean that everything was all right with the world.

== Death ==
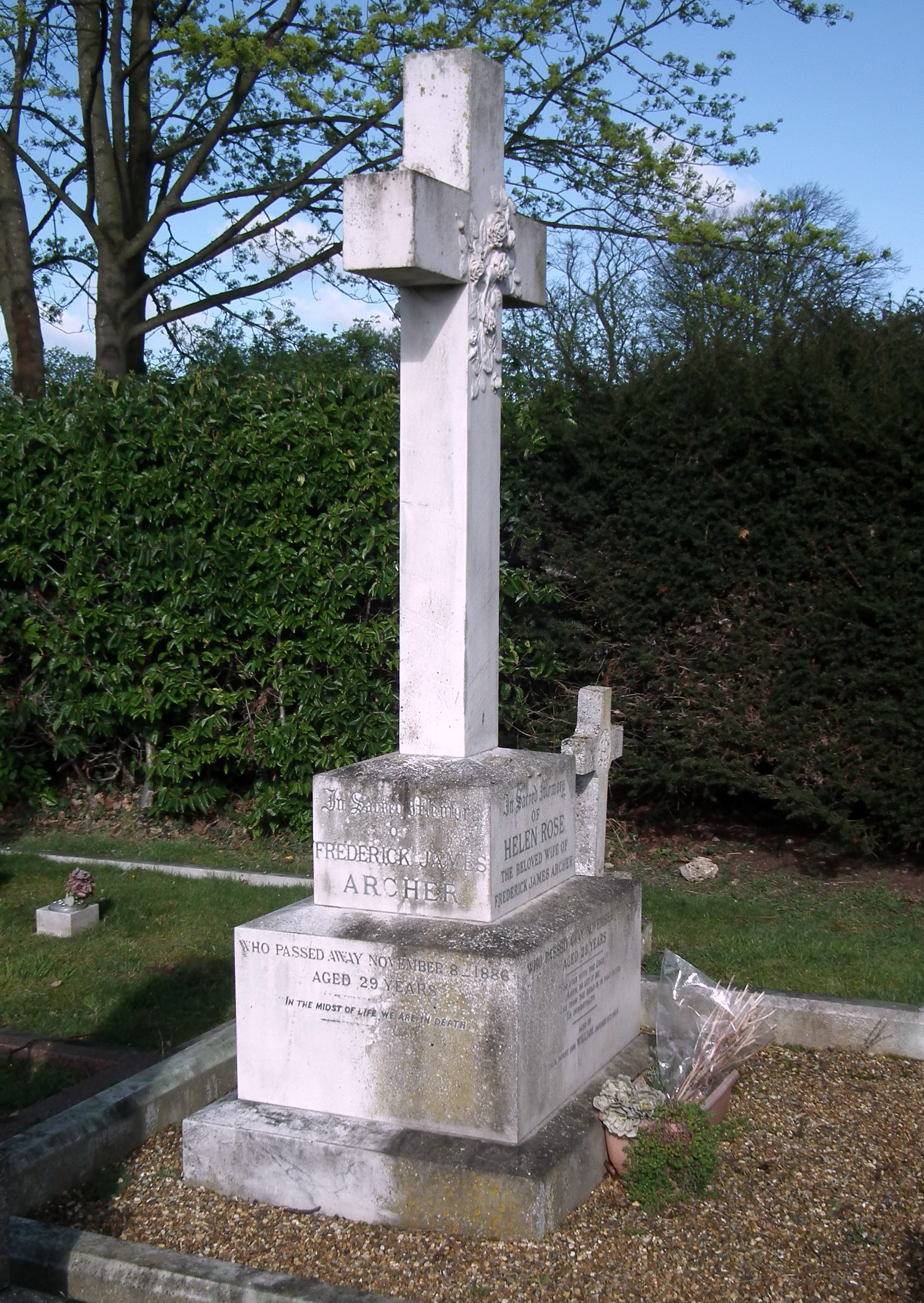
Grave of jockey Frederick James Archer, Newmarket, Suffolk

Because of his height (5 ft 10in/1.78 m) Archer had to diet far more than other jockeys. His racing weight was 8st 10 lb in later years, and to keep to it he used Victorian Turkish baths, abstained almost totally from solid food, and used alkaline medicines to purge. A Newmarket doctor, JR Wright, created a special purgative which became known as "Archer's Mixture", which he drank by the sherry glass. His diet consisted of half an orange, a sardine and a nip of champagne, or castor oil, a biscuit and a small champagne at midday, and he once left the dining room on the sight of a steak and kidney pie. He was a poor walker, and could hardly run, which reduced his ability to lose weight through exercise.

In October 1886, he had to lose 6 lbs over two days for his first and, ultimately, only ride in Ireland: Cambusmore for Lord Londonderry in the Lieutenant's Plate at the Curragh, a race he won easily. On his return, he wasted down to 8st 7 lb for the Cambridgeshire by going three days without food. This was still 1 lb overweight and cost him the race on St Mirin, as he was beaten by a head. The afternoon was very cold, and he fell seriously ill. He still undertook engagements at Brighton and on the first day at Lewes on the Thursday, but here he is reported to have "taken a chill" which "developed into fever of a typhoid character", forcing him to return home. He was declared ill on the Saturday, and by Sunday he was in a state of high fever.

The next day, Monday 8 November 1886, he was at his residence, Falmouth House, Newmarket, under medical supervision. About 2.25pm his sister, Mrs Colman, visited him in his room and he asked her to send the nurse away. Colman was looking out of the window when Archer got out of bed. She then heard him say "Are they coming?" and saw he had the gun in his hand. She sprang towards him, and while she was struggling with him, he put the gun in his mouth and fired the revolver. He died bleeding in her arms, the bullet having passed out of the back of his neck. The doctor was on the scene very quickly and pronounced him dead. The verdict of the jury at the inquest was: "That the deceased committed suicide whilst in a state of unsound mind". His death at the age of 29 occurred on 8 November 1886; his wife had died on 7 November, two years earlier.

The death of his wife was a factor. "Poor Nellie! She was my glory, my pride, my life, my all," he had earlier told a friend. "She was taken from me at the very moment that my happiness did really seem to me to be so great and complete as to leave nothing else in this world that I could wish for." He was also £30,000 in debt on his betting, exacerbated by having heavily backed St Mirin. He had reportedly not been his "old self" for the past year.

The gun had been bought because Falmouth House was in an exposed location and he had had trouble with housebreakers.

He was buried in Newmarket cemetery on 12 November. Wreaths were sent by the Duke of Westminster and the Prince of Wales. His burial plot can be found there to the right of the chapel.

He left a fortune of £66,662 (equal to about £7.5 million today) to his only daughter, the inheritance being looked after by trustees during her minority. At one time, he was rumoured to be worth £250,000. Some of his effects are now on display at the National Horseracing Museum, including the gun with which he shot himself.

News of Archer's death reached far beyond racing. In London, special editions of the evening newspapers were issued, with crowds queuing in Fleet Street to buy them, and omnibuses stopped to allow commuters to read the billboards. The adoration the public showed for him was close to that shown for Diana, Princess of Wales over a century later.

He was survived by his second child, Nellie, who was brought up by her grandparents in the Newmarket area. She married shipping magnate Max Tosetti in 1911.

== Legacy ==
Archer's life has been fictionalised in three books: The Tinman's Farewell by Michael Tanner and Just One More Smile by his great-granddaughter Diana Foster and, more tangentially, Dear Fred by K M Peyton.

His death is the subject of Peter Lovesey's "Bertie and the Tinman', in which the Prince of Wales, dissatisfied with the coroner's verdict, sets out to investigate the death.

His ghost is said to ride a light grey horse over Newmarket Heath.

== Statistics by year ==
- 1869 – 2 / 15
- 1870 – 3 / 40
- not known
- 1872 – 27 / not known
- 1874 – 147 / 530
- 1882 – 195 / 512
- 1884 – 241 / 377

== Classic race victories ==
(United Kingdom) Great Britain

- Epsom Derby – Silvio (1877), Bend Or (1880), Iroquois (1881), Melton (1885), Ormonde (1886)
- Epsom Oaks – Spinaway (1875), Jannette (1878), Wheel of Fortune (1880), Lonely (1885)
- 1,000 Guineas – Spinaway (1875), Wheel of Fortune (1879)
- 2,000 Guineas – Atlantic (1874), Charibert (1879), Galliard (1883), Paradox (1885)
- St. Leger – Silvio (1877), Jannette (1878), Iroquois (1881), Dutch Oven (1882), Melton (1885), Ormonde (1886)

France

- Grand Prix de Paris – Bruce (1882), Paradox (1885), Minting (1886)
- Prix du Jockey Club – Beauminet (1880), Frontin (1883)

== See also ==
- List of jockeys

== Bibliography ==
- Mortimer, Roger; Onslow, Richard; Willett, Peter (1978). Biographical Encyclopaedia of British Racing. London: Macdonald and Jane's. ISBN 0-354-08536-0.
- Tanner, Michael; Cranham, Gerry (1992). Great Jockeys of the Flat - A celebration of two centuries of jockeyship. Guinness. ISBN 978-0-85112-989-1.
