= Evelyn Boscawen, 6th Viscount Falmouth =

British racehorse breeder

The Viscount Falmouth
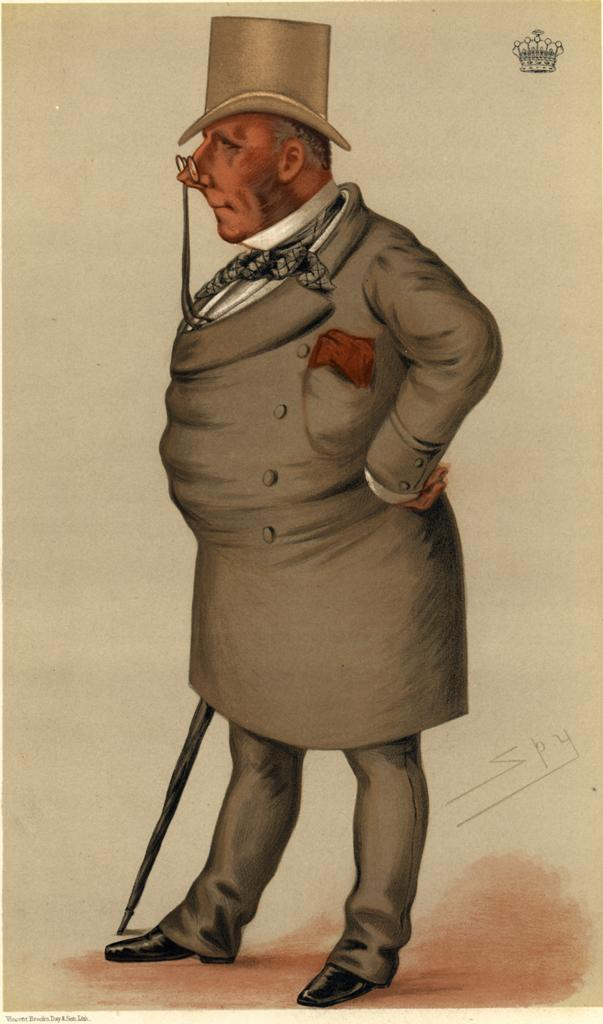
- Evelyn Boscawen, 6th Viscount Falmouth, in a caricature by Leslie Ward.
- Born: 18 March 1819
- Died: 6 November 1889 (aged 70)
- Education: Eton College; University of Oxford
- Occupation: Horse breeder
- Spouse: Mary Frances Elizabeth Stapleton
- Children: Mary Elizabeth Frances Catherine; Evelyn Edward Thomas; Hugh le Despencer; Edith Maria; Mabel Emma; John Richard De Clare
- Parent(s): John Evelyn Boscawen and Catherine Elizabeth Annesley

Evelyn Boscawen, 6th Viscount Falmouth (18 March 1819 – 6 November 1889), was a breeder of race horses and the winner of many classic races.

== Personal life ==
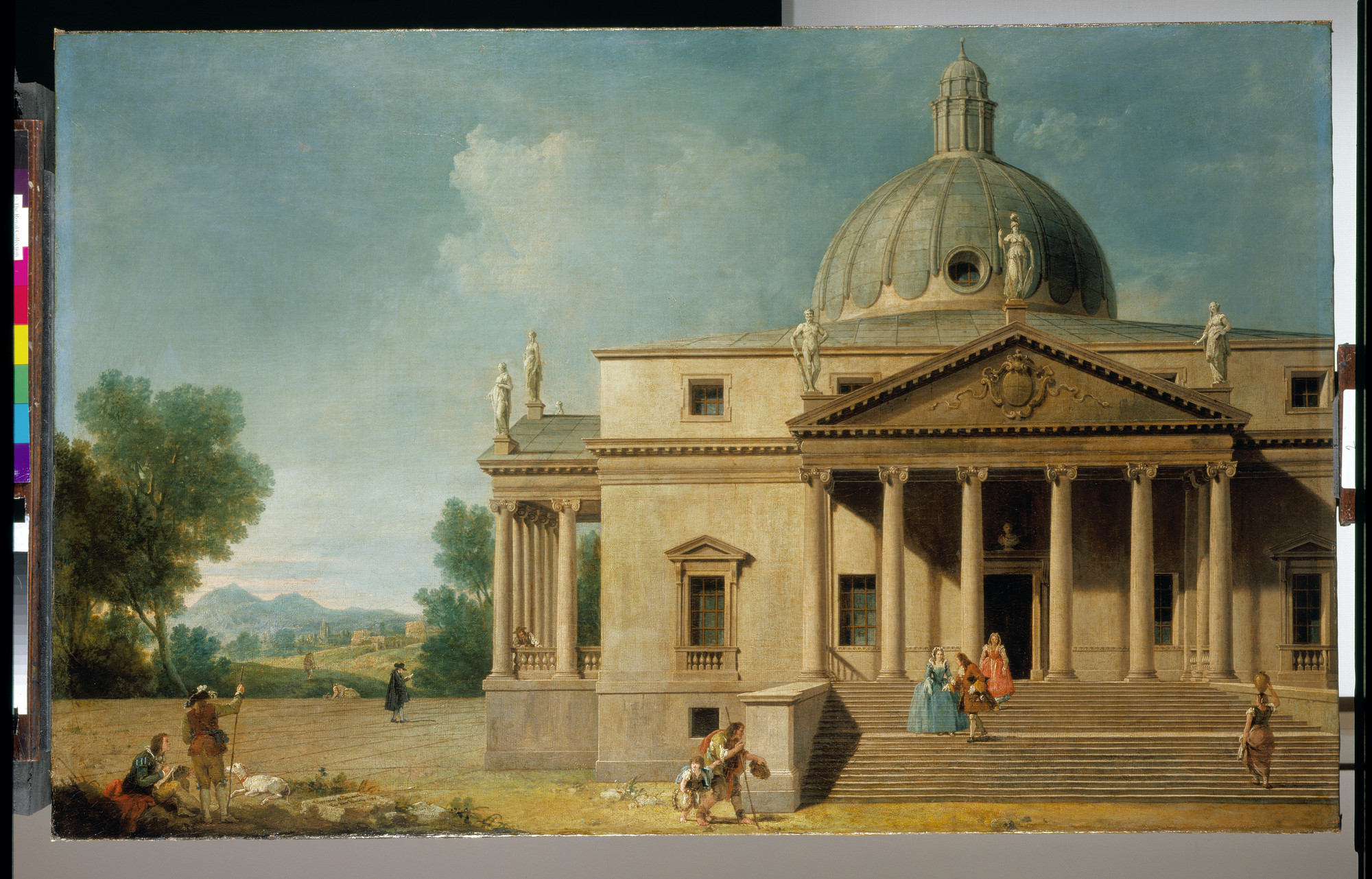
Capriccio with a view of Mereworth Castle, Kent

His parents were the Reverend Hon John Evelyn Boscawen, Canon of Canterbury, (1790– 12 April 1851) and Catherine Elizabeth Annesley (died 30 July 1859). Boscawen was educated at Eton College and the University of Oxford and was called to the bar in 1841. On his marriage to Mary Frances Elizabeth Stapleton (24 March 1822 – 20 November 1891) on 29 July 1845, he acquired Mereworth Castle, near Maidstone, Kent. His wife was the 17th Baroness le Despencer. They had six children:-

1. Hon Mary Elizabeth Frances Catherine (1846– 21 January 1916)
2. Evelyn Edward Thomas, 7th Viscount Falmouth (24 July 1847 – 1 October 1918)
3. Hon Hugh le Despenser (28 February 1849 – 8 April 1908), married Lady Mary FitzWilliam daughter of the William Wentworth-Fitzwilliam, 6th Earl Fitzwilliam
4. Hon Edith Maria (1851– 24 September 1906)
5. Hon Mabel Emma (1855– 26 October 1927), married Charles H B Williams, of Bodelwyddan Castle, Denbighshire on 18 April 1882
6. Hon John Richard de Clare (19 December 1860 – 12 December 1915)

His wife's aunt was Anne Frances Bankes, wife of Edward Boscawen, 1st Earl of Falmouth and mother of the 2nd Earl.

On the death of his first cousin, George Boscawen, 2nd Earl of Falmouth (8 July 1811 – 29 August 1852), he succeeded to the titles of Viscount and 6th Baron of Boscawen Rose, Cornwall. He also succeeded to the family seat of the Boscawens at Tregothnan.

Lord Falmouth died on 6 November 1889 and is buried at St Lawrence's Church, Mereworth.

== Horse racing ==
In 1845 following his marriage, he had access to Mereworth Castle in Kent which became the site of a large and successful stud, breeding Thoroughbred horses, and winning many classic races. He originally used the pseudonym Mr Valentine when he first started to race horses; his horses were first trained by John Scott at Malton, North Yorkshire and when Scott died in 1871 he had them trained by Mathew Dawson at Newmarket. Fred Archer, an apprentice of Dawson's, became Lord Falmouth's retained jockey in 1874 following Archer's win in that years 2,000 Guineas. Archer is described by the National Horseracing Museum as ″... the best all-round jockey that the Turf has ever seen ...″, winning 2,748 races including 21 Classics – over half were for Lord Falmouth.

Lord Falmouth was first on the list of winning owners in 1877, 1878 and 1880, and finished second in 1879. His winnings for 1880 was £16,061 with Bal Gal winning eight races and contributing more than £10,000 in prize money. His success in the Classics was such that Lord Rosebery had a special form printed on which to send him congratulations. Lord Falmouth retired from racing in January 1884 and was presented with a silver shield by Mathew Dawson and Fred Archer. His race horses were sold by auction at Matthew Dawson's paddock at Newmarket on 28 April 1884. The total sum realised was 36,420 guineas at an average of 1,517 1/2 per horse. Busybody raised 8,800 guineas and Harvester raised 8,600, the latter sold to Sir John Willoughby. His breeding stud was sold on 30 June 1884.

=== Classic race victories ===
(United Kingdom) Great Britain

- Epsom Derby winners – 1870: Kingcraft, 1877: Silvio
- 1,000 Guineas winners – 1862: Hurricane, 1873: Cecilia, 1875: Spinaway, 1879: Wheel of Fortune
- 2,000 Guineas winners – 1874: Atlantic, 1879: Charibert, 1883: Galliard
- Epsom Oaks winners – 1863: Queen Bertha, 1875: Spinaway, 1878: Jannette, 1880: Wheel of Fortune
- St. Leger winners – 1877: Silvio, 1878: Jannette, 1882: Dutch Oven

=== Some of his horses ===
- Atlantic
- Bal Gal – won eight races in 1880, accumulating more than £10,000 in prizemoney
- Busybody
- Cecilia
- Charibert – winner of the 2000 Guineas Stakes in 1879
- Childerie
- Dutch Oven
- Flax
- Gamos
- Harvester
- Hurricane – winner of 1,000 Guineas in 1862
- Jannette
- Kingcraft – winner of The Derby in 1870
- Lady Golightly
- Queen Bertha – winner of The Oaks in 1863 and dam (mother) of Wheel of Fortune.
- Silvio – winner of The Derby in 1877
- Spinaway
- Wheel of Fortune

The Falmouth Stakes was named in honour of Evelyn Boscawen and established in 1911. Originally restricted to three-year-old fillies it is now open to fillies and mares aged three years or older and run on the July Course at Newmarket over a distance of 1 mile (1,609 metres). It is scheduled to take place each year in July.

== Tregothnan Botanical Gardens ==
The gardens are first recorded in 1695 by the traveller, Celia Fiennes, in her book Through England on a Side-Saddle, when she visited Hugh Boscawen, a relative through marriage. The present gardens were developed by Evelyn Boscawen and his brother the Honourable and Reverend John Townshend Boscawen, who was rector of the nearby parish of Lamorran.

== See also ==
- Earl of Falmouth
- Viscount Falmouth

Peerage of Great Britain
Preceded by George Boscawen	Viscount Falmouth; 1852–1889	Succeeded by Evelyn Boscawen
