= Mathew Dawson =

British racehorse trainer

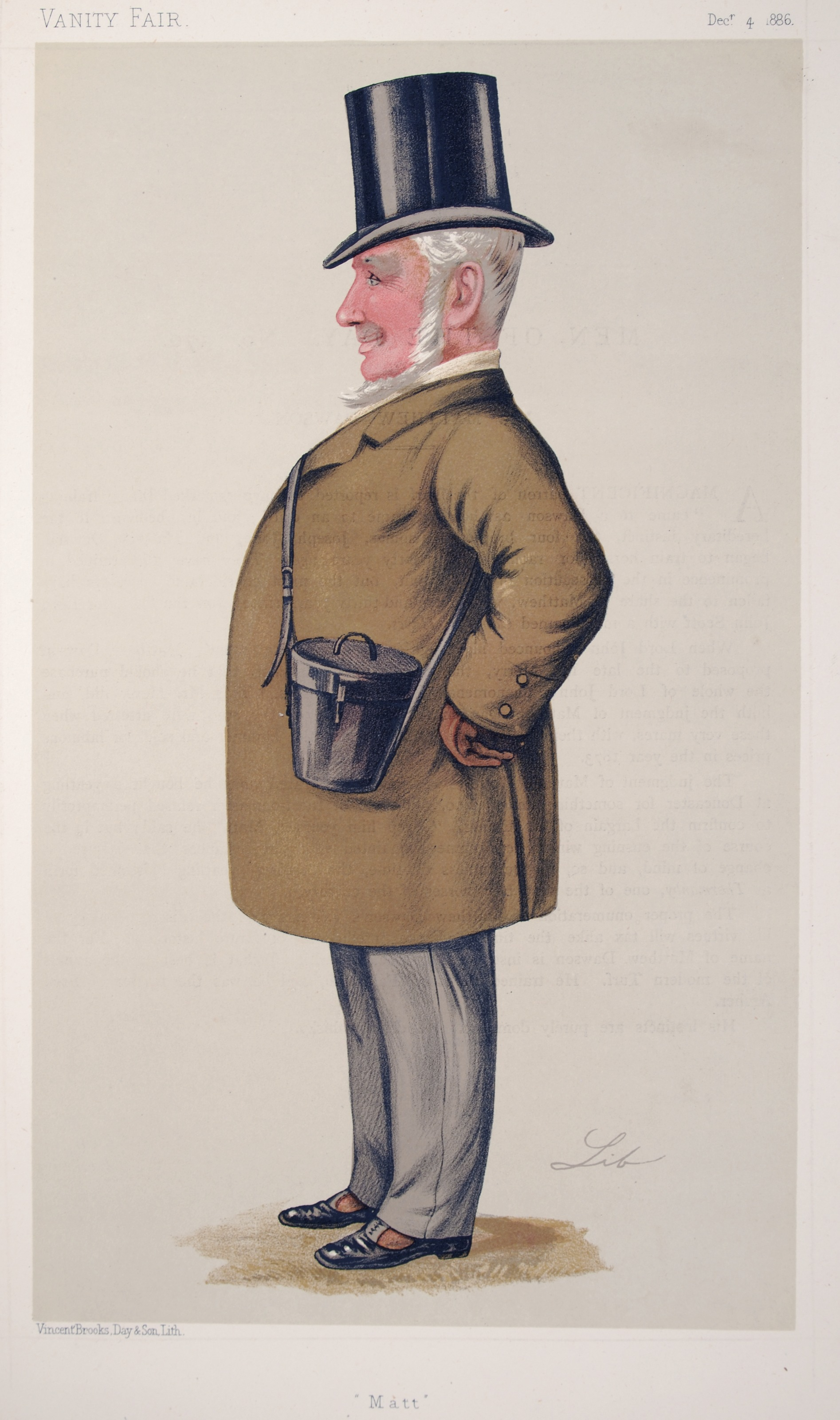
- Caricature of Mathew Dawson, 1886

Personal information
- Born: 9 January 1820 Gullane, Scotland, Great Britain
- Died: 18 August 1898 (aged 78)
- Occupation: Trainer

Horse racing career
- Sport: Horse racing

Major racing wins
- British Classic Race wins: 2,000 Guineas (5); 1,000 Guineas (5); Epsom Oaks (5); Epsom Derby (6); St. Leger Stakes (7)

Significant horses
- St. Simon, Melton, Ladas, Sir Visto, Minting, Atlantic.

Mathew Dawson (1820–1898) was a British racehorse trainer. In a career which lasted from 1840 until his death in 1898 he trained the winners of twenty-eight British Classic Races, a figure surpassed by only two other men. He was significant as one of the first trainers to run a public stable, rather than being the employee of a wealthy patron. He was based for most of his career at Newmarket, Suffolk. His first name is sometimes recorded as "Matthew", but "Mathew" is more usual.

== Background ==
Dawson was born at his family's home, Stamford Hall, Gullane, Haddingtonshire in 1820. His father George Dawson, his elder brother Thomas and his younger brother John were all racehorse trainers. He was apprenticed to his father and worked in 1838 for his brother Thomas at his stables at Middleham, North Yorkshire.

== Training career ==
Dawson began training racehorses in Scotland in 1840, where his main patrons were Lord Kelburn and William Hope Johnstone. His most important winner in this period was The Era, who won the Northumberland Plate in 1845. He also sent a horse called Pathfinder to run in The Derby, but the horse finished last, almost a furlong behind the other runners.

In 1846, Dawson moved to England to become the stud manager and private trainer for Lord John Scott at Yew Tree Cottage at Compton, Berkshire. While working for Scott he recorded his first Royal Ascot win in 1851 and trained his first Classic winner when Catherine Hayes won The Oaks in 1853. When Scott sold his horses to James Merry in 1857, Dawson continued to train them but moved his base to Russley Park, near Lambourn. For Merry, Dawson trained Sunbeam to win the St Leger in 1858 and Thormanby to win the 1860 Derby.

In 1866, Dawson moved to Newmarket, basing himself first at St Mary's Square and then Heath House, where he had his greatest successes. His first important owners were the Dukes of Newcastle and Hamilton, but they were soon succeeded by Lord Falmouth. For Falmouth, Dawson trained the winners of fourteen classics between 1870 and 1883 including two Derbies with Kingcraft and Silvio. During this period he was also closely involved with the jockey Fred Archer who came to Dawson as an apprentice in 1868 and became his stable jockey in 1874. Other important owners who sent their horses to Dawson included the Duke of Portland, for whom he trained St. Simon, who was ineligible for the Classics but was regarded by Dawson as the best horse he ever trained. Dawson trained a fourth Derby winner when Lord Hastings' colt Melton won in 1885.

In 1885, Dawson retired from large-scale training and moved to Exning Manor, which he renamed Melton House. Although he was now in charge of a much smaller number of horses, he continued to have considerable success, winning Classics with the fillies Mimi and Minthe and sending out Minting to win the Grand Prix de Paris. By 1891 Dawson intended to retire completely, but was persuaded to handle a few horses for Lord Rosebery. Now in his seventies, and often unable to walk because of chronic gout, Dawson won a further four Classics for Rosebery, including successive Derby winners in 1894 (Sir Visto) and 1895 (Ladas).

Mathew Dawson died at Newmarket on 20 August 1898. It was said of him that in an era in which the sport was often tainted by corruption and dishonesty, he left behind "a reputation which an archbishop might envy."

== Family ==
Dawson married Mary Rose (d. 1895) in 1844. The couple had no children. Dawson's nephew, George Dawson, took over Heath House after his uncle's semi-retirement and trained the winners of ten Classics including Ayrshire and Donovan.

== Sources ==
Seccombe, Thomas (1901). "Dawson, Matthew" . In Lee, Sidney (ed.). Dictionary of National Biography (1st supplement). London: Smith, Elder & Co.
