= Rous Memorial Stakes =

- Class: Horse
- Location: Ascot Racecourse; Ascot, England
- Inaugurated: 1878
- Race type: Flat / Thoroughbred

Race information
- Distance: 1 mile (1,609 metres)
- Surface: Turf
- Qualification: Three-years-old and up

The Rous Memorial Stakes was a flat horse race in Great Britain open to Thoroughbreds aged three years and over. It was run at Ascot Racecourse in June.

== History ==
The Rous Memorial Stakes at Ascot was first run in 1878 as a one-mile race with a subscription of £10 each with £1000 added. The race commemorated Henry John Rous, who had died the previous year. Rous was the official handicapper and developed the Weight for Age system.

In the latter part of the nineteenth century there were several races run under the title of Rous Memorial Stakes, most notably a two-year-old race at Goodwood.

It has been discontinued.

== Early winners ==
| Year | Winner | Age | Jockey | Trainer | Owner | Time | Ref. |
|---|---|---|---|---|---|---|---|
| 1878 | Petrarch | 5 | Fred Archer | Joseph Cannon | 4th Earl of Lonsdale |
| 1879 | Phoenix | 4 | James Goater |
| 1880 | Rayon d'Or | 4 | James Goater | Tom Jennings | Count de Lagrange |
| 1881 | Petronel | 4 | | | 8th Duke of Beaufort |
| 1882 | Retreat | 5 | Fred Archer | | 3rd Earl of Bradford |
| 1883 | Chislehurst | 3 | Charles Wood | | C. Perkins |
| 1884 | Lucerne | 4 | Tom Cannon | | Mr. de Rothschild |
| 1885 | Isobar | 3 | Kaye Tomlinson | | 3rd Earl of Bradford |
| 1886 | St. Gatien | 5 | Charles Wood | James Waugh | Jack Hammond |
| 1887 | Ormonde | 4 | Tom Cannon | John Porter | 1st Duke of Westminster |
| 1888 | Phil | 4 | Tom Cannon | | H T Fenwick | 1:45 |
| 1889 | Love-in-Idleness | 3 | Tom Cannon | | Prince Soltykoff |
| 1890 | St. Serf | 3 | Tommy Loates | | 6th Duke of Portland | 1:44.2 |
| 1891 | Amphion | 5 | Tom Cannon | Chandler | General Byrne |
| 1892 | Orvieto | 4 | John Watts | | J. H. Houldsworth |
| 1893 | Orme | 4 | Morny Cannon | John Porter | 1st Duke of Westminster |
| 1894 | Court Ball | 3 | Fred Finlay | | 5th Earl Cadogan |
| 1895 | The Lombard | 3 | Tommy Loates | | H. McCalmont |

== See also ==
- Horseracing in Great Britain
- List of British flat horse races
