= Meddler (horse) =

British-bred Thoroughbred racehorse

- Sire: St. Gatien
- Grandsire: The Rover
- Dam: Busybody
- Damsire: Petrarch
- Sex: Stallion
- Foaled: 1890
- Country: Great Britain
- Colour: Bay
- Breeder: George Alexander Baird
- Owner: 1) George Alexander Baird; 2) William H. Forbes; 3) William C. Whitney; 4) Clarence Mackay
- Trainer: Joseph Cannon
- Record: 3: 3-0-0
- Earnings: £3,427

Major wins
- British Dominion Stakes (1892); Chesterfield Stakes (1892); Dewhurst Plate (1892)

Awards
- Leading sire in North America (1904, 1906)

Meddler (1890–1916) was a British Thoroughbred racehorse who was a leading two-year-old in England, when he won all three starts including the Dewhurst Plate. He was then sold to America where he became the leading sire in 1904 and 1906.

== Background ==
Bred and raced by George Baird, his sire, St. Gatien, dead heated for the win in the 1884 Epsom Derby and won the 1885 Ascot Gold Cup. His dam was Baird's brilliant racing mare, Busybody, winner of the 1884 Epsom Oaks and 1000 Guineas Stakes.

== Racing career ==
Meddler won all three starts at age two and was regarded as second only to Isinglass among the colts of his generation. The last of his wins came in the Dewhurst Stakes at Newmarket on October 27 when he led all the way to beat Raeburn by half a length. According to rules governing the sport of British horse racing in effect at the time, when his owner George Alexander Baird died, all of Meddler's future race bookings were void. As such, Meddler could not race in the British Classic Races at age three and was sold for $76,000 to American William H. Forbes of Readville, Massachusetts who brought him to the United States in 1893 to stand at his Neponset Stud. On Forbes' death in 1894, Meddler was purchased by William Collins Whitney of New York City who sent him to stand at stud at his La Belle Stud at Lexington, Kentucky.

== Stud record ==
Among Meddler's offspring, his grandson Royal Tourist won a 1908 American Classic, the Preakness Stakes, and set a World Record time on dirt in winning the Winters Handicap at Emeryville Race Track in Oakland, California. In 1905 Meddler's daughter, Tanya, became the second filly to ever win the Belmont Stakes. In 1906 his son Go Between's wins included the extremely important Suburban Handicap and was the retrospective American Champion Older Male Horse.

Through his daughter, Mineola, Meddler was the dam sire of Johren, the 1918 American Horse of the Year, and, from Miss Minnie, he was the damsire of 1921 American Horse of the Year and U.S. Racing Hall of Fame inductee, Grey Lag.

Clarence Mackay bought Meddler for $51,000 at the dispersal sale of William Collins Whitney's horses. MacKay stood him at William S. Fanshawe's Silverbrook Farm in New Jersey, then at Kingston Farm run by Foxhall A. Daingerfield near Lexington, Kentucky. Meddler was eventually sent to a breeding operation in France where he died at age twenty-six on April 17, 1916.

== Pedigree ==
Pedigree of Meddler (GB), bay horse, 1890
Sire St. Gatien	The Rover	The Flying Dutchman	Bay Middleton
Sire St. Gatien	The Rover	The Flying Dutchman	Barbelle
Sire St. Gatien	The Rover	Meeanee	Touchstone
Sire St. Gatien	The Rover	Meeanee	Ghuznee
Sire St. Gatien	Saint Editha	Kingley Vale	Nutbourne
Sire St. Gatien	Saint Editha	Kingley Vale	Bannerdale
Sire St. Gatien	Saint Editha	Lady Alice	Chanticleer
Sire St. Gatien	Saint Editha	Lady Alice	Agnes
Dam Busybody	Petrarch	Lord Clifden	Newminster
Dam Busybody	Petrarch	Lord Clifden	The Slave
Dam Busybody	Petrarch	Laura	Orlando
Dam Busybody	Petrarch	Laura	Torment
Dam Busybody	Spinaway	Macaroni	Sweetmeat
Dam Busybody	Spinaway	Macaroni	Jocose
Dam Busybody	Spinaway	Queen Bertha	Kingston
Dam Busybody	Spinaway	Queen Bertha	Flax (family 1-w)
