= Miss Jummy =

British-bred Thoroughbred racehorse

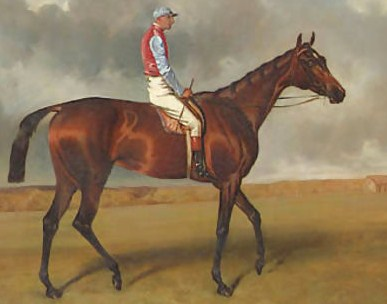
- Miss Jummy and John Watts, by John Arnold Alfred Wheeler
- Sire: Petrarch
- Grandsire: Lord Clifden
- Dam: Lady Portland
- Damsire: The Primate
- Sex: Mare
- Foaled: 1883
- Country: United Kingdom
- Colour: Bay
- Breeder: William Douglas-Hamilton, 12th Duke of Hamilton
- Owner: Duke of Hamilton
- Trainer: Richard Marsh
- Record: 17:9-1-1

Major wins
- 1000 Guineas (1886); Epsom Oaks (1886); Nassau Stakes (1886); Park Hill Stakes (1886)

Miss Jummy (1883–1889) was a British Thoroughbred racehorse and broodmare who won two British Classic Races in 1886. In a career that lasted from July 1885 to September 1886 the filly ran fifteen times and won eight races at distances ranging from five furlongs to one and three quarter miles. As a two-year-old in 1885, Miss Jummy won three times from seven starts, but when tried in the highest class she was unplaced behind the future Triple Crown winner Ormonde in the Dewhurst Stakes. In 1886, Miss Jummy was unbeaten when racing against her own age and sex, winning five races including the 1000 Guineas at Newmarket, the Oaks at Epsom, the Nassau Stakes at Goodwood and the Park Hill Stakes at Doncaster. She was unsuccessful in open competition, finishing unplaced in the Grand Prix de Paris and the Eclipse Stakes. At the end of 1886 she was retired to stud where her record was disappointing.

== Background ==
Miss Jummy was a bay filly with a white star bred by her owner the 12th Duke of Hamilton. She was sired by Petrarch, a horse which won the 2000 Guineas and the St Leger Stakes in 1876. At stud Petrarch was particularly successful as a sire of fillies: his other daughters included Busybody (1000 Guineas and Oaks) and Throstle (St Leger). Her dam, Lady Portland, was not a successful racehorse but was descended from Alice Hawthorn, who won fifty-two races and became an influential broodmare.

The Duke of Hamilton named his filly in honour of his friend, the Duke of Portland, who was known to his friends by the nickname Jumbo or Jummy. The filly was trained at Lordship Farm in Newmarket, Suffolk by Richard Marsh and was ridden to her most important victories races by John Watts.

== Racing career ==
=== 1885: two-year-old season ===
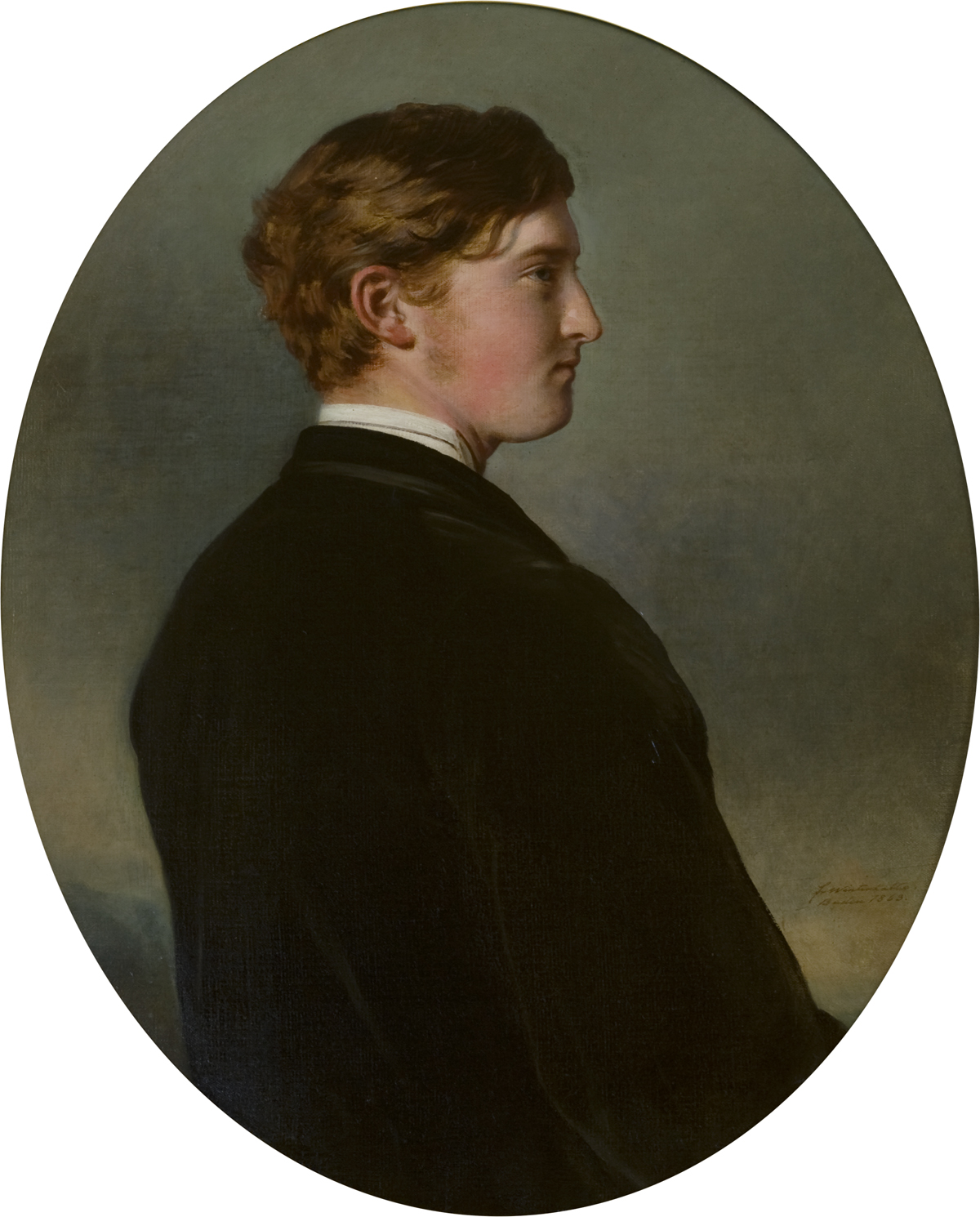
The Duke of Hamilton, Miss Jummy's owner.

At Goodwood on 28 July, Miss Jummy made her first appearance in the Richmond Stakes. She started a 20/1 outsider and was never in contention before finishing sixth of the seven runners behind Sunrise.

Miss Jummy ran twice at the first October meeting at Newmarket. She won the £900 Buckenham Stakes from three opponents including Argo Navis to record her first win, and returned later in the week to beat The Cob in the £1100 Rutland Stakes.

On the opening day of the second October meeting, Miss Jummy ran in the £897 Clearwell Stakes. Carrying the top weight of 125 pounds, she started at odds of 100/15 in a field consisting of six colts and two fillies. Miss Jummy took the lead in the final quarter mile and held off a late challenge from Martinet to win "cleverly" by three quarters of a length. Three days later she reappeared in the Great Challenge Stakes, a weight-for-age race over six furlongs. She carried 97 pounds and Watts was replaced by a lightweight jockey. The filly became agitated before the start, and after being among the early leaders, she dropped back to finish fifth of the seven runners behind Modwena.

Two weeks later, Miss Jummy returned to Newmarket for the Houghton meeting and started second favourite behind the unbeaten colt Ormonde in the seven furlong Dewhurst Stakes. She reached third place two furlongs from the finish but faded into sixth as Ormonde won easily by four lengths. On her final race of the season she won a Post Sweepstakes later that week, but was disqualified when she found to be carrying an incorrect weight.

=== 1886: three-year-old season ===
==== Spring ====
Miss Jummy began her three-year-old season in The Riddlesworth over the Ditch Mile course at the Newmarket Craven meeting in mid-April. She led from the start and won by half a length from her only opponent, a colt named Oberon. On 30 April, Miss Jummy started at odds of 3/1 for in the 1000 Guineas over Newmarket's Rowley Mile course. The field of nine included her former opponents Modwena (the 2/1 favourite), Sunrise and Argo Navis. When the race began the outsider Sagitta rushed to the front and opened up a lead of twenty lengths before tiring rapidly after half distance. As Sagitta dropped back, Watts took over the lead on Miss Jummy just ahead of Cataract, Argo Navis and Modwena. Miss Jummy increased her advantage in the final furlong and comfortably held the challenge of Argo Navis to win the £3,250 prize by one and a half lengths; Jewel Song finished a head in front of Modwena to take third place.

==== Summer ====
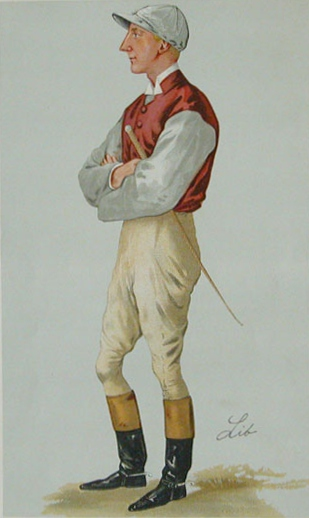
John Watts, Miss Jummy's regular jockey.

Four weeks later, Miss Jummy moved up in distance for the Oaks over one and a half miles at Epsom. She was made the even money favourite in a field of twelve fillies, with her most serious challenger appearing to be Braw Lass, a filly who had finished a close second to Minting in the Middle Park Plate. Watts restrained the favourite in the early stages as Storm Light set a very slow pace. Miss Jummy turned into the straight in fourth place before overtaking Storm Light approaching the final furlong. She won the race easily by half a length from Argo Navis, who finished strongly after being badly hampered, with Braw Lass a full length behind in third. The prize for the winner was £3,250.

Nine days after her victory at Epsom, Miss Jummy was sent to France to contest the Grand Prix de Paris at Longchamp Racecourse. In a field of six colts and two fillies for the £4,000 prize, she started 7/2 second favourite behind Minting. She raced in second place for much of the 3000 metre distance, but tired on the heavy ground and was virtually pulled up by Watts in the closing stages. On her next appearance, Miss Jummy took part in the inaugural running of the Eclipse Stakes at Sandown Park, which, with a first prize of £10,000, was the most valuable race ever run in Britain. The race was run over ten furlongs at weight-for-age, although the winners of certain major races, including the Oaks, had to carry a seven pound penalty. She started a 40/1 outsider and finished sixth of the twelve runners behind the six-year-old Bendigo. Miss Jummy was sent to Goodwood in late July and ran twice: after running second to the Duke of Westminster's colt Whitefriar in the Gratwicke Stakes she won the ten furlong Nassau Stakes from three opponents at odds of 11/4, beating Argo Navis into second place for the fourth time.

==== Autumn ====
On 16 September, Miss Jummy started the 6/4 favourite for the Park Hill Stakes over the St Leger course and distance in which she was set to concede six pounds to her principal opponents Argo Navis and the Yorkshire Oaks winner Philosophy. Miss Jummy tracked the leaders before taking the lead approaching the final furlong. She was immediately challenged by Argo Navis and the two fillies raced together throughout the final furlong with Miss Jummy prevailing by a neck over her old rival. The winning time of 3:20.5 was almost a second faster than that recorded by Ormonde, carrying five pounds less, in the St Leger two days earlier.

== Stud career ==
Miss Jummy was retired to stud, but had little success as a broodmare. Miss Jummy produced two filly foals– Miss Jumbo by Mask and Nobody's Child by Trappist– before her death at age six in 1889.

== Pedigree ==
Pedigree of Miss Jummy (GB), bay mare, 1883
Sire Petrarch (FR) 1873	Lord Clifden; 1860	Newminster	Touchstone
Sire Petrarch (FR) 1873	Lord Clifden; 1860	Newminster	Beeswing
Sire Petrarch (FR) 1873	Lord Clifden; 1860	The Slave	Melbourne
Sire Petrarch (FR) 1873	Lord Clifden; 1860	The Slave	Volley
Sire Petrarch (FR) 1873	Laura; 1860	Orlando	Touchstone
Sire Petrarch (FR) 1873	Laura; 1860	Orlando	Vulture
Sire Petrarch (FR) 1873	Laura; 1860	Torment	Alarm
Sire Petrarch (FR) 1873	Laura; 1860	Torment	Glencoe mare
Dam Lady Portland (GB) 1871	The Primate; 1863	St Albans	Stockwell
Dam Lady Portland (GB) 1871	The Primate; 1863	St Albans	Bribery
Dam Lady Portland (GB) 1871	The Primate; 1863	Ellen Middleton	Bay Middleton
Dam Lady Portland (GB) 1871	The Primate; 1863	Ellen Middleton	Myrrha
Dam Lady Portland (GB) 1871	Lady Nateby; 1866	Van Galen	Van Tromp
Dam Lady Portland (GB) 1871	Lady Nateby; 1866	Van Galen	Little Casino
Dam Lady Portland (GB) 1871	Lady Nateby; 1866	Sweet Hawthorn	Sweetmeat
Dam Lady Portland (GB) 1871	Lady Nateby; 1866	Sweet Hawthorn	Alice Hawthorn (Family:4-k)
