= Throstle (horse) =

Thoroughbred racehorse

- Sire: Petrarch
- Grandsire: Lord Clifden
- Dam: Thistle
- Damsire: Scottish Chief
- Sex: Mare
- Foaled: 1891
- Country: United Kingdom
- Colour: Bay
- Breeder: Henry Sturt, 1st Baron Alington
- Owner: Lord Alington and Sir Frederick Johnstone, 8th Baronet
- Trainer: John Porter
- Record: 12: 4-2-1
- Earnings: £7,950

Major wins
- Coronation Stakes (1893); Nassau Stakes (1893); St Leger (1894)

Throstle (1891–1910) was a British Thoroughbred racehorse and broodmare. Born partially blind and considered a likely candidate for euthanasia as a foal she nevertheless proved herself one of the two best fillies of her generation in Britain. She showed considerable promise despite failing to win in three starts as a juvenile in 1893 and began her second season by running sixth to Amiable in the 1000 Guineas. In the summer of her second season she made rapid progress, winning the Coronation Stakes and Nassau Stakes as well as finishing fourth against very strong male opposition in the Eclipse Stakes. Poor form in training led to her starting at odds of 50/1 for the St Leger but she created a huge upset by defeating the Epsom Derby winner Ladas. She failed to win again and was retired from racing in 1895. She had little success as a dam of winners.

== Background ==
Throstle was a bay mare bred in England by Lord Alington who owned her in partnership with Sir Frederick Johnstone. She was sent into training with John Porter at Kingsclere. Throstle was born almost blind owing to a "film" over both eyes, and Lord Alington intended to have her destroyed and then tried unsuccessfully to give her away as a gift. Although her vision improved as she matured her eyesight remained impaired and she was prone to bolting as a result. Physically, she was described as a "clean-cut, hard, wiry type, just the sort to stay for ever".

She was sired by Petrarch, a horse which won the 2000 Guineas and the St Leger Stakes in 1876. At stud Petrarch was particularly successful as a sire of fillies: his other daughters included Miss Jummy and Busybody. Her dam Thistle was an influential broodmare who also produced Common and was the female-line ancestor of both Love In Idleness and Witch Elm.

== Racing career ==
=== 1893: two-year-old season ===
On 13 July at Newmarket Racecourse Throstle started at odds of 100/8 for the Chesterfield Stakes over five furlongs. Ridden by Mornington Cannon she finished second to the colt Speed, beaten a head after "a fine race". Later that summer she finished second to La Nievre in the Molecomb Stakes at Goodwood Racecourse. At Kempton Park Racecourse on 6 October Throstle finished unplaced behind Matchbox in the £5000 Great Breeders' Produce Stakes over one mile. Matchbox was also trained by Porter and had been bred by Lord Alington although he was later sold to Maurice de Hirsch.

=== 1894: three-year-old season ===
On 11 May over the Rowley Mile at Newmarket Throstle, with Cannon in the saddle, stated at odds of 100/7 in a thirteen-runner field for the 1000 Guineas. After being among the leaders for most of the way she was outpaced in the closing stages and finished sixth behind Amiable, who won from Lady Minting and Mecca.

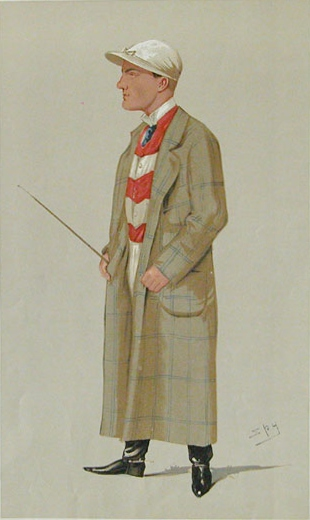
Throstle's regular jockey, Morny Cannon: caricature by Leslie Ward.

Throstle bypassed the Oaks Stakes, which was won by Amiable, and reappeared in the Coronation Stakes at Royal Ascot on 20 June. Carrying a weight of 116 pounds she started at odd of 10/1 in a field which included Amiable (assigned 136 pounds), Glare (Brocklesby Stakes) and Jocasta (runner-up in the Middle Park Plate and Dewhurst Plate). After being restrained by Cannon in the early stages, Throstle moved into contention in the straight and got the better of a struggle with Royal Victoria to win by a head. At Sandown Park on 20 July she was matched against top-class weight-for-age competition in the ten furlong Eclipse Stakes and finished fourth behind Isinglass, Ladas and Ravensbury. Two weeks later she won the Nassau Stakes at Goodwood at odds of 6/1 and was described after the race as "probably the most improved three-year-old in training".

On 12 September Throstle was stepped up in distance to contest the 119th running of the St Leger over 14 1/2 furlongs at Doncaster Racecourse and started a 50/1 outsider. It was believed in some quarters that Throstle had been entered in the race purely to make the pace for her stablemate Matchbox who had finished second in the 2000 Guineas, Derby and Grand Prix de Paris. She was in fact intended to run on her own merit but in two private trial gallops against Matchbox the filly had been badly beaten in the first and then bolted in the second, leading her connections to believe that she had no real chance in the race. On the day she looked "rough" and "sulky" and was led to the start separately from her predominantly male opponents. The odds-on favourite was the colt Ladas who had won both the 2000 Guineas and the Derby Stakes and was therefore attempting to complete the Triple Crown while only others of the eight-runner field to start at less than 20/1 were Amiable and Matchbox. Throstle started well and then settled behind the leaders as Matchbox and Legal Tender set the pace before Ladas went to the front in the straight. Throstle, however, was making steady progress on the outside, moved into second place approaching the final furlong and wore down the favourite in the closing stages to win by three quarters of a length. Her victory, which gave Mornington Cannon his first classic win, was received with loud cheering from the bookmakers and "indescribable astonishment" by the rest of the crowd.

Throstle made her next appearance in the ten furlong Jockey Club Stakes at Newmarket on 28 September. She started second favourite but lost any chance by bolting twice and taking "a tour of the country" before coming home last of the seven runners behind Isinglass. The filly made her penultimate start in the Duke of York Stakes, a handicap over one mile at Kempton on 6 October in which she carried 121 pounds and finished fourth behind St Florian. Throstle ended her racing career in the Selection Stakes at Sandown thirteen days later when she finished last of the three runners, beaten half a length and a neck by the four-year-old Best Man and Avington.

Throstle won one other minor race in 1894 and ended the season with earnings of £7,950.

== Breeding record ==
Throstle was kept in training in 1895 with the Ascot Gold Cup as her objective, but the hard ground hindered her training and she missed the race. Later that year she was bought by the 1st Duke of Westminster and retired to become a broodmare.

She produced at least six foals between 1897 and 1909:

- Missel Thrush, a brown colt, foaled in 1897, sired by Orme
- Greybird, grey colt, 1898, by Grey Leg
- Ouzel, bay filly, 1899, by Orme
- Songcraft, chestnut colt, 1900, by Orme. Winner.
- Chaudron, bay filly, 1904, by Martagon
- Matiyela, chestnut colt, 1907, by Chaleureux
- Anthem, chestnut colt (later gelded), 1909, sired by Lord Bobs

Throstle died in 1910.

== Pedigree ==
Pedigree of Throstle (GB), bay mare, 1891
Sire Petrarch (GB) 1873	Lord Clifden; 1860	Newminster	Touchstone
Sire Petrarch (GB) 1873	Lord Clifden; 1860	Newminster	Beeswing
Sire Petrarch (GB) 1873	Lord Clifden; 1860	The Slave	Melbourne
Sire Petrarch (GB) 1873	Lord Clifden; 1860	The Slave	Volley
Sire Petrarch (GB) 1873	Laura; 1860	Orlando	Touchstone
Sire Petrarch (GB) 1873	Laura; 1860	Orlando	Vulture
Sire Petrarch (GB) 1873	Laura; 1860	Torment	Alarm
Sire Petrarch (GB) 1873	Laura; 1860	Torment	Glencoe mare
Dam Thistle (GB) 1875	Scottish Chief; 1861	Lord of the Isles	Touchstone
Dam Thistle (GB) 1875	Scottish Chief; 1861	Lord of the Isles	Fair Helen
Dam Thistle (GB) 1875	Scottish Chief; 1861	Miss Ann	The Little Known
Dam Thistle (GB) 1875	Scottish Chief; 1861	Miss Ann	Bay Missy
Dam Thistle (GB) 1875	The Flower Safety; 1860	Wild Dayrell	Ion
Dam Thistle (GB) 1875	The Flower Safety; 1860	Wild Dayrell	Ellen Middleton
Dam Thistle (GB) 1875	The Flower Safety; 1860	Nettle	Sweetmeat
Dam Thistle (GB) 1875	The Flower Safety; 1860	Nettle	Miss Nancy (Family: 4-c)

- Throstle was inbred 4 × 4 × 4 to Touchstone, meaning that this stallion appears three times in the fourth generation of her pedigree.
