= Petrarch (horse) =

British-bred Thoroughbred racehorse

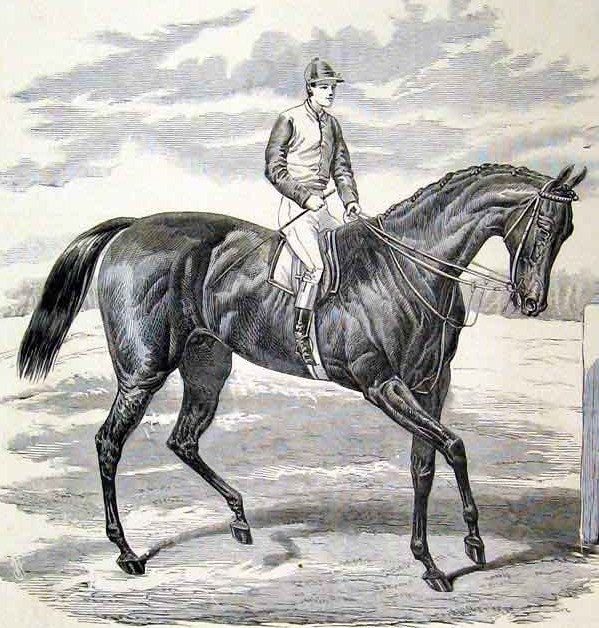
- Petrarch, from the Illustrated London News, September 1876
- Sire: Lord Clifden
- Grandsire: Newminster
- Dam: Laura
- Damsire: Orlando
- Sex: Stallion
- Foaled: 1873
- Country: United Kingdom
- Colour: Bay
- Breeder: Mr. John Gosden
- Owner: Mr. Spencer; Lord Dupplin; Lord Lonsdale; Lord Calthorpe
- Trainer: John Dawson; Joseph Cannon
- Record: 16:8-1-1

Major wins
- Middle Park Plate (1875); 2000 Guineas (1876); Prince of Wales's Stakes (1876); St. Leger Stakes (1876); Ascot Gold Cup (1877); Rous Memorial Stakes (1878)

Awards
- Leading British money winner (1876)

Petrarch (foaled 1873) was a British Thoroughbred racehorse and sire who won two British Classic Races in 1876. In a career that lasted from October 1875 to October 1878 he ran sixteen times and won eight races. In 1875, Petrarch won the Middle Park Stakes on his only appearance of the season. As a three-year-old in 1876 he won two of the three races which comprise the Triple Crown, taking the 2000 Guineas at Newmarket and the St Leger at Doncaster. He finished unplaced when favourite for The Derby. As a four-year-old he won three races including the two and a half mile Ascot Gold Cup which at that time was regarded as the most important weight-for-age race in the world. Petrarch was regarded by contemporary experts as a brilliant, but inconsistent performer. After winning once as a five-year-old in 1878 he was retired to stud where he became a successful sire of winners.

== Background ==
Petrarch was an exceptionally good-looking bay horse bred by J.Gosden at Midhurst in West Sussex. He was sired by the 1863 St Leger winner Lord Clifden, whose other progeny included the classic winners Jannette, Wenlock and Hawthornden as well as the leading sire Hampton. Petrarch's performances as a three-year-old enabled Lord Clifden to win his only sires' championship in 1876. Petrarch's dam Laura was a successful broodmare whose other foals included the Doncaster Cup winner Fraulein and the Craven Stakes winner Laureate.

As a three-year-old, Petrarch stood 15.3 hands high and despite slightly faulty hocks, was described as "the very beau ideal of a superior racehorse" The colt was originally sent into training with John Dawson, the younger brother of Mathew Dawson, at Warren House stables at Newmarket, Suffolk. Dawson was best known as the private trainer of Prince Batthyany, for whom he trained the 1875 Epsom Derby winner Galopin. Petrarch was a difficult horse to bring to peak condition, as he suffered throughout his racing career from intermittent kidney trouble.

== Racing career ==
=== 1875: two-year-old season ===
Petrarch made his racing debut in October 1875 in the Middle Park Plate over six furlongs at Newmarket. The race was the most prestigious two-year-old race of the season in Britain and attracted a field of thirty runners. With first prize money of £3,404, the race was the most valuable of the season outside the classics. Ridden by Jem Goater, Petrarch won very easily by four lengths at odds of 100/8 from Madeira and Heurtebise. The unplaced horses included the 6/4 favourite Lollypop and an unnamed "Mineral colt", who won the Dewhurst Stakes later that month. Petrarch's victory established him as one of the best colts of his generation and a leading contender for the following year's classic races.

=== 1876: three-year-old season ===
==== Spring ====
Before the start of the 1876 flat season, Petrarch was bought for 10,000 guineas (£10,500) by Lord Dupplin. Early in the year, Petrarch was favourite in the betting lists for both the 2000 Guineas and the Derby. In April however, he took part in a public trial race in which he was beaten by Lord Dupplin's other classic entry Kaleidoscope. Although Dawson had warned the owner that Petrarch was not fully fit, the trial convinced Dupplin that Kaleidoscope was the better horse and he wagered accordingly. As a result, Kaleidoscope was made favourite for the 2000 Guineas, with Petrarch starting a 20/1 outsider in a field of fourteen runners. Ridden by the little-known lightweight jockey Harry Luke, Petrarch moved alongside the early leader Camembert three furlongs from the finish and then accelerated clear of the field. He won "in a canter" by three lengths from Julius Caesar, with Kaleidoscope third. Contemporary reports described his victory as one of the easiest ever seen in the race. The crowd's response to the upset was muted, and the bookmakers were almost equally subdued, as some had taken bets at odds of up to 40/1 on the winner. At least one commentator stated that Petrarch's poor performance in the earlier trial had been a deliberate ploy by Dupplin and his confederates to obtain better odds against the colt.

==== Summer ====
At Epsom on 31 May, Petrarch started 2/1 favourite for the Derby, with the Mineral colt, now named Kisber being the second choice in the betting. Petrarch took the lead in the straight, but when Kisber emerged to challenge him a furlong from the finish he quickly faded from contention and finished fourth of the fifteen runners. It was later suggested that Petrarch's connections had never intended to win the race, and that his poor performance had been deliberately engineered as part of a betting strategy.

In June Petrarch was sent to Royal Ascot where he won the thirteen furlong Prince of Wales's Stakes from Julius Caesar. He failed to reproduce his form in two other races at the meeting, finishing fourth to Coltness in the Biennial Stakes and last of the three runners behind Morning Star in the second leg of the Triennial Stakes. One of the leading gamblers of the day, Lord Dudley, created a controversy when he refused to pay the £9,000 he had lost by wagering on Petrarch in his Ascot defeats, claiming that the horse had not been allowed to run on its merits.

==== Autumn ====
At Doncaster in September, the Derby winner Kisber started 7/4 favourite for the St Leger, with Petrarch, ridden my Jem Goater on 9/1. Petrarch was not among the early leaders as Kisber set a strong pace. Approaching the turn into the straight, Petrarch moved up to join the favourite, with the 100/1 outsider Wild Tommy also making good progress. With Kisber quickly dropping back in the straight, the race became a struggle between Petrarch and Wild Tommy and Goater made vigorous use of his whip and spurs as Petrarch stayed on gamely to win by a neck after a "fine race". As at Epsom and Ascot, there were rumours that the race had not been entirely fair: it was reported that Petrarch had been heavily backed to win by Kisber's owners, the Baltazzi brothers, who therefore stood to profit from the poor running of their own horse. According to press reports, bookmakers paid out £80,000 on winning bets on the race.

Petrarch earned prize money of £11,700 in 1876, making him the most financially successful horse of the year in Britain.

=== 1877: four-year-old season ===
Before the start of the 1877 flat season, Petrarch was offered for sale by Dupplin. He was bought by Lord Lonsdale and was moved across Newmarket to the Bedford Lodge stable of Joseph Cannon. On his first appearance of the year he carried the second highest weight of 125 pounds in the Lincolnshire Handicap on 21 March. Ridden by the champion jockey Fred Archer, he started at odds of 9/1 and finished eleventh of the thirty-three runners behind the filly Footstep. He was then allowed to walk over in a race at Newmarket before winning the High Level Handicap at Epsom.

In June at Royal Ascot, Petrarch started even money favourite for the Ascot Gold Cup in a field of seven runners, with his main opposition expected to come from Lord Falmouth's colt Skylark who had won the Gold Vase two days earlier. Ridden by Tom Cannon, his trainer's older brother, Petrarch traveled well until the turn into the straight when he seemed inclined to stop running. Only after Cannon used his whip to deliver two or three heavy strokes did the favourite consent to continue. He won by a length from Skylark, with the mare Coomassie in third place. In his next race, Petrarch started 6/5 favourite for the Liverpool Summer Cup, a handicap in which he carried top weight of 129 pounds. He took the lead in the last quarter mile but tired towards the end of the race and was caught in the last strides by Lord Rosebery's Snail, who was carrying 19 pounds less. He then ran poorly when fourth of the five runners behind Hampton in the Goodwood Cup.

A match race between Petrarch and the Oaks winner Placida was scheduled to take place over six furlongs at Newmarket in autumn, but never materialised. The colt ended the season with earnings of £2,170.

=== 1878: five-year-old season ===
On his first run as a five-year-old, Petrarch started 11/2 favourite the City and Suburban Handicap at Epsom Downs Racecourse, but finished unplaced behind the future Derby winner Sefton. He then ran at Royal Ascot for the third successive year when he contested the Rous Memorial Stakes over one mile. Ridden by Archer, he started 5/4 favourite against five opponents and won by a neck after overtaking the front-running Dalham in the closing stages. The horse was then off the course for four months before his final race in at Newmarket in October. By this time, Lonsdale, finding himself in financial difficulties, had sold the horse for £3,000 to Lord Calthorpe. Racing over ten furlongs he was unplaced behind the filly Jannette in the Champion Stakes.

== Stud career ==
Petrarch spent his early stud career at the Hampton Court Stud and was later moved to the Lanwades Stud. He sired three classic winning fillies: Busybody and Miss Jummy both won the 1000 Guineas and Oaks, whilst Throstle ended the Triple Crown bid of Ladas by winning the 1894 St Leger. The best of his colts was The Bard who won sixteen races as a two-year-old and went on to finish second in the 1886 Epsom Derby. In 1893, Petrarch was sold and exported to France, where he died a few years later.

== Sire line tree ==
- Petrarch
  - The Bard
    - Berenger
    - The Minstrel
    - Madcap
      - Lieutel
      - Dor
    - St Michel
    - Gouvernail
    - Launay
      - Rab Joie
    - Indian Chief
    - Longbow
    - Vidame
    - Maigstral
    - Thibet
      - Titus
    - Monsieur Amedee
    - Royal
    - Neflier
    - Saxon
    - Tibere
    - Monsieur Charvet
    - Tarquin
      - Matchless
  - Laureate
    - Northern Farmer
  - Hackler
    - Uphantes
    - Covert Hack
    - The Hake
    - Prince Of Naples
    - Flying Hackle
      - Better Still
      - Wind Flower
      - Jim May
      - The Best
      - Dick Bell
      - Royal Hackle
      - Cheery Pat
      - Stephen
      - Royal Weaver
    - Green Hackle
    - Organdale
    - St Brendan
      - Mellifont
      - Our Stephen
    - Flaxman
    - Hack Watch
    - Royal Hackle
    - Hackenshmidt
    - Jenkinstown
    - Old Fairyhouse
    - Ballyhackle
    - Cackler
    - Covertcoat
    - Uncle George
      - Hotspur
  - Lactantius
    - Allegro
    - Gay Lothair
  - Peter Flower
  - The Lombard
  - Florist
    - Zarda

== Pedigree ==
Pedigree of Petrarch (GB), bay stallion, 1873
Sire Lord Clifden (GB) 1860	Newminster; 1848	Touchstone*	Camel*
Sire Lord Clifden (GB) 1860	Newminster; 1848	Touchstone*	Banter*
Sire Lord Clifden (GB) 1860	Newminster; 1848	Beeswing	Doctor Syntax
Sire Lord Clifden (GB) 1860	Newminster; 1848	Beeswing	Ardrossan mare
Sire Lord Clifden (GB) 1860	The Slave; 1852	Melbourne	Humphrey Clinker
Sire Lord Clifden (GB) 1860	The Slave; 1852	Melbourne	Cervantes mare
Sire Lord Clifden (GB) 1860	The Slave; 1852	Volley	Voltaire
Sire Lord Clifden (GB) 1860	The Slave; 1852	Volley	Martha Lynn
Dam Laura (GB) 1860	Orlando; 1841	Touchstone*	Camel*
Dam Laura (GB) 1860	Orlando; 1841	Touchstone*	Banter*
Dam Laura (GB) 1860	Orlando; 1841	Vulture	Langar
Dam Laura (GB) 1860	Orlando; 1841	Vulture	Kite
Dam Laura (GB) 1860	Torment; 1850	Alarm	Venison
Dam Laura (GB) 1860	Torment; 1850	Alarm	Southdown
Dam Laura (GB) 1860	Torment; 1850	Glencoe mare	Glencoe
Dam Laura (GB) 1860	Torment; 1850	Glencoe mare	Alea (Family:10)

* Petrarch is inbred 3S x 3D to the stallion Touchstone, meaning that he appears third generation on the sire side of his pedigree, and third generation on the dam side of his pedigree.
