= Robert Sherwood (horseman) =

British jockey and trainer

Personal information
- Born: 1835
- Died: 8 October 1894 (aged 58–59) Newmarket, Suffolk
- Occupations: Jockey and Trainer

Horse racing career
- Sport: Horse racing

Major racing wins
- Major races (as a jockey); Epsom Derby (1855); Major races (as a trainer); Epsom Derby (1884); Epsom Oaks (1889)

Significant horses
- St. Gatien, Wild Dayrell

Robert William Sherwood (1835–1894) was a British jockey and racehorse trainer who won The Derby in both capacities (with Wild Dayrell in 1855 as a jockey, and St. Gatien in a dead heat in 1884 as a trainer).

== Riding career ==
Sherwood was born in Epsom in 1835, to trainer Ralph, who would go on to train the 1838 Derby winner Amato. He was one of six children.

Early career success came in 1853, when he won a French Oaks/Derby double on Jouvence, which was trained by his father. He then won the 1855 Derby on Wild Dayrell. The horse had been bred, owned and trained by people with no racing experience, and thus was not highly regarded. However, after being sent to professional trainer, John Rickaby, the horse began to shine, and ten days before the Derby, Sherwood rode him in a trial which he won comfortably. As word spread, the stable became subject to several attempts at sabotage and bribery, but these were staved off. In the race itself, Wild Dayrell, won easily by a length.

A photograph of the horse was taken in 1856 and is the earliest known photo of a Derby winner.

== Training career ==
In 1863, Robert, together with his brother Tom, moved to Hong Kong for several years to ride and train for the merchant Robert Jardine and others, taking the Ascot Gold Cup winner Buckstone with him.

On returning to England, he was out of racing for a while, before opening his own stable at Exeter House, Newmarket. There he trained St. Gatien, who dead-heated with Harvester in the 1884 Derby. St Gatien also won the Cesarewitch under the heaviest weight ever carried by a three-year-old. With Florence successful in the Cambridgeshire that year, Day completed the Autumn Double.

Robert also trained the 1889 Oaks winner L'Abbesse de Jouarre for Lord Randolph Churchill. Other successes included the 1887 Northumberland Plate with Exmoor, the 1890 Goodwood Cup with Philomel, and the 1891 City and Suburban Handicap and Kempton Park Jubilee with Nunthorpe.

He built a new yard, St Gatien House, in Newmarket, which is still in operation today.

== Personal life ==
Sherwood married Julie Charlotte Louise Vodoz in 1858. She gave birth to a son, Robert Louis Voduz Sherwood, at Epsom in 1860, who would also become a trainer. Julie died in 1867, and Sherwood later married a lady called Elizabeth.

He suffered an apoplectic fit at Newmarket on 8 October 1894 while supervising horses, and died at 1.30am on 12 October, leaving an estate of £13,017 to Elizabeth. She died in 1913. Robert Louis took over St Gatien Lodge.

== Major wins ==
(United Kingdom) Great Britain

- Epsom Derby - (1) - Wild Dayrell (1855)

France

- Prix de Diane - (1) - Jouvence (1853)
- Prix du Jockey-Club - (1) - Jouvence (1853)

== Bibliography ==
- Mortimer, Roger; Onslow, Richard; Willett, Peter (1978). Biographical Encyclopedia of British Flat Racing. Macdonald and Jane’s. ISBN 0-354-08536-0.
