= Busybody (horse) =

British-bred Thoroughbred racehorse

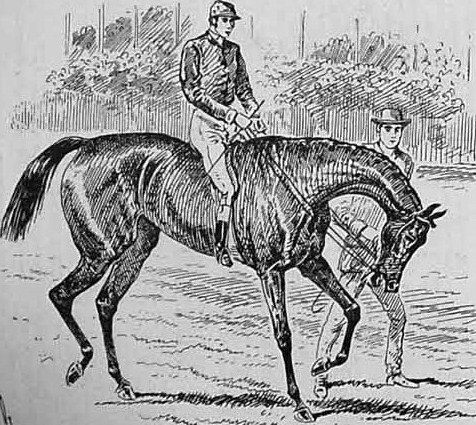
- Busybody parades before the Oaks, from Illustrated London News, May 1884
- Sire: Petrarch
- Grandsire: Lord Clifden
- Dam: Spinaway
- Damsire: Macaroni
- Sex: Mare
- Foaled: 1881
- Country: United Kingdom
- Colour: Bay
- Breeder: Evelyn Boscawen, 6th Viscount Falmouth
- Owner: Lord Falmouth; George Baird
- Trainer: Mathew Dawson; Thomas Cannon, Sr.
- Record: 6:5–1–0
- Earnings: £10,620

Major wins
- Middle Park Stakes (1883); Great Challenge Stakes (1883); 1000 Guineas (1884); Epsom Oaks (1884)

Busybody (1881–1899), was a British Thoroughbred racehorse and broodmare who won two British Classic Races in 1884. In a racing career which lasted from September 1883 until May 1884 she ran six times and won five races. As a two-year-old in 1883 she won her first three races including the Middle Park Plate and the Great Challenge Stakes before sustaining her only defeat when conceding weight to the winner Queen Adelaide in the Dewhurst Stakes. As a three-year-old she won the 1000 Guineas over one mile at Newmarket and The Oaks over one and a half miles at Epsom Downs Racecourse a month later. She was then retired to stud where she became a successful broodmare.

== Background ==
Busybody was a small, but exceptionally good-looking bay filly bred by her first owner Evelyn Boscawen, 6th Viscount Falmouth at his stud at Mereworth Castle in Kent. She was sired by Petrarch, a horse which won the 2000 Guineas and the St Leger Stakes in 1876. At stud Petrarch was particularly successful as a sire of fillies: his other daughters included Miss Jummy (1000 Guineas and Oaks) and Throstle (St Leger). Busybody came from an exceptional female family: her dam, Spinaway won the 1000 Guineas and Oaks for Lord Falmouth in 1875 and was a half sister of Wheel of Fortune, an even better racemare who won the same two races four years later. Spinaway and Wheel of Fortune were daughters of the Oaks winner Queen Bertha an influential broodmare, whose other descendants include the classic winners Larkspur, My Babu, Altesse Royale and Festoon.

Lord Falmouth sent the filly into training with Mathew Dawson at his Heath House stable in Newmarket, Suffolk.

== Racing career ==
=== 1883: two-year-old season ===
Busybody first appeared at the misleadingly named "first October meeting", held at Newmarket at the end of September. In the five furlong Rous Memorial Stakes she started the even money favourite in a field of seven runners. Ridden by the champion jockey Fred Archer, she raced just behind the leaders before taking the lead inside the final furlong and winning comfortably by a length from the colt Knight Errant.

At Newmarket's second October meeting two weeks later, Busybody, with Archer again in the saddle ran in the six furlong Middle Park Plate, the season's most valuable and prestigious race for two-year-olds. She started the 15/8 second favourite in a field of four colts and three fillies, with the Champagne Stakes winner Superba being made the even money favourite. Archer tracked the front-running Royal Fern before taking the lead close to the finish and winning by half a length. Three lengths back in third place was Sir John Willoughby's unnamed filly by Hermit out of Adelaide, who was carrying a seven pound weight penalty as a result of her win in the July Stakes. On the following afternoon, Busybody contested the weight-for-age Great Challenge Stakes over the same course and distance. She was made 7/4 favourite in a strong field which included the five-year-old Tristan and the four-year-old Despair (winner of the All-Aged Stakes). Ridden by George Fordham, Busybody produced a strong finish to win by a neck from Despair, the first two drawing well clear of Tristan in third.

At the Newmarket Houghton meeting in late October, Busybody and "the Adelaide filly" met again in the seven furlong Dewhurst Stakes. Busybody was carrying three pounds more than her rival on this occasion but started the 4/5 favourite and Lord Falmouth "declared to win" with her in preference to his other runner, the future Derby winner Harvester. As in her other races, Busybody was held up for a late run but on this occasion she was unable to catch the Adelaide filly and finished second, beaten a neck. Harvester finished last of the ten runners.

Busybody's earnings for the season totaled £3,895.

=== 1884: three-year-old season ===
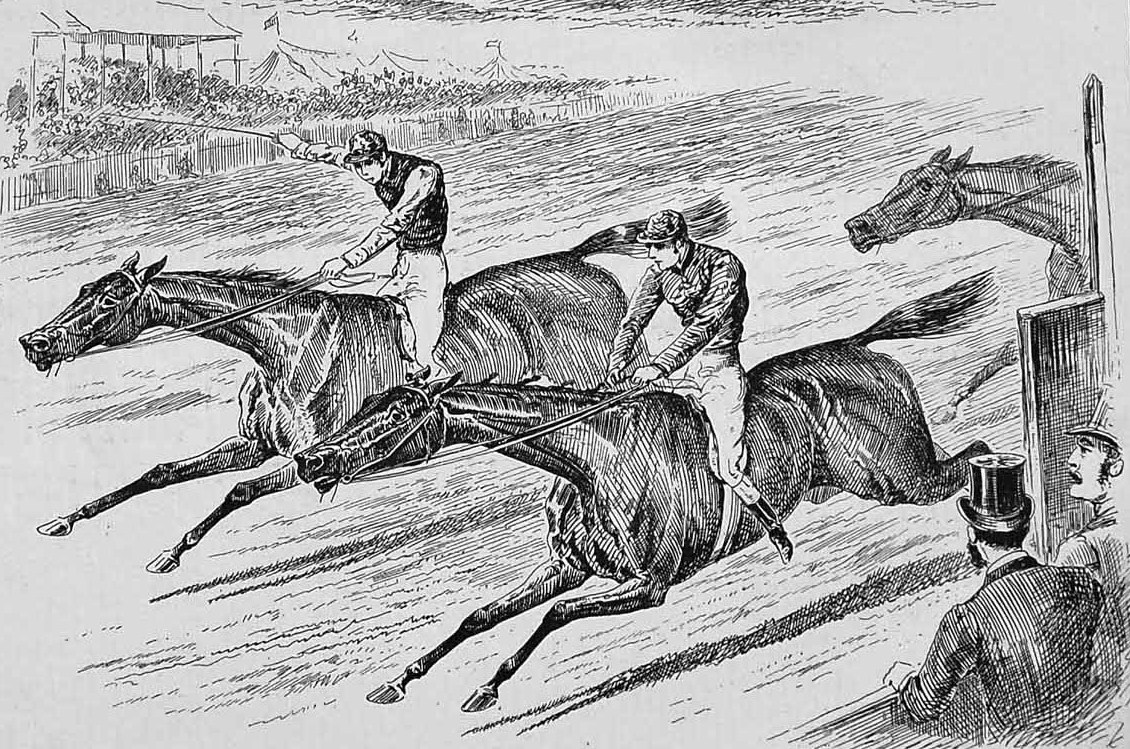
The finish of the 1884 Oaks from the Illustrated London News. Busybody beats Superba

Before the 1884 flat racing season began, Lord Falmouth decided to retire from the turf and sell all his horses at a public auction. As a leading classic fancy, Busybody was expected to attract considerable interest, and it was predicted that she would fetch at least £8,000. At Newmarket on 28 April Busybody was sold for £8,800 to Tom Cannon, acting on behalf of George Alexander Baird (also known as "Mr. Abington"). Cannon was one of the leading jockeys of the day and had been associated for many years with the Danebury trainer John Day, before taking over the stable on Day's death in 1883.

Four days after her appearance in the auction ring, Busybody returned to Newmarket for the 1,000 Guineas in which she was again matched against "the Adelaide filly", now officially named Queen Adelaide. Busybody was made favourite at odds of 85/40 in a field of six and was ridden by Tom Cannon. The early pace was slow and Busybody pulled hard against Cannon's attempts to restrain her before the race began in earnest two furlongs from the finish. Busybody and Queen Adelaide quickly went to the front, and after "a pretty race", the favourite prevailed by half a length, with Whitelock finishing third ahead of Sandiway, a filly who went on to win the Coronation Stakes and the Nassau Stakes. Busybody's winning time of 1:47.0 broke the existing race record by three seconds. Sources differ as to whether Dawson or Cannon trained the filly for her Guineas win, but Cannon took over her training from then on.

On 28 May, Queen Adelaide started 5/2 favourite for the Derby and finished a close third to the dead-heaters Harvester and St. Gatien despite having been blocked at a crucial stage. Two days later Busybody and Queen Adelaide met for the fourth and final time in the Oaks over the same course and distance with Busybody starting favourite at the unusual odds of 100/105 in a field of nine. The race took place in fine weather and attracted a "large and fashionable" crowd. After several false starts caused by the misbehaviour of Whitelock, the race began and Tom Cannon tracked the leaders on the favourite before taking the lead on the turn in to the straight. Queen Adelaide emerged as a threat, but Busybody, racing down the centre of the course, drew ahead and opened up a clear lead approaching the final furlong. Superba made a strong late challenge but Busybody held on in an exciting finish to win by half a length, the pair finishing well clear of Queen Adelaide in third.

Following her second classic win, Busybody was regarded as a contender for the St Leger, but she never raced again and at the end of the season she was retired to stud.

== Stud career ==
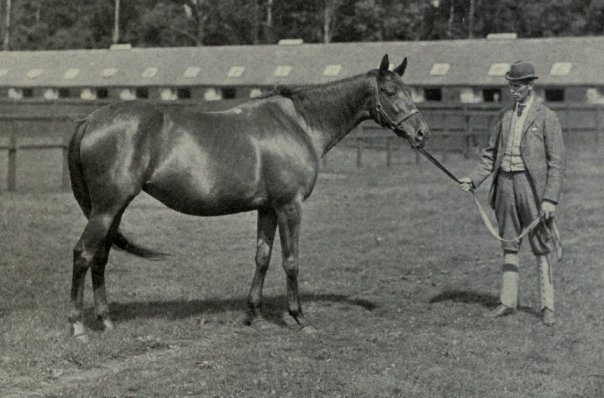
Busybody during her retirement, c. 1890

The best of Busybody's progeny was Meddler (sired by St. Gatien), who was a leading two-year-old in Britain where his wins included the Dewhurst Stakes. He was exported to the United States where he was twice Leading sire in North America. Busybody's daughters Bass and Meddlesome became successful broodmares. Busybody was euthanised in 1899 after being infertile for three years.

== Pedigree ==
Pedigree of Busybody (GB), bay mare, 1881
Sire Petrarch (GB) 1873	Lord Clifden; 1860	Newminster	Touchstone
Sire Petrarch (GB) 1873	Lord Clifden; 1860	Newminster	Beeswing
Sire Petrarch (GB) 1873	Lord Clifden; 1860	The Slave	Melbourne
Sire Petrarch (GB) 1873	Lord Clifden; 1860	The Slave	Volley
Sire Petrarch (GB) 1873	Laura; 1860	Orlando	Touchstone
Sire Petrarch (GB) 1873	Laura; 1860	Orlando	Vulture
Sire Petrarch (GB) 1873	Laura; 1860	Torment	Alarm
Sire Petrarch (GB) 1873	Laura; 1860	Torment	Glencoe mare
Dam Spinaway (GB) 1872	Macaroni; 1860	Sweetmeat	Gladiator
Dam Spinaway (GB) 1872	Macaroni; 1860	Sweetmeat	Lollypop
Dam Spinaway (GB) 1872	Macaroni; 1860	Jocose	Pantaloon
Dam Spinaway (GB) 1872	Macaroni; 1860	Jocose	Banter
Dam Spinaway (GB) 1872	Queen Bertha; 1860	Kingston	Venison
Dam Spinaway (GB) 1872	Queen Bertha; 1860	Kingston	Queen Anne
Dam Spinaway (GB) 1872	Queen Bertha; 1860	Flax	Surplice
Dam Spinaway (GB) 1872	Queen Bertha; 1860	Flax	Odessa (Family:1-w)
