= St. Gatien =

British-bred Thoroughbred racehorse

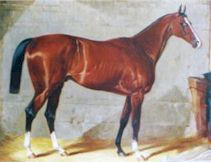
- Painting of St. Gatien. Unknown artist.
- Sire: The Rover or Rotherhill
- Dam: St Editha
- Damsire: Kingley Vale
- Sex: Stallion
- Foaled: 1881
- Country: United Kingdom of Great Britain and Ireland
- Colour: Bay
- Breeder: Francis Brace
- Owner: E. Brace; Jack Hammond
- Trainer: Robert Sherwood; James Waugh
- Record: 19: 16-0-1
- Earnings: £

Major wins
- Epsom Derby (1884); Ascot Gold Vase (1884); Cesarewitch Handicap (1884); Jockey Club Cup (1884, 1885, 1886); Ascot Gold Cup (1885); Rous Memorial Stakes (1886)

St. Gatien (1881–after 1906) was a British Thoroughbred racehorse and sire. In 1884 he was involved in the second and final dead heat in the history of The Derby, part of an unbeaten sequence of twelve races. St. Gatien went on to become a dominant performer in long-distance races, winning the Gold Cup and the Alexandra Plate at Royal Ascot, the Cesarewitch Handicap carrying a record weight, and three successive running of the Jockey Club Cup.

In a racing career which lasted from 1883 until October 1886 he ran nineteen times, won sixteen races and was never beaten at level weights. He was regarded by contemporary experts as one of the greatest horses of the 19th century. At the end of the 1886 season he was retired to stud where he had success in England, Germany and the United States.

== Background ==
St. Gatien, bred by Major Francis Brace of Catisfield Hampshire was a "grand, lengthy" bay horse with a white blaze and three white socks. Brace made several unsuccessful attempts to sell the colt for as little as £100, before putting him into training with Robert Sherwood at his Exeter House stable at Newmarket, Suffolk. Sherwood agreed to train the horse at a reduced rate of thirty shillings a week instead of the usual fifty as he had very few horses in his stable at the time. At the end of 1883, Brace succeeded in selling St. Gatien for £1,400 to Jack Hammond, a former stable-boy who had made his fortune as a professional gambler. In 1885, St. Gatien was moved to the stable of James Waugh.

St. Gatien's pedigree was obscure and controversial as his dam, a former carriage-horse called Saint Editha, may have been covered by two stallions in the year of his conception. She was originally sent to a stallion named Rotherhill at Worcester Park, but when the covering appeared to have been unsuccessful, she was covered by The Rover, a "stilty-legged, broken down" horse, who happened to be at the same farm. Most contemporary commentators believed that St. Gatien's sire was The Rover, but it is possible that he was sired by Rotherhill. Neither stallion got any other horses of notable racing merit. The success of St. Gatien provoked interest in The Rover, who was found to have been sold for £50 and was standing in Ireland at a fee of three guineas. On 19 November 1884 The Rover was killed when his throat was cut in his stable at Listowel. His death was the subject of a court case the following year in which his bankrupt owner was accused of the "malicious destruction" of the stallion to prevent him falling into the hands of his creditors.

St. Gatien was ridden in most of his races by Charles Wood, who won the Championship in 1887. Wood was a controversial figure who was later "warned off" (banned from racing) for almost nine years for his involvement in illegal betting and suspected race-fixing.

== Racing career ==
=== 1883: two-year-old season ===
St. Gatien was unbeaten in three minor races as a two-year-old. His wins were in the Teddington Plate at Kempton, the John O’Gaunt Plate at Manchester Racecourse and the Little John Plate at Nottingham. The combined value of the three was less than £500.

=== 1884: three-year-old season ===
==== Epsom Derby ====
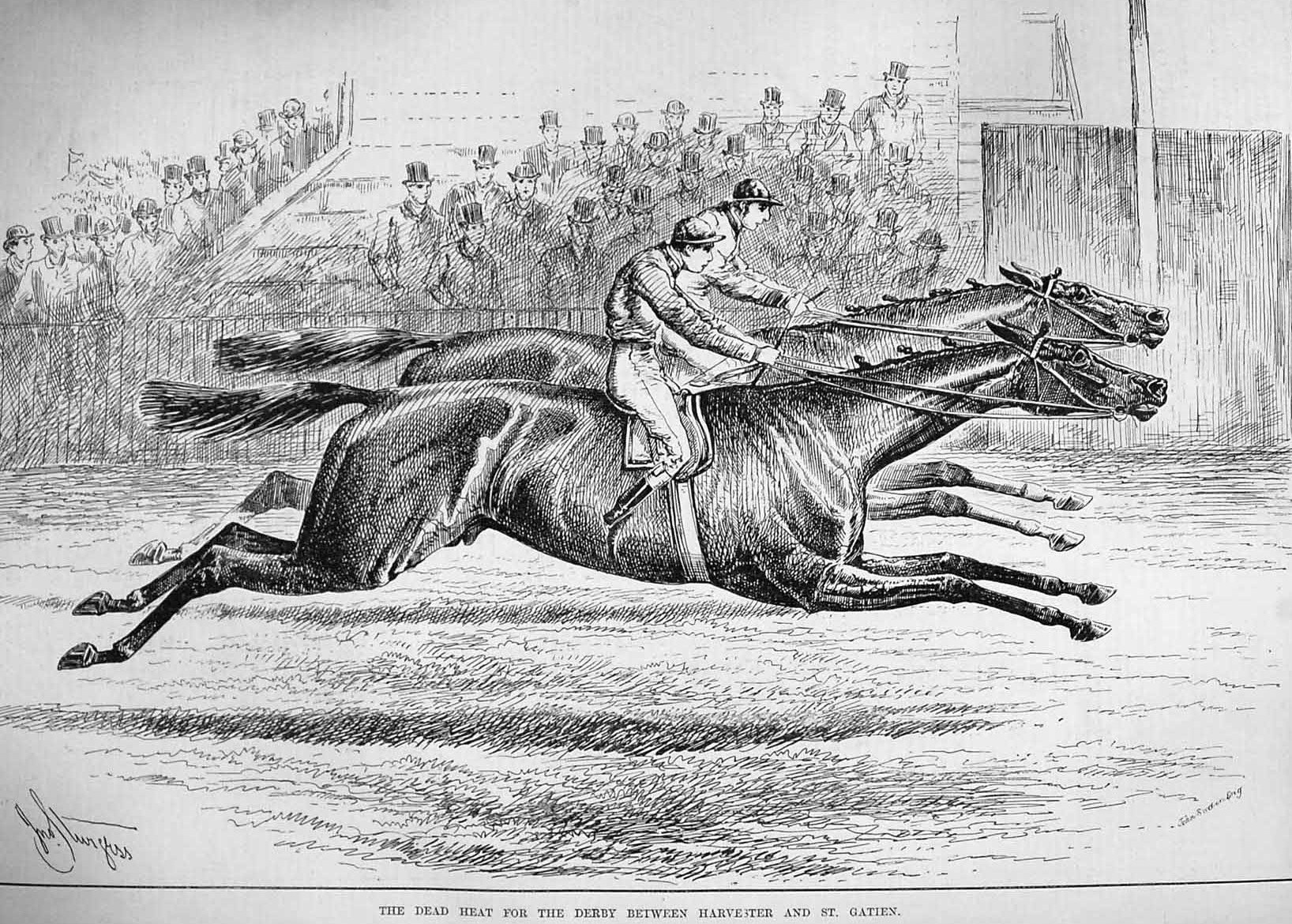
The finish of the 1884 Derby from the Illustrated London News. St. Gatien is on the far side

In April, St. Gatien made his first appearance in the betting lists for The Derby, being backed at odds of 40/1. A correspondent for Bell's Life had little to say in his favour at this time, pointing out that the races he had won had been very poorly contested. The Sportsman noted that he was supposedly a difficult horse to ride, but admitted that his connections (his owner and trainer and their associates) were among the "shrewdest people on the turf" and would be unlikely to waste their money backing a horse with no chance.

St. Gatien, who had not been entered for the 2000 Guineas, made his three-year-old debut in The Derby. The customary huge crowd was in attendance, despite the "cold and cheerless" weather. St. Gatien was not a popular choice with the public but was reportedly backed by the "sharps" (those with inside knowledge) and started at odds of 100/8 in a field of fifteen runners, the filly Queen Adelaide going off the 5/2 favourite. St. Gatien was one of the early leaders before being settled by his jockey, Charles Wood. At Tattenham corner, St. Gatien moved into contention again on the outside as the field was led by Borneo and Richmond. Shortly after the turn into the straight Wood sent St. Gatien into the lead, closely followed by Sam Loates on Harvester. The two colts pulled clear of their opponents and a "tremendous struggle" ensued as they raced "locked together" throughout the closing stages. Well inside the final furlong St. Gatien took a half length advantage but Harvester produced a final effort and the two leaders crossed the line together. Queen Adelaide finished strongly to take third after being blocked at a crucial stage. The judge was unable to separate St. Gatien and Harvester and after a brief delay a dead heat was called. The common practice at the time was for dead heats to be settled by the two horses immediately running again over the same course, although the prize could be shared if both owners agreed. Hammond, who stood to take £30,000 in winning bets, offered to divide the stakes and Harvester's owners accepted,

Shortly after the race a protest was lodged against St. Gatien on the grounds of "insufficient entry"- apparently a reference to his uncertain paternity- but this was quickly withdrawn.

==== After Epsom ====
On his first start after the Derby, St. Gatien was sent to Royal Ascot for the Gold Vase, in which he faced the top class older horses Corrie Roy (who started favourite) and Tristan at weight-for-age over two miles. Corrie Roy made the running until the straight, when Wood moved St. Gatien up to challenge. The Derby winner quickly took control of the race and pulled away to win easily by four lengths from Corrie Roy, with Tristan a remote third. Later at the same meeting Corrie Roy won the Alexandra Plate, while Tristan beat Harvester in the Hardwicke Stakes.

St. Gatien, who had not been entered in the St. Leger, did not reappear until October 7 when he ran in the Cesarewitch Stakes at Newmarket. In the two and a quarter mile handicap he was assigned a weight of 122 pounds, meaning that he carried more weight than any of the other runners except for the six-year-old Corrie Roy and the four-year-old Florence, the winner of the Grosser Preis von Baden. No three-year-old had ever won the race with such a weight, the previous record being 118 carried by Robert the Devil in 1880. St. Gatien, who looked "magnificent" before the race, was restrained by Wood towards the back of the twenty runner field before being moved into contention two furlongs out. He was unable to obtain a clear run and had to be switched to the outside as the lead was disputed by Polemic and the French-trained Archiduc. Once in the clear, St. Gatien's acceleration decided the race in a "very few strides" and he drew clear with "ridiculous ease" to win impressively by four lengths from Polemic (carrying 85 pounds) and Archiduc (117). His win was described by one correspondent as "the greatest that has ever been accomplished within in the memory of racing men," while others took the race as evidence for a radical reformation of the weight-for-age scale. Jack Hammond reportedly took £40,000 in winning bets on this occasion.

Although St. Gatien was entered in the Cambridgeshire Handicap at the next Newmarket meeting, he would have been required to carry 139 pounds, and his connections decided not to run, instead targeting the ten furlong Free Handicap at the same meeting on October 22. He started odds-on favourite and successfully conceded three pounds to Duke of Richmond, winning comfortably by three quarters of a length. On his final start of the year he won at Newmarket for the third time when taking the Jockey Club Cup.

Hopes for a meeting between St. Gatien and the other outstanding horse of his generation St. Simon were put in doubt when it appeared that the latter would be retired. Although St. Simon did stay in training in 1885, he was unable to run and the much-anticipated meeting of the "two Saints" never materialised.

=== 1885: four-year-old season ===
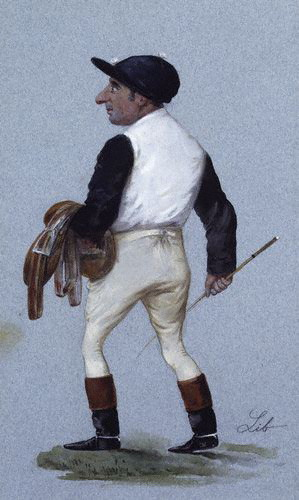
Caricature of Charles Wood, St. Gatien's regular jockey

Before the start of the 1885 season, Hammond announced that although St. Gatien would be entered for the most important handicap races, he would be mainly aimed at the major weight-for-age staying races. In spring however, all of Hammond's plans were placed in jeopardy when St. Gatien fell seriously ill with what was described as "pleuro-pneumonia", putting his future as a racehorse in considerable doubt.

St. Gatien made a full recovery, and made his seasonal debut in the Gold Cup over two and a half miles at Royal Ascot on June 18. Much interest in the Gold Cup was created by a "sealed entry" in the race by the Duke of Portland, with hopes that it would contain the name of St. Simon. St. Simon did not appear, but St. Gatien's opponents for the race included Eole, the outstanding older horse in America in 1883, and the 1884 2000 Guineas winner Scot Free. St. Gatien, who started the 1/3 favourite was always going easily and overtook Eole a furlong out before pulling clear to win "in a canter" by three lengths. On the following day he faced Eole again in the three mile Alexandra Plate which also attracted the leading French colt Hermitage. St. Gatien raced in last place for much of the way before moving up to take the lead two furlongs out and drawing away to win by six lengths.

At about this time there was a serious disagreement between Jack Hammond and Robert Sherwood, which resulted in Hammond removing all his horses, including St. Gatien from Sherwood's stable and moving them across Newmarket to the Middleton Cottage stable of James Waugh.

In autumn Lord Hastings, the owner of the 1885 Derby winner Melton issued a challenge to Jack Hammond for a £1,000 match race between his horse and St. Gatien, with Melton to receive nine pounds. The challenge was declined, as St. Gatien had already been heavily backed for the Cambridgeshire Handicap, a race in which he had been assigned 136 pounds and Hammond did not want to disrupt the horse's preparation. St. Gatien returned to the racecourse after a break of four months in Her Majesty's Plate over two miles at Newmarket on October 12. The race proved meaningless as a contest, his only opponent being a three-year-old filly called Jane who had finished runner-up in the 1000 Guineas. St. Gatien started at odds of 1/33 and won with predictable ease by twenty lengths.

In the Cambridgeshire over nine furlongs on 27 October, St. Gatien, now undefeated in eleven races, started 2/1 favourite in a field of twenty-seven. He was prominent throughout the race but could never get on level terms with the filly Plaisanterie who won impressively by two lengths carrying 124 pounds. St. Gatien was involved in a close race for the minor places and finished fifth, just behind Bendigo, Eastern Emperor and Caltha. He had no chance with the winner, but may have been unlucky not to finish second. Two days after losing his unbeaten record, St. Gatien returned to his favoured staying distance in the Jockey Club Cup. He started at odds of 1/8 and won the race very easily, beating Lavaret by fifteen lengths.

After St. Gatien's defeat in the Cambridgeshire, Hammond responded to the earlier challenge of Lord Hastings by suggesting a level-weight match race between St. Gatien and Melton at some point in the following season for a stake of between £5,000 and £20,000.

=== 1886: five-year-old season ===
Much of the interest in the 1886 season concerned the newly inaugurated Eclipse Stakes at Sandown in July, which offered a then record prize of £10,000. From the start of the year, St. Gatien was seen as one of the leading contenders for the new race together with Bendigo and Minting. For the second year in succession, St. Gatien's spring preparation was disrupted, this time by injury, although he was able to resume his training in time for Royal Ascot. It was reported that St. Gatien had been defeated by Melton in a private trial race in early 1886, but there are few details and it is unclear whether or not this was a serious contest.

At Ascot, St. Gatien bypassed the staying events and ran instead in a Rous Memorial Stakes over one mile. He raced in third before taking the lead in the straight and in a well-contested finish, he held off the three-year-old St. Michael, to whom he was conceding twenty-four pounds, to win by a head. The Eclipse Stakes took place on July 23 over ten furlongs, at weight-for-age, with the winners of major races carrying extra weight "penalties". St. Gatien started at 9/4 in a field of twelve, with Bendigo, receiving three pounds, going off the 6/4 favourite. St. Gatien started well and was settled by Wood to race just behind the leaders. In the straight he made his challenge but could never reach the lead and finished third, beaten three lengths and half a length by Bendigo and Candlemas.

St. Gatien returned to Newmarket on October 12 to attempt to win a second Cesarewitch. On this occasion, he was assigned a weight of 131 pounds, twenty-three pounds more than any of the seventeen other runners. He made little show in the race and finished unplaced behind Stone Clink. Two days later, St. Gatien was given a chance to redeem his reputation when he met Stone Clink again in Her Majesty's Plate over two miles. This race was at level weights and St. Gatien had no difficulty justifying his position as 4/9 favourite, taking the lead a furlong from the finish and winning very easily by three lengths.

St. Gatien's last race came in the Jockey Club Cup on October 29 when he finally met Melton in an official contest. The race was effectively a match, with the only other runner starting at 100/1. St. Gatien, who started a slight favourite, gave Melton three pounds and was never in danger of defeat. After taking the lead just after half way he "polished off" Melton in the easiest fashion and won unchallenged by eight lengths to record his third successive victory in the race.

== Assessment ==
In May 1886 The Sporting Times carried out a poll of one hundred experts to create a ranking of the best British racehorses of the 19th century. St. Gatien was ranked seventh, having been placed in the top ten by thirty-six of the contributors. Lists published later in the year by Baily's Magazine and others also placed St. Gatien among the best of "modern times". At least one English writer considered him the "Horse of the Century" and believed that on the day he won his third Jockey Club Cup, he would have beaten Ormonde. In 1884, St. Gatien earned £7,342, the highest for any horse in Britain.

Mathew Dawson, who trained the winners of twenty-eight Classics said of St. Gatien and St. Simon that "two better animals never trod the turf." The "vexed question" of which of the two was the better, was never resolved on the racecourse.

== Stud career ==
St. Gatien retired to the Heath Stud at Newmarket where he stood at an initial fee of 50 guineas. He remained in England until the summer of 1890 when he was sold to the German government for £14,000 and exported to stand at Graditz. He returned to England to stand at the Cobham stud until 1898 when he was exported to the United States and sold privately to James Ben Ali Haggin. He stood at Rancho del Paso, California until its closure in 1905. St. Gatien was repurchased by Haggin for $500 at the Rancho del Paso dispersal sale in December 1905, and he was relocated to Haggin's Elmendorf Farm. He was sold to George J. Long in January 1906 and was moved to Louisville, Kentucky. The best of St. Gatien's progeny was probably Meddler (out of Busybody), who was a leading two-year-old in Britain where his wins included the Dewhurst Stakes. He was exported to the United States where he was twice Leading sire in North America.

== Pedigree ==
The following pedigree assumes that St. Gatien was sired by The Rover

Pedigree of St. Gatien (GB), bay stallion, 1881
Sire The Rover (GB) 1874	Blair Athol; 1861	Stockwell	The Baron
Sire The Rover (GB) 1874	Blair Athol; 1861	Stockwell	Pocahontas
Sire The Rover (GB) 1874	Blair Athol; 1861	Blink Bonny	Melbourne
Sire The Rover (GB) 1874	Blair Athol; 1861	Blink Bonny	Queen Mary
Sire The Rover (GB) 1874	Crinon; 1868	Newminster	Touchstone
Sire The Rover (GB) 1874	Crinon; 1868	Newminster	Beeswing
Sire The Rover (GB) 1874	Crinon; 1868	Margery Daw	Brocket
Sire The Rover (GB) 1874	Crinon; 1868	Margery Daw	Protection
Dam Saint Editha (GB) 1873	Kingley Vale; 1864	Nutbourne	The Nabob
Dam Saint Editha (GB) 1873	Kingley Vale; 1864	Nutbourne	Princess
Dam Saint Editha (GB) 1873	Kingley Vale; 1864	Bannerdale	Newminster
Dam Saint Editha (GB) 1873	Kingley Vale; 1864	Bannerdale	Florence Nightingale
Dam Saint Editha (GB) 1873	Lady Alice; 1855	Chanticleer	Birdcatcher
Dam Saint Editha (GB) 1873	Lady Alice; 1855	Chanticleer	Whim
Dam Saint Editha (GB) 1873	Lady Alice; 1855	Agnes	Clarion
Dam Saint Editha (GB) 1873	Lady Alice; 1855	Agnes	Annette (Family: 16)
