= James Waugh (racehorse trainer) =

James Waugh (13 December 1831 – 23 October 1905), was a Scottish trainer of racehorses. He trained winners of many notable races, in Britain and on the continent.

== Early life ==
Waugh was born in Jedburgh, the son of Richard Waugh, a farmer. Brought up on his father's farm, he became in 1851 private trainer of steeplechasers at Cessford Moor to a banker named Grainger. He frequently rode the horses in races. In 1855 in Jedburgh he trained horses for Sir David Baird and Sir J. Boswell, and four years later succeeded Mathew Dawson in the training establishment at Gullane.

He soon afterwards moved to East Ilsley in Berkshire, where he became private trainer to Mr Robinson, an Australian, for whom he won the Royal Hunt Cup at Ascot with Gratitude. In 1866, on Robinson's retirement from the turf, Waugh succeeded Mathew Dawson at Russley Park, near Lambourn, where he was a successful private trainer for James Merry. He saddled Marksman, who ran second to Hermit in the Epsom Derby of 1867; Belladrum, second to Pretender in the 2000 Guineas Stakes in 1869; and Macgregor, who, in 1870, won the 2000 Guineas. At the close of the season of 1870 Waugh left Russley for Kentford, near Newmarket.

== Abroad, and return to Newmarket ==
He soon afterwards moved to Poland to train for Count Henckel, at Nakło Śląskie and from 1872 for seven years at Karlburg in Hungary; there he trained winners of every big race in Austria-Hungary. In some of the events successes were scored several times. His horses also won many important prizes in Germany.

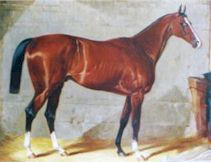
St Gatien, 1884 Derby winner trained by Waugh

Returning to Newmarket in 1880, he settled first at Middleton Cottage and then at Meynell House for the rest of his life. Several continental owners sent horses to be trained by him, among them Prince Tasziló Festetics, for whom he won the Grosser Preis von Baden, the Deutsches Derby, and other important races. From 1885 to 1890 he took charge of Jack Hammond's horses, including St. Gatien, who in 1884 dead-heated with Harvester in the Derby, and won the Cesarewitch Handicap, carrying 8st 10lb; and Florence, winner of the Cambridgeshire Handicap in 1884. For Jack Hammond, Waugh won the Ascot Cup in 1885 with St. Gatien, the Ascot Stakes with Eurasian in 1887, and the Cambridgeshire with Laureate in 1889.

Other patrons were the Chevalier Scheibler, Count Lehndorff, Count Kinsky, A. B. Carr, Deacon, J. S. Baird-Hay, Sir R. W. Jardine, Dobell, James Russel, D. J. Jardine, and Inglis, and Miss Graham. He trained The Rush to win the Chester Cup in 1896, and the Ascot Gold Vase in 1898; Piety the Manchester Cup in 1897; and Refractor the Royal Hunt Cup at Ascot in 1899.

Waugh achieved some success as a breeder of racehorses, and when at Newmarket bought and sold thoroughbreds for continental patrons and foreign governments.

He died at Newmarket, after some years of failing health, on 23 October 1905, and was buried in the cemetery there. He married in 1854 Isabella (died 1881), daughter of William Scott of Tomshielhaugh, Southdean. Of his large family, six sons became trainers of horses.

The racing journalist Edward Moorhouse wrote: "He was an excellent judge of a horse. In all his dealings he was the soul of honour. He was noted for his geniality and hospitality."
