= Tom Cannon Sr. =

British racing jockey and trainer (1864–1917)

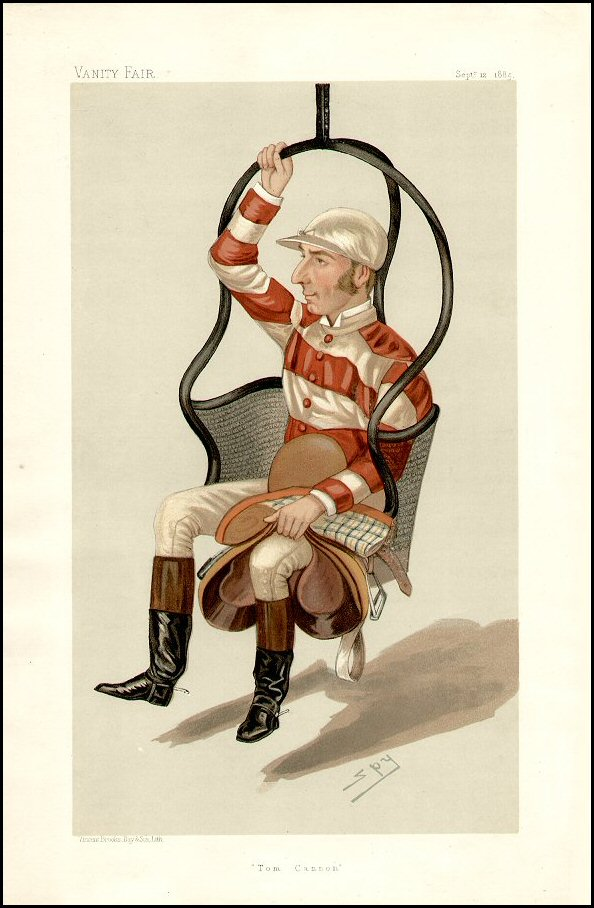
- Tom Cannon caricature in Vanity Fair, 12 September 1885

Personal information
- Born: April 1846 Windsor, England
- Died: 13 July 1917 (aged 71) Stockbridge, England
- Occupations: Jockey, Trainer
- Children: 5, including Morny

Horse racing career
- Sport: Horse racing
- Career wins: 1,544

Major racing wins
- British Classic Race wins as jockey: 1,000 Guineas (3); 2,000 Guineas (4); Epsom Oaks (4); Epsom Derby; St. Leger

Racing awards
- British flat racing Champion Jockey 1872

Significant horses
- Amphion, Busybody, Pilgrimage, Shotover

Tom Cannon Sr. (April 1846 – 13 July 1917) was a British flat racing jockey and trainer. He won 13 British classics as a jockey, becoming champion in 1872. As a trainer, he trained classic winners, as well as winners over jumps, including the 1888 Grand National. He was the father of four jockey sons, including the six-times champion, Morny Cannon and the great-grandfather of eleven-times champion, Lester Piggott.

== Early life ==
Cannon was born in Eton, Berkshire in April 1846. His parents were Thomas H. Cannon and his wife, Harriett from Windsor. Thomas H. has been described variously as a livery stable keeper, horse dealer and keeper of the George Hotel in Eton. The young Cannon was a slight boy, lightweight and graceful.

== Career ==
=== Jockey ===
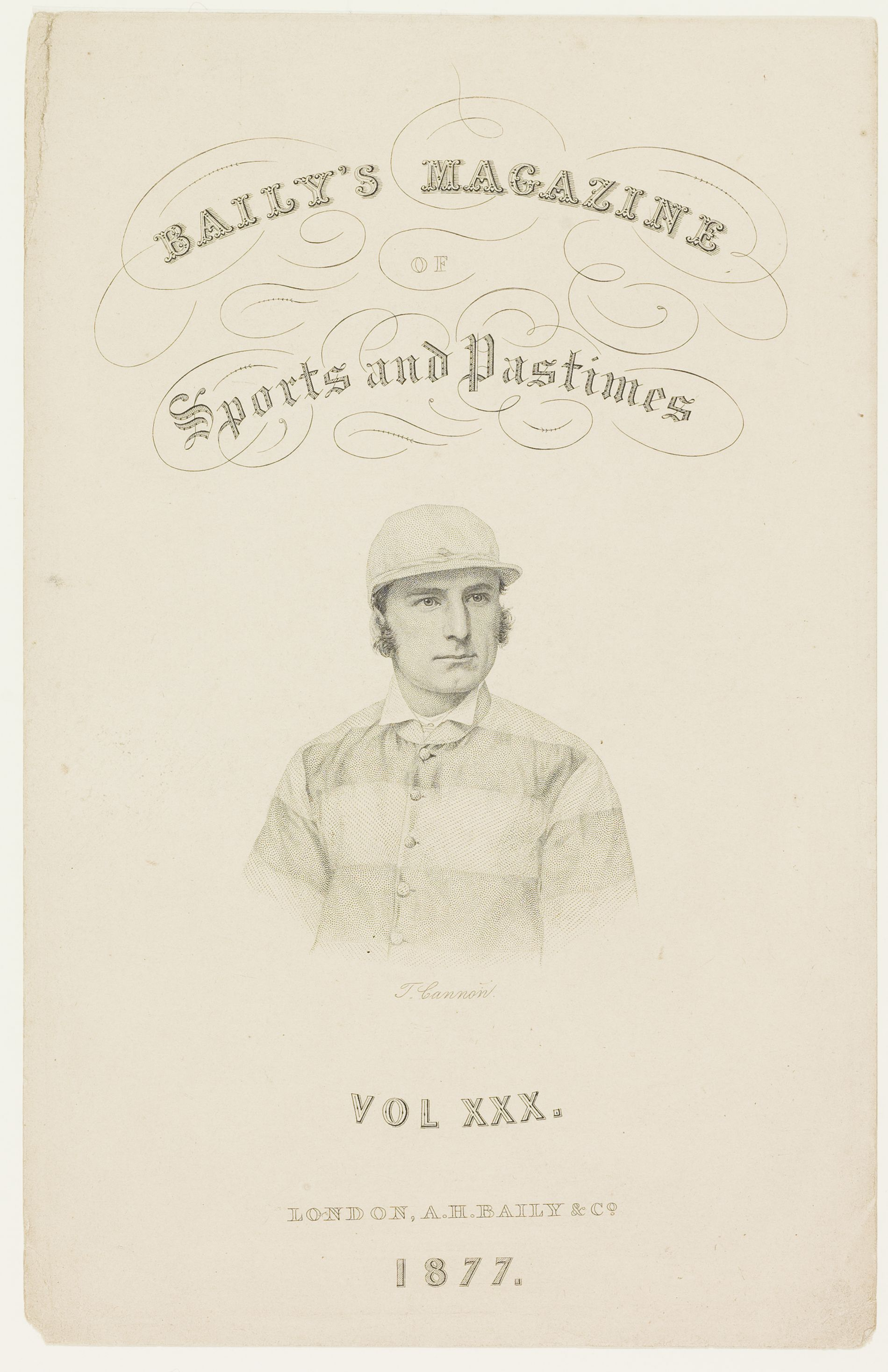
Tom Cannon (cover of Baily's Magazine, 1877)

At 13, Cannon was apprenticed to a trainer called Mr Sextie. His first race ride, aged 14, was in the Saltrom Handicap at Plymouth on Mavourneen, a four-year-old mare. That race ended in a fall, but within the week, he had had his first winner, a horse called My Uncle, owned by Lord Portsmouth in a six furlong heats race, also at Plymouth. After dead-heating in the second heat, he won the decider by a head. At this time, his race riding weight was a mere 3 st 12 lb (24.5 kg).

For most of his career, Cannon was attached to the yard of John Day Jr., at Danebury by the side of Stockbridge Racecourse in Hampshire. There he was mentored by the jockey George Fordham, who was nine years his senior. Day provided Cannon with first classic win in the 1866 1,000 Guineas aboard a filly called Repulse. He also rode for his younger brother, Joseph Cannon and was associated with the stables of John Porter and James Ryan.

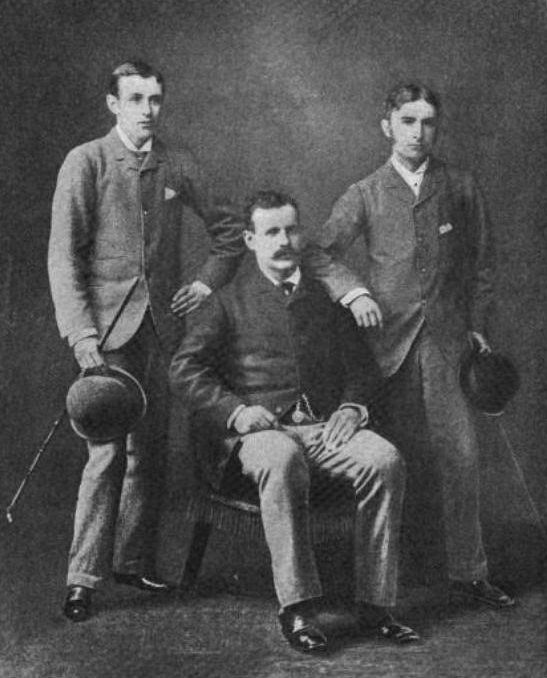
Cannon (right) with Fred Archer and Ned Hanlan

Being a contemporary of both his mentor George Fordham and Fred Archer, who between them dominated the jockeys' championship for over 30 years, Cannon's own championship ambitions were limited. Nevertheless, he took the title in 1872 with a total of 87 wins. In fact, despite the feats of Fordham and Archer, it was said of Cannon that "for 35 years he had no superior as a horseman".

In terms of classic wins, Cannon could also hold his head up amongst those rivals. Most notably, he won the 2,000 Guineas and Derby, traditionally races for colts, on the fillies Pilgrimage and Shotover respectively, further enhancing his reputation as a master handler of fillies. He also won many of the major races in France.

In 1887, after Archer's death, trainer John Porter turned to Cannon to take the ride on "horse of the century", Ormonde. Cannon thus took his part in one of racing's most memorable races, the 1887 Hardwicke Stakes at Ascot Racecourse. In what Lord Arthur Grosvenor called "the most splendid finish ever seen on a racecourse", Ormonde beat Minting by a neck with Bendigo further back.

In the twilight of his riding career, Cannon became retained jockey for Scottish millionaire, George Alexander Baird. Cannon's reputation was such that he was able to refuse the single year contract on offer and instead negotiate a three-year contract at £3,000 per season, paid upfront. The best horse he rode for Baird was Busybody, who he also trained.

In total, Cannon rode 1,544 winners in his career as a jockey.

=== Trainer ===
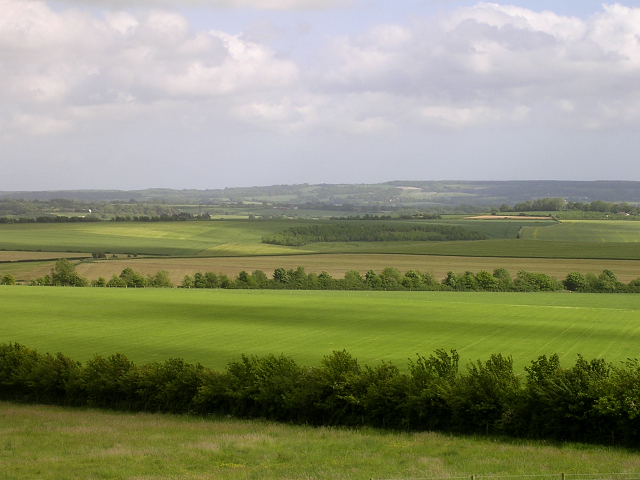
Danebury Down, Hampshire, close to where Tom Cannon trained

Cannon started dabbling in training while he was still a jockey. He worked from Day's stable, initially sharing, before taking over the running of it completely in 1879. After Day's death, he came to own the yard.

In 1884, he recorded the remarkable feat of both training and riding Busybody to a Guineas/Oaks double. Cannon was also a dual purpose trainer, and trained the 1888 Grand National winner Playfair. He never matched his Derby wins as a jockey with similar wins as a trainer, but went close with Reminder, third in 1894, and Curzon, one place better the following year. He also dabbled in selling horses like his father had, selling Cesarewitch winner Humewood to Lord Rodney.

Cannon garnered quite a reputation as a trainer of jockeys. In fact, it has been remarked that he was better at training jockeys than training horses. He tutored his sons – Tom Jr., Charles, Kempton (named after the racecourse) and Mornington (named after one of his mounts, and known as Morny) – in race-riding. Morny went on surpass even his father's achievements, winning the jockey's championship six times, whilst Kempton too won classics. Other riders to benefit from Cannon's tutelage included Sam Loates, John Watts, Jack Robinson, George Lambton and amateur rider Arthur Coventry.

He rode against two of his sons – Tom Jr. and Morny before his retirement in 1891. His last race was on 11 August at Kempton, in the Hanworth Park Maiden Plate, where he finished third on Benedetto. The race was won by his son, Morny, on Sheldrake, the 3/1 favourite. After giving up training in 1892, he passed the stables over to his son, Tom Cannon Jr.

In later life, Cannon became Clerk of the Course at Stockbridge. However, the demise of that venue, which closed when part of the land it lay on passed to a lady who disagreed with horse racing, also gave way to the end of his training career, given Danebury's proximity to the course. He then purchased the Grosvenor Hotel, Stockbridge, Hampshire, where he lived out the remaining years of his life.

The last horse that turned out in his silks was in 1913, long after he had retired from training.

== Riding style ==
Cannon has been described as "a beautiful horseman with the lightest of hands" and "imperturbable, a shrewd technician and a wonderful judge of pace." Amongst his colleagues, he was regarded as a "polished" performer, and a peerless handler of young horses and, as he demonstrated with his multiple Oaks and 1,000 Guineas victories, of fillies. In 1887, it was said of Cannon:

On a shifty two-years-old, Cannon is particularly skilful; and in judgment and patience he has no superior. He has wonderfully fine hands, and his coolness and knowledge of pace are particularly noticeable in all his finishes. Time after time, Cannon has won races when other jockeys would have left off riding

— Australian Town and Country Journal, 5 Feb 1887

Conversely, what some saw as perfect finishing, other saw as the main fault in his riding – his habit of trying to win races by a narrow margin to protect a horse's handicap mark, which, when he got it wrong, was known to cost him winners.

In contrast with some of the racing characters of the time, Cannon himself was a man of "irreproachable character" and, unlike his contemporaries, he was sparing with his use of the whip.

== Personal life and death ==
Cannon first married Catherine, known as Kate, the daughter of his trainer John Day. When Kate died in 1891, he remarried.

Besides his famous jockey sons, Cannon also had a daughter, Margaret. She married another jockey, Ernest Piggott, and became the grandmother of multiple Champion Jockey Lester Piggott.

In later life Cannon was seriously ill, suffering from dropsy and heart trouble.

Cannon died at the Grosvenor on 13 July 1917, aged 71.

== Major wins ==
(United Kingdom) Great Britain

=== Classic races ===
- 1,000 Guineas – Repulse (1866), Pilgrimage (1878), Busybody (1884)
- 2,000 Guineas – Pilgrimage (1878), Shotover (1882), Enterprise (1887), Enthusiast (1889)
- Oaks – Brigantine (1869), Marie Stuart (1873), Geheimniss (1882), Busybody (1884)
- Derby – Shotover (1882)
- St. Leger – Robert The Devil (1880)

== Statistics ==
Flat wins in Great Britain by year

- 1869 – 48
- 1870 – not known
- 1871 – not known
- 1872 – 87
- 1873 – not known
- 1874 – not known
- 1875 – not known
- 1876 – not known
- 1877 – not known
- 1878 – not known
- 1879 – not known
- 1880 – 79
- 1881 – 77
- 1882 – 58
- 1883 – 38
- 1884 – 66
- 1885 – 42
- 1886 – not known
- 1887 – not known
- 1888 – 53

== See also ==
- List of significant families in British horse racing

== Bibliography ==
- Mortimer, Roger; Onslow, Richard; Willett, Peter (1978). Biographical Encyclopaedia of British Racing. London: Macdonald and Jane's. ISBN 0-354-08536-0.
- Tanner, Michael; Cranham, Gerry (1992). Great Jockeys of the Flat. Enfield, Middlesex: Guinness Publishing. ISBN 0-85112-989-7.
- Wright, Howard (1986). The Encyclopaedia of Flat Racing. London: Robert Hale. ISBN 0-7090-2639-0.
