= Mahler (horse) =

Irish Thoroughbred racehorse

- Discipline: Racehorse
- Sire: Galileo
- Grandsire: Sadler's Wells
- Dam: Rainbow Goddess
- Sex: Male
- Country: Ireland
- Owner: Sue Magnier; Michael Tabor; Derrick Smith

Mahler (foaled April 14, 2004) is a racehorse sired by Galileo out of Rainbow Goddess. During his racing career, he was trained in Ireland by Aidan O'Brien, and he is owned by Sue Magnier, Michael Tabor and Derrick Smith.

His most notable victory was in the Group 3 Queen's Vase at Ascot Racecourse in Great Britain, although a more lucrative performance was to follow in the 2007 Melbourne Cup in Australia, where he finished third when ridden by Stephen Baster.

He now stands as a stallion at Coolmore's National Hunt breeding operation in Ireland.
