= Bendigo (horse) =

British-bred Thoroughbred racehorse

- Sire: Ben Battle
- Grandsire: Rataplan
- Dam: Hasty Girl
- Damsire: Lord Gough
- Sex: Stallion
- Foaled: 1880
- Country: Great Britain
- Colour: Brown
- Owner: H. T. Barclay
- Trainer: Charles Jousiffe
- Earnings: £20,100

Major wins
- Cambridgeshire Stakes (1883); Lincolnshire Handicap (1885); Hardwicke Stakes (1885); Eclipse Stakes (1886); Jubilee Stakes (1887); Champion Stakes (1887)
- Last updated on 6 October 2012

Bendigo (foaled 1880) was a British Thoroughbred racehorse. He was owned by H. T. Barclay and trained by Charles Jousiffe. He won the first running of the Eclipse Stakes, the most valuable race in Britain. He also won the Champion Stakes and was noted for his performances in the top handicap races.

== Breeding ==
Bendigo was sired by Irish Derby winner Ben Battle. Ben Battle was a son of Doncaster Cup winner Rataplan. Bendigo's dam was Hasty Girl, a daughter of Lord Gough. Hasty Girl also foaled 1887 St. Leger Stakes winner Kilwarlin.

== Racing career ==
=== 1883: Three-year-old season ===
Bendigo did not run as a two-year-old. On 9 October 1883 he ran in the Cesarewitch Stakes at the Newmarket Houghton meeting. Carrying 6 st 7 lb he started a 40/1 outsider in the field of 22. He finished in about sixth place, behind winner Don Juan. Two weeks later he ran in the Cambridgeshire Stakes. He again started as an outsider, this time starting at 50/1. Carrying 6 st 10 lb he won the race by a neck from Tonans, with Medicus a further three lengths back in third place. Bendigo had drifted left so badly that many people did not see him at the finish.

=== 1884: Four-year-old season ===
For the Cambridgeshire Stakes of 1884 he started at 100/8, but was carrying significantly more weight (8 st 2 lb). Bendigo and the favourite, Florence, were the leaders in the closing stages. After Bendigo swerved left slightly, Florence won by a head. The two had pulled well clear of Pizarro, who finished in third.

=== 1885: Five-year-old season ===
Bendigo started the 1885 season in March in the Lincolnshire Handicap. He started as the 11/4 favourite and won by three quarters of a length from Bird of Freedom. At Royal Ascot he lined up for the Hardwicke Stakes, where he started as the 4/6 favourite and faced six opponents. He was ridden by J. Snowden and the horses closest to him in the betting were Crafton at 4/1 and Lucerne at 10/1. As the field turned into the finishing straight Crafton took the inside line and went into the lead, followed by Bendigo and Lucerne. As they neared to finish Bendigo caught Crafton and went clear to win by four lengths from Willie Darling, who just caught Crafton for second place on the finishing line. The race was run in 2 minutes 43.4 seconds and was worth £2727. In October Bendigo again lined up for the Cambridgeshire Stakes. After his previous performances he was assigned the weight of 9 st 8 lb and started at 100/8. In the closing stages of the race Bendigo fought with Eastern Emperor for second, the former coming out on top by a neck. Neither could catch Plaisanterie though, who won easily by a couple of lengths.

=== 1886: Six-year-old season ===
In 1886 Bendigo ran in the first running of the Eclipse Stakes at Sandown Park. The race was worth £10,000, a record in British horseracing, and attracted many top horses, including 1884 Epsom Derby winner St. Gatien, Gay Hermit, Candlemas and 1000 Guineas and Epsom Oaks winner Miss Jummy. In the finishing straight Bendigo, ridden by Tom Cannon, took the lead while still pulling hard. With a quarter of a mile left to run he was slightly clear of St. Gatien, with Candlemas and Gay Hermit nearby. St. Gatien attempted to catch Bendigo, but ended up fighting for second place, as Cannon let Bendigo stride clear to win by three lengths from Candlemas, with St. Gatien a further half length back in third place.

=== 1887: Seven-year-old season ===
At Kempton Park in May 1887, Bendigo won the valuable Jubilee Stakes by three quarters of a length from the three-year-old Martley, who was carrying 2 st 9 lb less weight than Bendigo. At Royal Ascot he ran in the new Jubilee Handicap. He finished in race in a dead heat for third place with Aintree. Minting won the race and St. Mirin finished second. At the same meeting in the Hardwicke Stakes he faced another strong field. The betting was headed by undefeated Triple Crown winner Ormonde at 4/5, with Grand Prix de Paris winner Minting at 7/4, Bendigo at 100/8 and Phil at 100/7. The finish was fought out between Minting and Ormonde, with the latter winning by a neck. Bendigo was a further three lengths back in third place. In October he finished second to Humewood in the Cesarewitch Stakes. A couple of weeks later he beat St. Mirin and Biridspord to win the Champion Stakes and at the end of the month he finished second in the Cambridgeshire Stakes.

== Stud career ==
At the end of the 1887 season, Bendigo was retired to stud. He stood at Blankney Stud in Lincolnshire for a fee of 100 guineas. He sired the mare Black Cherry, who became the dam of 1000 Guineas and Epsom Oaks winner Cherry Lass. In total Black Cherry produced 9 winners of 41 races.
