= Charles Wood (jockey) =

British flat-racing jockey (1854–1945)

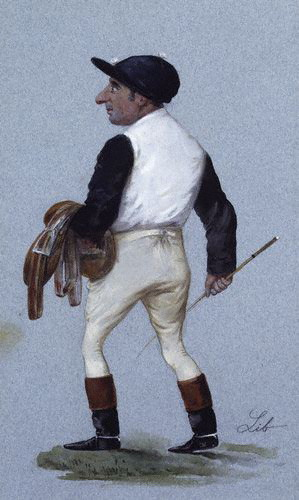
- Caricature of Charles Wood from Vanity Fair, 22 May 1886

Personal information
- Born: 1854
- Died: 1945 (aged 90–91) Eastbourne, Sussex
- Occupation: Jockey

Horse racing career
- Sport: Horse racing

Major racing wins
- British Classic Race wins as jockey: 1,000 Guineas (3); 2000 Guineas; Epsom Oaks; Epsom Derby (3); St Leger Stakes (2)

Racing awards
- British flat racing Champion Jockey (1887)

Significant horses
- Galtee More, St. Simon, St. Gatien

Charles Wood (1854–1945) was an English flat racing jockey.

== Early career ==
Born in the slums of Hull, he ran away aged 11, and became apprentice to Joseph Dawson in Newmarket, where he stayed for seven years. He won his first race in 1872 and was Champion Jockey in 1887. He stood second to Fred Archer for the preceding seven years, becoming champion the year after Fred died. He also rode the unbeaten St. Simon in his three-year-old year when that horse's usual jockey, Fred Archer, could no longer make the weight.

== Scandal ==
Wood then found himself embroiled in a scandal. He was the principal rider to Sir George Chetwynd, 4th Baronet (1849–1917) and trainer Richard Sherrard. The explosion in betting, and rumours of race fixing, was threatening to engulf the sport in scandal, and The Jockey Club decided it needed to act. It targeted Chetwynd, Wood and Sherrard, with the main accusations focused on the pulling of a horse called Success by Wood, and the in-and-out running of Chetwynd's horses, in particular one called Fullerton. The matter was brought to wider attention when the Earl of Durham used his speech at the annual Gimcrack Dinner to make disparaging comments about the three.

In two of the most high-profile libel trials of the Victorian era, Chetwynd sued Durham for libel, asking for £20,000 in damages and Wood sued the publication Licensed Victuallers' Gazette and Hotel Courier for £5,000. The newspaper and Lord Durham failed to prove their allegations but Wood and Chetwynd were both awarded just one farthing in damages which left their reputations severely damaged. Chetwynd resigned from the Jockey Club. Wood was warned off for nine years

== Comeback ==
After a high-profile campaign for his return, Wood finally got his licence back at the age of 42 and bounced back in some style, winning the Triple Crown on Galtee More in 1897. In 1898 he set up a training yard in East Sussex at Jevington and trained for Lord Rosebery, also setting up a yard for his son James. James was severely injured when torpedoed in the 1st World War and Charles sold his Jevington house and yard, and the estate village and retired to Eastbourne in 1919. When he died in Eastbourne in 1945, he left over £60,000.

He was a highly regarded jockey in his time, known as a "strong and competent lightweight" jockey and excellent judge of a race.

== Major wins ==
=== Classic races ===
(United Kingdom) Great Britain

- 1,000 Guineas – Elizabeth (1880), St Marguerite (1882), Reve d'Or (1887)
- 2,000 Guineas – Galtee More (1897)
- Epsom Oaks – Reve d'Or (1887)
- Epsom Derby – St. Blaise (1883), St. Gatien (1884), Galtee More (1897)
- St. Leger – Galtee More (1897), Wildfowler (1898)

=== Other selected races ===
- Ascot Gold Cup – St. Simon (1884), St. Gatien (1885)
- Champion Stakes – Velasquez (1897, 1898)
- Eclipse Stakes – Velasquez (1898)
- Goodwood Cup – St. Simon (1884)

== Bibliography ==
- Tanner, Michael; Cranham, Gerry (1992). Great Jockeys of the Flat. Enfield, Middlesex: Guinness Publishing. ISBN 0-85112-989-7.
- Wright, Howard (1986). The Encyclopaedia of Flat Racing. London: Robert Hale. ISBN 0-7090-2639-0.
- Carr, Josephine (2019). Our Honest Charlie Wood. Sussex: Mabel Publishing. ISBN 978-1-9161301-0-4.
