= Harvester (horse) =

British-bred Thoroughbred racehorse

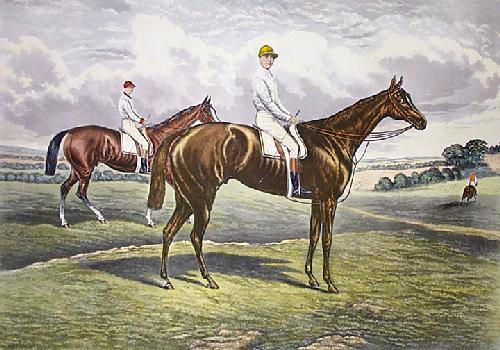
- Contemporary etching of Harvester, with St Gatien in the background.
- Sire: Sterling
- Grandsire: Oxford
- Dam: Wheat-ear
- Damsire: Young Melbourne
- Sex: Stallion
- Foaled: 1881
- Country: United Kingdom of Great Britain and Ireland
- Colour: Brown
- Breeder: Evelyn Boscawen, 6th Viscount Falmouth
- Owner: Evelyn Boscawen, 6th Viscount Falmouth; John Willoughby; James Machell
- Trainer: Mathew Dawson; James Jewitt & James Machell
- Record: 13: 5-1-2
- Earnings: £9,077

Major wins
- Epsom Derby (1884)

Harvester (1881–1906) was a British Thoroughbred racehorse and sire. In a career that lasted from 1883 to 1884 he ran thirteen times and won five races. In 1884 he was involved in the second, and most recent dead heat in the history of The Derby. At the end of his racing career, Harvester was sold and exported to stand as a stallion in Austria. He died in 1906 in Hungary.

== Background ==
Harvester was a brown colt with "dicky-looking forelegs" bred by Evelyn Boscawen, 6th Viscount Falmouth. He raced in Lord Falmouth's colours as a two-year-old and was then bought by Sir John Willoughby. As a result of his sale, Harvester was moved from the stable of Mathew Dawson to be trained at Bedford Lodge, Newmarket, Suffolk by James Jewitt and managed by Captain James Machell.

Harvester's sire, Sterling was a successful racehorse who became an excellent sire. Apart from Harvester, he sired the 2000 Guineas winners Enterprise and Enthusiast, and the outstanding stayer Isonomy. Harvester's dam, Wheat-ear was a top class racemare who won The Oaks in 1870.

== Racing career ==
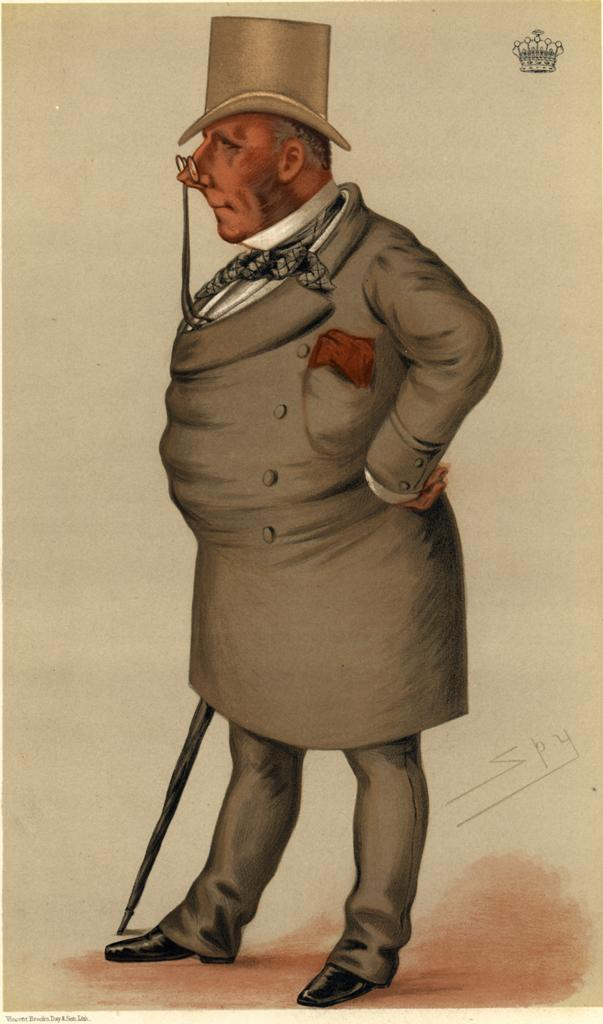
Lord Falmouth, Harvester's breeder and first owner

=== 1883: two-year-old season ===
As a two-year-old, Harvester ran six times and won twice. He first appeared at Newmarket at the start of July when he started at 8/1 for the Chesterfield Stakes. He made most of the running before being caught inside the final furlong and beaten one and a half lengths by the filly Superba. A month later, Harvester ran twice in quick succession at Goodwood. He finished unplaced behind Bushey when second favourite for the Richmond Stakes and was unplaced again two days later behind Superba in a Rous Memorial Plate. At Newmarket in October he won the Triennial Produce Stakes from Knight Errant and the Clearwell Stakes, by a head from Condor before returning to the same course later in the month for the Dewhurst Stakes. He ran prominently for much of the way before fading into sixth place behind an unnamed filly who later became known as Queen Adelaide.

Despite his unremarkable form, Harvester was considered a leading Derby contender. This could be explained by the facts that many of the best horses of his generation (notably St. Simon) had not been entered for the race, while others, such as his stable companion Busybody and Queen Adelaide, were fillies more likely to run in the Oaks.

=== 1884: three-year-old season ===
==== Spring ====
By the end of the winter, Harvester, who had made excellent physical progress, was 12/1 second favourite for the Derby behind Queen Adelaide and well-fancied for the 2000 Guineas. Before the season began, Lord Falmouth decided to retire from the turf and sell all of his horses at a public auction. As a leading Derby fancy, Harvester was expected to attract considerable interest, and it was predicted that he would fetch at least £5,000. At Newmarket on 28 April Harvester was sold for 8,600 guineas to Sir John Willoughby, a young Guards officer who had also bought Queen Adelaide. Although some felt that Willoughby had paid far too much, others noted that the colt's trainer Mathew Dawson, who presumably knew him best, had bid up to £7,000 before dropping out of the auction.

Two days after the sale, Harvester ran in the 2000 Guineas at Newmarket on 30 April. His odds for the race had lengthened from 9/2 to 20/1 following a poor trial run on the day before the race, in which he was badly beaten by his new stable companion St Medard. Scot Free was a very impressive winner of the Guineas, but Harvester exceeded expectations by making the early running and failing by only a head to hold second place from St Medard. Harvester and Scot Free met again in the Payne Stakes over ten furlongs at Newmarket on 14 May. Receiving seven pounds from the Guineas winner, Harvester, looking much fitter than he had done before the Guineas, won comfortably by a length despite being eased in the closing stages, and his price for the Derby was cut from 6/1 to 3/1 favourite. Three days before the Epsom Classic, Harvester was found to be lame and his odds drifted out to 33/1 as it was thought unlikely that he would run. He was only confirmed as a starter after a successful exercise gallop on the morning of the race, although there was some speculation that the injury was a fabrication by Machell and Willoughby designed to secure better odds.

==== Epsom Derby ====
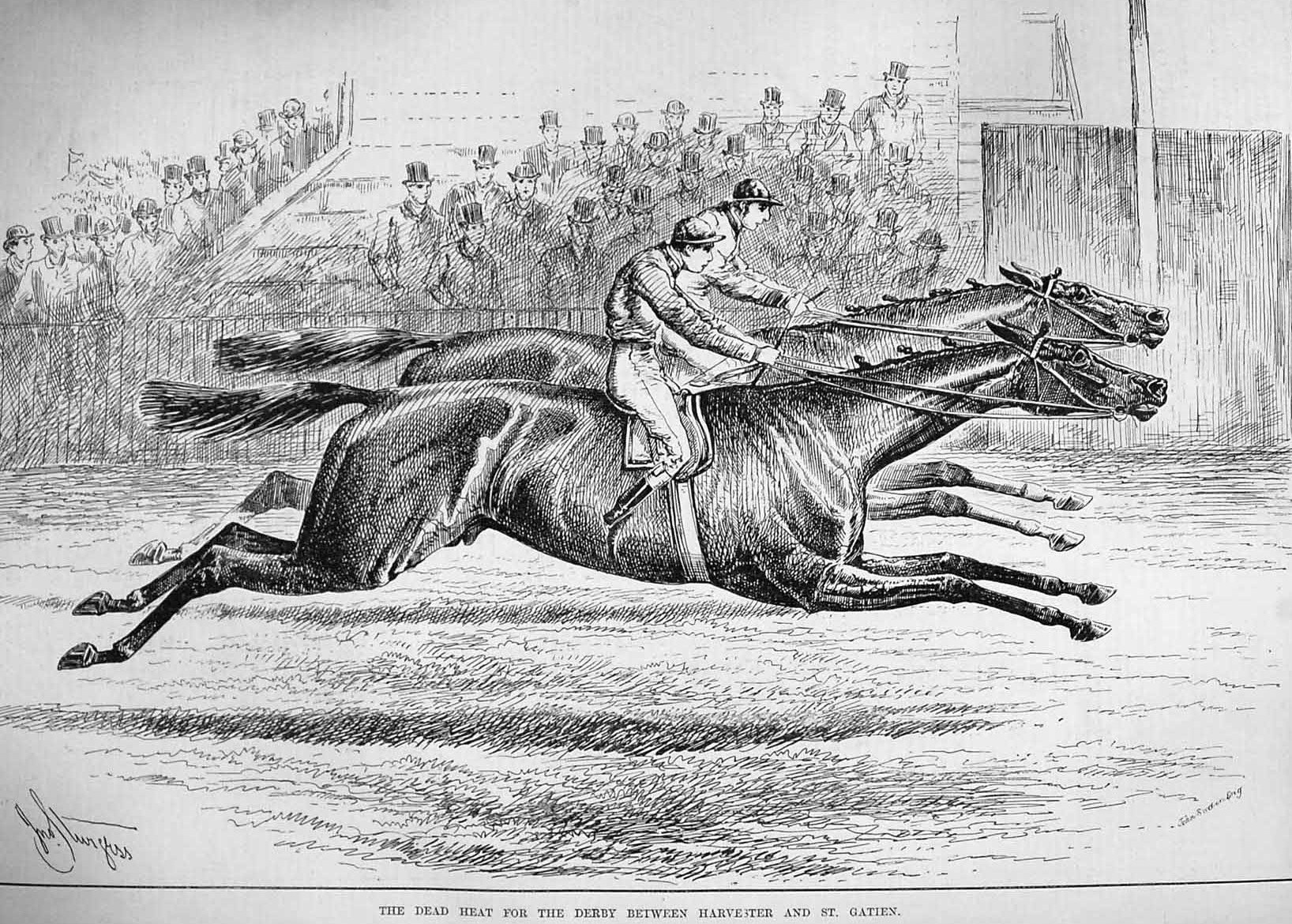
The finish of the 1884 Derby from the Illustrated London News. Harvester is on the near side

At Epsom on 28 May, on a "cold and cheerless day", Harvester started at odds of 100/7 in a field of fifteen. He was regarded as his trainer's third string behind Queen Adelaide, who started 5/2 favourite and St Medard (6/1). Harvester was held up in the early stages before moving into contention as Borneo led the field into the straight. St. Gatien took the lead a quarter of a mile from the finish but was soon joined by Harvester and the two colts were "locked together" throughout the final furlong in a "tremendous race". A hundred yards from the post, St Gatien appeared to have the advantage, but Loates rode a vigorous finish and drove Harvester forward in the last strides. The two leaders crossed the line together, just ahead of Queen Adelaide who finished strongly after being blocked at a crucial stage. The judge was unable to separate Harvester and St. Gatien and a dead heat was called. The common practice at the time was for dead heats to be settled by the two horses immediately running again over the same course, although the prize could be shared if both owners agreed. When St Gatien's owners offered to divide the stakes, Willoughby and Machell accepted, predictably in view of Harvester's leg problems.

Willoughby later made and then withdrew an official objection to St Gatien on a technical point relating to the colt's pedigree.

==== After Epsom ====
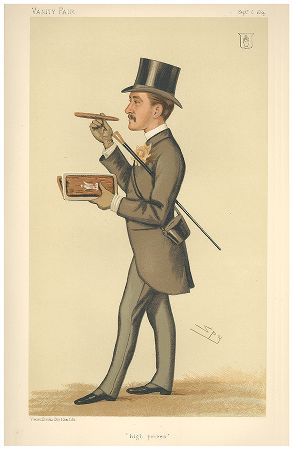
John Willoughby, who owned Harvester in 1884

On his first start after his Derby win Harvester was sent to Royal Ascot in mid-June for the Hardwicke Stakes in which he was ridden by Fred Archer and started 13/8 favourite against four opponents. He started promisingly but then dropped back to last place, and although he made some progress in the closing stages he was never a threat and finished a remote third to Tristan. The winner had been easily beaten by St Gatien in the Gold Vase on the first day of the meeting. On 30 July, Harvester started at odds of 1/3 in the Gratwicke Stakes over one and a half miles at Goodwood. His opposition did not appear to be strong, and he won very easily, leading from the start and coming home ten lengths clear of the filly Clochette. The form of the race may have been rather better than it first appeared, as Clochette won the Yorkshire Oaks on her next start. The win took Harvester's earnings for the season to £6,440. He ran again at Goodwood in the Drawing Room Stakes on the following day and was beaten by Cormeille in a race in which he was reported to have been "cruelly knocked about".

On a "bright and fine" day at Doncaster on 11 September, Harvester started at 11/2 in a field of thirteen runners for the St Leger at Doncaster. He appeared with his forelegs heavily bandaged and was described as moving "gingerly" in the paddock before the race. Harvester tracked the leaders in the early stages, but dropped out of contention before the straight and finished eighth behind The Lambkin. He was reported to have finished lame, and never raced again.

On 9 October, Harvester appeared in the sales ring for the second time in less than six months, but on this occasion, he was not sold, having failed to reach his reserve price of £3,000. Shortly afterwards he was bought privately by James Machell for an undisclosed sum. Willoughby, having only become involved in racing two years earlier, had by now lost all interest in the sport, sold all his bloodstock and volunteered for an expedition to Khartoum.

== Stud career ==
Harvester appears to have made no impact at stud. He was sold in 1893 for 850 guineas to stand as a stallion at the Egyed stud in Austria-Hungary. Harvester died in 1906 at the Zabola Stud in Hungary.

== Pedigree ==
Pedigree of Harvester (GB), brown stallion, 1881
| Sire Sterling (GB) 1868 | Oxford; 1857 | Birdcatcher | Sir Hercules |
| Sire Sterling (GB) 1868 | Oxford; 1857 | Birdcatcher | Guiccioli |
| Sire Sterling (GB) 1868 | Oxford; 1857 | Honey Dear | Plenipotentiary |
| Sire Sterling (GB) 1868 | Oxford; 1857 | Honey Dear | My Dear |
| Sire Sterling (GB) 1868 | Whisper; 1857 | Flatcatcher | Touchstone* |
| Sire Sterling (GB) 1868 | Whisper; 1857 | Flatcatcher | Decoy |
| Sire Sterling (GB) 1868 | Whisper; 1857 | Silence | Melbourne* |
| Sire Sterling (GB) 1868 | Whisper; 1857 | Silence | Secret |
| Dam Wheat-ear (GB) 1867 | Young Melbourne; 1855 | Melbourne* | Humphrey Clinker* |
| Dam Wheat-ear (GB) 1867 | Young Melbourne; 1855 | Melbourne* | Cervantes mare* |
| Dam Wheat-ear (GB) 1867 | Young Melbourne; 1855 | Clarissa | Pantaloon |
| Dam Wheat-ear (GB) 1867 | Young Melbourne; 1855 | Clarissa | Glencoe mare |
| Dam Wheat-ear (GB) 1867 | Swallow; 1855 | Cotherstone | Touchstone* |
| Dam Wheat-ear (GB) 1867 | Swallow; 1855 | Cotherstone | Emma |
| Dam Wheat-ear (GB) 1867 | Swallow; 1855 | The Wryneck | Slane |
| Dam Wheat-ear (GB) 1867 | Swallow; 1855 | The Wryneck | Gitana (Family: 15-b) |

* Harvester is inbred 4S x 3D to the stallion Melbourne, meaning that he appears fourth generation on the sire side of his pedigree, and third generation on the dam side of his pedigree.

* Harvester is inbred 4S x 4D to the stallion Touchstone, meaning that he appears fourth generation on the sire side of his pedigree, and fourth generation on the dam side of his pedigree.
