= Queen's Vase =

Flat horse race in Britain

- Class: Group 2
- Location: Ascot Racecourse; Ascot, England
- Inaugurated: 1838
- Race type: Flat / Thoroughbred
- Website: Ascot

Race information
- Distance: 1m 6f 34y (2,847 metres)
- Surface: Turf
- Track: Right-handed
- Qualification: Three-year-olds
- Weight: 9 st 2 lb Allowances; 3 lb for fillies Penalties; 3 lb for G1 winners * * since 31 August last year
- Purse: £262,500 (2022); 1st: £155,400

Queen's Vase
2026
Limestone	Del Maro	Ranga Tang

Previous years
2025
Carmers	Furthur	Rahiebb
2024
Illinois	Highbury	Birdman
2023
Gregory	Saint George	Chesspiece
2022
Eldar Eldarov	Zechariah	Hafit
2021
Kemari	Wordsworth	Stowell

2020-2011
2020
Santiago	Berkshire Rocco	Al Dabaran
2019
Dashing Willoughby	Barbados	Nayef Road
2018
Kew Gardens	Southern France	Nelson
2017
Stradivarius	Count Octave	Secret Advisor
2016
Sword Fighter	Harbour Law	Twilight Payment
2015
Aloft	Tommy Docc	Future Empire
2014
Hartnell	Century	Marzocco
2013
Leading Light	Feel Like Dancing	Boite
2012
Estimate	Athens	Ed De Gas
2011
Namibian	Solar Sky	Eternal Heart

2010-2001
2010
Mikhail Glinka	Theology	Total Command
2009
Holberg	Yankee Doodle	Mastery
2008
Patkai	Amerigo	Gravitation
2007
Mahler	Veracity	Secret Tune
2006
Soapy Danger	Galient	Ermine Sea
2005
Melrose Avenue	Mr Vegas	Helvetio
2004
Duke of Venice	Two Miles West	Top Seed
2003
Shanty Star	Singleton	Cruzspiel
2002
Mamool	Mr Dinos	Ancestor
2001
And Beyond	When In Rome	Aquarius

2000-1991
2000
Dalampour	Dutch Harrier	Samsaam
1999
Endorsement	Time Zone	Compton Ace
1998
Maridpour	Laurentide	Capri
1997
Windsor Castle	Three Cheers	Book At Bedtime
1996
Gordi	Athenry	Persian Punch
1995
Stelvio	Double Eclipse	Pedraza
1994
Silver Wedge	Ptoto	Summit
1993
Infrasonic	Silverdale	Kassab
1992
Landowner	Belgran	Goldsmiths' Hall
1991
Jendali	Silver Rainbow	Le Corsaire

1990-1988
1990
River God	Parting Moment	Kasayid
1989
Weld	Demawend	Polar Run
1988
Green Adventure	Moscow Society	Bold Stranger

The Queen's Vase is a Group 2 flat horse race in Great Britain open to three-year-old horses. It is run at Ascot over a distance of 1 mile 6 furlongs and 34 yards (2,847 metres), and it is scheduled to take place each year in June.

== History ==
The event was established over a distance of 2 miles in 1838, and its original trophy was a gold vase donated by Queen Victoria. The race was initially confined to horses aged three, but it was opened to older horses in 1840. Its title was changed to the King's Vase in 1903, and it was given its current name in 1960.

The present system of race grading was introduced in 1971, and for a period the Queen's Vase held Group 3 status. It was relegated to Listed class in 1986, and it was restricted to three-year-olds in 1987. It returned to Group 3 level in 1991 and was downgraded to Listed status again in 2014. However in a move to recognise the importance of staying Flat races in the calendar the European Pattern Committee decided to upgrade the race to Group 2 status in 2017 while reducing its distance to 1 mile and 6 furlongs.

The Queen's Vase is now contested on the second day of the five-day Royal Ascot meeting. It is one of three perpetual trophies at the meeting, along with the Royal Hunt Cup and the Gold Cup, which can be kept permanently by the winning owners.

The 2013 running was renamed the 'Queen's Vase In Memory of Sir Henry Cecil' in memory of Sir Henry Cecil who died on 11 June 2013. Sir Henry had trained the winners of more races than anyone at the Royal meeting (75), including eight winners of the Queen's Vase.

== Records ==
Leading jockey (6 wins):

- George Fordham – Arsenal (1857), Sedbury (1858), Horror (1860), Marie Stuart (1875), Ambassadress (1881), Tristan (1882)

Leading trainer (8 wins):

- Sir Henry Cecil – Falkland (1972), General Ironside (1976), Le Moss (1978), Arden (1987), River God (1990), Jendali (1991), Stelvio (1995), Endorsement (1999)

== Winners since 1900 ==
Year	Winner	Jockey	Trainer	Time
1900	Solitaire	Lester Reiff	Fred Day	3:34.00
1901	Mackintosh	Sam Loates	William Waugh	3:34.00
1902	Ice Maiden	Frank Hardy	John Porter	3:50.20
1903	Zinfandel	Mornington Cannon	Major Beatty	
1904	Bachelors Button	William Halsey	Charles Peck	
1905	Bachelors Button	Danny Maher	Charles Peck	
1906	The White Knight	Billy Higgs	Robert Sherwood Jr.	
1907	Golden Measure	Danny Maher	Major Edwards	3:28.60
1908	Pillo	Gabriel Tortorelo	H Darling	3:28.00
1909	Amadis	Walter Earl	William Waugh	3:36.60
1910	Charles O'Malley	Steve Donoghue	Lewis	
1911	Martingale II	Henri Jellis	Captain Dewhurst	
1912	Tidal Wave	Snowy Whalley	Alfred Sadler	
1913	Shogun	William Huxley	Richard Wootton	3:24.80
1914	Glorvina	Josiah Prout	George Lambton	3:27.40
1915–18	No Race			
1919	Silonyx	Victor Smyth	William Waugh	
1920	Kentish Cob	Joe Childs	Alec Taylor Jr.	3:31.80
1921	Copyright	Frank Bullock	Basil Jarvis	3:26.40
1922	Golden Myth	Charlie Elliott	Jack Jarvis	3:24.80
1923	Puttenden	Joe Childs	Alec Taylor Jr.	3:31.20
1924	Audlem	Charlie Smirke	C Davis	3:33.20
1925	Kentish Knock	Tommy Weston	George Lambton	3:23.20
1926	High Art	Ronald James	George Dundas	3:40.40
1927	Adieu	Michael Beary	Walter Griggs	3:28.60
1928	Maid Of Perth	Jack Sirett	Fred Darling	3:35.80
1929	Covenden	Rufus Beasley	Tom Waugh	3:28.00
1930	Trimdon	Bobby Jones	Joseph Lawson	3:35.60
1931	Pomme D'Api	Michael Beary	Richard Dawson	3:33.00
1932	Silvermere	Freddy Lane	Walter Nightingall	3:30.00
1933	Gainslaw	Tommy Weston	Fred Leader	3:36.20
1934	Duplicate	Frank Sharpe	Norman Scobie	3:30.00
1935	Flash Bye	Jack Sirett	Joseph Lawson	3:37.40
1936	Rondo	Peter Maher	F Pratt	3:28.40
1937	Fearless Fox	Eph Smith	Jack Jarvis	3:27.00
1938	Foxglove II	Gordon Richards	Fred Darling	3:27.40
1939	Atout Maitre	Walter Sibbritt	Herbert Blagrave	3:29.40
1940–45	No Race			
1946	Look Ahead	Doug Smith	Cecil Boyd-Rochfort	3:39.60
1947	Auralia	Doug Smith	Reg Day	3:29.00
1948	Estoc	René Bertiglia	(Trained in France)	3:33.80
1949	Lone Eagle	Doug Smith	Cecil Boyd-Rochfort	3:30.20
1950	Fastlad	Freddie Palmer	(Trained in France)	3:27.00
1951	Faux Pas	Eph Smith	Joseph Lawson	3:28.60
1952	Souepi	Charlie Elliott	G R Digby	3:30.40
1953	Absolve	Lester Piggott	Victor Smyth	3:35.20
1954	Prescription	Eph Smith	Jack Jarvis	3:43.40
1955	Prince Barle	Manny Mercer	Joseph Lawson	3:34.38
1956	French Beige	Geoff Littlewood	Harry Peacock	3:33.88
1957	Tenterhooks	Edgar Britt	Charles Elsey	3:29.88
1958	Even Money	Scobie Breasley	Vincent O'Brien	3:27.60
1959	Vivi Tarquin	Derrick Greening	Seamus McGrath	3:33.48
1960	Prolific	Duncan Keith	Walter Nightingall	3:30.72
1961	Black King	Eddie Hide	Bill Elsey	3:41.90
1962	Pavot	Joe Sime	Paddy Prendergast	3:38.81
1963	Hereford	James Hunter	Herbert Murless	3:40.00
1964	I Titan	M Giovannelli	Noel Murless	3:31.21
1965	Beddard	Joe Sime	Herbert Murless	3:30.05
1966	Bally Russe	Scobie Breasley	Noel Murless	3:24.76
1967	The Accuser	Frankie Durr	Dick Hern	3:30.70
1968	Zorba II	Ron Hutchinson	Paddy Prendergast	3:30.68
1969	Tantivy	Sandy Barclay	Bill Elsey	3:31.09
1970	Yellow River	Tommy Carter	Scobie Breasley	3:27.88
1971	Parnell	Ron Hutchinson	Stephen Quirke	3:43.20
1972	Falkland	Greville Starkey	Henry Cecil	3:30.78
1973	Tara Brooch	Pat Eddery	Seamus McGrath	3:46.20
1974	Royal Aura	Pat Eddery	Peter Walwyn	3:28.41
1975	Blood Royal	Lester Piggott	Vincent O'Brien	3:27.83
1976	General Ironside	Lester Piggott	Henry Cecil	3:26.74
1977	Millionaire	Pat Eddery	Peter Walwyn	3:37.07
1978	Le Moss	Geoff Baxter	Henry Cecil	3:29.65
1979	Buttress	Willie Carson	Dick Hern	3:31.56
1980	Toondra	Paul Cook	Michael Jarvis	3:39.49
1981	Ore	Willie Carson	Kevin Prendergast	3:29.26
1982	Evzon	Lester Piggott	Clive Brittain	3:25.01
1983	Santella Man	Greville Starkey	Guy Harwood	3:25.19
1984	Baynoun	Willie Carson	Fulke Johnson Houghton	3:30.69
1985	Wassl Merbayeh	Richard Hills	Harry Thomson Jones	3:27.23
1986	Stavordale	Michael Roberts	Harry Thomson Jones	3:28.38
1987	Arden	Steve Cauthen	Henry Cecil	3:37.02
1988	Green Adventure	Greville Starkey	Guy Harwood	3:24.40
1989	Weld	Bruce Raymond	William Jarvis	3:20.54
1990	River God	Steve Cauthen	Henry Cecil	3:26.15
1991	Jendali	Steve Cauthen	Henry Cecil	3:31.26
1992	Landowner	Ray Cochrane	John Gosden	3:25.29
1993	Infrasonic	Pat Eddery	André Fabre	3:46.47
1994	Silver Wedge	Michael Hills	Geoff Lewis	3:29.65
1995	Stelvio	Michael Kinane	Henry Cecil	3:28.64
1996	Gordi	Michael Kinane	Dermot Weld	3:28.75
1997	Windsor Castle	Richard Quinn	Paul Cole	3:29.48
1998	Maridpour	Walter Swinburn	Sir Michael Stoute	3:40.23
1999	Endorsement	Kieren Fallon	Henry Cecil	3:33.28
2000	Dalampour	Kieren Fallon	Sir Michael Stoute	3:36.27
2001	And Beyond	Kevin Darley	Mark Johnston	3:31.45
2002	Mamool	Frankie Dettori	Saeed bin Suroor	3:29.45
2003	Shanty Star	Kevin Darley	Mark Johnston	3:29.12
2004	Duke of Venice	Frankie Dettori	Saeed bin Suroor	3:29.14
2005 (Note: The 2005 running took place at York)	Melrose Avenue	Kevin Darley	Mark Johnston	3:21.20
2006	Soapy Danger	Kevin Darley	Mark Johnston	3:25.60
2007	Mahler	Michael Kinane	Aidan O'Brien	3:32.65
2008	Patkai	Ryan Moore	Sir Michael Stoute	3:27.86
2009	Holberg	Joe Fanning	Mark Johnston	3:24.13
2010	Mikhail Glinka	Johnny Murtagh	Aidan O'Brien	3:27.98
2011	Namibian	Silvestre de Sousa	Mark Johnston	3:40.97
2012	Estimate	Ryan Moore	Sir Michael Stoute	3:34.05
2013	Leading Light	Joseph O'Brien	Aidan O'Brien	3:25.26
2014	Hartnell	Joe Fanning	Mark Johnston	3:24.73
2015	Aloft	Ryan Moore	Aidan O'Brien	3:28.40
2016	Sword Fighter	Colm O'Donoghue	Aidan O'Brien	3:34.55
2017	Stradivarius	Andrea Atzeni	John Gosden	3:01.47
2018	Kew Gardens	Ryan Moore	Aidan O'Brien	3:00.89
2019	Dashing Willoughby	Oisin Murphy	Andrew Balding	3:07.86
2020	Santiago	Ryan Moore	Aidan O'Brien	3:05.67
2021	Kemari	William Buick	Charlie Appleby	3:04.02
2022	Eldar Eldarov	David Egan	Roger Varian	3:01.33
2023	Gregory	Frankie Dettori	John & Thady Gosden	3:03.13
2024	Illinois	Ryan Moore	Aidan O'Brien	3:00.57
2025	Carmers	Billy Lee	Paddy Twomey	2:59.53
2026	Limestone	Dylan Browne McMonagle	Joseph O'Brien	3.02.07

== Earlier winners ==
- 1838: Mecca
- 1839: Mendizabal
- 1840: St Francis
- 1841: Satirist
- 1842: St Francis
- 1843: Gorhambury
- 1844: Alice Hawthorn
- 1845: Sweetmeat
- 1846: Grimston
- 1847: The Hero
- 1848: Gardenia
- 1849: Glenalvon
- 1850: Mildew
- 1851: Cariboo
- 1852: Leopold
- 1853: Rataplan
- 1854: The Hermit
- 1855: Oulston
- 1856: Fisherman
- 1857: Arsenal
- 1858: Sedbury
- 1859: Schism
- 1860: Horror
- 1861: Parmesan
- 1862: Tim Whiffler
- 1863: Adventurer
- 1864: Young Rapid
- 1865: Eltham
- 1866: Elland
- 1867: Mail Train
- 1868: Blinkhoolie
- 1869: Thorwaldsen
- 1870: Siderolite
- 1871: Christopher Sly
- 1872: Albert Victor
- 1873: Thorn
- 1874: Organist
- 1875: Marie Stuart
- 1876: Thunder
- 1877: Skylark
- 1878: Verneuil
- 1879: Isonomy
- 1880: Chippendale
- 1881: Ambassadress
- 1882: Tristan
- 1883: Border Minstrel
- 1884: St Gatien
- 1885: Thebais
- 1886: Bird of Freedom
- 1887: Quilp
- 1888: Exmoor
- 1889: Morglay
- 1890: Tyrant
- 1891: Mons Meg
- 1892: Martagon
- 1893: Convent
- 1894: Quaesitum
- 1895: Florizel II
- 1896: Pride
- 1897: Count Schomberg
- 1898: The Rush
- 1899: no race

== See also ==
- Horse racing in Great Britain
- List of British flat horse races
