= George Cox =

George Cox may refer to:

- George Cox (baseball) (1904–1995), baseball player
- George Cox Sr (1873–1949), English cricketer
- George Cox Jr (1911–1985), English cricketer, son of George Cox, Sr.
- George Cox (Jamaican cricketer) (1877–1945), Jamaican cricketer
- George Cox (cricketer, born 1859) (1859–1936), English cricketer
- George Cox (New South Wales politician) (1824–1901), member of the New South Wales Legislative Council and the New South Wales Legislative Assembly
- George Cox (Ottawa politician) (1834–1909), mayor of Ottawa, Ontario, 1894
- George Cox (Victorian politician) (born 1931), member of the Victorian Legislative Assembly and the Victorian Legislative Council
- George Albertus Cox (1840–1914), Canadian capitalist and Senator
- George B. Cox (1853–1916), Cincinnati machine politician known as Boss Cox
- George Bernard Cox (1886–1978), British architect
- George C. Cox (1851–1903), American photographer
- George G. Cox (1842–1920). American politician
- George M. Cox (1892–1977), flying ace
- George R. Cox (1932–1969), American politician in Wyoming
- George Valentine Cox (1786–1875), English author
- George William Cox (1827–1902), British historian
- George Cox Kahekili Ke'eaumoku II (1784–1824), governor of Maui
- George Cox (footballer) (born 1998), English footballer
- George L. Cox (1878–1947), American actor and film director

== See also ==
- Cox (surname)
