= Champion Stakes =

Flat horse race in Britain

Champion Stakes (British Champions Middle Distance)
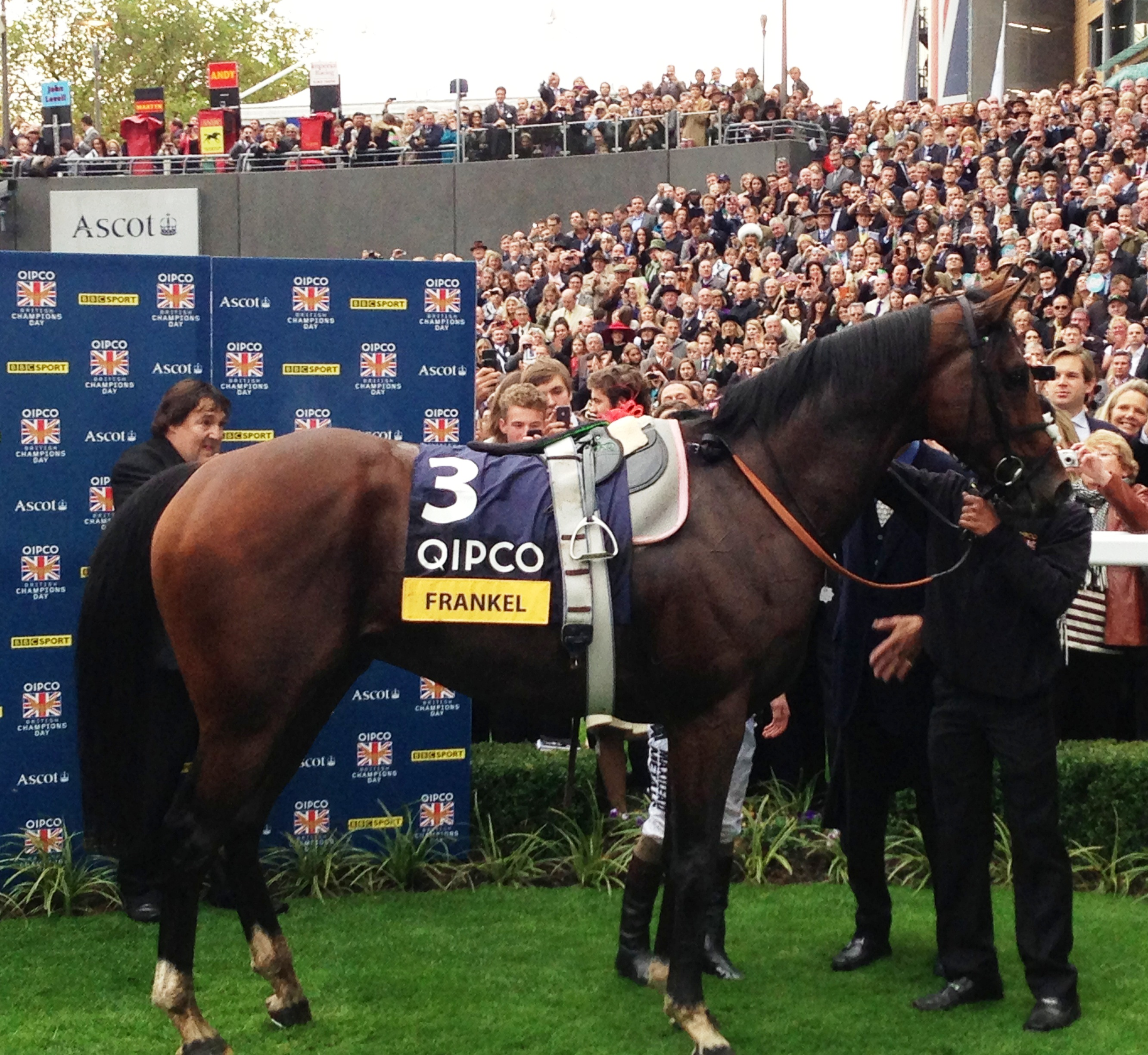
- Frankel in the winner's enclosure after winning the 2012 edition
- Class: Group 1
- Location: Ascot Racecourse; Ascot, England (since 2011)
- Inaugurated: 1877
- Race type: Flat / Thoroughbred
- Sponsor: QIPCO
- Website: Ascot

Race information
- Distance: 1m 1f 212y (2,004 metres)
- Surface: Turf
- Track: Right-handed
- Qualification: Three-years-old and up
- Weight: 9 st 3 lb (3yo); 9 st 7 lb (4yo+); Allowances; 3 lb for fillies and mares
- Purse: £1,417,500 (2025); 1st: £803,864

Champion Stakes
2026
Ombudsman	Calandagan	Bay City Roller

Previous years
2025
Calandagan	Ombudsman	Almaqam
2024
Anmaat	Calandagan	Royal Rhyme
2023
King Of Steel	Via Sistina	Horizon Dore
2022
Bay Bridge	Adayar	My Prospero
2021
Sealiway	Dubai Honour	Mac Swiney

2020-2011
2020
Addeybb	Skalleti	Magical
2019
Magical	Addeybb	Deirdre
2018
Cracksman	Crystal Ocean	Subway Dancer
2017
Cracksman	Poet's Word	Highland Reel
2016
Almanzor	Found	Jack Hobbs
2015
Fascinating Rock	Found	Jack Hobbs
2014
Noble Mission	Al Kazeem	Free Eagle
2013
Farhh	Cirrus Des Aigles	Ruler Of The World
2012
Frankel	Cirrus Des Aigles	Nathaniel
2011
Cirrus Des Aigles	So You Think	Snow Fairy

2010–2001
2010
Twice Over	Vision D'Etat	Debussy
2009
Twice Over	Mawatheeq	Sariska
2008
New Approach	Twice Over	Linngari
2007
Literato	Eagle Mountain	Doctor Dino
2006
Pride	Rob Roy	Hurricane Run
2005
David Junior	Pride	Maraahel
2004
Haafhd	Chorist	Azamour
2003
Rakti	Carnival Dancer	Indian Creek
2002
Storming Home	Moon Ballad	Noverre
2001
Nayef	Tobougg	Indian Creek

2000–1991
2000
Kalanisi	Montjeu	Distant Music
1999
Alborada	Shiva	Kabool
1998
Alborada	Insatiable	Daylami
1997
Pilsudski	Loup Sauvage	Bahhare
1996
Bosra Sham	Halling	Timarida
1995
Spectrum	Riyadian	Montjoy
1994
Dernier Empereur	Grand Lodge	Muhtarram
1993
Hatoof	Ezzoud	Dernier Empereur
1992
Rodrigo De Triano	Lahib	Environment Friend
1991
Tel Quel	Cruachan	In The Groove

1990–1981
1990
In The Groove	Linamix	Legal Case
1989
Legal Case	Dolpour	Ile De Chypre
1988
Indian Skimmer	Persian Heights	Doyoun
1987
Triptych	Most Welcome	Saint Andrews
1986
Triptych	Celestial Storm	Park Express
1985
Pebbles	Slip Anchor	Palace Music
1984
Palace Music	Pebbles	Raft
1983
Cormorant Wood	Flame of Tara	Miramar Reef
1982
Time Charter	Prima Voce	Noalto
1981
Vayrann	Cairn Rouge	Amyndas

1980–1971
1980
Cairn Rouge	Master Willie	Nadjar
1979
Northern Baby	Town and Country	Haul Knight
1978
Swiss Maid	Hawaiian Sound	Gunner
1977
Flying Water	Relkino	North Stoke
1976
Vitiges	Rose Bowl	Northern Treasure
1975
Rose Bowl	Allez France	Ramirez
1974
Giacometti	Northern Gem	Pitcairn
1973
Hurry Harriet	Allez France	Sharp Edge
1972
Brigadier Gerard	Riverman	Lord David
1971
Brigadier Gerard	Rarity	Welsh Pageant

1970–1969
1970
Lorenzaccio	Nijinsky	Hotfoot
1969
Flossy	Park Top	Lorenzaccio

The Champion Stakes is a Group 1 flat horse race in Great Britain open to thoroughbreds aged three years or older. It is run at Ascot over a distance of 1 mile 1 furlong and 212 yards (2,004 metres), and it is scheduled to take place as part of British Champions Day each year in October.

== History ==
The event was established in 1877, and it was originally held at Newmarket. The inaugural running was won by Springfield. By the end of the century it had been won by five Classic winners.

The present system of race grading was introduced in 1971, and the Champion Stakes was classed at the highest level, Group 1.

The race was included in the Breeders' Cup Challenge series in 2009 and 2010. The winner earned an automatic invitation to compete in the Breeders' Cup Turf.

The Champion Stakes was transferred to Ascot in 2011. It became part of a newly created fixture called British Champions Day. It now serves as the middle-distance final of the British Champions Series.

With an increased prize fund of £1,300,000, the Champion Stakes was Britain's richest horse race in 2011. The status was reclaimed by The Derby in 2012.

== Records ==
Most successful horse (3 wins):

- Tristan – 1882, 1883, 1884

Leading jockey (6 wins):

- Danny Maher – Osboch (1901), Pretty Polly (1905), Polymelus (1906), Llangwm (1908), Bayardo (1909), Lemberg (1910)
- Charlie Elliott – Ellangowan (1923), Asterus (1927), Goyescas (1931), Djeddah (1949), Dynamiter (1951, 1952)

Leading trainer (8 wins):

- Alec Taylor Jr. – Sceptre (1903), Bayardo (1909), Lemberg (1910, 1911), Gay Crusader (1917), My Dear (1918), Buchan (1919), Picaroon (1925)

Leading owner (6 wins):

- HH Aga Khan III – Rustom Pasha (1930), Dastur (1933, dead-heat), Umidwar (1934), Nasrullah (1943), Migoli (1947), Hafiz (1955)

Dam of two winners:

- Kind- Frankel (2012) Noble Mission (2014)

== Winners ==
Year	Winner	Age	Jockey	Trainer	Owner	Time
1877	Springfield	4	Tom Cannon Sr.	James Ryan	J H Houldsworth	
1878	Jannette	3	Fred Archer	Mathew Dawson	6th Viscount Falmouth	
1879	Rayon d'Or	3	J Goater	Tom Jennings	Frederic de Lagrange	
1880	Robert the Devil	3	E Rossiter	Charles Blanton	Charles Brewer	2:10.0
1881	Bend Or	4	Fred Archer	Robert Peck	1st Duke of Westminster	2:23.6
1882 (Note: The 1882, 1884 and 1933 races were dead-heats and have joint winners) (dh)	Tristan; Thebais	4; 4	Fred Archer; George Fordham	Tom Jennings; Alec Taylor Sr.	C J Lefevre; William Stirling Crawfurd	
1883	Tristan	5	Frederic Webb	Tom Jennings	C J Lefevre	
1884 (dh)	Tristan; Lucerne	6; 4	Frederic Webb; Tom Cannon Sr.	Tom Jennings; Alfred Hayhoe	C J Lefevre; Leopold de Rothschild	
1885	Paradox	3	Fred Archer	John Porter	William Broderick Cloete	
1886	Ormonde	3	Fred Archer	John Porter	1st Duke of Westminster	2:19.0
1887	Bendigo	7	John Watts	Charles Jousiffe	H T Barclay	
1888	Friar's Balsam	3	George Barrett	John Porter	Sir Frederick Johnstone	
1889	Gold	3	D Hunt	Tom Jennings	Prince Soltykoff	
1890	Amphion	4	Tom Cannon Sr.	James Chandler	General Byrne	2:10.2
1891	Orion	3	George Barrett	John Porter	1st Duke of Westminster	
1892	Orme	3	George Barrett	John Porter	1st Duke of Westminster	2:18.8
1893	Le Nicham	3	Tommy Loates	Alfred Hayhoe	Leopold de Rothschild	
1894	La Fleche	5	John Watts	Richard Marsh	Maurice de Hirsch	
1895	Laveno	3	Fred Finlay	James Ryan	J H Houldsworth	
1896	Labrador	3	Mornington Cannon	John Porter	1st Duke of Westminster	
1897	Velasquez	3	Charles Wood	William Walters, Jnr.	5th Earl of Rosebery	
1898	Velasquez	4	Charles Wood	Charles Wood	5th Earl of Rosebery	
1899	Dieudonne	4	Mornington Cannon	Richard Marsh	8th Duke of Devonshire	2:19.40
1900	Solitaire	4	Lester Reiff	Fred Day	Sir Ernest Cassel	3:10.00
1901	Osboch	3	Danny Maher	Richard Marsh	4th Baron Wolverton	3:10.80
1902	Veles	4	Skeets Martin	Robert Sherwood Jr.	Sir R W Griffith	3:05.40
1903	Sceptre	4	Frank Hardy	Alec Taylor Jr.	Sir William Bass	
1904	Bachelor's Button	5	William Halsey	Charles Peck	Solomon Joel	
1905	Pretty Polly	4	Danny Maher	Peter Gilpin	Eustace Loder	
1906	Polymelus	4	Danny Maher	Charles Peck	Solomon Joel	
1907	Galvani	3	Bernard Dillon	Peter Gilpin	Eustace Loder	
1908	Llangwm	3	Danny Maher	William Waugh	B Walker	
1909	Bayardo	3	Danny Maher	Alec Taylor Jr.	Alfred W. Cox	
1910	Lemberg	3	Danny Maher	Alec Taylor Jr.	Alfred W. Cox	
1911	Lemberg	4	Frank Wootton	Alec Taylor Jr.	Alfred W. Cox	Walkover
1912	Stedfast	4	Frank Wootton	George Lambton	17th Earl of Derby	2:06.80
1913	Tracery	4	Albert Whalley	John Watson	August Belmont Jr.	2:06.60
1914	Hapsburg	3	Cornelius Foy	William Halsey	Sir Ernest Cassel	
1915	Let Fly	3	Fred Rickaby	Fred Leader	William Hall Walker	
1916	Clarissimus	3	Frank Bullock	William Waugh	7th Viscount Falmouth	
1917	Gay Crusader	3	Steve Donoghue	Alec Taylor Jr.	Alfred W. Cox	
1918	My Dear	3	Steve Donoghue	Alec Taylor Jr.	Alfred W. Cox	
1919	Buchan	3	Jack Brennan	Alec Taylor Jr.	Waldorf Astor	
1920	Orpheus	3	Felix Leach Jr.	Felix Leach	Hugo Cunliffe-Owen	
1921	Orpheus	4	Hector Gray	Felix Leach	Hugo Cunliffe-Owen	2:05.80
1922	Franklin	4	Steve Donoghue	Richard Dawson	5th Earl of Carnarvon	2:07.60
1923	Ellangowan	3	Charlie Elliott	Jack Jarvis	5th Earl of Rosebery	
1924	Pharos	4	Tommy Weston	George Lambton	17th Earl of Derby	2:16.60
1925	Picaroon	3	Frank Bullock	Alec Taylor Jr.	Alexander Robb Cox	2:07.80
1926	Warden of the Marches	4	Joe Childs	Fred Darling	5th Earl of Lonsdale	2:04.00
1927	Asterus	3	Charlie Elliott	Sam Darling	Marcel Boussac	2:09.80
1928	Fairway	3	Tommy Weston	Frank Butters	17th Earl of Derby	
1929	Fairway	4	Tommy Weston	Frank Butters	17th Earl of Derby	2:13.40
1930	Rustom Pasha	3	Harry Wragg	Richard Dawson	Aga Khan III	2:08.60
1931	Goyescas	3	Charlie Elliott	Basil Jarvis	Marcel Boussac	2:05.20
1932	Cameronian	4	Gordon Richards	Fred Darling	John Arthur Dewar	2:05.60
1933 (dh)	Dastur; Chatelaine	4; 3	Michael Beary; Gordon Richards	Frank Butters; Fred Templeman	Aga Khan III; Ernest Thornton-Smith	2:06.80
1934	Umidwar	3	Freddie Fox	Frank Butters	Aga Khan III	2:03.80
1935	Wychwood Abbot	4	Dick Perryman	Ted Leader	O Watney	2:07.80
1936	Wychwood Abbot	5	Dick Perryman	Ted Leader	O Watney	2:10.80
1937	Flares	4	Harry Wragg	Cecil Boyd-Rochfort	William Woodward Sr.	2:14.60
1938	Rockfel	3	Harry Wragg	Ossie Bell	Hugo Cunliffe-Owen	2:05.80
1940	Hippius	3	Eph Smith	Jack Jarvis	6th Earl of Rosebery	2:10.40
1941	Hippius	4	Eph Smith	Jack Jarvis	6th Earl of Rosebery	2:10.80
1942	Big Game	3	Gordon Richards	Fred Darling	King George VI	2:08.20
1943	Nasrullah	3	Gordon Richards	Frank Butters	Aga Khan III	2:06.40
1944	Hycilla	3	Billy Nevett	Cecil Boyd-Rochfort	William Woodward Sr.	2:04.60
1945	Court Martial	3	Cliff Richards	Joe Lawson	2nd Viscount Astor	2:13.80
1946	Honeyway	5	Eph Smith	Jack Jarvis	1st Baron Milford	2:07.00
1947	Migoli	3	Gordon Richards	Frank Butters	Aga Khan III	2:04.20
1948	Solar Slipper	3	Eph Smith	F Smyth	Joseph McGrath	2:05.00
1949	Djeddah	4	Charlie Elliott	Charles Semblat	Marcel Boussac	2:09.20
1950	Peter Flower	4	Bill Rickaby	Jack Jarvis	6th Earl of Rosebery	2:06.60
1951	Dynamiter	3	Charlie Elliott	Charles Semblat	Marcel Boussac	2:06.80
1952	Dynamiter	4	Charlie Elliott	J Glynn	Marcel Boussac	2:08.60
1953	Nearula	3	Edgar Britt	Charles Elsey	William Humble	2:09.09
1954	Narrator	3	Frank Barlow	Humphrey Cottrill	Major L B Holliday	2:06.20
1955	Hafiz	3	Roger Poincelet	Alec Head	Aga Khan III	2:15.64
1956	Hugh Lupus	4	Rae Johnstone	Noel Murless	Lady Vernon	2:08.66
1957	Rose Royale	3	Jean Massard	Alec Head	Prince Aly Khan	2:12.36
1958	Bella Paola	3	Guy Lequeux	François Mathet	François Dupré	2:08.72
1959	Petite Etoile	3	Lester Piggott	Noel Murless	Prince Aly Khan	2:30.16
1960	Marguerite Vernaut	3	Enrico Camici	Ugo Penco	Marchesa della Rochetta	2:13.03
1961	Bobar	3	Maxime Garcia	Robert Corme	Mme G Courtois	2:08.53
1962	Arctic Storm	3	Bill Williamson	John Oxx	Mrs E Carroll	2:08.54
1963	Hula Dancer	3	Jean Deforge	Etienne Pollet	Gertrude Widener	2:04.92
1964	Baldric	3	Bill Pyers	Ernest Fellows	Dorothy Jackson	2:04.00
1965	Silly Season	3	Geoff Lewis	Ian Balding	Paul Mellon	2:06.48
1966	Pieces of Eight	3	Lester Piggott	Vincent O'Brien	Comtesse de la Valdene	2:11.08
1967	Reform	3	Scobie Breasley	Sir Gordon Richards	Michael Sobell	2:08.46
1968	Sir Ivor	3	Lester Piggott	Vincent O'Brien	Raymond Guest	2:12.62
1969	Flossy	3	Jean Deforge	François Boutin	Henry Berlin	2:07.06
1970	Lorenzaccio	5	Geoff Lewis	Noel Murless	Charles St George	2:06.80
1971	Brigadier Gerard	3	Joe Mercer	Dick Hern	Jean Hislop	2:17.90
1972	Brigadier Gerard	4	Joe Mercer	Dick Hern	Jean Hislop	2:07.40
1973	Hurry Harriet	3	Jean Cruguet	Paddy Mullins	Malcolm Thorp	2:08.41
1974	Giacometti	3	Lester Piggott	Ryan Price	Charles St George	2:09.30
1975	Rose Bowl	3	Willie Carson	Fulke Johnson Houghton	Jane Engelhard	2:05.24
1976	Vitiges	3	Pat Eddery	Peter Walwyn	Mrs Marc Laloum	2:06.50
1977	Flying Water	4	Yves Saint-Martin	Angel Penna	Daniel Wildenstein	2:06.80
1978	Swiss Maid	3	Greville Starkey	Paul Kelleway	Max Fine	2:03.80
1979	Northern Baby	3	Philippe Paquet	François Boutin	Anne-Marie d'Estainville	2:03.95
1980	Cairn Rouge	3	Tony Murray	Michael Cunningham	D. Brady	2:05.73
1981	Vayrann	3	Yves Saint-Martin	François Mathet	HH Aga Khan IV	2:08.50
1982	Time Charter	3	Billy Newnes	Henry Candy	Robert Barnett	2:10.76
1983	Cormorant Wood	3	Steve Cauthen	Barry Hills	Bobby McAlpine	2:07.95
1984	Palace Music	3	Yves Saint-Martin	Patrick Biancone	Nelson Bunker Hunt	2:01.04
1985	Pebbles	4	Pat Eddery	Clive Brittain	Sheikh Mohammed	2:04.79
1986	Triptych	4	Tony Cruz	Patrick Biancone	Alan Clore	2:09.49
1987	Triptych	5	Tony Cruz	Patrick Biancone	Alan Clore	2:10.98
1988	Indian Skimmer	4	Michael Roberts	Henry Cecil	Sheikh Mohammed	2:10.51
1989	Legal Case	3	Ray Cochrane	Luca Cumani	Sir Gordon White	2:02.95
1990	In the Groove	3	Steve Cauthen	David Elsworth	Brian Cooper	2:05.67
1991	Tel Quel	3	Thierry Jarnet	André Fabre	Sheikh Mohammed	2:01.93
1992	Rodrigo de Triano	3	Lester Piggott	Peter Chapple-Hyam	Robert Sangster	2:02.46
1993	Hatoof	4	Walter Swinburn	Criquette Head	Maktoum Al Maktoum	2:06.80
1994	Dernier Empereur	4	Sylvain Guillot	André Fabre	Gary Tanaka	2:05.65
1995	Spectrum	3	John Reid	Peter Chapple-Hyam	Lord Weinstock	2:02.55
1996	Bosra Sham	3	Pat Eddery	Henry Cecil	Wafic Saïd	2:03.71
1997	Pilsudski	5	Michael Kinane	Michael Stoute	Lord Weinstock	2:05.46
1998	Alborada	3	George Duffield	Sir Mark Prescott	Kirsten Rausing	2:03.69
1999	Alborada	4	George Duffield	Sir Mark Prescott	Kirsten Rausing	2:05.57
2000	Kalanisi	4	Johnny Murtagh	Sir Michael Stoute	HH Aga Khan IV	2:05.59
2001	Nayef	3	Richard Hills	Marcus Tregoning	Hamdan Al Maktoum	2:07.72
2002	Storming Home	4	Michael Hills	Barry Hills	Maktoum Al Maktoum	2:01.42
2003	Rakti	4	Philip Robinson	Michael Jarvis	Gary Tanaka	2:03.34
2004	Haafhd	3	Richard Hills	Barry Hills	Hamdan Al Maktoum	2:06.90
2005	David Junior	3	Jamie Spencer	Brian Meehan	Roldvale Ltd	2:05.43
2006	Pride	6	Christophe Lemaire	Alain de Royer-Dupré	NP Bloodstock Ltd	2:06.81
2007	Literato	3	Christophe Lemaire	Jean-Claude Rouget	Hervé Morin	2:04.24
2008	New Approach	3	Kevin Manning	Jim Bolger	Princess Haya of Jordan	2:00.13
2009	Twice Over	4	Tom Queally	Henry Cecil	Khalid Abdullah	2:01.31
2010	Twice Over	5	Tom Queally	Henry Cecil	Khalid Abdullah	2:08.54
2011	Cirrus des Aigles	5	Christophe Soumillon	Corine Barande-Barbe	Jean-Claude Dupouy	2:02.52
2012	Frankel	4	Tom Queally	Sir Henry Cecil	Khalid Abdullah	2:10.22
2013	Farhh	5	Silvestre de Sousa	Saeed bin Suroor	Godolphin Racing	2:12.02
2014	Noble Mission	5	James Doyle	Jane Cecil	Khalid Abdullah	2:11.23
2015	Fascinating Rock	4	Pat Smullen	Dermot Weld	Newtown Anner Stud Farm	2:06.31
2016	Almanzor	3	Christophe Soumillon	Jean-Claude Rouget	Ecurie Antonio Caro	2:05.94
2017	Cracksman	3	Frankie Dettori	John Gosden	Anthony Oppenheimer	2:11.75
2018	Cracksman	4	Frankie Dettori	John Gosden	Anthony Oppenheimer	2:08.79
2019 (Note: The 2019, 2023 and 2024 editions were held on Ascot's inner course over 1 mile and 2 furlongs)	Magical	4	Donnacha O'Brien	Aidan O'Brien	Smith / Magnier / Tabor	2:08.42
2020	Addeybb	6	Tom Marquand	William Haggas	Sheikh Ahmed al Maktoum	2:12.29
2021	Sealiway	3	Mickael Barzalona	Cedric Rossi	Le Haras De La Gousserie	2:08.31
2022	Bay Bridge	4	Richard Kingscote	Sir Michael Stoute	James Wigan & Ballylinch Stud	2:09.46
2023	King of Steel	3	Frankie Dettori	Roger Varian	Amo Racing Limited	2:08.42
2024	Anmaat	6	Jim Crowley	Owen Burrows	Shadwell Estate Company Ltd	2:08.96
2025	Calandagan	4	Mickael Barzalona	Francis-Henri Graffard	Aga Khan Studs	2:03.19
2026	Ombudsman	5	William Buick	John & Thady Gosden	Godolphin Racing	2:04.22

== See also ==
- Horse racing in Great Britain
- List of British flat horse races
