= My Dear (British horse) =

British-bred Thoroughbred racehorse

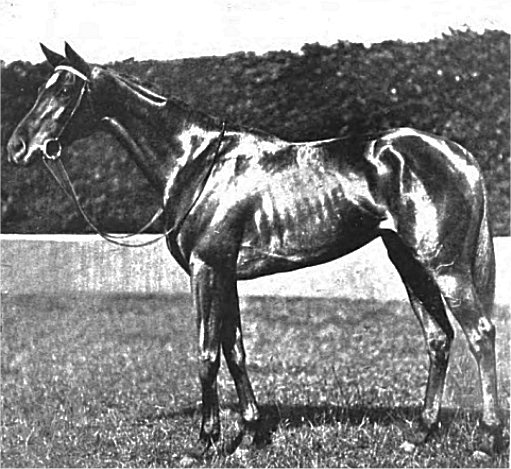
- Sire: Beppo
- Grandsire: Marco
- Dam: Silesia
- Damsire: Spearmint
- Sex: Mare
- Foaled: 1915
- Country: United Kingdom of Great Britain and Ireland
- Colour: Bay
- Breeder: Alfred W. Cox
- Owner: Alfred W. Cox
- Trainer: Alec Taylor, Jr.
- Record: 8: 6–2–0 (incomplete)

Major wins
- Dewhurst Stakes (1917); Oaks Stakes (1918); Champion Stakes (1918); Lowther Stakes (1918); Liverpool Autumn Cup (1918)

My Dear (1915 – 1933) was a British Thoroughbred racehorse and broodmare. In 1917 she showed top-class form, winning both her races including the prestigious Dewhurst Stakes. In the following year she finished second in the 1000 Guineas and was then awarded the New Oak Stakes on the disqualification of Stony Ford. She went on to win the Champion Stakes, Lowther Stakes and Liverpool Autumn Cup as well as finishing second in the wartime substitute St Leger. She was not a great success as a broodmare but did produce at least two winners before her death in 1933.

== Background ==
My Dear was a bay mare bred in England by her owner Alfred W. Cox who raced his horses under the name of "Mr Fairie". The filly was sent into training with by Alec Taylor, Jr. at Manton, Wiltshire. She was ridden to her biggest successes by Steve Donoghue.

She was sired by Beppo, a male-line descendant of the Godolphin Arabian, who won the Jockey Club Stakes and Hardwicke Stakes as well as finishing third in the 1906 running of the St Leger. As a breeding stallion, the best of his other offspring were Picaroon and the Ascot Gold Cup winner Aleppo. My Dear's dam Silesia was a daughter of the outstanding broodmare Galicia, making her a half-sister to both Bayardo and Lemberg.

My Dear's racing career took place during World War I. Many racecourses were closed for the duration of the conflict and all five of traditional British Classic Races were run at Newmarket.

== Racing career ==
=== 1917: two-year-old season ===
My Dear was one of the best juvenile fillies of 1917 in England. She began her career with a "stylish" victory in the Banham Plate. In the autumn she started at odds of 11/10 and "romped home" from male opposition to win the Dewhurst Stakes over seven furlongs at Newmarket.

=== 1918: three-year-old season ===
The 1918 edition of the 1000 Guineas on 1 May attracted eight runners but the only serious contenders appeared to be My Dear and the Middle Park Stakes winner Benevente, who was slightly preferred in the betting. My Dear tracked her rival before going to the front at half way but was then overtaken by Lord Derby's Ferry a 50/1 outsider and finished second, beaten two lengths.

Ferry and Benevente were again in opposition when My Dear started 3/1 favourite for the 140th running of the Oaks Stakes (officially the New Oaks Stakes) at Newmarket on 6 June, with the best of the other runners appearing to be Zinovia, Stony Ford and White Squall. Entering the last half mile Stony Ford led from My Dear with the pair several lengths clear of their rivals. When her jockey began to use his whip, Stony Ford veered sharply across the track, bumping the favourite who lost three lengths as a result. My Dear rallied strongly but was hampered for a second time as Stony Ford hung badly to the right in the closing stages. Stony Ford finished a length in front but Donoghue immediately lodged an objection and there was little surprise when the racecourse stewards disqualified the winner and awarded the race to My Dear. Ferry and Silver Bullet, who had dead-heated for third, were promoted to joint-second place.

My Dear returned for a successful autumn campaign. In September at Newmarket, she finished second to her stablemate Gainsborough, winner of the 2000 Guineas and Derby in the September Stakes, a wartime substitute for the St Leger. At the same track on 15 October she started 11/10 favourite for the Champion Stakes over ten furlongs and won "easily" from the Derby runner-up Dansellon, with Diadem in third place. Later at the same meeting she won the Lowther Stakes (not the current race of the same name) over fourteen furlongs. Before the end of the season she added a victory in the Autumn Cup at Liverpool.

== Assessment and honours ==
In their book, A Century of Champions, based on the Timeform rating system, John Randall and Tony Morris rated My Dear an "average" winner of the Oaks and the best three-year-old filly of 1918 in Britain.

== Breeding record ==
My Dear was retired from racing to become a broodmare. She produced at least two winners:

- Caravel, a bay colt, foaled in 1921, sired by Cicero. Won six races.
- Hartford, bay colt, 1925, by Swynford. Winner.

My Dear died in 1933 at the age of 18.

== Pedigree ==
Pedigree of My Dear (GB), bay mare, 1915
Sire Beppo (GB) 1906	Marco; 1892	Barcaldine	Solon
Sire Beppo (GB) 1906	Marco; 1892	Barcaldine	Ballyroe
Sire Beppo (GB) 1906	Marco; 1892	Novitiate	Hermit
Sire Beppo (GB) 1906	Marco; 1892	Novitiate	Retty
Sire Beppo (GB) 1906	Pitti; 1898	St Frusquin	St Simon
Sire Beppo (GB) 1906	Pitti; 1898	St Frusquin	Isabel
Sire Beppo (GB) 1906	Pitti; 1898	Florence	Wisdom
Sire Beppo (GB) 1906	Pitti; 1898	Florence	Enigma
Dam Silesia (GB) 1909	Spearmint; 1903	Carbine	Sterling
Dam Silesia (GB) 1909	Spearmint; 1903	Carbine	Mersey
Dam Silesia (GB) 1909	Spearmint; 1903	Maid of the Mint	Minting
Dam Silesia (GB) 1909	Spearmint; 1903	Maid of the Mint	Warble
Dam Silesia (GB) 1909	Galicia; 1898	Galopin	Vedette
Dam Silesia (GB) 1909	Galicia; 1898	Galopin	Flying Duchess
Dam Silesia (GB) 1909	Galicia; 1898	Isoletta	Isonomy
Dam Silesia (GB) 1909	Galicia; 1898	Isoletta	Lady Muncaster (Family: 10-a)
