= List of United States post office murals in Connecticut =

Following is a list of United States post office murals created in Connecticut between 1934 and 1943.

Location	Mural title	Image	Artist	Date	Notes	NRHP listed
Bridgeport	Bridgeport Manufacturing		Arthur Covey	1936	3 panels	1986
Bridgeport	Stagecoach and Modern Transportation		Robert Lynn Lambdin	1936	3 panels	1986
Clinton	The Post Road in Connecticut		William Meyerowitz	1937	oil on canvas	
East Hartford	The Stop of Hooker's Band in East Hartford before Crossing the River		Alton Tobey	1940	Winner of the 48-State Mural Competition	
Enfield	Thompsonville, Connecticut		Saul Berman	1938	oil on canvas	
Fairfield	Tempura Mutantur et Nos Mutanmur in Illis or Times Change and We Change With Them		Alice Flint	1938	restored in 2013 and moved to Sullivan-Independence Hall	
Greenwich	Old Days in Greenwich		Victoria Hutson Huntley	1939	oil on canvas	1986
Lakeville	Ethan Allen in Forge Making Cannon Balls		George R. Cox	1942		
Madison	Gathering Seaweed from the Sound		William Abbott Cheever	1940		
New Haven	Pursuit of Regicides		Karl Anderson	1939		
New London	Early Morning Cutting-In Aloft		Tom La Farge	1938	6 panels	1986
Norwalk	Past Products of South Norwalk		Kindred McLeary	1941	tempera	1986
Norwalk	Present Products of South Norwalk		Kindred McLeary	1941	tempera	1986
Norwalk	Indians Instructing Pioneers in Forest Lore		Kindred McLeary	1941	tempera	1986
Norwalk	Old Well		Kindred McLeary	1941	destroyed in 1963 renovation	1986
Norwalk	Bays and Oyster Fishing		Kindred McLeary	1941	destroyed in 1963 renovation	1986
Norwalk	Building Norwalk		Arnold Branch	1938		1986
Norwich	Taking Up Arms – 1776		George Kanelous	1940		1986
Portland	Shade Grown Tobacco		Austin Mecklem	1942		
Shelton	River Landscape		Frede Vidar	1940		
Southington	Romance of Southington		Ann Hunt Spencer	1942		
Thomaston	Early Clockmaking		Suzanne McCullough Lucerne McCullough	1939	oil on canvas	
Torrington	Episodes in the Life of John Brown		Arthur Covey	1937		
West Haven	Fording of the West River to Settle West Haven		Elizabeth Shannon Phillips	1938		
Winsted	Lincoln's Arbiter Settles the Winsted Post Office Controversy		Amy Jones	1938	oil on canvas	
