= Picaroon (horse) =

British-bred Thoroughbred racehorse

- Sire: Beppo
- Grandsire: Marco
- Dam: Ciceronnetta
- Damsire: Cicero
- Sex: Colt
- Foaled: 1922
- Country: United Kingdom of Great Britain and Ireland
- Colour: Brown
- Breeder: Alexander Robb Cox
- Owner: Alexander Robb Cox
- Trainer: Alec Taylor, Jr.
- Record: 10: 8-1-0

Major wins
- Imperial Produce Stakes (1924); Middle Park Stakes (1924); Craven Stakes (1925); Kingsclere Plate (1925); Great Foal Stakes (1925); Champion Stakes (1925)

Awards
- Top-rated British two-year-old colt (1922)

Picaroon (1922–1926) was a British Thoroughbred racehorse. He was the leading British two-year-old colt of his generation, winning all three of his races in 1924 including the Imperial Produce Stakes and the Middle Park Stakes recording victories over Manna and Solario in the process. In the following spring he won the Craven Stakes and was favourite for the 2000 Guineas and The Derby but then began to suffer from leg problems which ruled him out of both races. He returned in autumn to finish fourth in the St Leger and then won his last four races including the Champion Stakes. He remained in training in 1926 but his leg problems intensified and he was euthanised at the age of four.

== Background ==
Picaroon was a brown colt bred by his owner Alexander Robb Cox, who inherited his horses from his older brother Alfred W. Cox who raced his horses under the name of “Mr. Fairie”. He was sired by Beppo, a male-line descendant of the Godolphin Arabian, who won the Jockey Club Stakes and Hardwicke Stakes as well as finishing third in the 1906 running of the St Leger. As a breeding stallion, the best of his other offspring were My Dear and the Ascot Gold Cup winner Aleppo. Picaroon was the first foal of dam Ciceronnetta, a high-class racemare who won the Trial Stakes at Royal Ascot in 1919. Ciceronnetta was granddaughter of the broodmare Galicia who produced Alfred Cox's champions Lemberg and Bayardo.

Picaroon was trained by Alec Taylor, Jr. at Manton in Wiltshire.

== Racing career ==
=== 1924: two-year-old season ===
As a two-year-old, Picaroon won all three of his races. On his racecourse debut he won a Rous Memorial Stakes over six furlongs at Goodwood Racecourse. He then defeated Manna in the Imperial Produce Stakes at Kempton Park after which he was described as "a great two-year-old". On 17 October the colt started 1/2 favourite in an eight-runner field for the Middle Park Stakes over six furlongs at Newmarket Racecourse. Before the race he was described as being "rather on the leg and underdeveloped, but a rare mover". Ridden by the Australian jockey Frank Bullock he became unbalanced on the downhill section of the course before producing some "devouring strides" to take the lead in the closing stages and won by one and a half lengths from Solario, with Manna a neck away in third place. He was officially recognised as the best juvenile colt of the season in Britain.

=== 1925: three-year-old season ===
Picaroon began his second season as a leading fancy for The Derby, with his pedigree suggesting that he would be capable of staying the one and a half mile distance. On his three-year-old debut he started favourite for the Craven Stakes at Newmarket in April and won easily from his stablemate Cross Bow with Solario in third. Although he looked impressive before and during the race it was noted that the conformation of his legs was faulty: he had "rough" hocks and inward-turning "toes" which were thought likely to put undue strain on his tendons. Later that month he fell lame and missed the 2000 Guineas, a race for which he was likely to have started favourite. Picaroon failed to recover from his injury (described as a "heel bug" or an "enlarged hock") and was scratched from the Derby. In his absence, both races were won by Manna.

He returned in August for the Duke of York Plate at York Racecourse, for which he started favourite but was beaten by the subsequent Irish St Leger winner Spelthorne. It was noted that he seemed to be unable to extend his right hind leg normally in the pre-race paddock. He then contested the St Leger Stakes at Doncaster Racecourse on 9 September, but appeared to be less than fully fit, being described as "a little slack in his middle". Ridden by Bullock and starting at odds of 7/1, he raced just behind the leaders for most of the way but hung to the left in the straight and finished fourth behind Solario.

Picaroon returned to form at Newbury Racecourse later in September when he started 4/11 favourite for the Kingsclere Plate and won easily by two lengths from the King's colt Runnymede. At Newmarket in October Picaroon again started odds-on favourite when facing four opponents, and produced what was described as a "whirlwind" finish to beat Rufus O'Malley by two lengths. Two weeks later he was matched against the five-year-old Pharos in a two-runner race for the Champion Stakes over ten furlongs at Newmarket and won by half a length from his older rival. He also won the Great Foal Plate at the same meeting.

=== 1926: four-year-old season ===
Picaroon remained in training as a four-year-old and was expected to be one of the season's leading horses. His previous leg problems recurred however, causing his joints to swell to three times their normal size. He was treated at the Royal Veterinary College in London but was euthanised after all attempts at treatment proved ineffective.

== Assessment ==
In the Free Handicap, an official ranking of the best two-year-olds to race in Britain, Picaroon was the top-rated colt of 1924, one pound behind the filly Saucy Sue, who was also trained by Taylor.

Alec Taylor regarded Picaroon as one of the best horses he ever trained. Frank Bullock rated the colt alongside Saucy Sue as one of the two best horses he had ridden.

In their book A Century of Champions, based on a modified version of the Timeform system, John Randall and Tony Morris rated Picaroon the one hundred and forty-seventh best racehorse of twentieth century, the sixty-fifth best horse of the century to have been trained in Britain and Ireland, and the second best horse foaled in 1922 behind Solario.

== Pedigree ==
Pedigree of Picaroon (GB), brown colt, 1922
Sire Beppo (GB) 1903	Marco (GB); 1892	Barcaldine	Solon
Sire Beppo (GB) 1903	Marco (GB); 1892	Barcaldine	Ballyroe
Sire Beppo (GB) 1903	Marco (GB); 1892	Novitiate	Hermit
Sire Beppo (GB) 1903	Marco (GB); 1892	Novitiate	Retty
Sire Beppo (GB) 1903	Pitti (GB); 1898	St Frusquin	St Simon
Sire Beppo (GB) 1903	Pitti (GB); 1898	St Frusquin	Isabel
Sire Beppo (GB) 1903	Pitti (GB); 1898	Florence	Wisdom
Sire Beppo (GB) 1903	Pitti (GB); 1898	Florence	Enigma
Dam Ciceronnetta (GB) 1916	Cicero (GB); 1902	Cyllene	Bona Vista
Dam Ciceronnetta (GB) 1916	Cicero (GB); 1902	Cyllene	Arcadia
Dam Ciceronnetta (GB) 1916	Cicero (GB); 1902	Gas	Ayrshire
Dam Ciceronnetta (GB) 1916	Cicero (GB); 1902	Gas	Illuminata
Dam Ciceronnetta (GB) 1916	Silesia (GB); 1909	Spearmint	Carbine
Dam Ciceronnetta (GB) 1916	Silesia (GB); 1909	Spearmint	Maid of the Mint
Dam Ciceronnetta (GB) 1916	Silesia (GB); 1909	Galicia	Galopin
Dam Ciceronnetta (GB) 1916	Silesia (GB); 1909	Galicia	Isoletta (Family:10-a)
