= Middle Park Stakes =

Flat horse race in Britain

- Class: Group 1
- Location: Rowley Mile; Newmarket, England
- Inaugurated: 1866
- Race type: Flat / Thoroughbred
- Sponsor: Tattersalls
- Website: Newmarket

Race information
- Distance: 6f (1,207 metres)
- Surface: Turf
- Track: Straight
- Qualification: Two-year-old colts
- Weight: 9 st 2 lb
- Purse: £275,000 (2026); 1st: £155,953

Middle Park Stakes
2026
Orthodox	Force Noir	Hell Of A Spin

Previous years
2025
Wise Approach	Brussels	Coppull
2024
Shadow Of Light	Whistlejacket	Dash Dizzy
2023
Vandeek	Task Force	River Tiber
2022
Blackbeard	The Antarctic	Persian Force
2021
Perfect Power	Castle Star	Armor

2020-2011
2020
Supremacy	Lucky Vega	Minzaal
2019
Earthlight	Golden Horde	Summer Sands
2018
Ten Sovereigns	Jash	Rumble Inthejungle
2017
U S Navy Flag	Fleet Review	Cardsharp
2016
The Last Lion	Blue Point	Mehmas
2015
Shalaa	Buratino	Steady Pace
2014
Charming Thought	Ivawood	Muhaarar
2013
Astaire	Hot Streak	Justice Day
2012
Reckless Abandon	Moohaajim	Gale Force Ten
2011
Crusade	Lilbourne Lad	Reply

2010-2001
2010
Dream Ahead	Strong Suit	Approve
2009
Awzaan	Radiohead	Showcasing
2008
Bushranger	Sayif	Huntdown
2007
Dark Angel	Strike The Deal	Tajdeef
2006
Dutch Art	Wi Dud	Captain Marvelous
2005
Amadeus Wolf	Red Clubs	Always Hopeful
2004
Ad Valorem	Rebuttal	Iceman
2003
Balmont	Holborn	Auditorium
2002
Oasis Dream	Tomahawk	Elusive City
2001
Johannesburg	Zipping	Doc Holiday

2000-1991
2000
Minardi	Endless Summer	Red Carpet
1999
Primo Valentino	Fath	Brahms
1998
Lujain	Bertolini	Vision Of Night
1997
Hayil	Carrowkeel	Designer
1996
Bahamian Bounty	Muchea	In Command
1995
Royal Applause	Woodborough	Kahir Almaydan
1994
Fard	Green Perfume	Fallow
1993
First Trump	Owington	Redoubtable
1992
Zieten	Pips Pride	Factual
1991
Rodrigo De Triano	Lion Cavern	River Falls

1990-1988
1990
Lycius	Distinctly North	Majlood
1989
Balla Cove	Rock City	Cordoba
1988
Mon Tresor	Pure Genius	Northern Tryst

The Middle Park Stakes is a Group 1 flat horse race in Great Britain open to two-year-old colts. It is run on the Rowley Mile at Newmarket over a distance of 6 furlongs (1,207 metres), and it is scheduled to take place each year in September.

== History ==
The event was founded by William Blenkiron, and it is named after his stud at Eltham. It was established in 1866, and was initially titled the Middle Park Plate. It was originally open to horses of either gender.

The race was formerly staged during Newmarket's Cambridgeshire Meeting in late September or early October. It was restricted to colts in 1987. It became part of a new fixture called Future Champions Day in 2011.

From 2015, the Middle Park Stakes was moved from Future Champions Day and brought forward two weeks, returning to the Cambridgeshire meeting, to avoid a clash with the similar Dewhurst Stakes.

The Middle Park Stakes was added to the Breeders' Cup Challenge series in 2012. The winner earned an automatic invitation to compete in the Breeders' Cup Juvenile Sprint. The Middle Park Stakes was dropped from the Challenge series when the Juvenile Sprint Stakes was discontinued after the 2012 running.

The leading horses from the Middle Park Stakes sometimes go on to compete in the following season's 2000 Guineas. The first to win both was Prince Charlie (1871–72), and the most recent was Rodrigo de Triano (1991–92).

== Records ==
Leading jockey (6 wins):

- Danny Maher – Minstead (1901), Flotsam (1902), Lesbia (1907), Bayardo (1908), Lemberg (1909), Corcyra (1913)
- Sir Gordon Richards – Medieval Knight (1933), Scottish Union (1937), Khaled (1945), The Cobbler (1947), Abernant (1948), Royal Challenger (1953)
- Lester Piggott – Petingo (1967), Steel Heart (1974), Junius (1978), Mattaboy (1980), Cajun (1981), Diesis (1982)

Leading trainer (7 wins):

- Aidan O'Brien – Minardi (2000), Johannesburg (2001), Ad Valorem (2004), Crusade (2011), US Navy Flag (2017), Ten Sovereigns (2018), Blackbeard (2022)

Leading owner (8 wins) (includes part ownership):

- Susan Magnier - Minardi (2000), Johannesburg (2001), Ad Valorem (2004), Bushranger (2008), Crusade (2011), US Navy Flag (2017), Ten Sovereigns (2018), Blackbeard (2022)

== Winners ==
Year	Winner	Jockey	Trainer	Owner	Time
1866	The Rake	J Loates	Joseph Dawson	F Pryor
1867	Green Sleeve	Samuel Kenyon	John Porter	Sir Joseph Hawley
1868	Pero Gomez	Jimmy Adams	John Porter	Sir Joseph Hawley
1869	Frivolity‡	Tom Chaloner	Joseph Dawson	W A Lyndon
1870	Albert Victor	John Morris	Tom Olliver	W S Cartwight
1871	Prince Charlie	William Hunt	Joseph Dawson	Joseph Dawson
1872	Surinam	John Osborne	Charles Peck	Sir R W Bulkeley
1873	Newry	Fred Webb		F Fisher
1874	Plebeian	Sam Mordan		R Christophers
1875	Petrarch	Jem Goater	John Dawson	Mr. Spencer
1876	Chamant	Jem Goater	Thomas Jennings	Frederic de Lagrange
1877	Beauclerc	James Snowden	William I'Anson	C Perkins
1878	Peter	Charles Wood	Joseph Dawson	J Peel
1879	Beaudesert	George Fordham	John Day	3rd Marquess of Anglesey
1880	St Louis	George Fordham	Alec Taylor Sr.	W S Crawfurd
1881	Kermesse‡	Tom Cannon Sr.	Joseph Cannon	5th Earl of Rosebery
1882	Macheath	Charles Wood	R Sherrard	W S Crawfurd
1883	Busybody‡	Fred Archer	Mathew Dawson	6th Viscount Falmouth
1884	Melton	Fred Archer	Mathew Dawson	20th Baron Hastings
1885	Minting	Fred Archer	Mathew Dawson	Robert Charles de Grey Vyner
1886	Florentine	John Watts	James Jewitt	5th Baron Calthorpe
1887	Friar's Balsam	George Barrett	John Porter	Frederick Johnstone
1888	Donovan	Fred Barrett	George Dawson	6th Duke of Portland
1889	Signorina‡	George Barrett	Odorado Ginistrelli	Odorado Ginistrelli
1890	Gouverneur	James Woodburn	Tom Jennings Jr	Edmond Blanc
1891	Orme	George Barrett	John Porter	1st Duke of Westminster
1892	Isinglass	George Chaloner	James Jewitt	Harry McCalmont
1893	Ladas	Alfred White	Mathew Dawson	5th Earl of Rosebery
1894	Speedwell	Fred Pratt	James Ryan	Alfred W Cox
1895	St. Frusquin	Fred Pratt	Alfred Hayhoe	Leopold de Rothschild
1896	Galtee More	Mornington Cannon	Sam Darling	John Gubbins
1897	Dieudonne	Otto Madden	Richard Marsh	8th Duke of Devonshire
1898	Caiman	Tod Sloan	John Huggins	Lord William Beresford	1:18.80
1899	Democrat	Tod Sloan	John Huggins	Lord William Beresford
1900	Floriform	Mornington Cannon	Tom Cannon Jr.	T S Jay	1:14.80
1901	Minstead	Danny Maher	George Chaloner	5th Earl of Harewood	1:19.40
1902	Flotsam	Danny Maher	George Blackwell	Sir Daniel Cooper	1:12.20
1903	Pretty Polly	William Lane	Peter Gilpin	Eustace Loder
1904	Jardy	Georges Stern	Robert Denman	Edmond Blanc
1905	Flair‡	William Higgs	Peter Gilpin	Sir Daniel Cooper
1906	Galvani	Bernard Dillon	Peter Gilpin	Eustace Loder	1:13.40
1907	Lesbia‡	Danny Maher	George Blackwell	Sir Daniel Cooper
1908	Bayardo	Danny Maher	Alec Taylor Jr.	Alfred W Cox
1909	Lemberg	Danny Maher	Alec Taylor Jr.	Alfred W Cox	1:14.80
1910	Borrow	Skeets Martin	A. Jack Joyner	Harry Payne Whitney
1911	Absurd	Skeets Martin	Charles Morton	Jack Barnato Joel	1:16.00
1912	Craganour	William Saxby	Jack Robinson	Charles Bower Ismay	1:13.60
1913	Corcyra	Danny Maher	Captain Robert Dewhurst	6th Marquess of Londonderry	1:15.60
1914	Friar Marcus	Herbert Jones	Richard Marsh	King George V	1:15.40
1915	Argos	Walter Griggs	Peter Gilpin	Ludwig Neumann
1916	North Star	Frank Bullock	Reg Day	Jack Barnato Joel	1:16.80
1917	Benevente‡	Fred Rickaby	Captain Robert Dewhurst	6th Marquess of Londonderry
1918	Stefan the Great	Brownie Carslake	Atty Persse	L Robinson
1919	Tetratema	Brownie Carslake	Atty Persse	Dermot McCalmont	1:13.00
1920	Monarch	Frank Bullock	Walter Griggs	Sir H Bird	1:13.60
1921	Golden Corn‡	Steve Donoghue	Hugh Powney	Marshall Field	1:13.40
1922	Drake	Michael Beary	Harry Cottrill	Mrs S Whitburn	1:14.60
1923	Diophon	George Hulme	Richard Dawson	Aga Khan III	1:13.80
1924	Picaroon	Frank Bullock	Alec Taylor Jr.	Alexander Robb Cox	1:15.00
1925	Lex	Michael Beary	Reg Day	Abe Bailey	1:16.40
1926	Call Boy	Charlie Elliott	Jack Watts	Frank Curzon	1:15.60
1927	Pharamond	Tommy Weston	George Lambton	17th Earl of Derby	1:14.80
1928	Costaki Pasha	Michael Beary	Richard Dawson	Aga Khan III	1:16.20
1929	Press Gang	Freddie Fox	Fred Darling	Lord Woolavington	1:13.40
1930	Portlaw	Harry Beasley	Atty Persse	Abe Bailey	1:12.00
1931	the Golden Hair colt	Bobby Jones	Joseph Lawson	Washington Singer	1:14.20
1932	Felicitation	Michael Beary	Frank Butters	Aga Khan III	1:16.00
1933	Medieval Knight	Gordon Richards	Fred Darling	John Arthur Dewar	1:12.20
1934	Bahram	Freddie Fox	Frank Butters	Aga Khan III	1:11.40
1935	Abjer	Charlie Elliott	George Lambton	Marcel Boussac	1:14.40
1936	Fair Copy	Dick Perryman	Colledge Leader	17th Earl of Derby	1:12.80
1937	Scottish Union	Gordon Richards	Noel Cannon	James V. Rank	1:13.20
1938	Foxbrough	Rufus Beasley	Cecil Boyd-Rochfort	William Woodward Sr.	1:15.00
1939	Djebel	Charlie Elliott	Albert Swann	Marcel Boussac	1:17.40
1940 (Note: The 1940 running took place at Nottingham)	Hyacinthus	Rufus Beasley	Atty Persse	A Bassett	1:18.20
1941	Sun Chariot‡	Harry Wragg	Fred Darling	King George VI	1:18.40
1942	Ribbon‡	Eph Smith	Jack Jarvis	6th Earl of Rosebery	1:13.80
1943	Orestes	Tommy Carey	Walter Nightingall	Dorothy Paget	1:15.00
1944	Dante	Billy Nevett	Matthew Peacock	Sir Eric Ohlson	1:15.40
1945	Khaled	Gordon Richards	Frank Butters	Aga Khan III	1:13.00
1946	Saravan	Charlie Elliott	Frank Butters	Aly Khan	1:15.20
1947	The Cobbler	Gordon Richards	Fred Darling	Giles Loder
1948	Abernant	Gordon Richards	Noel Murless	Reginald Macdonald-Buchanan	1:13.80
1949	Masked Light	Doug Smith	Norman Scobie	E Wanless	1:14.60
1950	Big Dipper	Harry Carr	Cecil Boyd-Rochfort	Mrs J Brice	1:14.20
1951	King's Bench	Charlie Elliott	Matthew Feakes	A Thompsett	1:12.20
1952	Nearula	Edgar Britt	Charles Elsey	William Humble	1:15.55
1953	Royal Challenger	Gordon Richards	Rufus Beasley	A Gordon	1:16.32
1954	Our Babu	Doug Smith	Geoffrey Brooke	David Robinson	1:13.36
1955	Buisson Ardent	Doug Smith	Alec Head	Aga Khan III	1:15.22
1956	Pipe of Peace	Scobie Breasley	Sir Gordon Richards	Stavros Niarchos	1:14.44
1957	Major Portion	Eph Smith	Ted Leader	Jim Joel	1:14.72
1958	Masham	Doug Smith	Geoffrey Brooke	A Ellis	1:18.55
1959	Venture	George Moore	Alec Head	Aly Khan	1:15.80
1960	Skymaster	Scobie Breasley	Bill Smyth	16th Duke of Norfolk	1:16.45
1961	Gustav	Jimmy Lindley	Jeremy Tree	Jock Whitney	1:13.86
1962	Crocket	Eph Smith	Geoffrey Brooke	D van Clief	1:13.67
1963	Showdown	Doug Smith	Fred Winter	Mrs D Prenn	1:13.24
1964	Spanish Express	Joe Mercer	L Hall	Mrs G Marcow	1:14.54
1965	Track Spare	Jimmy Lindley	Ronald Mason	Ronald Mason	1:15.84
1966	Bold Lad	Des Lake	Paddy Prendergast	Lady Granard	1:13.96
1967	Petingo	Lester Piggott	Sam Armstrong	Marcos Lemos	1:13.30
1968	Right Tack	Geoff Lewis	John Sutcliffe	J R Brown	1:17.26
1969	Huntercombe	Ernie Johnson	Arthur Budgett	Horace Renshaw	1:11.35
1970	Brigadier Gerard	Joe Mercer	Dick Hern	Jean Hislop	1:15.11
1971	Sharpen Up	Willie Carson	Bernard van Cutsem	Mimi van Cutsem	1:13.66
1972	Tudenham	Jimmy Lindley	Denys Smith	Lionel Brook Holliday	1:15.29
1973	Habat	Pat Eddery	Peter Walwyn	Carlo Vittadini	1:13.72
1974	Steel Heart	Lester Piggott	Dermot Weld	Ravi Tikkoo	1:15.74
1975	Hittite Glory	Frankie Durr	Scobie Breasley	Ravi Tikkoo	1:17.41
1976	Tachypous	Geoff Lewis	Bruce Hobbs	George Cambanis	1:16.29
1977	Formidable	Pat Eddery	Peter Walwyn	Peter Goulandris	1:11.22
1978	Junius	Lester Piggott	Vincent O'Brien	Simon Fraser	1:11.04
1979	Known Fact	Willie Carson	Jeremy Tree	Khalid Abdullah	1:13.27
1980	Mattaboy	Lester Piggott	Robert Armstrong	Ravi Tikkoo	1:11.37
1981	Cajun	Lester Piggott	Henry Cecil	James Stone	1:16.49
1982	Diesis	Lester Piggott	Henry Cecil	Lord Howard de Walden	1:13.36
1983	Creag-An-Sgor	Steve Cauthen	Charlie Nelson	Mrs W. Tulloch	1:13.24
1984	Bassenthwaite	Pat Eddery	Jeremy Tree	Stavros Niarchos	1:13.58
1985	Stalker	Joe Mercer	Peter Walwyn	Paddy Fetherston-Godley	1:12.12
1986	Mister Majestic	Ray Cochrane	Robert Williams	David Johnson	1:13.75
1987	Gallic League	Steve Cauthen	Barry Hills	Robert Sangster	1:13.95
1988	Mon Tresor	Michael Roberts	Ron Boss	Pam Fitsall	1:12.27
1989	Balla Cove	Steve Cauthen	Ron Boss	Harvey Cohen	1:11.04
1990	Lycius	Cash Asmussen	André Fabre	Sheikh Mohammed	1:10.14
1991	Rodrigo de Triano	Willie Carson	Peter Chapple-Hyam	Robert Sangster	1:11.11
1992	Zieten	Steve Cauthen	André Fabre	Sheikh Mohammed	1:11.28
1993	First Trump	Michael Hills	Geoff Wragg	Mollers Racing	1:13.74
1994	Fard	Willie Carson	David Morley	Hamdan Al Maktoum	1:11.36
1995	Royal Applause	Walter Swinburn	Barry Hills	Maktoum Al Maktoum	1:11.14
1996	Bahamian Bounty	Frankie Dettori	David Loder	Maktoum Al Maktoum	1:11.95
1997	Hayil	Richard Hills	David Morley	Hamdan Al Maktoum	1:12.39
1998	Lujain	Frankie Dettori	David Loder	Sheikh Mohammed	1:14.74
1999 (Note: The 1999 race was run on the July Course at Newmarket)	Primo Valentino	Pat Eddery	Peter Harris	Primo Donnas	1:12.83
2000	Minardi	Michael Kinane	Aidan O'Brien	Tabor / Magnier	1:12.75
2001	Johannesburg	Michael Kinane	Aidan O'Brien	Tabor / Magnier	1:11.73
2002	Oasis Dream	Jimmy Fortune	John Gosden	Khalid Abdullah	1:09.61
2003	Balmont (Note: Three Valleys finished first in 2003, but he was subsequently disqualified after testing positive for a banned substance)	Pat Eddery	Jeremy Noseda	Sanford Robertson	1:10.68
2004	Ad Valorem	Jamie Spencer	Aidan O'Brien	Sue Magnier	1:12.19
2005	Amadeus Wolf	Neil Callan	Kevin Ryan	Duddy / McDonald	1:12.36
2006	Dutch Art	Frankie Dettori	Peter Chapple-Hyam	Susan Roy	1:14.07
2007	Dark Angel	Michael Hills	Barry Hills	Corbett / Wright	1:12.08
2008	Bushranger	Johnny Murtagh	David Wachman	Smith / Magnier / Tabor	1:09.56
2009	Awzaan	Richard Hills	Mark Johnston	Hamdan Al Maktoum	1:10.11
2010	Dream Ahead	William Buick	David Simcock	Khalifa Dasmal	1:14.28
2011	Crusade	Seamie Heffernan	Aidan O'Brien	Tabor / Smith / Magnier	1:10.75
2012	Reckless Abandon	Gérald Mossé	Clive Cox	Deadman / Barrow	1:11.06
2013	Astaire	Neil Callan	Kevin Ryan	Angie Bailey	1:12.33
2014	Charming Thought	William Buick	Charlie Appleby	Godolphin	1:13.01
2015	Shalaa	Frankie Dettori	John Gosden	Al Shaqab Racing	1:11.92
2016	The Last Lion	Joe Fanning	Mark Johnston	John Brown & Megan Dennis	1:12.13
2017	U S Navy Flag	Seamie Heffernan	Aidan O'Brien	Tabor / Smith / Magnier	1:12.44
2018	Ten Sovereigns	Donnacha O'Brien	Aidan O'Brien	Smith / Magnier / Tabor	1:10.04
2019	Earthlight	Mickael Barzalona	André Fabre	Godolphin	1:09.31
2020	Supremacy	Adam Kirby	Clive Cox	Jason Goddard	1:09.73
2021	Perfect Power	Christophe Soumillon	Richard Fahey	Sheikh Rashid Dalmook Al Maktoum	1:11.32
2022	Blackbeard	Ryan Moore	Aidan O'Brien	Derrick Smith, Magnier, Tabor & Westerberg	1:12.02
2023	Vandeek	James Doyle	Simon & Ed Crisford	KHK Racing Ltd	1:10.76
2024	Shadow Of Light	William Buick	Charlie Appleby	Godolphin	1:12.29
2025	Wise Approach	William Buick	Charlie Appleby	Godolphin	1:11.56
2026	Orthodox	Rossa Ryan	Clive Cox	J Goddard	1:09.96

== See also ==
- Horse racing in Great Britain
- List of British flat horse races
- Recurring sporting events established in 1866 – this race is included under its original title, Middle Park Plate.
