= 2013 Champion Stakes =

137th Champion Shakes horse race

- Champion Stakes
- Racing colours of the winner
- Location: Ascot Racecourse
- Date: 19 October 2013
- Winning horse: Farhh
- Starting price: 11/4
- Jockey: Silvestre de Sousa
- Trainer: Saeed bin Suroor
- Owner: Godolphin Racing
- Conditions: Soft

The 2013 Champion Stakes was the 137th running of the Champion Stakes horse race. It was run over one mile and two furlongs at Ascot Racecourse on 19 October 2013.

== Race details ==
- Sponsor: QIPCO
- Winner's prize money: £737,230
- Going: Soft
- Number of runners: 10
- Winner's time: 2 minutes, 12.02 seconds

== Full result ==
| | Dist * | Horse | Jockey | Trainer | SP |
| 1 | | Farhh | Silvestre de Sousa | Saeed bin Suroor | 11/4 |
| 2 | nk | Cirrus des Aigles | Christophe Soumillon | Corine Barande-Barbe | 6/4 fav |
| 3 | ½ | Ruler of the World | Ryan Moore | Aidan O'Brien | 13/2 |
| 4 | 6 | Hunter's Light | Mickael Barzalona | Saeed bin Suroor | 25/1 |
| 5 | ½ | Mukhadram | Paul Hanagan | William Haggas | 14/1 |
| 6 | nk | Hillstar | Richard Hughes | Sir Michael Stoute | 14/1 |
| 7 | 1 | Morandi | Christophe Lemaire | Jean-Claude Rouget | 10/1 |
| 8 | 4½ | Main Sequence | Ted Durcan | David Lanigan | 66/1 |
| 9 | nk | Parish Hall | Kevin Manning | Jim Bolger | 50/1 |
| 10 | 7 | Triple Threat | Maxime Guyon | André Fabre | 20/1 |

* The distances between the horses are shown in lengths

== Winner details ==
Further details of the winner, Farhh:

- Foaled: 4 March 2008, in Great Britain
- Sire: Pivotal; Dam: Gonbarda (Lando)
- Owner: Godolphin Racing
- Breeder: Darley Stud

== Form analysis ==
=== Previous Group 1 wins ===
Group 1 victories prior to running in the 2013 Champion Stakes:

- Farhh – Lockinge Stakes (2013)
- Cirrus des Aigles – Champion Stakes (2011), Dubai Sheema Classic (2012), Prix Ganay (2012)
- Ruler of the World – Epsom Derby (2013)
- Hunter's Light – Premio Roma (2012), Al Maktoum Challenge R3 (2013)
- Morandi – Critérium de Saint-Cloud (2012)
- Parish Hall – Dewhurst Stakes (2011)
