= Farhh =

British Thoroughbred racehorse

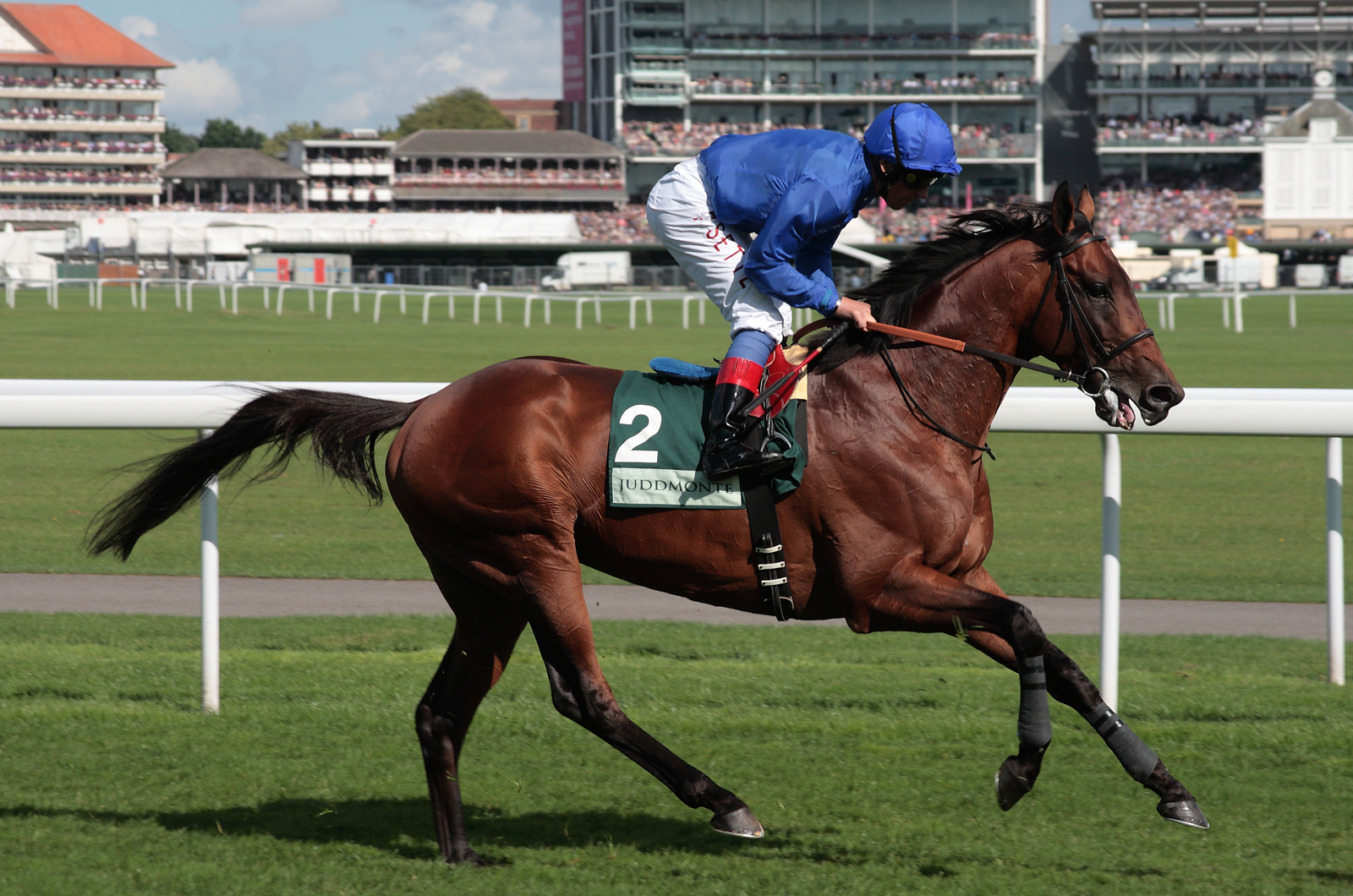
- Farhh ridden by Frankie Dettori at York, 2012
- Sire: Pivotal
- Grandsire: Polar Falcon
- Dam: Gonbarda
- Damsire: Lando
- Sex: Stallion
- Foaled: 4 March 2008
- Country: United Kingdom
- Colour: Bay
- Breeder: Darley Stud
- Owner: Godolphin
- Trainer: Saeed bin Suroor
- Record: 10: 5-4-1

Major wins
- Lockinge Stakes (2013); Champion Stakes (2013)

Farhh (foaled 4 March 2008) is a British Thoroughbred racehorse. His early career was disrupted by injury, and he made only one appearance in each of his first two seasons. As a four-year-old, he established himself as a top-class performer without winning an important race, as he was placed in some of the most prestigious weight-for-age races in Europe, twice finishing second to Frankel. As a five-year-old, he won his first major race when recording an easy victory in the Lockinge Stakes and went on to record his most important success in the Champion Stakes.

== Background ==
Farhh is a bay horse with no white markings bred by the Darley Stud, the breeding arm of Sheikh Mohammed's Godolphin organisation. His sire, Pivotal, was a top-class sprinter who won the King's Stand Stakes and the Nunthorpe Stakes in 1996. He went on to become an "excellent" sire, getting the winners of more than a thousand races across a range of distances, including Sariska, Somnus, Kyllachy (Nunthorpe Stakes) and Excellent Art. Farhh's dam, Gonbarda, was a highly successful racehorse in Germany, winning the Deutschland Preis and the Preis von Europa as a three-year-old in 2005. As a granddaughter of the broodmare Grimpola, she was closely related to the Ascot Gold Cup winner Fame and Glory.

== Racing career ==
=== 2010–2011: early career ===
Farhh made his racecourse debut on 24 July 2010 at Newmarket, with Ted Durcan in the saddle for a seven-furlong maiden race. Starting as the 13/8 joint-favourite in a field of seven, he impressed with a commanding performance, winning by six lengths ahead of Flodden. Farrh was an intended runner in the Frank Whittle Partnership Conditions Stakes at Doncaster on 10 September 2010, where he would have opposed Frankel for the first time, but became worked up in the stalls and was withdrawn before the race started.

After being off the racecourse for fifteen months, Farhh reappeared as a three-year-old in a one-mile handicap race at Newmarket on 29 October 2011. Ridden by Silvestre de Sousa, he carried 125 pounds and won "readily" by 2 1/2 lengths from nineteen opponents.

=== 2012: four-year-old season ===
On his four-year-old debut, Farhh ran in the Thirsk Hunt Cup, over a mile, at Thirsk Racecourse on 5 May, in which he was ridden by Antioco Murgia, claiming 5 pounds. Carrying top weight of 128 pounds he took the lead two furlongs from the finish and accelerated clear of his rivals to win by six lengths.

Farhh was then moved up to the highest level for the Prince of Wales's Stakes at Royal Ascot in June. Ridden for the first time by Frankie Dettori he sustained his first defeat as he finished third of the eleven runners behind So You Think and Carlton House. Seventeen days later, Farhh started favourite for the Eclipse Stakes over ten furlongs at Sandown Park Racecourse. He was restrained by Dettori in the early stages before producing a strong challenge in the straight, but failed by half a length to catch Nathaniel. At Goodwood Racecourse in July, he finished six lengths second to the world's top-rated racehorse Frankel in the Sussex Stakes over one mile. Farhh took on Frankel again in the International Stakes over 10 1/2 furlongs at York. He was beaten seven lengths by the Henry Cecil-trained champion, but got the better of a sustained contest with St Nicholas Abbey for second place. On his final appearance of the season Farhh was sent to France for the Prix du Moulin at Longchamp on 16 September, in which he was beaten a head by the French-trained filly Moonlight Cloud.

=== 2013: five-year-old season ===
Racing silks of Godolphin

Farhh began his fourth season on 18 May 2013 in the Lockinge Stakes over one mile at Newbury Racecourse. Ridden by de Sousa, he took the lead approaching the final furlong and pulled clear to win by four lengths to record his first major victory.

Having picked up a further injury in the weeks following his Lockinge romp, Farhh's next racecourse appearance was the Champion Stakes, run over 10 furlongs, at Ascot on 19 October. Farhh, ridden again by Silvestre de Sousa, started as the 11/4 second favourite for the end-of-season highlight behind French champion Cirrus des Aigles. The 10 horse field also included Ruler Of The World, Mukhadram (Brigadier Gerard Stakes, York Stakes), Hillstar, Main Sequence, Parish Hall, Triple Threat and Hunter's Light. Farhh, under de Sousa, soon took keen hold coming out of stall 5 and tracked early leader Hunter's Light, also owned by Godolphin, in company with Morandi and Triple Threat. After travelling smoothly through the whole race, Farhh took over the running into the home straight, with the move being covered by Christophe Soumillon on 11-time group winner Cirrus Des Aigles. After leading over a furlong out, Farhh was soon under pressure and quickly chased by the seemingly full-of-running Cirrus des Aigles with Ruler Of The World and jockey Ryan Moore challenging from very wide, having come round the whole field. Farhh was pressed by the challengers well into the final furlong and along with Cirrus des Aigles and Ruler Of The World, moved well clear of the rest of the field. However, following a pulsating run to the line, where the three principles were split by no more than a length, Farhh found more on the front end and held off the late challenges to hold on gamely to win by a neck at the finish line from Cirrus Des Aigles on his outside in second and Ruler Of The World (on the outside of Cirrus des Aigles) a half length back in third. At the line there was a clear 6-length gap back to Hunter's Light, who held on for fourth from Mukhadram in fifth who was followed by Hillstar, Morandi, Main Sequence, Parish Hall and Triple Threat. The finishing time was 2 m 12.02s on the soft turf course. In the aftermath, trainer Saeed bin Suroor went on to say: "This horse is a great fighter. He had a break after winning the Lockinge, and he has been a miler in the past, but a mile and a quarter was great for him today on that ground. He was the best horse in the race today. I am very proud of him, and this is good for Godolphin. Every year, he has had problems. Luckily, he has won a pair of Group 1s in his last two races. He is a great horse, and I am so happy. He's been a very tough horse since he was a two-year-old, but we've just had to look after him with a different programme to keep him sound. His last piece of work was brilliant, and the ground was a concern, but he handled it well."

It was announced soon afterwards that Farhh would retire from racing to stand as a stallion at Dalham Hall Stud in Newmarket in 2014. Farhh retired with a record of 5 wins (twice at group 1 level), 4 seconds and a third from 10 career starts and an official rating of 124.

== Assessment ==
In the 2012 edition of the World Thoroughbred Racehorse Rankings Farhh was given a rating of 124, making him the thirteenth best racehorse in the world and the equal of Camelot, Animal Kingdom, Danedream and Bodemeister.

== Stud career ==
Farhh retired to stud for the 2014 breeding season. While he is subfertile, having just 39 runners in Great Britain and Ireland as of May 2019, he has nonetheless had success at stud. Some of his most notable runners include King of Change, Epsom Derby runner-up Dee Ex Bee, Prix Hocquart winner Nocturnal Fox, and group 3 winner Wells Farhh Go.

=== Notable progeny ===
c = colt, f = filly, g = gelding

Foaled	Name	Sex	Major wins
2016	King of Change	c	Queen Elizabeth II Stakes
2019	Fonteyn	f	Sun Chariot Stakes
2019	Tribalist	c	Prix du Moulin de Longchamp
2020	Tiffany	f	Grosser Preis von Berlin
2021	Fairy Glen	f	Prix de Royallieu

== Pedigree ==
Pedigree of Farhh (GB), bay horse, 2008
Sire Pivotal (GB) 1993	Polar Falcon (USA); 1987	Nureyev	Northern Dancer
Sire Pivotal (GB) 1993	Polar Falcon (USA); 1987	Nureyev	Special
Sire Pivotal (GB) 1993	Polar Falcon (USA); 1987	Marie d'Argonne	Jefferson
Sire Pivotal (GB) 1993	Polar Falcon (USA); 1987	Marie d'Argonne	Mohair
Sire Pivotal (GB) 1993	Fearless Revival (GB); 1987	Cozzene	Caro
Sire Pivotal (GB) 1993	Fearless Revival (GB); 1987	Cozzene	Ride The Trails
Sire Pivotal (GB) 1993	Fearless Revival (GB); 1987	Stufida	Bustino
Sire Pivotal (GB) 1993	Fearless Revival (GB); 1987	Stufida	Zerbinetta
Dam Gonbarda (GER) 2002	Lando (GER); 1990	Acatenango	Surumu
Dam Gonbarda (GER) 2002	Lando (GER); 1990	Acatenango	Aggravate
Dam Gonbarda (GER) 2002	Lando (GER); 1990	Laurea	Sharpman
Dam Gonbarda (GER) 2002	Lando (GER); 1990	Laurea	Licata
Dam Gonbarda (GER) 2002	Gonfalon (GB); 1989	Slip Anchor	Shirley Heights
Dam Gonbarda (GER) 2002	Gonfalon (GB); 1989	Slip Anchor	Sayonara
Dam Gonbarda (GER) 2002	Gonfalon (GB); 1989	Grimpola	Windwurf
Dam Gonbarda (GER) 2002	Gonfalon (GB); 1989	Grimpola	Gondel (Family: 1-i)
