= George Cox (cricketer, born 1859) =

English cricketer

Personal information
- Full name: George Robert Cox
- Born: 9 November 1859; Twickenham, Middlesex, England
- Died: 24 February 1936 (aged 76); Hoylake, Cheshire, England
- Batting: Right-handed
- Relatives: Alfred W. Cox (brother); Alexander Robb Cox (brother)

Career statistics
Competition	First-class
Matches	1
Runs scored	0
Batting average	0.00
100s/50s	0/0
Top score	0
Catches/stumpings	0/–
- Source: Cricinfo, 4 October 2015

George Robert Cox (9 November 1859 – 24 February 1936) was an English cricketer who made one appearance in first-class cricket in 1884. He was a right-handed batsman.

Cox made what would be his only appearance in first-class cricket in 1884 when he was selected for the Liverpool and District cricket team against the touring Australians at Aigburth. In a match which the Australians won by 1 wicket, Cox was dismissed for ducks in both Liverpool and District innings, bowled by George Giffen and Joey Palmer in each innings respectively.

He died at Hoylake, Cheshire on 24 February 1936. His brother Alexander Cox was also a first-class cricketer.
