= Theresa Bernstein =

American artist, and writer (1890–2002)

Theresa Bernstein-Meyerowitz
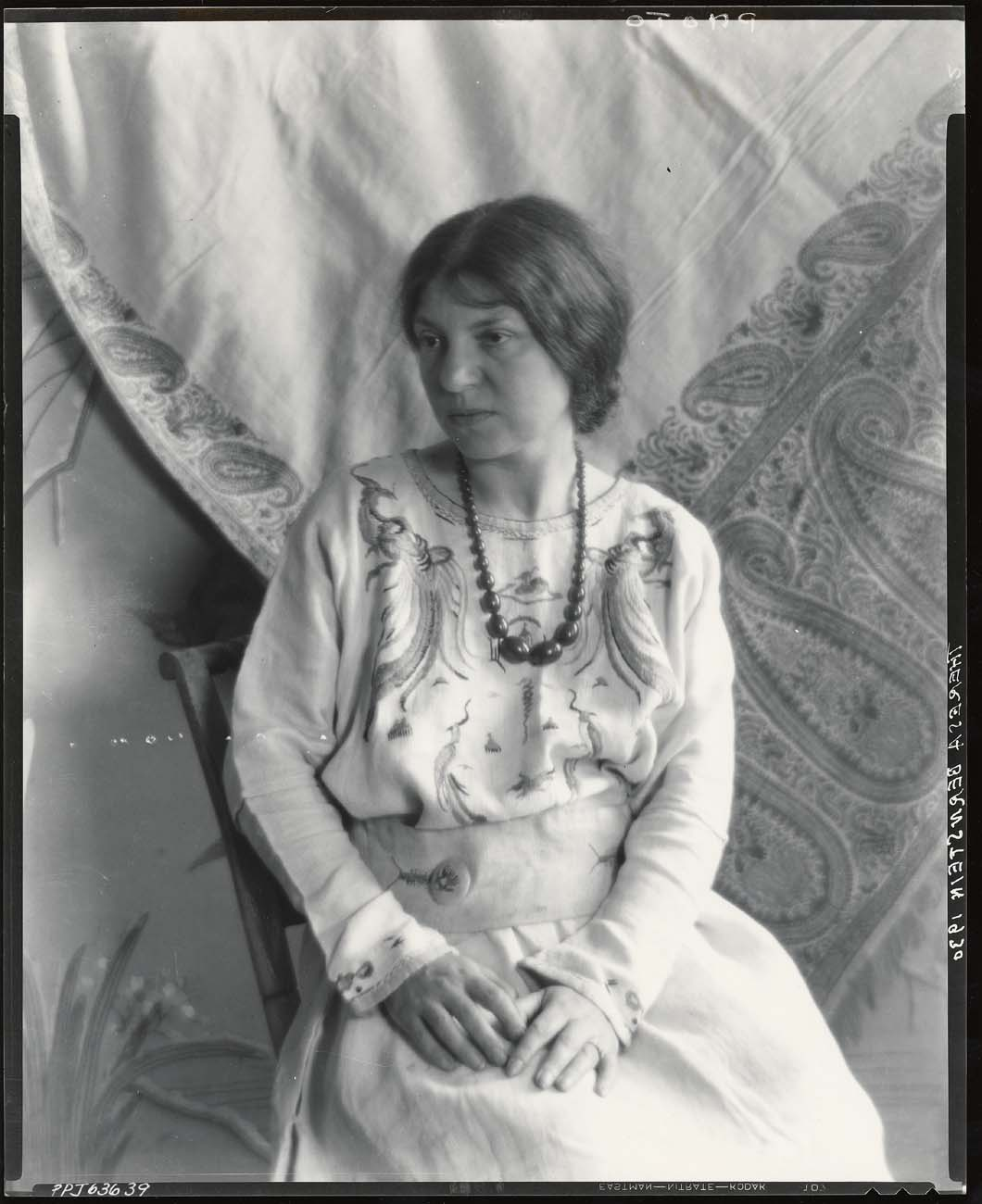
- Theresa Bernstein at age 40 in 1930
- Born: Theresa Ferber Bernstein; March 1, 1890; Kraków, Poland
- Died: February 13, 2002 (aged 111 years, 349 days); New York, New York, U.S.
- Known for: Painting writing
- Movement: Modernism; influenced by Ash Can School
- Spouse: William Meyerowitz

Theresa Ferber Bernstein-Meyerowitz (March 1, 1890 – February 13, 2002) was an American artist, writer, and supercentenarian born in Kraków, in what is now Poland, and raised in Philadelphia. She received her art training in Philadelphia and New York City. Over the course of nearly a century, she produced hundreds of paintings and other artwork, plus several books and journals.

Bernstein and her husband William Meyerowitz, who was also an artist, lived and worked in Manhattan and Gloucester, Massachusetts. She painted portraits and scenes of daily life, plus reflections of the major issues of her time, in a modern style that evolved from realism to expressionism. She was active in several art associations and promoted her husband's work as well as her own. Her artworks are found in dozens of museums and private collections in the United States and abroad. She remained active all her life and was honored with a solo exhibition of 110 art works to celebrate her 110th birthday.

Bernstein also authored several books, including a biography of her husband and a journal about their many trips to Israel.

She died in 2002, just a couple of weeks short of her 112th birthday.

== Biography ==
=== Early life ===
Theresa Ferber Bernstein was born in Kraków, Poland, on March 1, 1890. She was the only child of Isidore Bernstein, a Jewish textile manufacturer, and his wife Anne (née Ferber) Bernstein, an accomplished pianist. The family emigrated to the United States when Theresa was one year old. She showed an early interest in art and began learning to draw and paint at a young age. As a young woman, she traveled several times with her mother to Europe, where she was impressed by artists of the new Expressionist movement like Wassily Kandinsky, Franz Marc, and Edvard Munch.

=== Education ===
Bernstein graduated from the William D. Kelley School in Philadelphia in June 1907, at the age of 17. The same year, she received a scholarship to the Philadelphia School of Design for Women, now Moore College of Art & Design, where she studied with Harriet Sartain, Elliott Daingerfield, Henry B. Snell, Daniel Garber and others. She graduated in 1911 with an award for general achievement (the college awarded her an honorary doctorate in 1992). In 1912, she settled in Manhattan and enrolled at the Art Students League, where she took life and portraiture classes with William Merritt Chase.

=== Marriage and family ===
She met her future husband William Meyerowitz, also an artist, in 1917, and they married in Philadelphia on February 7, 1919. Their only child, a girl named Isadora, died in infancy. They lived in New York City and began spending summers in Gloucester, Massachusetts in the 1920s. In 1923, the couple traveled abroad together.

In the beginning, Bernstein's sales and reviews were far better than her husband's, but over time, her reputation waned due to a decreased interest in realistic subjects, even though they presented themselves as a "painting couple." During the Great Depression, Bernstein and her husband continued to teach in their studios in Manhattan and Gloucester and sold graphics to supplement their income. They became involved in the Zionist movement, and after the establishment of the State of Israel, they visited the country 13 times over 30 years. Until her husband's death in 1981, Bernstein promoted his artwork while creating her own. She stated that she did not feel it necessary to compete with him, as she was not competitive by nature.

Bernstein and Meyerowitz were close to two of their nieces, Laura Nyro and Barbara Meyerowitz (aka Barbara DeAngelis), and supported their musical education. Following the death of her husband, Bernstein developed a close relationship with DeAngelis' youngest son, Keith Carlson, who documented their relationship for a website in the artist's name that was created by the City University of New York.

=== Death ===
Bernstein and her husband lived for many decades in a rent-controlled loft-style studio apartment at 54 West 74th Street on the Upper West Side of Manhattan, just one block from Central Park West. This studio was her home at the time of her death on February 12, 2002, at Mount Sinai Hospital, shortly before her 112th birthday.

== Career ==
=== Artistic style and subject matter ===
In 1913, Bernstein attended the Armory Show, the first large exhibition of modern art in America. Bernstein admired the style of Robert Henri, founder of the Ashcan School of American realism, and his way of depicting the everyday drama of the city. She was also influenced by John Sloan, Stuart Davis and others of the movement. According to art historian Gail Levin, Bernstein was for a time more popular than well-known realist Edward Hopper, although Bernstein's style over time tended more toward expressionism. However, unlike abstract artists, Bernstein remained committed to figuration, choosing always to connect with real life and people.

In her paintings, Bernstein depicted the major issues of her time: the women's suffrage movement, World War I, jazz, the plight of immigrants, unemployment, and racial discrimination. She also painted portraits of her husband and other people, including Polish musician and politician Ignacy Jan Paderewski, jazz musician Charlie Parker, and entertainer Judy Garland. Her studio near Bryant Park and Times Square allowed her to paint a cross-section of New Yorkers, using large brushstrokes and bold colors to depict the vitality of her subjects. At Coney Island and later during her summers in Gloucester, she painted harbors, beaches, fish, and still lifes.

Early reviewers praised her "man's vision," while recent scholars have found that she had a "decidedly feminine sensibility." In the male-dominated art world of her time, Bernstein, like many women artists, was frequently overlooked. To try to avoid discrimination, she often signed her works using "T. Bernstein" or just her surname.

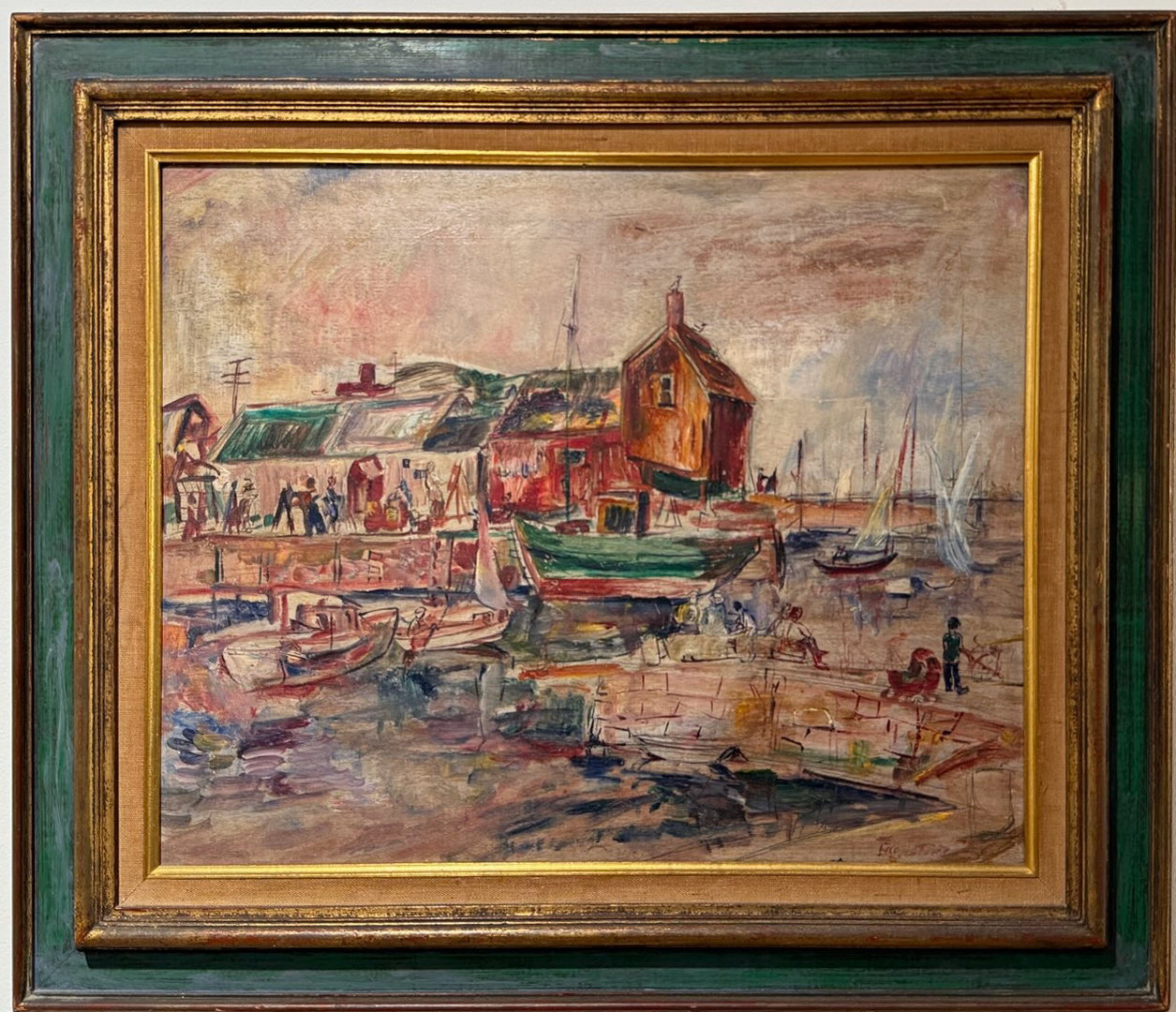
Oil on board painting by Theresa Bernstein, 20" by 16," signed.

=== Associations ===
Bernstein was part of the Philadelphia Ten, an influential group of female artists. She was also a member of the National Association of Women Artists, the Society of American Graphic Artists and the North Shore Art Association. Her works were exhibited extensively with the National Academy of Design and the Society of Independent Artists, which she co-founded.

=== Selected exhibitions ===
- 1919: Bernstein's first solo exhibition at the Milch Gallery in New York City.
- 1930: The Baltimore Museum of Art held simultaneous solo exhibitions for Bernstein and her husband to help them build their individual careers.
- 1990: Echoes of New York: The Paintings of Theresa Bernstein, curated by art historian Michele Cohen, Museum of the City of New York.
- 1998: Theresa Bernstein: A Seventy-Year Retrospective, Joan Whalen Fine Art, New York City
- 2000: Theresa Bernstein: An Early Modernist – Solo exhibition of 110 of Bernstein's art works held to celebrate her 110th birthday and attended by the artist, Jo-An Fine Art in New York City.
- 2003: Theresa Bernstein: An Early Modernist – Solo exhibition a year after her death, showcasing paintings from the Martin and Edith Stein Collection, curated by Wendy Blazier and attended by Martin and Edith Stein, Boca Raton Museum of Art in Boca Raton, Florida.
- 2014: Theresa Bernstein: A Century in Art: Retrospective exhibition of 44 of her works from public and private collections, organized by art historian Gail Levin, Franklin & Marshall College in Lancaster, Pennsylvania.

In all, Bernstein had more than 40 solo exhibitions over her lifetime.

== Legacy ==
=== Visual arts ===
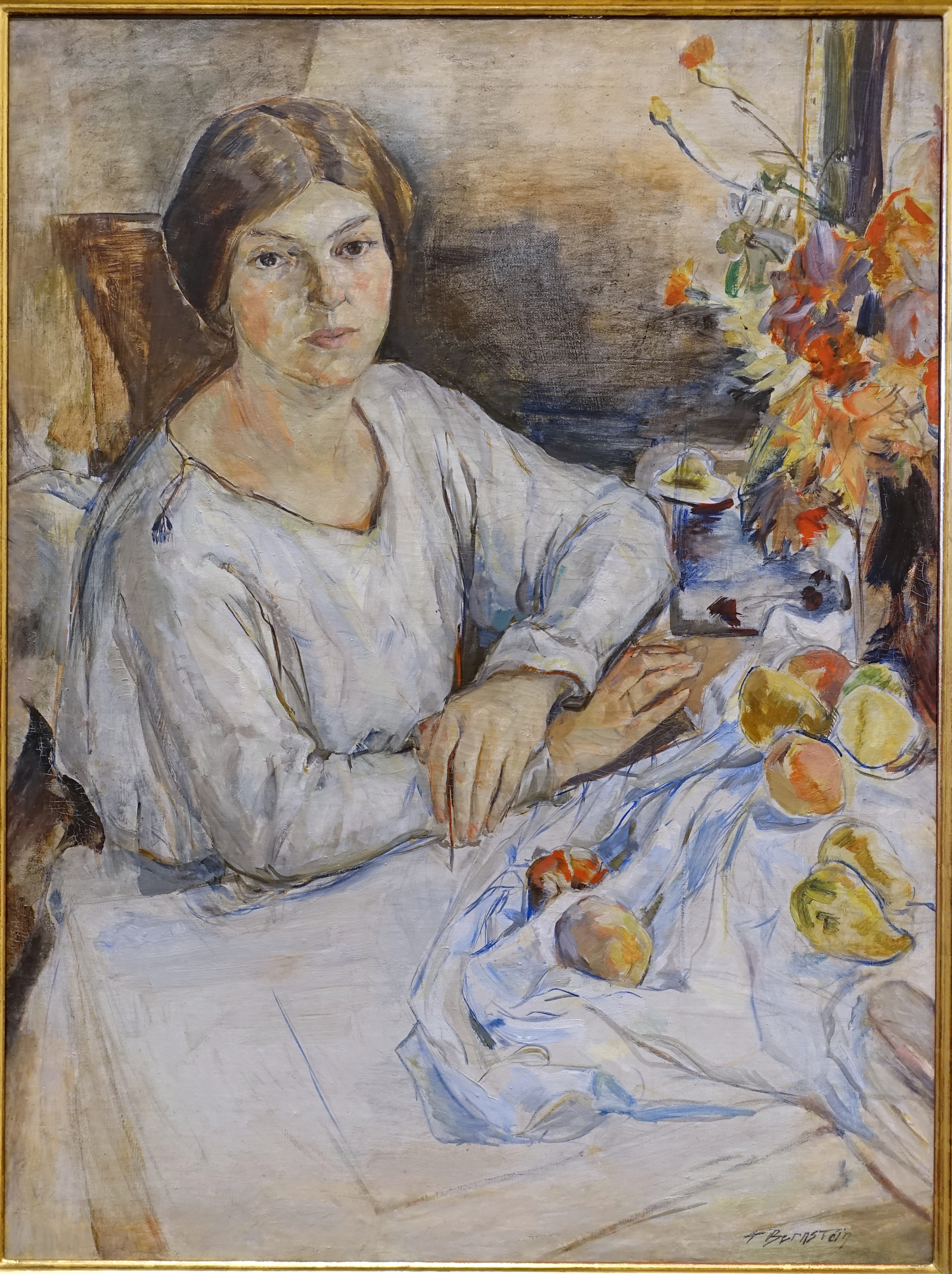
Self-portrait of the Artist, by Theresa Bernstein, c. 1920, oil on canvas - Cape Ann Museum - Gloucester, MA - DSC01453

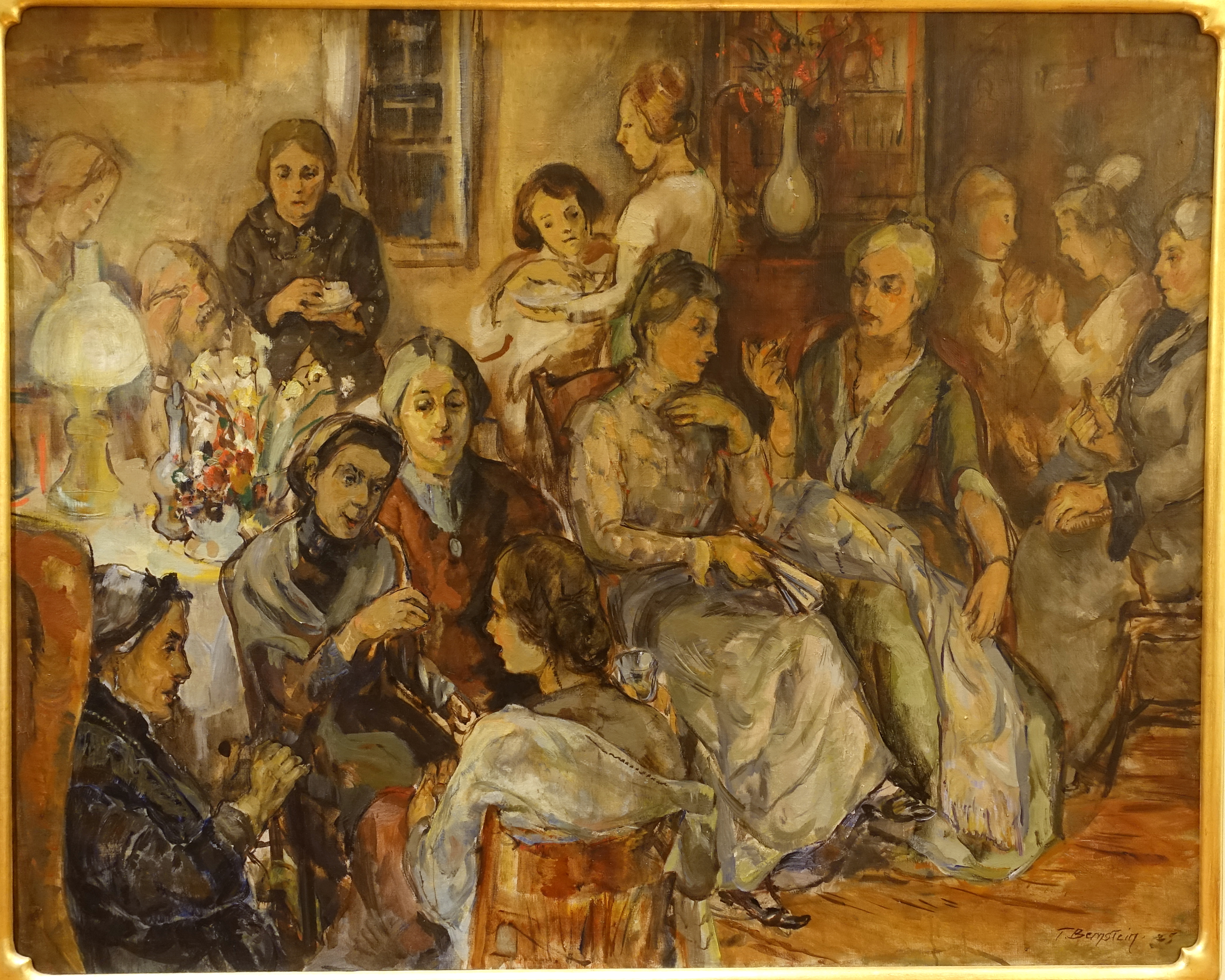
New England Ladies, by Theresa Bernstein, 1925, oil on canvas – Cape Ann Museum – Gloucester, MA – DSC01012

Among Bernstein's hundreds of works are the following of particular interest:

- Gypsy (1909), one of her earliest paintings, which was in the New York Realist style.
- The Readers (1914), based on her many hours spent at the New York Public Library, reading and sketching the people around her.
- Self-Portrait (1914), showing the influence of Fauvism yet still in the American realist tradition
- Girlhood (1921), a portrait typical of her 1920s work. The painting was purchased for the Phillips Collection, formerly called the Phillips Memorial Gallery, by Duncan Phillips, her first museum patron, in 1923.
- The First Orchestra in America, an oil mural on canvas in the Manheim, Pennsylvania post office, commissioned by the Treasury Section of Fine Arts, and completed in 1938.

An extensive gallery of Bernstein's paintings is available on the City University of New York website devoted to her life and work. See External links below.

=== Collections ===
Bernstein's artwork is held by a number of museums and other permanent collections, including:

- The Phillips Collection
- The Jewish Museum
- The National Gallery of Art.
- The Smithsonian American Art Museum
- The Harvard Art Museums
- The Metropolitan Museum of Art
- The New York Public Library
- The Boca Raton Museum of Art in Florida.

=== Books ===
- William Meyerowitz: The Artist Speaks, a biography of Bernstein's husband
- The Poetic Canvas
- The Journal
- Israeli Journal, covering her many trips to Israel and reflections on her Jewish heritage (originally published in 1994)

== Bibliography ==
- Levin, Gail (2013). Theresa Bernstein : a century in art. Lincoln: University of Nebraska Press. ISBN 978-0803248762.
