= Mon Tresor =

British-bred Thoroughbred racehorse

- Sire: Longleat
- Grandsire: The Minstrel
- Dam: La Lutine
- Damsire: My Swallow
- Sex: Stallion
- Foaled: 8 May 1986
- Country: United Kingdom
- Colour: Bay
- Breeder: A B Phipps
- Owner: Pam Fitsall
- Trainer: Ron Boss
- Record: 13: 4-2-1

Major wins
- Moët & Chandon Rennen (1988); Middle Park Stakes (1988)

Mon Tresor (8 May 1986 – after 2001) was a British Thoroughbred racehorse and sire. As a two-year-old in 1988, he showed his best form After winning two minor races in summer, where he reached his peak in autumn, winning the Moët & Chandon Rennen in Germany and then recording his biggest win in the Middle Park Stakes. In the following year he finished third in the European Free Handicap on his debut, but his form deteriorated thereafter. He was retired from racing at the end of the year and stood as a breeding stallion with limited success.

== Background ==
Mon Tresor was a bay horse bred in England by A B Phipps. He was from the third crop of foals sired by Longleat, an American-bred sprinter whose achievements included the Ballyogan Stakes in 1982. Mon Tresor's dam La Lutine won four races at distances from five to ten furlongs before being retired to become a broodmare. Her other foals included Mon Tresor's full-brother Montendre, a durable sprinter who won eleven races including the Cammidge Trophy. She was a descendant of the French broodmare La Futaie, the ancestor of many major winners including Sagamix, Nasram and Lope de Vega.

Mrs Pam Fitsall acquired Mon Tresor, and was sent into training with Ron Boss, who operated from the Phoenix Lodge stable in Newmarket, Suffolk. Boss had ridden for Noel Murless in the 1950s, and then worked as head lad for his fellow Welshman for Lewis before taking out a trainer's license in 1972.

== Racing career ==
=== 1988: two-year-old season ===
Mon Tresor began his racing career in a maiden race over six furlongs at Hamilton Park Racecourse on 16 June and finished second, beaten a head by Ipo. He recorded his first success in a similar event at Lingfield Park, three weeks later winning by two lengths from nineteen opponents at odds of 4/1. Eight days later, he returned to the same track for a graduation race (for horses with no more than one previous win) and started 5/2 favourite in an eleven-runner field. Ridden by Willie Carson he led from the start and won by two and a half lengths from Thornfield Boy. On July 30 in In the Glyfada Stakes at Newmarket Racecourse, he was beaten by the Henry Cecil, trained Citidancer. Mon Tresor was then sent to Germany to contest the Group Two Moët & Chandon Rennen over 1200 metres on heavy ground at Baden-Baden on 2 September. Richard Quinn rode him and scored his first important victory, defeating Money Matters by half a length.

On his return to England, Mon Tresor was stepped up in class for the Group One Middle Park Stakes over six furlongs at Newmarket on 28 September. The previously undefeated Pure Genius started favourite ahead of Northern Tryst and Sharp Justice (winner of the Sirenia Stakes) with Mon Tresor next in the betting on 8/1, whilst the two outsiders were Wonder Dancer and Terimon. Ridden by the South African jockey Michael Roberts he was sent into the lead from the start and stayed there, holding off the challenge of the favourite to win by three quarters of a length with the same distance back to Northern Tryst in third. On his final appearance of the season, Mon Tresor was stepped up in distance for the William Hill Futurity over one mile at Doncaster Racecourse on 22 October. He led until the last three furlongs but then faded badly and tailed-off last of the eight runners behind Al Hareb.

=== 1989: three-year-old season ===
Mon Tresor began his three-year-old season in the European Free Handicap over seven furlongs at Newmarket on 19 April. Carrying top weight of 133 pounds he led for most of the way but was overtaken inside the final furlong and finished third behind Danehill and Folly Foot. In the 2000 Guineas seventeen days later he started a 40/1 outsider and finished unplaced behind Nashwan. Mon Tresor never recovered his form and ran unplaced in his remaining four races: he finished fifth in the Diomed Stakes, eighth in the July Cup, eighth in the Prix Maurice de Gheest and seventh in the Flying Five.

== Stud record ==
At the end of his racing career Mon Tresor was retired to become a breeding stallion. He stood at the Fearnall Stud in Cheshire before being reportedly exported to Italy. The best of his offspring included Rushcutter Bay (Palace House Stakes) and Nigrasine (John of Gaunt Stakes).

== Pedigree ==
Pedigree of Mon Tresor (GB), bay stallion, 1986
Sire Longleat (USA) 1979	The Minstrel (CAN); 1974	Northern Dancer	Nearctic
Sire Longleat (USA) 1979	The Minstrel (CAN); 1974	Northern Dancer	Natalma
Sire Longleat (USA) 1979	The Minstrel (CAN); 1974	Fleur	Victoria Park
Sire Longleat (USA) 1979	The Minstrel (CAN); 1974	Fleur	Flaming Page
Sire Longleat (USA) 1979	Fair Arrow (USA); 1960	Turn-To	Royal Charger
Sire Longleat (USA) 1979	Fair Arrow (USA); 1960	Turn-To	Source Sucree
Sire Longleat (USA) 1979	Fair Arrow (USA); 1960	Omelia	Owen Tudor
Sire Longleat (USA) 1979	Fair Arrow (USA); 1960	Omelia	Dodoma
Dam La Lutine (GB) 1977	My Swallow (GB); 1968	Le Levanstell	Le Lavandou
Dam La Lutine (GB) 1977	My Swallow (GB); 1968	Le Levanstell	Stella's Sister
Dam La Lutine (GB) 1977	My Swallow (GB); 1968	Darrigle	Vilmoray
Dam La Lutine (GB) 1977	My Swallow (GB); 1968	Darrigle	Dollar Help
Dam La Lutine (GB) 1977	La Mome (GB); 1965	Princely Gift	Nasrullah
Dam La Lutine (GB) 1977	La Mome (GB); 1965	Princely Gift	Blue Gem
Dam La Lutine (GB) 1977	La Mome (GB); 1965	La Parisienne	Pardal
Dam La Lutine (GB) 1977	La Mome (GB); 1965	La Parisienne	La Baille (Family:11-d)
