= Zukunfts-Rennen =

Horse race in Germany

- Class: Group 3
- Location: Iffezheim Racecourse; Baden-Baden, Germany
- Inaugurated: 1859
- Race type: Flat / Thoroughbred
- Sponsor: Belmondo
- Website: Baden-Baden

Race information
- Distance: 1,400 metres (7f)
- Surface: Turf
- Track: Left-handed
- Qualification: Two-year-olds
- Weight: 57 kg Allowances; 1½ kg for fillies Penalties; 2 kg for Group winners 1 kg for Listed winners
- Purse: €55,000 (2012); 1st: €32,000

The Zukunfts-Rennen is a Group 3 flat horse race in Germany open to two-year-old thoroughbreds. It is run at Baden-Baden over a distance of 1,400 metres (about 7 furlongs), and it is scheduled to take place each year in late August or early September.

== History ==
The event was established in 1859, and it was initially contested over 1,000 metres. It was extended to 1,200 metres in 1883.

The Zukunfts-Rennen was given Group 3 status in the 1970s, and it was promoted to Group 2 level in 1982. It was sponsored by Moët & Chandon from 1982 to 1996, and by Raab Karcher from 1997 to 1999.

Maurice Lacroix took over the sponsorship in 2000, and for a period the event was known as the Maurice Lacroix-Trophy. Its distance was increased to 1,400 metres in 2006, and the race returned to Group 3 level in 2007. The association with Maurice Lacroix ended in 2008.

== Records ==
Leading jockey (5 wins):

- George Stern – Ob (1903), Champ d'Or (1904), Lord Burgoyne (1910), Quai des Fleurs (1911), Guerroyante (1913)
- Otto Schmidt – Augias (1922), Rosendame (1923), Faustina (1925), Adlerfee (1937), Schwarzgold (1939)

Leading trainer (7 wins):

- Mick Channon – Flying Squaw (1995), Muchea (1996), Golden Silca (1998), Checkit (2002), Mokabra (2003), Ajigolo (2005), Ayaar (2012)

(note: the trainers of some of the early winners are unknown)

== Winners since 1971 ==
Year	Winner	Jockey	Trainer	Time
1971	Tarim	Harro Remmert	Georg Zuber	1:12.10
1972	Uditore	Fritz Drechsler	Theo Grieper	1:12.50
1973	Lord Udo	Fritz Drechsler	Theo Grieper	1:11.70
1974	Kronenkranich	Harro Remmert	Sven von Mitzlaff	1:15.30
1975	Night Music	Peter Remmert	Hein Bollow	1:13.10
1976	Cagliostro	José Orihuel	Hein Bollow	1:12.50
1977	Limbo	Georg Bocskai	Oskar Langner	1:09.80
1978	Nebos	José Orihuel	Hein Bollow	1:15.20
1979	Imperator	Lutz Mäder	Arthur-Paul Schlaefke	1:11.60
1980	Un Sprinter	Lutz Mäder	Hein Bollow	1:13.50
1981	Landsgirl	Lutz Mäder	Hein Bollow	1:10.60
1982	Shicklah	Trevor Rogers	Harry Thomson Jones	1:10.80
1983	Water Moccasin	John Matthias	Ian Balding	1:12.80
1984	Sulaafah	Tony Murray	Harry Thomson Jones	1:13.10
1985	Alshinfarah	Tony Murray	Harry Thomson Jones	1:13.20
1986	Amigo Sucio	Simon Whitworth	Kim Brassey	1:10.00
1987	Antiqua	Guy Guignard	Jonathan Pease	1:12.20
1988	Mon Tresor	Richard Quinn	Ron Boss	1:16.10
1989	Somethingdifferent	Willie Carson	John Gosden	1:10.70
1990	Jimmy Barnie	Billy Newnes	John Dunlop	1:16.15
1991	Showbrook	Lester Piggott	Richard Hannon, Sr.	1:08.90
1992	Sharp Prod	Lester Piggott	Lord Huntingdon	1:17.14
1993	Owington	Michael Hills	Geoff Wragg	1:10.94
1994	Green Perfume ^{[a]}	Richard Quinn	Paul Cole	1:10.54
1995	Flying Squaw	Richard Hughes	Mick Channon	1:13.12
1996	Muchea	Richard Hughes	Mick Channon	1:10.58
1997	El Maimoun	Andreas Suborics	Mario Hofer	1:10.34
1998	Golden Silca	John Reid	Mick Channon	1:11.44
1999	Auenklang	Kevin Woodburn	Hans-Walter Hiller	1:08.33
2000	Tagshira	Torsten Mundry	Urs Suter	1:11.91
2001	Flying Dash	Andrasch Starke	Hans Blume	1:10.24
2002	Checkit ^{[b]}	Steve Drowne	Mick Channon	1:10.29
2003	Mokabra	Ted Durcan	Mick Channon	1:10.19
2004	Daring Love	Andreas Boschert	Uwe Ostmann	1:11.16
2005	Ajigolo	Ted Durcan	Mick Channon	1:10.31
2006	Global Dream	Andreas Boschert	Uwe Ostmann	1:27.20
2007	Pomellato	Andrasch Starke	Peter Schiergen	1:23.73
2008	Serienhoehe	Filip Minařík	Peter Schiergen	1:29.49
2009	Hearts of Fire	Olivier Peslier	Pat Eddery	1:29.33
2010	Salona ^{[c]}	Filip Minařík	Jean-Pierre Carvalho	1:26.90
2011	Amaron	Andreas Helfenbein	Andreas Löwe	1:25.97
2012	Ayaar	Martin Harley	Mick Channon	1:25.88
2013	Abendwind	Alexander Pietsch	Waldemar Hickst	1:27.02
2014	Citron Spirit	Antoine Hamelin	Mathire Palussiere	1:26.58
2015	Dessertoflife	Joe Fanning	Mark Johnston	1:25.34
2016	Navarra King	Andrasch Starke	Peter Schiergen	1:25.35
2017	Narella	Adrie de Vries	Markus Klug	1:25.57
2018	Quest The Moon	Oisin Murphy	Sarah Steinberg	1:25.99
2019	Alson	Filip Minařík	Jean-Pierre Carvalho	1:25.07
2020	Reine D'Amour	Andreas Helfenbein	Marcel Weiss	1:26.90
2021	Rocchigiani	Bauyrzhan Murzabayev	Peter Schiergen	1:26.33
2022	Habana	Eduardo Pedroza	Andreas Wohler	1:27.92
2023	Carolina Reaper	Jack Mitchell	Charlie Johnston	1:27.14
2024	Santagada	Sibylle Vogt	Peter Schiergen	1:24.67
2025	Gostam	Eduardo Pedroza	A Wohler	1:24.80
2026	Gymbaazy	Daniel Muscutt	Owen Burrows	1:26.80

^{a} Desidera finished first in 1994, but she was relegated to second place following a stewards' inquiry.
^{b} Easy Way was first in 2002, but he was placed second after a stewards' inquiry.
^{c} Nice Danon was the original winner in 2010, but he was demoted to second after an appeal.

== Earlier winners ==
- 1859: Atalanta
- 1860: Meleager
- 1861: Partisan
- 1862: Le Marechal
- 1863: Soumise
- 1864: Clermont
- 1865: Czar
- 1866: Montgoubert
- 1867: Le Sarrazin
- 1868: Mademoiselle de Fligny
- 1869: Florian
- 1870: no race
- 1871: Cigarette
- 1872: Espagniola
- 1873: Dorothee
- 1874: Constanz
- 1875: Vordermann
- 1876: Kincsem
- 1877: Sabinus
- 1878: Picklock
- 1879: Waidmannsheil
- 1880: Balvany
- 1881: Gyöngyvirag
- 1882: Maria
- 1883: Gabernie
- 1884: Italy
- 1885: Fenek
- 1886: Bulgar
- 1887: Kiralyne
- 1888: Sappho
- 1889: Yellow
- 1890: Nordstern
- 1891: Fra Angelico
- 1892: Romito
- 1893: Melchior
- 1894: Gloire de Dijon
- 1895: Trivial
- 1896: Wolkenschieber
- 1897: Habenichts
- 1898: Gastfreund
- 1899: Don Jose
- 1900: Zuleika
- 1901: Alençon
- 1902: Mireille
- 1903: Ob
- 1904: Champ d'Or
- 1905: Fels
- 1906: Fabula
- 1907: Sauge Pourpree
- 1908: Roquelaure
- 1909: Antwort
- 1910: Lord Burgoyne
- 1911: Quai des Fleurs
- 1912: Laudon
- 1913: Guerroyante
- 1914–20: no race
- 1921: Alpenrose
- 1922: Augias
- 1923: Rosendame
- 1924: Marcellus
- 1925: Faustina
- 1926: Oberwinter
- 1927: Contessa Maddalena
- 1928: Walzertraum
- 1929: Ladro
- 1930: Tourbillon
- 1931: Pancho
- 1932: Alchimist
- 1933: Pelopidas
- 1934: Contessina
- 1935: Nereide
- 1936: Trollius
- 1937: Adlerfee
- 1938: Canzoni
- 1939: Schwarzgold
- 1940: no race
- 1941: Blaue Adria
- 1942: Contessa Pilade *
- 1943: Träumerei *
- 1944–47: no race
- 1948: Donar
- 1949–50: no race
- 1951: Faubourg
- 1952: Maruschka
- 1953: Usurpator
- 1954: Tactic
- 1955: Liebeslied
- 1956: Orsini
- 1957: Andrea
- 1958: Bennigsen
- 1959: Angelica
- 1960: Oceana
- 1961: Amboss
- 1962: Anatol
- 1963: Skat
- 1964: Radames
- 1965: Doupaulette
- 1966: Priamos
- 1967: Gluck
- 1968: Lemon Hart
- 1969: Paroli
- 1970: Isztopirin

* The 1942 and 1943 races were held at Hoppegarten.

== See also ==
- List of German flat horse races
