= Mattaboy =

British-bred Thoroughbred racehorse

- Sire: Music Boy
- Grandsire: Jukebox
- Dam: Green Chartreuse
- Damsire: French Beige
- Sex: Stallion
- Foaled: 3 March 1978
- Country: United Kingdom
- Colour: Chestnut
- Breeder: Cheveley Park Stud
- Owner: Ravi Tikkoo
- Trainer: Robert Armstrong; Peter Howe; Robert Armstrong
- Record: 13: 2-3-1

Major wins
- Star Stakes (1980); Middle Park Stakes (1980)

Awards
- Timeform rating 121 (1980), 124 (1981), 115 (1982)

Mattaboy (3 March 1978 – ca. 1999) was a British Thoroughbred racehorse and sire. As a two-year-old in 1980 he won on his debut and went on to finish second in the Mill Reef Stakes before recording his most important victory in the Middle Park Stakes. He failed to win in 1981 but produced a career-best performance when narrowly beaten by To-Agori-Mou in the 2000 Guineas. A brief sojourn in the United States was unsuccessful and he was well beaten in two starts as a four-year-old. After his retirement from racing Mattaboy stood as a breeding stallion in Japan, where he had limited success as a sire of winners.

== Background ==
Mattaboy was a chestnut horse with a narrow white blaze bred in England by the Cheveley Park Stud. He was from the first crop of foals sired by Music Boy, a high-class sprinter whose wins included the Gimcrack Stakes in 1975 and the King George Stakes in the following year. He began his stud career at the "bargain basement" fee of £500 but was the leading first-season sire in Britain in 1980. Mattaboy's dam Green Chartreuse won two minor races as a two-year-old in 1972 and was a half-sister to the Gran Premio del Jockey Club winner Stateff. She was a great-granddaughter of the broodmare Greenbridge, whose other descendants have included Minster Son.

As a yearling, Mattaboy was offered for sale at auction and was bought for 10,500 guineas by the bloodstock agent Tote Cherry-Downes on behalf of the Indian shipping magnate Ravi Tikkoo. The colt was sent into training with Robert Armstrong at Newmarket, Suffolk.

== Racing career ==
=== 1980: two-year-old season ===
Mattaboy never contested a maiden race, instead making his racecourse debut in the five furlong Star Stakes at Sandown Park Racecourse in July and winning easily from two opponents. In August he started odds-on favourite for the Rous Memorial Stakes at Goodwood Racecourse but was beaten one and a half lengths by the filly Integrity, to whom he was conceding six pounds in weight. Later in the month he contested the Prince of Wales's Stakes at York Racecourse and finished third behind the fillies Marwell and Welshwyn. In the Mill Reef Stakes at Newbury Racecourse in September he led for most of the way before being overtaken a furlong out and was beaten one and a half lengths by Sweet Monday.

In October, Mattaboy was moved up to Group One class for the first time in the Middle Park Stakes over six furlongs at Newmarket Racecourse. Ridden by Robert Armstrong's brother-in-law Lester Piggott he started the 7/1 fifth choice in the betting behind Bel Bolide (winner of the Gimcrack Stakes), Cooliney Prince (Windsor Castle Stakes), Goodbye Starter and Band Practice (runner-up in the Phoenix Stakes). The other four runners were Parkdale and Poldhu who had finished second and third in the Gimcrack, and the outsiders New Year's Day and Von Erlach. He raced towards the rear of the field as Bel Bolide set the pace before moving up rapidly on the rail to challenge the leader a quarter of a mile from the finish. After a sustained struggle in the closing stages, Mattaboy drew ahead in the final strides and won by half a length from Bel Bolide, with Poldhu two lengths back in third.

=== 1981: three-year-old season ===
Mattaboy finished unplaced on his three-year-old debut and was then sent to France for the Poule d'Essai des Poulains over 1600 metres at Longchamp Racecourse on 26 April. Ridden by Pat Eddery, he started a 17/1 outsider and finished eighth of the ten runners behind Recitation. Following two poor performances, the colt started a 50/1 outsider for the 173rd running of the 2000 Guineas over the Rowley Mile course at Newmarket on 2 May. He was hampered at the start and then fought against John Reid's attempts to restrain him at the rear of the field. In the second half of the race he made rapid progress to dispute the lead and got the better of a struggle with Bel Bolide but was caught in the final strides and beaten a neck by the favourite To-Agori-Mou. Two weeks after his run at Newmarket, Mattaboy was sent to the Curragh and started third favourite for the Irish 2,000 Guineas. Ridden by Tony Murray he finished fourth of the thirteen runners in a controversial race won by Kings Lake.

Mattaboy was scheduled to face To-Agori-Mou and Kings Lake in the St James's Palace Stakes at Royal Ascot but was withdrawn after being found to be running an abnormally high temperature on the morning of the race. He reappeared in the Sussex Stakes at Goodwood on 29 July but ran poorly and finished seventh, thirteen lengths behind the winner Kings Lake. He was then sent to race in the United States where he was trained by Peter Howe. On his only North American start he finished fifth in an allowance race at Saratoga Race Course on 19 August and was subsequently returned to England to rejoin Armstrong's stable.

=== 1982: four-year-old season ===
Mattaboy was campaigned as a sprinter in 1982, but failed to win in his two races. He showed some promise on his debut when finishing seventh behind Lightning Label in the Palace House Stakes over five furlongs at Newmarket May. He started favourite for the Duke of York Stakes later that month but ran disappointingly and finished unplaced behind Jester. He was later found to have sustained a serious injury to the ligaments in his right foreleg and did not race again.

== Assessment ==
In the official International Classification of European two-year-olds for 1980, Mattaboy was given a rating of 76, making him 12 pounds inferior to the top-rated Storm Bird. The independent Timeform organisation rated him on 121, thirteen pounds behind Storm Bird, who was their best two-year-old of the year. In their annual Racehorses of 1980 Timeform described Mattaboy as "the best of mediocre bunch of two-year-old colt sprinters". In the following year Timeform gave him a rating of 124, sixteen pounds behind their Horse of the Year Shergar. He received a Timeform rating of 115 in 1982.

== Stud record ==
At the end of his racing career Mattaboy was exported to become a breeding stallion in Japan. He stood in Japan from 1983 until 1999 but covered very few mares after 1989. He sired 86 winners from 200 registered foals, with the best of his offspring being the Niigata Daishoten winner Make A Smart.

== Pedigree ==
Pedigree of Mattaboy (GB), chestnut stallion, 1978
Sire Music Boy (GB) 1973	Jukebox (GB); 1966	Sing Sing	Tudor Minstrel
Sire Music Boy (GB) 1973	Jukebox (GB); 1966	Sing Sing	Agin the Law
Sire Music Boy (GB) 1973	Jukebox (GB); 1966	Bibi Mah	Tehran
Sire Music Boy (GB) 1973	Jukebox (GB); 1966	Bibi Mah	Mulier Magnifica
Sire Music Boy (GB) 1973	Veronique (GB); 1961	Matador	Golden Cloud
Sire Music Boy (GB) 1973	Veronique (GB); 1961	Matador	Spanish Galantry
Sire Music Boy (GB) 1973	Veronique (GB); 1961	Narcisse	Niccolo dell'Arca
Sire Music Boy (GB) 1973	Veronique (GB); 1961	Narcisse	Asphodele
Dam Green Chartreuse (GB) 1970	French Beige (GB); 1953	Bois Roussel	Vatout
Dam Green Chartreuse (GB) 1970	French Beige (GB); 1953	Bois Roussel	Plucky Liege
Dam Green Chartreuse (GB) 1970	French Beige (GB); 1953	Nivea	Nearco
Dam Green Chartreuse (GB) 1970	French Beige (GB); 1953	Nivea	Deva
Dam Green Chartreuse (GB) 1970	Green Velvet (GB); 1965	Epaulette	Court Martial
Dam Green Chartreuse (GB) 1970	Green Velvet (GB); 1965	Epaulette	Golden Sari
Dam Green Chartreuse (GB) 1970	Green Velvet (GB); 1965	Greenheart	Borealis
Dam Green Chartreuse (GB) 1970	Green Velvet (GB); 1965	Greenheart	Greenbridge (Family:14-a)
