= George Valentine Cox =

English author

George Valentine Cox (1786–1875), was an English writer.

Cox was born at Oxford in 1786, was educated at Magdalen College School and New College, Oxford graduated B. A., and was elected esquire bedel in law in 1806. He took the degree of M.A. in 1808, and was elected esquire bedel in medicine and arts in 1815. He held this office until 1866, when he retired on a pension. He was also coroner to the university. He died in March 1875.

He published 'Jeannette Isabelle.' a novel in three volumes, London, 1837, 12mo, three translations from the German, viz. F. C. Dahlmann's 'Life of Herodotus,' London, 1845, 8vo; J. A. W. Neander's ' Emperor Julian and his Generation,' London, 1850, 8vo; and C. Ullmann's 'Gregory of Nazianzum,' London, 1851, 8vo; also 'Prayer-Book Epistles,' &c., London, 1846, 8vo; and 'Recollections of Oxford,' London, 1868, 8vo.
