= William Meyerowitz =

American artist

William Meyerowtiz (15 July 1887 – 29 May 1981) was an American artist known for his paintings and etchings. William Meyerowitz was born in Ekaterinoslav on July 15, 1887. He and his father immigrated to New York City in 1908, and they settled on the Lower East Side of Manhattan. William studied etching at the National Academy of Design. While he was a student he sang in the chorus of the Metropolitan Opera. He was involved with the People's Art Guild, an organization led by Professor John Weischel, Robert Henri and George Bellows that brought art directly to poor people. It was through his work with the People's Art Guild that he met his wife, artist Theresa Bernstein. The couple would spend their summers in the Gloucester, Massachusetts art colony and the rest of the year in New York. Both artists were charter members of the Society of Independent Artists.

Supreme Court Justice Oliver Wendell Holmes gave him his first portrait commission, and he completed portraits of several Justices of the Supreme Court. He completed a mural for a post office in Clinton, Connecticut. He died in New York on 29 May 1981, at the age of 93.

His art is in the permanent collections of the Metropolitan Museum of Art, the Museum of Modern Art, Whitney Museum, Peabody Essex Museum, the Brooklyn Museum of Art, and the Smithsonian American Art Museum.
