= Alexander Robb Cox =

English cricketer

Alexander Cox
Personal information
- Full name: Alexander Robb Cox
- Born: 6 August 1865; West Derby, Liverpool, Lancashire
- Died: 21 November 1950 (aged 85); Newmarket, Suffolk
- Role: Wicket-keeper
- Relatives: Alfred Cox (brother); George Cox (brother)

Domestic team information
- Years: Team
- 1887: Cambridge University
- Source: Cricinfo, 28 April 2017

Alexander Robb Cox (6 August 1865 – 21 November 1950) was an English racehorse owner who also played first-class cricket whilst at university.

Cox was born at West Derby in Liverpool in 1865, the son of Alexander Robb Cox and Margaret Lockhart Greenshields. His father was a wealthy textiles merchant from a family which was originally based in Dundee. The family purchased the Hafod Elwy Estate in North Wales in 1864, initially as a base for hunting, and Cox later lived at Tan Llan near Dolgellau.

Educated at Harrow School where he played in the cricket and association football teams, Cox went up to Trinity College, Cambridge after leaving school in 1884. He played two first-class cricket matches for Cambridge University Cricket Club, although he did not win a Blue. A wicket-keeper, he scored a total of six runs in the three innings in which he batted, with a highest score of four. He graduated in 1887 and went in to business in London.

In 1919 Cox's brother, the racehorse owner Alfred W. Cox died, leaving his racing business and financial fortune to Cox. He won the Trial Stakes at Ascot with Ciceronnetta and the Goodwood Cup with Queen's Square in 1919, and became "well-known" as a racehorse owner, with his horses including Picaroon, one of the leading colts of the mid-1920s.

Cox died at Newmarket in 1950. he was aged 85.
