= George R. Cox =

American politician

47th Mayor of Cheyenne, Wyoming
- In office January 2, 1968 – August 11, 1969
- Preceded by: Bill Herbert Kingham
- Succeeded by: Floyd Holland

Member of the Wyoming House of Representatives from the Laramie County district
- In office 1963 – August 11, 1969
- Succeeded by: Peter Mulvaney

Personal details
- Born: January 7, 1932 Cheyenne, Wyoming, U.S.
- Died: August 11, 1969 (aged 37) Arlington County, Virginia, U.S.
- Party: Democratic
- Spouse: Pat
- Children: 2

George R. Cox (January 7, 1932 – August 11, 1969) was an American politician who served as the 47th Mayor of Cheyenne, Wyoming, and in the Wyoming House of Representatives as a member of the Democratic Party.

== Early life ==
George R. Cox was born in Cheyenne, Wyoming, on January 7, 1932, and graduated from Cheyenne High School. He attended both the University of Michigan and the University of Wyoming. He married Pat, with whom he had two children.

== Career ==
=== Wyoming House of Representatives ===
Cox was elected to the Wyoming House of Representatives from one of Laramie County's six seats with the Democratic nomination in the 1962 election. He won reelection in the 1964 election and served four terms in the state house. During his tenure in the state house he served as the chair of the Ways and Means committee.

=== Local politics ===
Cox served as a member of the zoning board in Cheyenne in the 1960s. Cox announced his mayoral campaign on October 2, 1967, and defeated R. E. Cheever, after placing behind him in the primary, before a recount verified his victory. He was Cheyenne's second-youngest mayor at the time. He died from heart stoppage due to a blocked artery at Arlington Memorial Hospital in Arlington County, Virginia, on August 11, 1969. Floyd Holland was selected to serve as acting mayor to fill the vacancy created by Cox's death while Peter Mulvaney was selected to replace Cox in the state house.

== Electoral history ==
1967 Cheyenne, Wyoming mayoral primary
Party	Candidate	Votes	%	±%
Nonpartisan	R. E. Cheever	2,996	31.69%	
Nonpartisan	George R. Cox	2,341	24.76%	
Nonpartisan	Bill Nation	2,089	22.10%	
Nonpartisan	Jim Van Velzor	1,264	13.37%	
Nonpartisan	Henry Jensen	676	7.15%	
Nonpartisan	Ray Gawryluk	88	0.93%	
Total votes		9,454	100.00%	
