= Alfred W. Cox =

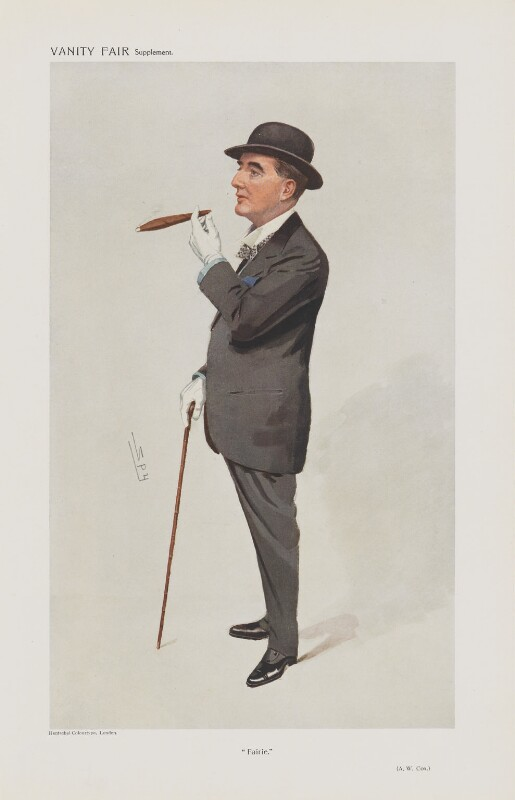
"Fairie", caricature by Spy in Vanity Fair, 1910.

Alfred William Cox (born Liverpool, England, 1857, died London, England 4 May 1919) was a racehorse owner and breeder.

He was the son of a wealthy Scottish cotton broker, Alexander Robb Cox, and Margaret Lockhart Greenshields. His father Alexander was a director and partner in the firm of Cox, McEuon which dealt in jute, flax and hemp. The family bought the Hafod Elwy Estate in North Wales in 1864 for a holiday home and the estate remained in the possession of the family until 1987.

About 1877 when Alfie failed to pass into The Royal Military Academy, Woolwich he was sent off to Australia where he tried his hand at farming. In 1881 he visited his uncle Henry Cox in Birkenhead. He was considered to be quite a determined person.

In 1884, Alfie obtained a share in a mine at Broken Hill playing cards with George McCulloch. Following the discovery of silver he became a wealthy man and returned to London, where he indulged his love of horse racing as an owner and breeder, running his horses under the pseudonym of Mr Fairie.

His horses, including Bramble, Peterhof, Lemberg, Bayardo and Gay Crusader, were listed as starters in many races between 1887 and his death in 1919.

Alfie did not marry and upon his death his fortune, consisting of money and his stables of racehorses, passed to his younger brother Alexander Robb Cox.

Alfie's youngest brother Lieutenant Ernest Cox entered the army at the age of 23 in 1891 and joined the 72nd Seaforth Highlanders. He died on 11 December 1899 at the Battle of Magersfontein during the Second Boer War. In 1898 Ernest had served in the Khartum expedition of the Sudan Campaign as extra Aide-de-Camp to General William Forbes Gatacre commanding the British Division.
