= Sussex Stakes =

British Thoroughbred horse race

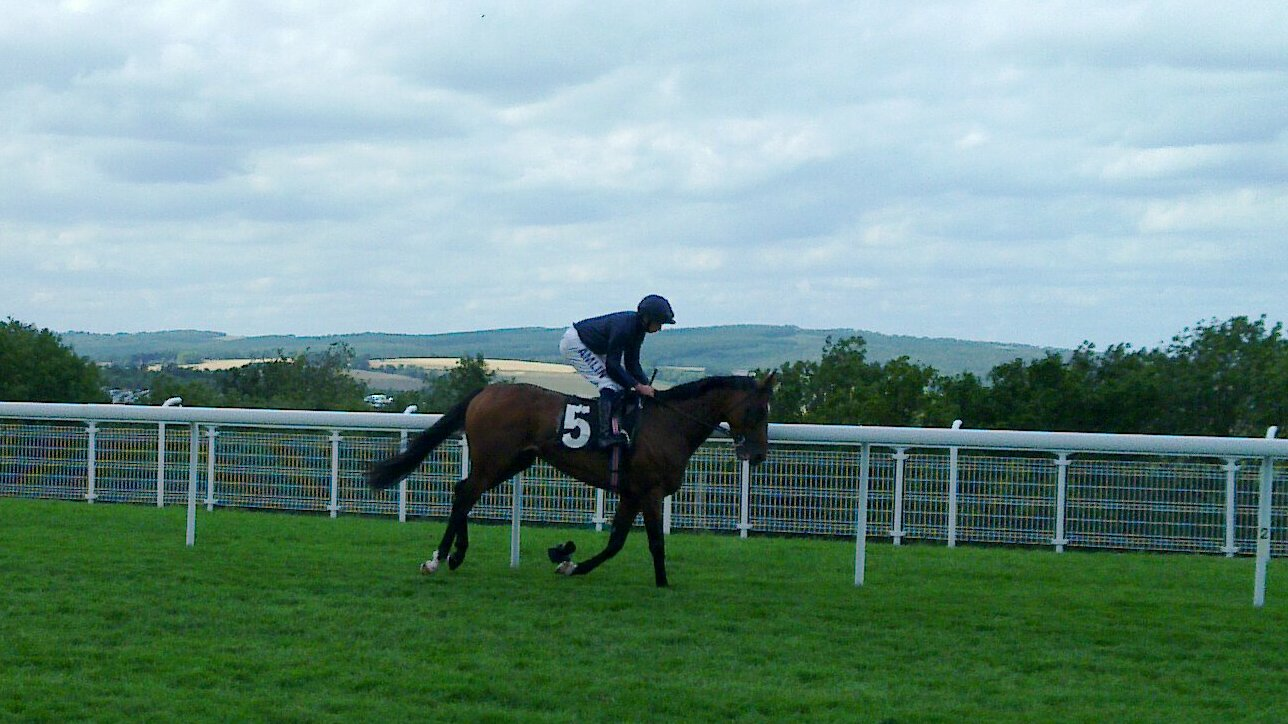
- Rip Van Winkle heading to post for the 2010 running of the Sussex Stakes
- Class: Group 1
- Location: Goodwood Racecourse; W. Sussex, England
- Inaugurated: 1841
- Race type: Flat / Thoroughbred
- Sponsor: Visit Qatar
- Website: Goodwood

Race information
- Distance: 1 mile (1,609 metres)
- Surface: Turf
- Track: Right-handed
- Qualification: Three-years-old and up
- Weight: 9 st 2 lb (3yo); 9 st 10 lb (4yo+); Allowances; 3 lb for fillies and mares
- Purse: £1,057,500 (2025); 1st: £599,708

Sussex Stakes
2026
Bow Echo	Gstaad	Opera Ballo

Previous years
2025
Qirat	Rosallion	Henri Matisse
2024
Notable Speech	Maljoom	Facteur Cheval
2023
Paddington	Facteur Cheval	Charyn
2022
Baaeed	Modern Games	Alcohol Free
2021
Alcohol Free	Poetic Flare	Snow Lantern

2020-2011
2020
Mohaather	Circus Maximus	Siskin
2019
Too Darn Hot	Circus Maximus	I Can Fly
2018
Lightning Spear	Expert Eye	Lord Glitters
2017
Here Comes When	Ribchester	Lightning Spear
2016
The Gurkha	Galileo Gold	Ribchester
2015
Solow	Arod	Gabrial
2014
Kingman	Toronado	Darwin
2013
Toronado	Dawn Approach	Declaration Of War
2012
Frankel	Farhh	Gabrial
2011
Frankel	Canford Cliffs	Rio De La Plata

2010–2001
2010
Canford Cliffs	Rip Van Winkle	Premio Loco
2009
Rip Van Winkle	Paco Boy	Ghanaati
2008
Henrythenavigator	Raven's Pass	Major Cadeaux
2007
Ramonti	Excellent Art	Jeremy
2006
Court Masterpiece	Soviet Song	Rob Roy
2005
Proclamation	Soviet Song	Ad Valorem
2004
Soviet Song	Nayyir	Le Vie Dei Colori
2003
Reel Buddy	Statue Of Liberty	Norse Dancer
2002
Rock Of Gibraltar	Noverre	Reel Buddy
2001
Noverre	No Excuse Needed	Black Minnaloushe

2000–1991
2000
Giant's Causeway	Dansili	Medicean
1999
Aljabr	Docksider	Almushtarak
1998
Among Men	Almushtarak	Lend A Hand
1997
Ali-Royal	Starborough	Allied Forces
1996
First Island	Charnwood Forest	Alhaarth
1995
Sayyedati	Bahri	Darnay
1994
Distant View	Barathea	Grand Lodge
1993
Bigstone	Sayyedati	Inchinor
1992
Marling	Selkirk	Second Set
1991
Second Set	Shadayid	Priolo

1990–1981
1990
Distant Relative	Green Line Express	Shavian
1989
Zilzal	Green Line Express	Markofdistinction
1988
Warning	Then Again	Most Welcome
1987
Efisio	Hadeer	Star Cutter
1986
Sonic Lady	Scottish Reel	Pennine Walk
1985
Rousillon	Bairn	King of Clubs
1984
Chief Singer	Creag-an-Sgor	Wassl
1983
Noalcoholic	Tolomeo	Wassl
1982
On The House	Sandhurst Prince	Achieved
1981
King's Lake	To-Agori-Mou	Noalto

1980–1971
1980
Posse	Final Straw	Star Way
1979
Kris	Swiss Maid	Alert
1978
Jaazeiro	Radetzky	Formidable
1977
Artaius	Free State	Relkino
1976
Wollow	Free State	Poacher's Moon
1975
Bolkonski	Rose Bowl	Lianga
1974
Ace of Aces	Habat	Mount Hagen
1973
Thatch	Jacinth	Sun Prince
1972
Sallust	High Top	Sparkler
1971
Brigadier Gerard	Faraway Son	Joshua

1970–1968
1970
Humble Duty	Gold Rod	Joshua
1969
Jimmy Reppin	Dutch Delight	Murrayfield
1968
Petingo	World Cup	Frankincense

The Sussex Stakes is a Group 1 flat horse race in Great Britain open to horses aged three years or older. It is run at Goodwood over a distance of 1 mile (1,609 metres), and it is scheduled to take place each year in late July or early August.

== History ==
The first version of the event, a 6-furlong race for two-year-olds, was established in 1841. It continued intermittently for thirty-seven years, but it was uncontested on twenty-five occasions including fourteen walkovers.

The Sussex Stakes became a 1-mile race for three-year-olds in 1878. The previous version had been overshadowed by both the Goodwood Cup and the Stewards' Cup, but in its modified form it became the most prestigious race at Goodwood.

The event was opened to four-year-olds in 1960, and to horses aged five or older in 1975.

The race is currently held on the second day of the five-day Glorious Goodwood meeting.

== Records ==
Most successful horse (2 wins):

- Frankel – 2011, 2012

Leading jockey (8 wins):

- Sir Gordon Richards – Marconigram (1928), Corpach (1936), Pascal (1937), Radiotherapy (1946), Combat (1947), Krakatao (1949), Le Sage (1951), Agitator (1952)

Leading trainer (7 wins):

- Sir Henry Cecil – Bolkonski (1975), Wollow (1976), Kris (1979), Distant View (1994), Ali-Royal (1997), Frankel (2011, 2012)

Leading owner (7 wins):

- Sue Magnier – Among Men (1998), Giant's Causeway (2000), Rock of Gibraltar (2002), Henrythenavigator (2008), Rip Van Winkle (2009), The Gurkha (2016),Paddington (2023)

== Winners ==
Year	Winner	Age	Jockey	Trainer	Owner	Time
1878	Clocher	3	John Osborne Jr		L Delatre
1879	Rayon d'Or	3	James Goater	Tom Jennings	Frederic de Lagrange
1880	Mask	3	Tom Cannon	C Blanton	Prince Soltykoff
1881	Limestone	3	Fred Archer	T Wadlow	3rd Earl of Bradford
1882	Comte Alfred	3	George Fordham	Tom Jennings	C J Lefevre
1883	Ossian	3	Charles Wood	R Sherrard	Sir G Chetwynd
1884	Hermitage	3	Fred Webb	Tom Jennings	C J Lefevre
1885	Paradox	3	Fred Archer	John Porter	William Broderick Cloete
1886	Chelsea	3	James Goater	William Goater	G Lambert
1887	Reve d'Or	3	Charles Wood	Alec Taylor Sr.	8th Duke of Beaufort
1888	Zanzibar	3	George Barrett	C W Golding	Duchess of Montose
1889	Enthusiast	3	Billy Warne	James Ryan	Douglas Baird
1890	St Serf	3	John Watts	George Dawson	6th Duke of Portland
1891	Orvieto	3	Tom Cannon	James Ryan	J H Houldsworth
1892	Orme	3	George Barrett	John Porter	1st Duke of Westminster
1893	Harbinger	3	Mornington Cannon	James Ryan	Douglas Baird
1894	Matchbox	3	John Watts	Richard Marsh	Maurice de Hirsch
1895	Troon	3	John Watts	George Dawson	6th Duke of Portland
1896	Regret	3	Mornington Cannon	John Porter	1st Duke of Westminster
1897	Ardeshir	3	Charles Wood	James Waugh	Mr Theobalds
1898	Dieudonne	3	John Watts	Richard Marsh	8th Duke of Devonshire	1:44.20
1899	Caiman	3	Mornington Cannon	John Huggins	Lord W Beresford	1:50.00
1900	The Raft	3	Lester Reiff	Fred Day	Abe Bailey
1901	Energetic	3	Otto Madden	James Ryan	J H Houldsworth
1902	Royal Lancer	3	Willie Lane	William Waugh	J Blundell Maple	1:44.40
1903	Stephanas	3	Herbert Jones	Richard Marsh	Arthur James
1904	Mousqueton	3	Harry Aylin	Harry Enoch	Douglas Baird
1905	Thrush	3	Herbert Randall	Edward Robson	J Orr-Ewing
1906	Troutbeck	3	Herbert Jones	William Waugh	2nd Duke of Westminster
1907	Wool Winder	3	William Halsey	Harry Enoch	Edward Baird
1908	White Eagle	3	William Higgs	Atty Persse	William Hall-Walker	1:44.80
1909	Minoru	3	Herbert Jones	Richard Marsh	Edward VII
1910	Winkipop	3	Herbert Jones	William Waugh	Waldorf Astor
1911	Stedfast	3	Frank Wootton	George Lambton	17th Earl of Derby
1912	Tracery	3	Danny Maher	John Watson	August Belmont Jr.
1913	Sun Yat	3	Frank Wootton	Charles Morton	Jack Barnato Joel
1914	Black Jester	3	Steve Donoghue	Charles Morton	Jack Barnato Joel
1915-18	No race
1919	Glanmerin	3	Steve Donoghue	Samuel Pickering	Lord H Vane-Tempest
1920	Braishfield	3	Frank Bullock	Alec Taylor Jr.	G H Deane
1921	Sunblaze	3	Brownie Carslake	Atty Persse	L Robinson	1:43.00
1922	Diligence	3	Fred Lane	Alfred Sadler Jr.	5th Earl of Lonsdale	1:50.00
1923	Hurry Off	3	Brownie Carslake	Atty Persse	2nd Duke of Westminster	1:46.20
1924	Burslem	3	Michael Beary	Atty Persse	Abe Bailey	1:45.00
1925	The Monk	3	Harry Wragg	Walter Earl	Solomon Joel
1926	Plimsol	3	Bobby Jones	Alec Taylor Jr.	2nd Viscount Astor	1:42.60
1927	Rosalia	3	Harry Wragg	J H Crawford	Victor Sassoon	1:44.80
1928	Marconigram	3	Gordon Richards	Fred Darling	1st Baron Dewar	1:45.40
1929	Le Phare	3	Michael Beary	Dick Dawson	Aga Khan III	1:40.40
1930	Paradine	3	Bobby Jones	Joseph Lawson	W Cazalet	1:43.80
1931	Inglesant	3	Bobby Jones	Joseph Lawson	S Tattersall	1:48.80
1932	Dastur	3	Michael Beary	Frank Butters	Aga Khan III	1:51.60
1933	The Abbot	3	Joe Childs	Willie Jarvis	George VI	1:43.60
1934	Badruddin	3	Freddie Fox	Frank Butters	Aga Khan III	1:43.20
1935	Hairan	3	Richard Perryman	Frank Butters	Aga Khan III	1:40.40
1936	Corpach	3	Gordon Richards	Joseph Lawson	2nd Viscount Astor	1:45.40
1937	Pascal	3	Gordon Richards	Fred Darling	Henry Morriss	1:40.20
1938	Faroe	3	Richard Perryman	Colledge Leader	17th Earl of Derby	1:41.60
1939	Olein	3	Tommy Lowrey	Basil Jarvis	Lord Glanely	1:42.60
1940	No race
1941 (Note: The 1941 race was run at Newmarket.)	Eastern Echo	3	Michael Beary	Joseph Lawson	Lord Glanely	1:39.60
1942-45	No race
1946	Radiotherapy	3	Gordon Richards	Fred Templeman	Vera Lilley	1:43.00
1947	Combat	3	Gordon Richards	Fred Darling	John Arthur Dewar	1:45.20
1948	My Babu	3	Charlie Smirke	Sam Armstrong	Maharaja of Baroda	1:42.80
1949	Krakatao	3	Gordon Richards	Noel Murless	3rd Earl of Feversham	1:42.60
1950	Palestine	3	Charlie Smirke	Marcus Marsh	Aga Khan III	1:43.60
1951	Le Sage	3	Gordon Richards	T Carey	S Sangar	1:43.80
1952	Agitator	3	Gordon Richards	Noel Murless	John Arthur Dewar	1:41.00
1953	King of the Tudors	3	Charlie Spares	William Stephenson	Frank Dennis	1:43.40
1954	Landau	3	William Snaith	Noel Murless	Queen Elizabeth II	1:48.20
1955	My Kingdom	3	Doug Smith	Harry Wragg	Walter Nightingall	1:41.00
1956	Lucero	3	Manny Mercer	Harry Wragg	Gerry Oldham	1:45.20
1957	Quorum	3	Alexander Russell	Wilfred Lyde	T Farr	1:42.20
1958	Major Portion	3	Eph Smith	Ted Leader	Jim Joel	1:48.40
1959	Petite Etoile	3	Lester Piggott	Noel Murless	Prince Aly Khan	1:44.60
1960	Venture	3	George Moore	Alec Head	Aga Khan IV	1:44.80
1961	Le Levanstell	4	Bill Williamson	Seamus McGrath	Joseph McGrath	1:43.80
1962	Romulus	3	Wally Swinburn	F Johnson Houghton	Charles Engelhard	1:39.00
1963	Queen's Hussar	3	Ron Hutchinson	Thomas Corbett	6th Earl of Carnarvon	1:40.20
1964	Roan Rocket	3	Lester Piggott	George Todd	T Frost	1:39.60
1965	Carlemont	3	Ron Hutchinson	Paddy Prendergast	L Gelb	1:45.00
1966	Paveh	3	Ron Hutchinson	T Ainsworth	Peter A. B. Widener III	1:42.80
1967	Reform	3	Scobie Breasley	Gordon Richards	Michael Sobell	1:42.40
1968	Petingo	3	Lester Piggott	Sam Armstrong	Marcos Lemos	1:39.00
1969	Jimmy Reppin	4	Geoff Lewis	John Sutcliffe	Mrs Sidney Bates	1:39.40
1970	Humble Duty	3	Duncan Keith	Peter Walwyn	Jean, Lady Ashcombe	1:40.60
1971	Brigadier Gerard	3	Joe Mercer	Dick Hern	Jean Hislop	1:41.11
1972	Sallust	3	Joe Mercer	Dick Hern	Sir Michael Sobell	1:37.59
1973	Thatch	3	Lester Piggott	Vincent O'Brien	Jack Mulcahy	1:39.19
1974	Ace of Aces	4	Jimmy Lindley	Maurice Zilber	Nelson Bunker Hunt	1:41.82
1975	Bolkonski	3	Gianfranco Dettori	Henry Cecil	Carlo d'Alessio	1:39.56
1976	Wollow	3	Gianfranco Dettori	Henry Cecil	Carlo d'Alessio	1:39.74
1977	Artaius	3	Lester Piggott	Vincent O'Brien	Mrs George Getty II	1:39.51
1978	Jaazeiro	3	Lester Piggott	Vincent O'Brien	Robert Sangster	1:40.30
1979	Kris	3	Joe Mercer	Henry Cecil	Lord Howard de Walden	1:41.75
1980	Posse	3	Pat Eddery	John Dunlop	Ogden Mills Phipps	1:41.63
1981	Kings Lake	3	Pat Eddery	Vincent O'Brien	Mrs Jean-Pierre Binet	1:39.38
1982	On The House	3	John Reid	Harry Wragg	Sir Philip Oppenheimer	1:37.65
1983	Noalcoholic	6	George Duffield	Gavin Pritchard-Gordon	William du Pont III	1:37.51
1984	Chief Singer	3	Ray Cochrane	Ron Sheather	Jeff Smith	1:38.21
1985	Rousillon	4	Greville Starkey	Guy Harwood	Khalid Abdullah	1:41.07
1986	Sonic Lady	3	Walter Swinburn	Michael Stoute	Sheikh Mohammed	1:39.65
1987	Soviet Star	3	Greville Starkey	André Fabre	Sheikh Mohammed	1:38.83
1988	Warning	3	Pat Eddery	Guy Harwood	Khalid Abdullah	1:39.83
1989	Zilzal	3	Walter Swinburn	Michael Stoute	Mana Al Maktoum	1:36.77
1990	Distant Relative	4	Willie Carson	Barry Hills	Wafic Saïd	1:36.06
1991	Second Set	3	Frankie Dettori	Luca Cumani	Richard L. Duchossois	1:40.53
1992	Marling	3	Pat Eddery	Geoff Wragg	Sir Edmund Loder	1:36.68
1993	Bigstone	3	Dominique Boeuf	Élie Lellouche	Daniel Wildenstein	1:40.19
1994	Distant View	3	Pat Eddery	Henry Cecil	Khalid Abdullah	1:35.71
1995	Sayyedati	5	Brett Doyle	Clive Brittain	Mohamed Obaida	1:36.17
1996	First Island	4	Michael Hills	Geoff Wragg	Mollers Racing	1:37.75
1997	Ali-Royal	4	Kieren Fallon	Henry Cecil	Greenbay Stables Ltd	1:37.98
1998	Among Men	4	Michael Kinane	Sir Michael Stoute	Tabor / Magnier	1:40.23
1999	Aljabr	3	Frankie Dettori	Saeed bin Suroor	Godolphin	1:35.66
2000	Giant's Causeway	3	Michael Kinane	Aidan O'Brien	Magnier / Tabor	1:38.65
2001	Noverre	3	Frankie Dettori	Saeed bin Suroor	Godolphin	1:37.12
2002	Rock of Gibraltar	3	Michael Kinane	Aidan O'Brien	Ferguson / Magnier	1:38.29
2003	Reel Buddy	5	Pat Eddery	Richard Hannon Sr.	Speedlith Group	1:40.00
2004	Soviet Song	4	Johnny Murtagh	James Fanshawe	Elite Racing Club	1:36.98
2005	Proclamation	3	Michael Kinane	Jeremy Noseda	Princess Haya of Jordan	1:40.16
2006	Court Masterpiece	6	Jimmy Fortune	Ed Dunlop	Gainsborough Stud	1:36.10
2007	Ramonti	5	Frankie Dettori	Saeed bin Suroor	Godolphin	1:37.62
2008	Henrythenavigator	3	Johnny Murtagh	Aidan O'Brien	Sue Magnier	1:38.46
2009	Rip Van Winkle	3	Johnny Murtagh	Aidan O'Brien	Magnier / Tabor / Smith	1:37.16
2010	Canford Cliffs	3	Richard Hughes	Richard Hannon Sr.	Heffer / Roy / Instance	1:37.44
2011	Frankel	3	Tom Queally	Sir Henry Cecil	Khalid Abdullah	1:37.47
2012	Frankel	4	Tom Queally	Sir Henry Cecil	Khalid Abdullah	1:37.56
2013	Toronado	3	Richard Hughes	Richard Hannon Sr.	Joaan Al Thani	1:36.29
2014	Kingman	3	James Doyle	John Gosden	Khalid Abdullah	1:41.75
2015	Solow	5	Maxime Guyon	Freddy Head	Wertheimer et Frère	1:39.18
2016	The Gurkha	3	Ryan Moore	Aidan O'Brien	Magnier / Tabor / Smith	1:37.35
2017	Here Comes When	7	Jim Crowley	Andrew Balding	Fitri Hay	1:46.11
2018	Lightning Spear	7	Oisin Murphy	David Simcock	Qatar Racing	1:39.89
2019	Too Darn Hot	3	Frankie Dettori	John Gosden	Lord Lloyd-Webber	1:38.57
2020	Mohaather	4	Jim Crowley	Marcus Tregoning	Hamdan Al Maktoum	1:38.75
2021	Alcohol Free	3	Oisin Murphy	Andrew Balding	Jeff Smith	1:42.83
2022	Baaeed	4	Jim Crowley	William Haggas	Shadwell Estate	1:37.74
2023	Paddington	3	Ryan Moore	Aidan O'Brien	Tabor / Smith / Magnier et al.	1:47.16
2024	Notable Speech	3	William Buick	Charlie Appleby	Godolphin	1:35.97
2025	Qirat	4	Richard Kingscote	Ralph Beckett	Juddmonte	1:37.92
2026	Bow Echo	3	Billy Loughnane	George Boughey	Exors Of The Late Sheikh Mohammed Obaid	1:36.03

* There was no race in 1915, 1916, 1917, 1918, 1940, 1942, 1943, 1944 and 1945 due to World Wars I & II.

== See also ==
- Horse racing in Great Britain
- List of British flat horse races
