= Ossian (horse) =

British-bred Thoroughbred racehorse

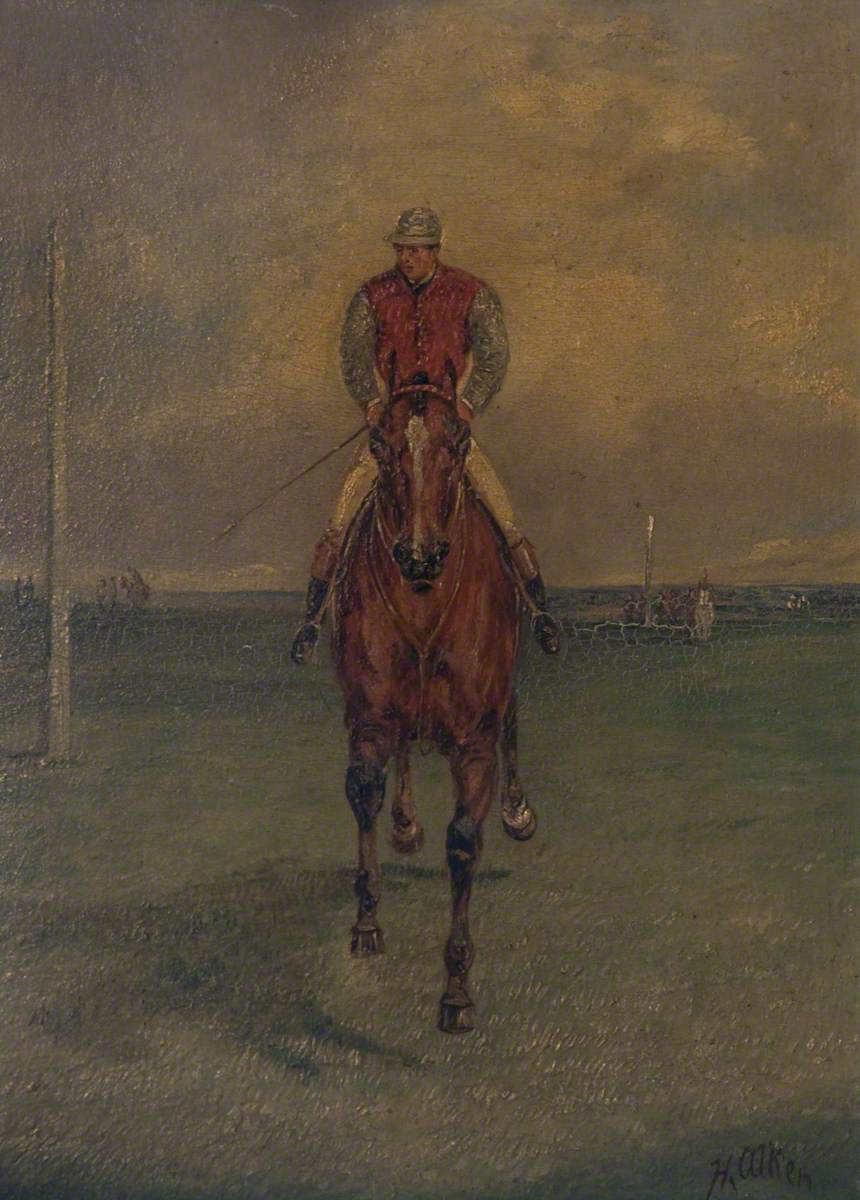
- 'Ossian', Winner of the Doncaster St Leger, by Samuel Henry Alken (1883)
- Sire: Salvator
- Grandsire: Dollar
- Dam: Music
- Damsire: Stockwell
- Sex: Stallion
- Foaled: 1880
- Country: United Kingdom
- Colour: Bay
- Breeder: William Douglas-Hamilton, 12th Duke of Hamilton
- Owner: 12th Duke of Hamilton
- Trainer: Richard Marsh
- Record: 18: 6-6-3
- Earnings: £9,311

Major wins
- Sussex Stakes (1883); Drawing Room Stakes (1883); Great Yorkshire Handicap (1883); St Leger (1883); Great Foal Stakes (1883); Claret Stakes (1883)

Awards
- Biggest money-winner in Britain (1883)

Ossian (1880 – 1891) was a British Thoroughbred racehorse and sire. After finishing unplaced on his only start as a juvenile and running fifth on his three-year-old debut, he made very good progress and ended the year as the biggest money-winner in Britain. He demonstrated consistent top-class form to win the Sussex Stakes, Drawing Room Stakes, Great Yorkshire Handicap, St Leger Stakes and Great Foal Stakes a well as being placed in the Craven Stakes, Prince of Wales's Stakes, Ascot Derby and Champion Stakes. As four-year-old he developed respiratory problems but walked over for the Claret Stakes and was placed in both the Goodwood Cup and the Doncaster Cup. He made little impact in his short career as a breeding stallion before dying at age 11 while being exported to the United States.

== Background ==
Ossian was a bay or brown horse bred and owned by William Douglas-Hamilton, 12th Duke of Hamilton. The colt was sent into training with Richard Marsh at Newmarket, Suffolk.

He was sired by Salvator, the best horse of his generation in France, who was unbeaten in seven races including the Prix du Jockey Club and the Grand Prix de Paris. He was a representative of the Byerley Turk sire line, unlike more than 95% of modern thoroughbreds, who descend directly from the Darley Arabian. Ossian's dam Music also produced Poetry, the dam of Thais.

== Racing career ==
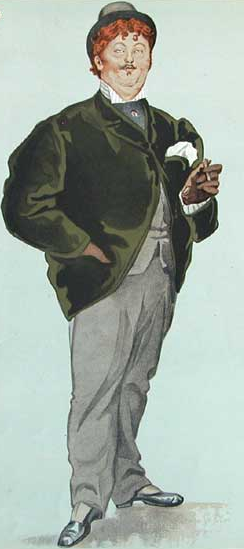
12th Duke of Hamilton, Ossian's breeder and owner

=== 1882: two-year-old season ===
On his only start as a two-year-old Ossian finished unplaced in the Molecomb Stakes at Goodwood Racecourse, a race which resulted in a dead-heat between Elzevir and St. Blaise.

=== 1883: three-year-old season ===
==== Spring ====
Ossian began his second campaign in the Biennial Stakes over the Rowley Mile at Newmarket Racecourse in April. He looked well short of full fitness and ran accordingly, finishing fifth in a six-runner race won by Grandmaster. Two days later, over the Ancaster Mile at the same track, the colt produced a much better effort in the Craven Stakes when he ran second to Grandmaster, beaten three quarters of a length by the winner. At Newmarket on 10 May he was stepped up in distance for the Payne Stakes over ten furlongs in which he finished a close third behind Splendor and Ladislas, with Grandmaster unplaced.

At the Derby meeting at Epsom Racecourse Ossian contested the Epsom Grand Prize over ten furlongs in which he started at 7/1 and came home third behind Padlock and Goldfield.

==== Summer ====
At Royal Ascot in June Ossian ran twice over still longer distances. He started at odds of 9/1 for the Prince of Wales Stakes (then restricted to three-year-olds and run over thirteen furlongs) and after taking the lead on the final turn he finished second, a length behind the 2000 Guineas winner Galliard. In the Ascot Derby two days later, ridden by Charles Wood, he was beaten a head by Ladislas after a "desperate race" over the final furlong, with the Epsom Derby winner St Blaise in third.

Later that summer at Goodwood Racecourse Ossian was dropped back to one mile for the £1,337 Sussex Stakes for which he was made the 6/4 favourite. With Wood in the saddle he dominated the race in the closing stages and "romped" to victory by four lengths from Stonecrop. On the following afternoon John Watts took the ride when the colt started favourite for the ten-furlong Drawing Room Stakes and won "in a canter" by four length from Henley. Later in the meeting, however, he was beaten a head by Blue Grass in the Racing Stakes, after which bookmakers offered him at odds of 40/1 for the St Leger whilst Bell's Life described him as one of the "ragged rank and file". At York in August he carried a weight of 126 pounds fourteen furlong Great Yorkshire Stakes in which he was ridden by Watts and started at odds of 9/2. He took the lead on the final turn and held off the challenge of Chislehurst to win by a neck in a "splendid finish" with Ladislas two lengths back in third place. His performance re-established him as one of the leading contenders for the St Leger.

==== Autumn ====
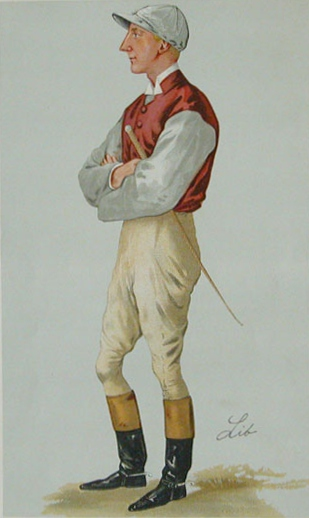
John Watts, who rode Ossian to victory in the St Leger

On 12 September Ossian, ridden by Watts, was one of nine three-year-olds to contest the 108th running of the £4,725 St Leger over 14 1/2 furlongs at Doncaster Racecourse and started at odds of 9/1. Lord Ellesmere's Highland Chief (second in the Derby) started 5/2 favourite ahead of Royal Angus, with the other fancied runners included Elzevir (Royal Hunt Cup), Ladislas and The Prince. Ossian started well and then settled in second place behind his stablemate Cecil Craven who was acting as a pacemaker. Cecil Craven dropped back with five furlongs left to run and Ossian entered the straight with a clear advantage over Chislehurst and Highland Chief with the rest of the runners struggling to stay in contention. Chislehurst briefly looked likely to mount a serious challenge, but Ossian drew away inside the final furlong to win by three lengths. Highland Chief came home lame in third with long gaps back to the other finishers.

Less than two weeks after his Leger win, Ossian started at 7/1 for the Great Foal Stakes over ten furlongs "across the flat" at Newmarket, carrying a seven-pound penalty which took his weight up to 131 pounds. The nine-runner field included Goldfield, The Prince and the Epsom Oaks winner Bonny Jean. Ridden by Watts, Ossian was always among the leaders, established a clear lead entering the last two furlongs and won by a length from Goldfield. At Newmarket on 11 October Ossian was matched against older horses in the Champion Stakes and started the 9/4 second favourite behind the five-year-old Tristan. He took the lead a quarter of a mile from the finish but lost ground when swerving entering the final furlong and finished second, beaten a length by Tristan with Dutch Oven taking third.

Ossian ended the year with earning of £9,111, making him the most financially successful horse of the year in England.

=== 1884: four-year-old season ===
On his first start of 1884 Ossian walked over for the Claret Stakes at Newmarket in April. On 31 July Ossian was matched against the outstanding three-year-old stayer St Simon in the Goodwood Cup over 2 1/2 miles. He proved no match for his younger rival being "galloped into a standstill" and beaten 20 lengths into second place. By this point in his career Ossian reported developed breathing problems and was described as a roarer.

At Doncaster in September Ossian came home third behind Louis d'Or and The Lambkin in the Doncaster Cup. On 9 October he ran for the second time in the Champion Stakes and finished fourth behind Tristan, who dead-heated for first place with Lucerne. Ossian was retired from racing at the end of the year.

== Stud record ==
Ossian was retired from racing to become a breeding stallion but had little success as a sire of winners. The most successful of his offspring was probably Zenobia, who won the Preis der Diana. Another of his daughters was Lady Cecil, the grand-dam of Challacombe. Ossian was sold for $10,000 in December 1890 to American turfman J. B. Ferguson, but died of exhaustion in early 1891 when the steamship he was traveling on was caught in a storm while en route to New York City.

== Pedigree ==
Pedigree of Ossian (GB), bay or brown stallion, 1880
Sire Salvator (FR) 1872	Dollar; 1860	The Flying Dutchman (GB)	Bay Middleton
Sire Salvator (FR) 1872	Dollar; 1860	The Flying Dutchman (GB)	Barbelle
Sire Salvator (FR) 1872	Dollar; 1860	Payment (GB)	Slane
Sire Salvator (FR) 1872	Dollar; 1860	Payment (GB)	Receipt
Sire Salvator (FR) 1872	Sauvagine; 1857	Ion (GB)	Cain
Sire Salvator (FR) 1872	Sauvagine; 1857	Ion (GB)	Margaret
Sire Salvator (FR) 1872	Sauvagine; 1857	Cuckoo (GB)	Elis
Sire Salvator (FR) 1872	Sauvagine; 1857	Cuckoo (GB)	Reel
Dam Music (GB) 1866	Stockwell; 1849	The Baron (IRE)	Birdcatcher
Dam Music (GB) 1866	Stockwell; 1849	The Baron (IRE)	Echidna
Dam Music (GB) 1866	Stockwell; 1849	Pocahontas	Glencoe
Dam Music (GB) 1866	Stockwell; 1849	Pocahontas	Marpessa
Dam Music (GB) 1866	One Act; 1853	Annandale	Touchstone
Dam Music (GB) 1866	One Act; 1853	Annandale	Rebecca
Dam Music (GB) 1866	One Act; 1853	Extravaganza	Voltaire
Dam Music (GB) 1866	One Act; 1853	Extravaganza	Burletta (Family 23-a)
