= The Lambkin =

British-bred Thoroughbred racehorse

- Sire: Camballo
- Grandsire: Cambuscan
- Dam: Mint Sauce
- Damsire: Young Melbourne
- Sex: Stallion
- Foaled: 1881
- Country: United Kingdom
- Colour: Bay
- Breeder: Clare Vyner
- Owner: Robert Vyner
- Trainer: Mathew Dawson
- Record: 8: 3-2-0
- Earnings: £5,713

Major wins
- Esher Stakes (1884); St Leger (1884)

The Lambkin (1881 – May 1900) was a British Thoroughbred racehorse and sire. He showed moderate ability as a two-year-old in 1883 when he won one minor race from two starts. In the following year he was well beaten on his debut but then won the Esher Stakes before finishing second when matched against top-class French opposition in the Grand Prix de Paris. At Doncaster Racecourse in September he was able to exploit his superior fitness to record his biggest success in the St Leger, beating the winner of that year's 2000 Guineas and Epsom Derby. In two subsequent races he finished second in the Doncaster Cup and came home unplaced in the Cesarewitch. As a breeding stallion he had no success as a sire of winners but did exert an enduring influence on the breed though his daughter Standon Girl.

== Background ==
The Lambkin was a "great, leathering" bay horse bred in England by Mr Clare Vyner. He was owned during his racing career by Vyner's brother Robert, who inherited him on Clare's death. The colt was sent into training with Mathew Dawson at the Heath House stable in Newmarket, Suffolk.

He was one of the best horses sired by Camballo, who was trained by Dawson to win the 2000 Guineas in 1875. The Lambkin's dam Mint Sauce went on to produce the 1000 Guineas winner Minthe (also by Camballo) and Minting.

== Racing career ==
=== 1883: two-year-old season ===
The Lambkin made a successful racecourse debut when he won a Rous Plate worth £397 at Doncaster Racecourse. On his only other start of the year he ran unplaced in the Chesterfield Nursery Handicap.

=== 1884: three-year-old season ===
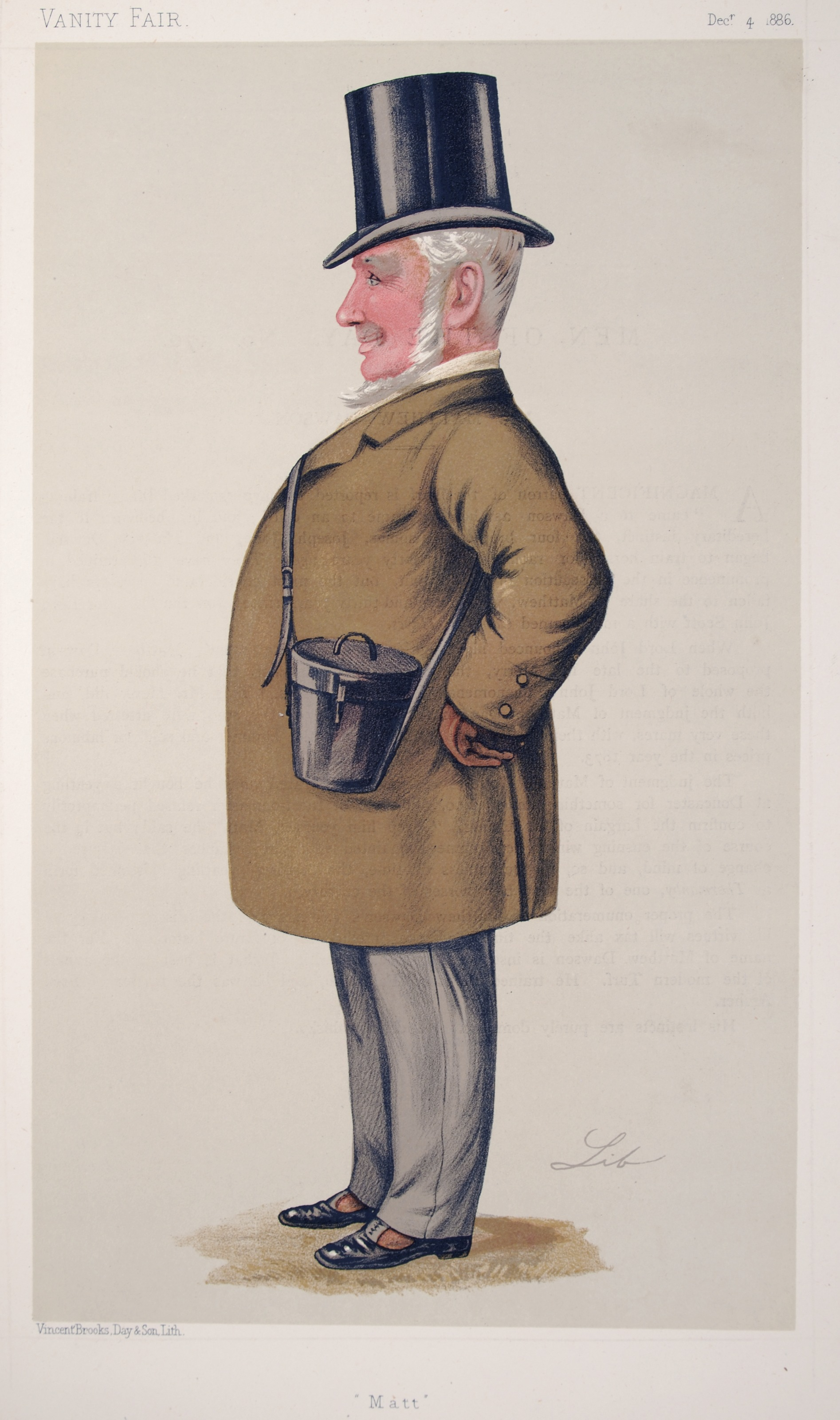
Mathew Dawson, The Lambkin's trainer

The Lambkin's first appearance of 1884 came on April when he started a 25/1 outsider for the City and Suburban Handicap over ten furlongs at Epsom Racecourse carrying 84 pounds and finished ninth behind the five-year-old Quicklime. Fred Archer took the ride at Sandown Park Racecourse in May when the colt started at odds of 4/1 in an eight-runner field and showed much improved form to win from the favourite Acrostic.

On 8 June The Lambkin contested the £4,000 Grand Prix de Paris over 3100 metres at Longchamp Racecourse. With Archer again in the saddle he finished second to the Prix du Jockey Club winner Little Duck with the Grand Critérium winner Fra Diavolo in third place. The Lambkin was then trained for the St Leger. The hot, dry weather led to the turf at Newmarket becoming exceptionally hard and while many of the leading horses of the year were either injured or prevented from training, The Lambkin appeared to thrive and had no difficulty maintaining his fitness by galloping on the "adamant" ground.

At Doncaster on 10 September The Lambkin was one of thirteen three-year-olds to contest the 109th running of the St Leger over fourteen and half furlongs. Absent from the race were the season's two best colts St. Gatien (who had never been entered for the race) and St Simon (whose entry had been invalidated by the death of his owner). The race took place in fine, sunny weather and attracted a large crowd. Before the race Captain Machell attempted to have the horse disqualified from starting on the grounds that he had been entered for the race by Robert Vyner when he was still in the ownership of the terminally ill Clare Vyner, but the objection was not sustained by the stewards. An open betting heat saw Scot Free start the 4/1 favourite ahead of Superba (second in the Oaks Stakes), Harvester and Sir Reuben (Prince of Wales's Stakes), with The Lambkin, ridden by John Watts being made the 9/1 fifth choice. After several false starts the race began with The Lambkin at the rear of the field, but Watts moved him forward to settle behind the leaders before taking second place behind Hermitage with half a mile left to run. The Lambkin took the lead soon afterwards and entered the straight with a clear advantage from Sir Reuben, Superba and the 40/1 outsider Sandiway. He was briefly headed by Superba but rallied to regain the advantage as the filly faltered and in a "stoutly-contested" race he prevailed by a length from Sandiway with Superba three quarters of a length back in third. As the Vyner family originated in Yorkshire the victory was met with "noisy revelry" by the crowd who regarded the winner a "one of their own". Another individual with cause to celebrate was the Prince of Wales who had reportedly wagered heavily on The Lambkin.

Two days later at the same track, The Lambkin was stepped up in distance and matched against older horses in the two mile, five furlong Doncaster Cup. He finished second to the French six-year-old Louis d'Or with third place going to the 1883 St Leger winner Ossian. At Newmarket on 7 October The Lambkin carried a weight of 116 pounds and started at odds of 100/6 for the Cesarewitch over two and a quarter miles. He began to struggle six furlongs from the finish and was unplaced in a race won by St Gatien.

The Lambkin ended the year with winnings of £5,316.

== Stud record ==
The Lambkin was retired from racing to become a breeding stallion but made no impact a sire of winners. He did, however sire Standon Girl, a broodmare whose female-line descendants have included Peleid, Treasure Beach, Hethersett, Neasham Belle, Doyoun, Alexandrova and Humble Duty. The Lambkin died in May 1900.

== Pedigree ==
Pedigree of The Lambkin (GB), bay stallion, 1881
Sire Camballo (GB) 1872	Cambuscan; 1861	Newminster	Touchstone*
Sire Camballo (GB) 1872	Cambuscan; 1861	Newminster	Beeswing
Sire Camballo (GB) 1872	Cambuscan; 1861	The Arrow	Slane
Sire Camballo (GB) 1872	Cambuscan; 1861	The Arrow	Southdown
Sire Camballo (GB) 1872	Little Lady; 1858	Orlando*	Touchstone*
Sire Camballo (GB) 1872	Little Lady; 1858	Orlando*	Vulture*
Sire Camballo (GB) 1872	Little Lady; 1858	Volley	Voltaire
Sire Camballo (GB) 1872	Little Lady; 1858	Volley	Martha Lynn
Dam Mint Sauce (GB) 1875	Young Melbourne; 1855	Melbourne	Humphrey Clinker
Dam Mint Sauce (GB) 1875	Young Melbourne; 1855	Melbourne	Cervantes mare
Dam Mint Sauce (GB) 1875	Young Melbourne; 1855	Clarissa	Pantaloon
Dam Mint Sauce (GB) 1875	Young Melbourne; 1855	Clarissa	Glencoe mare
Dam Mint Sauce (GB) 1875	Sycee; 1864	Marsyas	Orlando*
Dam Mint Sauce (GB) 1875	Sycee; 1864	Marsyas	Malibran
Dam Mint Sauce (GB) 1875	Sycee; 1864	Rose of Kent	Kingston
Dam Mint Sauce (GB) 1875	Sycee; 1864	Rose of Kent	Englands Beauty (Family 1-r)

* The Lambkin is inbred 3S x 4D to the stallion Orlando, meaning that he appears third generation on the sire side of his pedigree, and fourth generation on the dam side of his pedigree.

* The Lambkin is inbred 4S x 4S x 5D to the stallion Touchstone, meaning that he appears fourth generation twice on the sire side of his pedigree, and fifth generation once (via Orlando) on the dam side of his pedigree.
