= Thais (horse) =

British-bred Thoroughbred racehorse

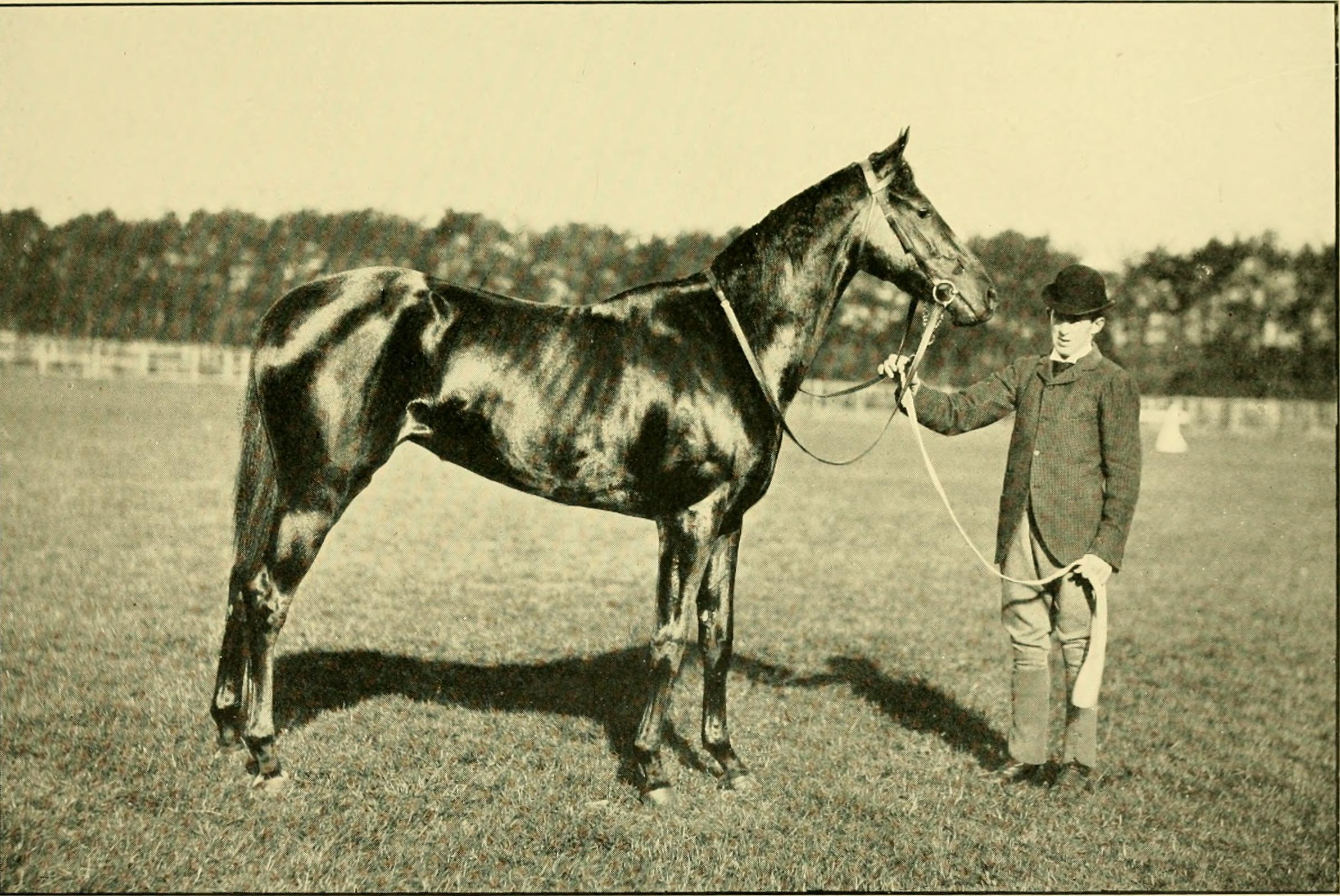
- From King Edward VII as a sportsman (Alfred Edward Thomas Watson, 1911)
- Sire: St Serf
- Grandsire: St Simon
- Dam: Poetry
- Damsire: Petrarch
- Sex: Mare
- Foaled: 1893
- Country: United Kingdom
- Colour: Brown
- Breeder: Prince of Wales
- Owner: Prince of Wales
- Trainer: Richard Marsh
- Record: 7: 2-2-2

Major wins
- 1000 Guineas (1896)

Thais (1893–1898) was a British Thoroughbred racehorse and broodmare. She showed very promising form as a juvenile in 1895 when she was placed in the New Stakes and the July Stakes before winning the Crabbet Plate at Gatwick. In the following year she won the 1000 Guineas and finished second in both the Epsom Oaks and the Coronation Stakes before being retired at the end of the season. She had no chance to prove her worth as a broodmare, dying at the age of five without producing a foal.

== Background ==
Thais was a bay mare bred by her owner the Prince of Wales. She was sent into training with Richard Marsh at Egerton House in Newmarket, Suffolk. She was described as a "delicate and highly-strung" filly.

She was sired by St Serf who won the Rous Memorial Stakes and went on to sire several other good horses included the St Leger winner Challacombe. Her dam Poetry, a half-sister to the St Leger winner Ossian, was bred by the Duke of Devonshire and bought by the Prince of Wales for 430 guineas.

== Racing career ==
=== 1895: two-year-old season ===
At Royal Ascot on 20 June Thais started at odds of 11/4 for the New Stakes over 5 1/2 furlongs. Ridden by T J Calder she finished third, beaten a head and two lengths by Roquebrune and Shaddock. In the July Stakes at Newmarket Racecourse she was made 2/1 favourite but finished a close third to the colts Galeazzo and Labrador. On 24 July, with Calder in the saddle, the filly recorded her first success when she won the £1000 Crabbet Plate over five furlongs at Gatwick Racecourse.

=== 1896: three-year-old season ===
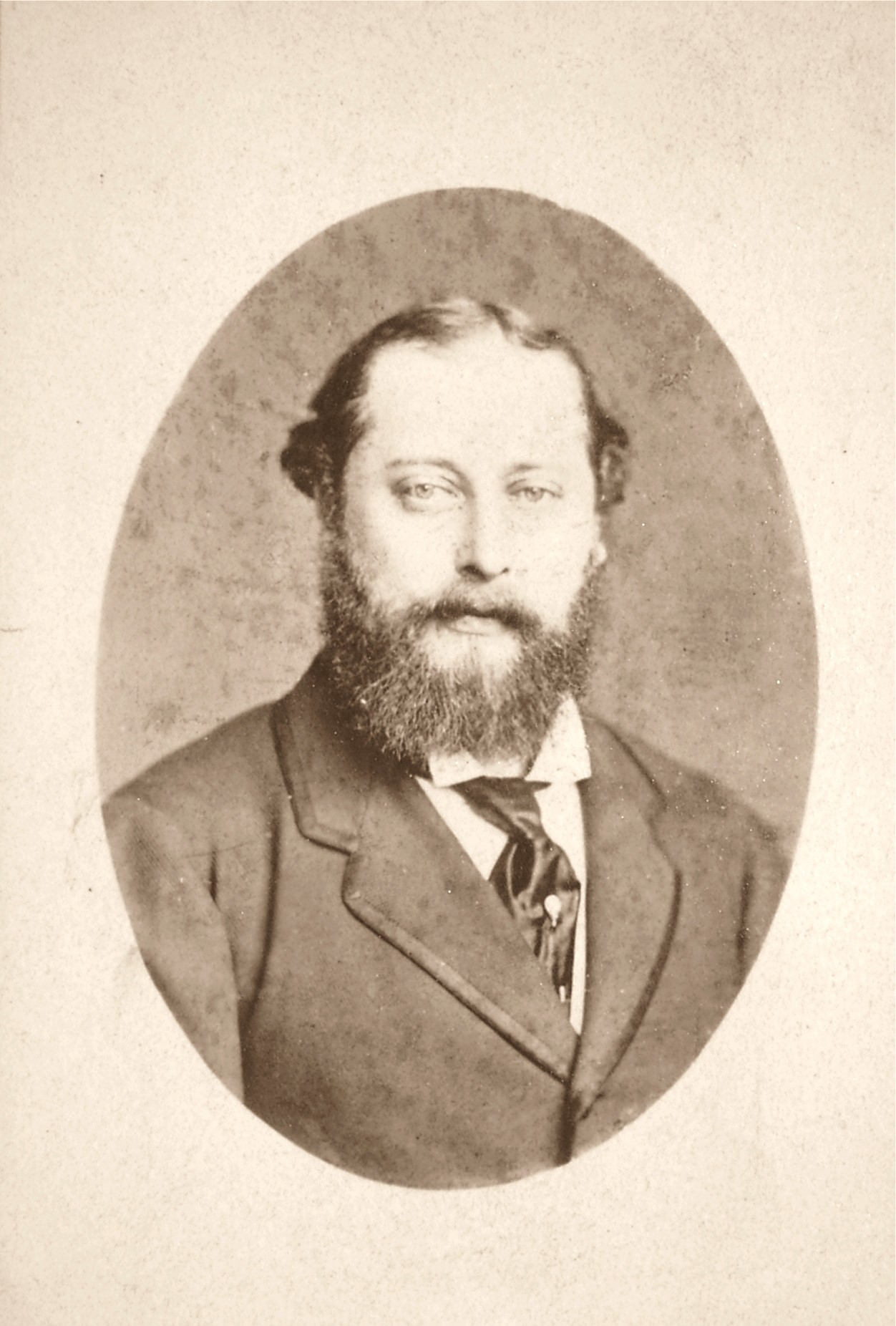
Thais's owner the Prince of Wales, later to become Edward VII

On 1 May Thais was one of 19 fillies to contest the 83rd running of the 1000 Guineas over the Rowley Mile at Newmarket and was made the 5/1 second favourite behind Omladina, a filly who had divided St Frusquin and Persimmon when running second in the Middle Park Plate. The best-fancied of the others were Lord Zetland's Jolly Boat, Douglas Baird's Santa Maura and the unnamed "sister to Ella Tweed". Ridden by John Watts, Thais took the lead a furlong out and won an "exciting race" by a neck from Santa Maura, with Jolly Boat three quarters of a length away in third place. As Thais and Santa Maura were racing on opposite sides of the wide course the finish was difficult to judge and many observers believed that the latter had won. The Royal victory was reportedly greeted by "cheers of the heartiest sort".

At Epsom Racecourse on 5 June Thais started 13/8 favourite against ten opponents for the Oaks Stakes over 1 1/2 miles. With Watts again in the saddle she looked the likely winner in the straight but was overtaken in the last quarter mile and was beaten two lengths into second place by Lord Derby's Canterbury Pilgrim. Richard Marsh explained his trainee's defeat by stating that the filly had refused to eat since leaving Newmarket and was "quite off-colour". In the Coronation Stakes over one mile at Royal Ascot later that month Thais finished in front of Canterbury Pilgrim but was beaten into second place by the Duke of Westminster's Helm, to whom she was conceding seven pounds.

On 28 October, carrying a weight of 112 pounds, Thais finished unplaced behind Winkfield's Pride in the Cambridgeshire Handicap at Newmarket.

== Breeding record ==
At the end of the 1896 season Thais was retired to become a broodmare at the Royal stud at Sandringham. She was barren when mated to Isinglass in 1897 and died in November 1898 of inflammation of the bowels before producing any offspring.

== Pedigree ==
Pedigree of Thais (GB), brown mare, 1893
Sire St Serf (GB) 1887	St Simon (GB); 1881	Galopin	Vedette
Sire St Serf (GB) 1887	St Simon (GB); 1881	Galopin	Flying Duchess
Sire St Serf (GB) 1887	St Simon (GB); 1881	St Angela	King Tom
Sire St Serf (GB) 1887	St Simon (GB); 1881	St Angela	Adeline
Sire St Serf (GB) 1887	Feronia (GB); 1868	Thormanby	Windhound
Sire St Serf (GB) 1887	Feronia (GB); 1868	Thormanby	Alice Hawthorn
Sire St Serf (GB) 1887	Feronia (GB); 1868	Woodbine	Stockwell
Sire St Serf (GB) 1887	Feronia (GB); 1868	Woodbine	Honeysuckle
Dam Poetry (GB) 1881	Petrarch (GB); 1873	Lord Clifden	Newminster
Dam Poetry (GB) 1881	Petrarch (GB); 1873	Lord Clifden	The Slave
Dam Poetry (GB) 1881	Petrarch (GB); 1873	Laura	Orlando
Dam Poetry (GB) 1881	Petrarch (GB); 1873	Laura	Torment
Dam Poetry (GB) 1881	Music (GB); 1866	Stockwell	The Baron
Dam Poetry (GB) 1881	Music (GB); 1866	Stockwell	Pocahontas
Dam Poetry (GB) 1881	Music (GB); 1866	One Act	Annandale
Dam Poetry (GB) 1881	Music (GB); 1866	One Act	Extravagana (Family 23-a)
