= Cherimoya (horse) =

British Thoroughbred racehorse

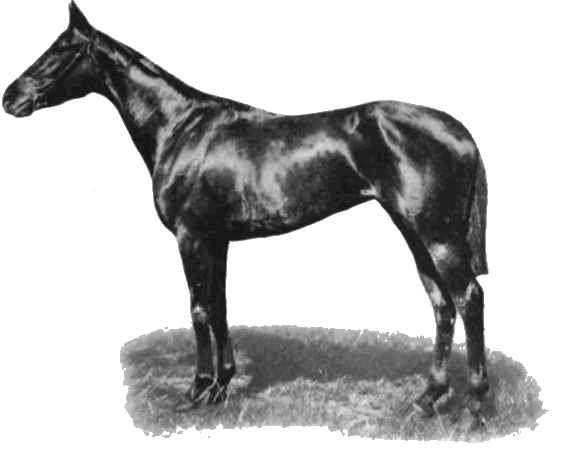
- Cherimoya in a 1911 photograph by William Albert Rouch.
- Sire: Cherry Tree
- Grandsire: Hampton
- Dam: Svelte
- Damsire: St. Simon
- Sex: Mare
- Foaled: 4 May 1908
- Country: United Kingdom
- Colour: Bay
- Breeder: William Broderick Cloete
- Owner: 1) William Broderick Cloete; 2) Sir Thomas Dewar
- Trainer: Charles Marsh
- Record: 1:1-0-0
- Earnings: £4950 ($24,750)

Major wins
- Epsom Oaks (1911)

Cherimoya (4 May 1908 – 1927) was a Thoroughbred racehorse that won the 1911 Epsom Oaks in the only start of her racing career. Cherimoya was bred and owned by South African mining magnate William Broderick Cloete, who was killed in 1915 during the sinking of Lusitania. Her most notable offspring were the fillies Sunny Moya and Una Cameron. Cherimoya was euthanised in 1927.

== Background ==
Cherimoya was bred by W. Broderick Cloete and was foaled on 4 May 1908 at his Hare Park estate near London. Cloete was a South African mining entrepreneur who had campaigned the 1885 2000 Guineas winner Paradox. Cherimoya's sire, Cherry Tree, was bred by Cloete and was sold as a yearling in 1892 to American turfman Marcus Daly for 4,000 guineas; Daly relocated him to his Bitterroot Stud in the Bitterroot Valley of Montana. He was named Matt Byrnes (after a noted horse trainer) in the United States and raced with some success. Cloete repurchased the horse from Daly for $25,000 in October 1897 and renamed him Cherry Tree. Cherimoya's dam, Svelte, was also bred by Cloete and was not a successful racehorse. She was exclusively bred to Cherry Tree whilst owned by Cloete, producing five full-siblings to Cherimoya.

Cherimoya was a described by The Sydney Morning Herald as a "fine, substantial, big boned filly."

== Racing career ==
Racing for Broderick Cloete, Cherimoya won The Oaks in the only official start of her racing career. Cloete's racing colours were a crimson shirt with black and white sleeves and a black cap. Cherimoya was trained by Charles Marsh at Newmarket and was a promising racehorse in her two-year-old trials. A few days before her anticipated first start at Sandown in the National Breeders' Produce Stakes, Cherimoya cut one of her fetlock joints after an exercise session when she was startled by a bird and fell over "a heap of stones" used for mending a nearby road. The injury prevented Cherimoya from competing the rest of the season and she was sidelined until her start in the Oaks.

=== 1911 Epsom Oaks ===
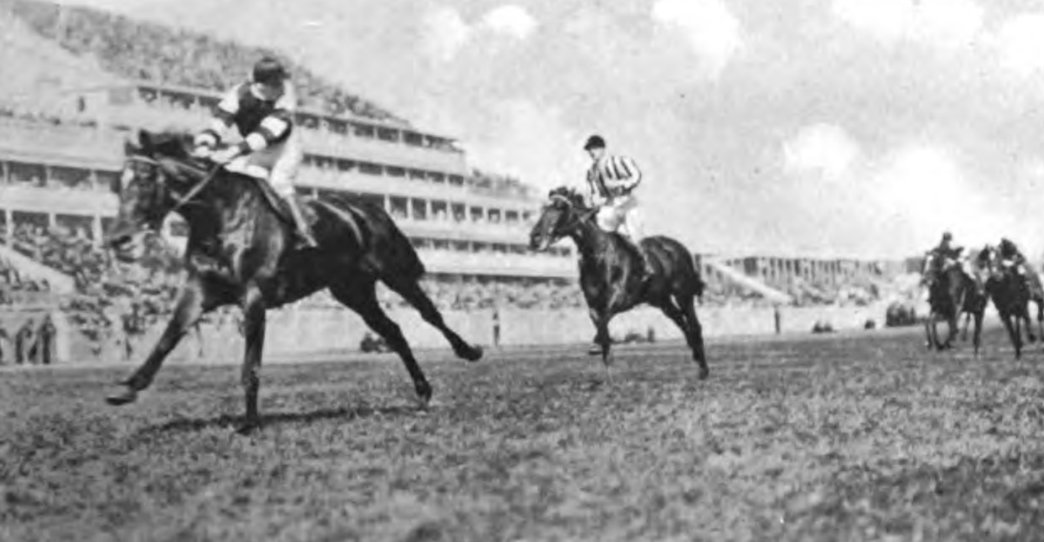
Cherimoya winning the 1911 Epsom Oaks in the first and only start of her racing career in a photograph taken by C.J. Waters. Second place finisher Tootles follows closely (second from left) in the background.

On 2 June, Cherimoya started in the Oaks Stakes in a field of 21 horses. Cherimoya held a good position from the start of the race, taking the lead a quarter of a mile from the finish and winning easily by three lengths over the betting favourite Tootles. Cherimoya was an unanticipated winner, factoring at 20 to 1 odds in the betting pools, and her win reportedly left "the spectators too dumbfounded to cheer." She was ridden by a 16-year-old apprentice jockey named Fred Winter, later a successful horse trainer and the father of champion jockey and trainer Fred Winter.

Cherimoya was entered in the St. James Stakes at Kempton Park held in August, but did not run in the race. The Times speculated that her absence was "in consequence of the hard ground" at the racecourse. The filly was withdrawn from further racing engagements in October 1911 due to trouble from "contracted feet." Cherimoya returned to training as a four-year-old, but injury again prevented her from running in the Coronation Stakes and Cesarewich Stakes. Cherimoya never raced again and was retired to Cloete's stud at Hare Park in 1913.

== Stud career ==
Cherimoya was retired in 1913 to Broderick Cloete's stud at Hare Park. Cloete was killed on 7 May 1915 while en route from Mexico to England during the attack and sinking of RMS Lusitania. After the death of Cloete, Cherimoya was sold for $11,500 in 1915 to Sir Thomas Dewar. The proprietors of the Wickliffe Stud, American turfmen James C. Corrigan and Price McKinney, were interested in purchasing Cherimoya but their bid via cablegram for the mare was delayed. By 1918, Cherimoya had been relocated to J.B. Joel's Childwickbury Stud in St. Albans, Hertfordshire. Cherimoya was euthanised in October 1927.

Cherimoya's most notable offspring were the fillies Sunny Moya (foaled in 1917 by Sunstar) and Una Cameron (foaled in 1922 by Gainsborough). Sunny Moya was a dam of the colts The Mac Nab and Sunny Trace. Una Cameron was the dam of the Epsom Derby winner Cameronian.

== Pedigree ==
Pedigree of Cherimoya (GB), Bay filly, 1908
Sire Cherry Tree (GB) Bay, 1891	Hampton; 1872	Lord Clifden	Newminster
Sire Cherry Tree (GB) Bay, 1891	Hampton; 1872	Lord Clifden	The Slave
Sire Cherry Tree (GB) Bay, 1891	Hampton; 1872	Lady Langden	Kettledrum
Sire Cherry Tree (GB) Bay, 1891	Hampton; 1872	Lady Langden	Haricot
Sire Cherry Tree (GB) Bay, 1891	Cherry; 1881	Sterling	Oxford
Sire Cherry Tree (GB) Bay, 1891	Cherry; 1881	Sterling	Whisper
Sire Cherry Tree (GB) Bay, 1891	Cherry; 1881	Cherry Duchess	The Duke
Sire Cherry Tree (GB) Bay, 1891	Cherry; 1881	Cherry Duchess	Mirella
Dam Svelte (GB) Bay, 1899	St. Simon; 1881	Galopin	Vedette
Dam Svelte (GB) Bay, 1899	St. Simon; 1881	Galopin	Flying Duchess
Dam Svelte (GB) Bay, 1899	St. Simon; 1881	St. Angela	King Tom
Dam Svelte (GB) Bay, 1899	St. Simon; 1881	St. Angela	Adeline
Dam Svelte (GB) Bay, 1899	Fine Lady; 1890	Isonomy	Sterling
Dam Svelte (GB) Bay, 1899	Fine Lady; 1890	Isonomy	Isola Bella
Dam Svelte (GB) Bay, 1899	Fine Lady; 1890	Sonsie Queen	Musket
Dam Svelte (GB) Bay, 1899	Fine Lady; 1890	Sonsie Queen	Highland Lassie
