= Diamond Jubilee (horse) =

British thoroughbred racehorse

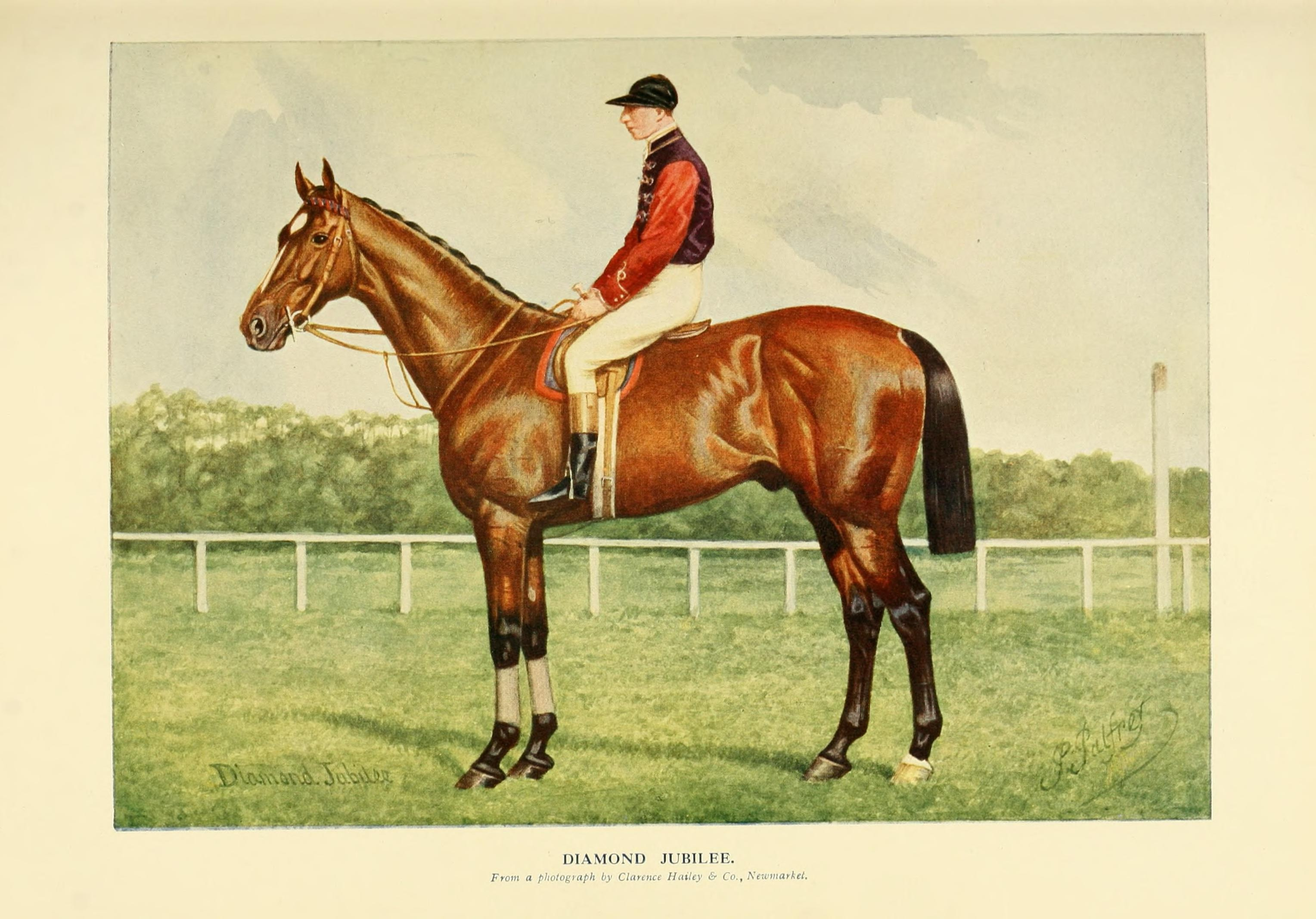
- Sire: St. Simon
- Grandsire: Galopin
- Dam: Perdita
- Damsire: Hampton
- Sex: Stallion
- Foaled: 1897
- Country: United Kingdom of Great Britain and Ireland
- Colour: Bay
- Breeder: Prince of Wales
- Owner: Prince of Wales; Duke of Devonshire (leased 1901)
- Trainer: Richard Marsh
- Record: 16:6-4-1
- Earnings: £28,185

Major wins
- 2000 Guineas (1900); Newmarket Stakes (1900); Epsom Derby (1900); Eclipse Stakes (1900); St. Leger (1900)

Awards
- 9th U.K. Triple Crown Champion (1900); Leading Sire in Argentina (1915, 1916, 1917, 1921)

Diamond Jubilee (1897 – 10 July 1923) was a British-bred and British-trained Thoroughbred race horse and sire. In a career which lasted from June 1899 until October 1901 he ran sixteen times and won six races.

He showed modest form as a two-year-old in 1899 but improved to be the leading colt of his generation in 1900 when he won the British Triple Crown. His other wins included the Eclipse Stakes, then one of the most valuable horse races in the world. He was retired to stud at the end of the 1901 season and was later exported to Argentina.

Diamond Jubilee was noted throughout his life for his unpredictable and sometimes violent temperament.

== Background ==
Diamond Jubilee was bred by his owner, the Prince of Wales, later King Edward VII. He was foaled in the year of the Diamond Jubilee of Queen Victoria.

Diamond Jubilee's sire, St. Simon was an undefeated racehorse who was considered one of the best British runners of the 19th Century. In an outstanding stud career he won nine sires’ championships, having sired ten Classic winners. Perdita, the dam of Diamond Jubilee was a successful racehorse who was bought by the Prince on the advice of John Porter. As a broodmare she produced, in addition to Diamond Jubilee, the 1896 Derby winner Persimmon and the Jockey Club Cup winner Florizel II. Such was the quality of Diamond Jubilee's pedigree, and the status of his owner, that his birth was noted in the press.

== Racing career ==
=== 1899: two-year-old season ===
Diamond Jubilee won only one of his six races as a two-year-old. He was strongly fancied to win the Coventry Stakes at Royal Ascot on 13 June, starting 6/5 favourite but finished unplaced behind the gelding Democrat, after behaving badly in the paddock and before the start. Among other unpleasant traits he kicked a spectator, delayed the start of the race by repeatedly "rearing" and attempted to attack and bite his own jockey, the highly experienced John Watts. In the July Stakes at Newmarket the "ramapagious beast" threw Watts and galloped free for several minutes prior to the start before finishing unplaced again. It was decided to replace Watts with Morny Cannon. Gelding the colt was also a possible solution, but a veterinary examination revealed that the colt had an undescended testicle, making the operation difficult and potentially dangerous. With Cannon as his jockey, Diamond Jubilee showed much improved form to finish second to Epsom Lad in a Prince of Wales's Stakes at Goodwood in late July, but even then his courage was questioned by critics who accused him of showing "the white feather."

In autumn, Diamond Jubilee ran three times at Newmarket. He recorded his first win when beating moderate opposition in the Boscawen Stakes, and was then moved back up into top class for the Middle Park Stakes on 13 October. He was on his best behaviour finished half a length second to Democrat, after which his trainer Richard Marsh was reported to have described him as "the winner of next year's Derby". On his final start of the year two weeks later, he finished second behind Democrat again in the Dewhurst Stakes, although he produced an improved effort and gave the winner a more difficult race on this occasion.

Despite his relatively modest form Diamond Jubilee was seen as a colt with Classic potential, partly because his pedigree suggested that he would improve with age and distance, whereas Democrat was regarded as essentially a precocious, sprinting type.

=== 1900: three-year-old season ===
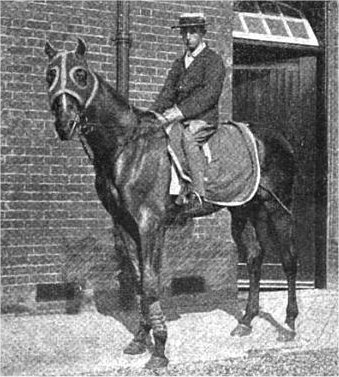
Diamond Jubilee with Herbert Jones, circa 1900

==== Spring: 2000 Guineas ====
Diamond Jubilee appeared to thrive during the winter of 1899–1900, and appeared to go particularly well in training for an inexperienced nineteen-year-old jockey named Herbert Jones. When the colt attempted to savage Morny Cannon after a training gallop, Marsh decided to give the ride to Jones. Diamond Jubilee's improved form became well known and when he made his seasonal reappearance in the 2000 Guineas on 2 May he was made 11/4 third favourite in a field of ten runners. He impressed observers before the race with his physical appearance and behaved impeccably. Ridden by Jones, he took the lead after two furlongs and was never in any danger of defeat. He won impressively by four lengths from Bonarosa and Sidus. Two weeks later he ran in the Newmarket Stakes over ten furlongs and started 1/2 favourite against five opponents. Diamond Jubilee took the lead soon after half way and won by a head from Chevening. The fact that Jones never had to use his whip suggested that the win was rather more comfortable than the narrow margin indicated.

==== Summer: Epsom Derby ====
At Epsom on 31 May, Diamond Jubilee started 6/4 favourite against twelve opponents, with Forfarshire second choice on 100/30. The crowd was reported to be smaller than usual, possibly because of the cold, windy weather. Jones tracked the leaders on the royal colt and turned into the straight disputing second place. Two furlongs from the finish, Jones sent Diamond Jubilee into the lead and he stayed on strongly to win by half a length from Simon Dale, with Disguise third. The royal victory was warmly received with the sky reportedly turning "black with hats" thrown into the air at the finish. Diamond Jubilee's winning time of 2:42.0 equalled the race record set by his brother Persimmon.

At Newmarket the colt started 4/5 favourite for the £10,000 Princess of Wales's Stakes over one mile on 5 July, for which as the Derby winner, he had to carry a weight penalty. He was unable to give twenty pounds to the filly Merry Gal, who led from the start and won by four lengths, but finished ahead of some good horses and was felt to have run creditably. On his next appearance he again had to carry a penalty in the ten furlong Eclipse Stakes at Sandown on 20 July. He produced his most impressive performance to date, taking the lead in the straight and winning decisively from Chevening, to whom he was conceding ten pounds. His winning time of 2:07.4 was a new course record.

==== Autumn: St Leger ====
On 12 September, Diamond Jubilee attempted to become the ninth horse to complete the Triple Crown in the St Leger at Doncaster. His temperamental problems returned to the fore as he sweated profusely and took twenty minutes to be saddled. In the race, for which he started 2/7 favourite, he led after half a mile and after being briefly challenged by Elopement in the straight, won easily by a length and a half. On his final start of the season, he ran in the Jockey Club Stakes at Newmarket. Once again, his behaviour caused problems as he delayed the race for several minutes by refusing to leave the paddock. On this occasion however, he was unable to reproduce his best form, and after racing prominently for part of the way, he dropped out in the closing stages and finished unplaced behind Disguise.

After the St Leger, Diamond Jubilee was described as "the undoubted champion of England". Although he was admired for his "bulldog courage" he was considered clearly inferior to his brother Persimmon. Diamond Jubilee's earnings of £27,985 were largely responsible for ensuring that the Prince of Wales was the leading owner, in terms of money won for the 1900 British season. He was also instrumental in securing the trainers' championship for Richard Marsh and the Sires' Championship for St. Simon

=== 1901: four-year-old season ===
When the Prince of Wales became King Edward VII in January 1901, he leased all his racehorses to the Duke of Devonshire for the rest of the year. Diamond Jubilee was reported to have made good progress over the winter and was expected to have another successful season.

Diamond Jubilee ran only three times, in three of the season's most valuable races (the "Ten Thousand Pounders"). He had some training problems in spring which affected his progress and his trainer was not optimistic when the royal colt made his first appearance. In the Princess of Wales's Stakes on 4 July he finished second to Epsom Lad, who was winning his first race since beating Diamond Jubilee as a two-year-old. In the Eclipse Stakes later in the month, Diamond Jubilee delayed the start with his familiar antics, but ran well to finish a close fourth in a "blanket finish" behind Epsom Lad, to whom he was conceding three pounds.

Diamond Jubilee ran his last race on 3 October at Newmarket when he finished third to Pietermaritzburg and Epsom Lad in the Jockey Club Stakes, after which he was retired to stud.

== Stud record ==
Diamond Jubilee began his stud career at standing at the Royal Studs at Sandringham, Norfolk, at a fee of 300 guineas. He was considered no more than a "qualified success" in England and late in 1905 he was sold for 30,000 guineas and exported to Argentina early the following year. The best of Diamond Jubilee's English-bred offspring were the colt Sancy (Prince of Wales's Stakes) and the filly Jubilee (Park Hill Stakes). In Argentina, Diamond Jubilee announced his arrival at the Haras las Ortigas by attempting to savage the stud manager, but settled down to become a highly successful second career, being the Champion sire in Argentina on four occasions (1914, 1915, 1916 and 1921). Diamond Jubilee retained his unpredictable temper until the end of his life. A few months before his death he escaped from the stud farm and galloped through the neighbouring town of Morón before being recaptured. He died in 1923 at the age of twenty-six.

== Sire line tree ==
- Diamond Jubilee
  - Bellerophon
  - Sancy
  - Queen's Advocate
  - Weber
  - Coup De Vent
  - As De Espadas
    - Pombiquet
  - Last Reason
    - Ardelion
    - Madrigal
  - Mustafa
    - Almodovar
    - Portos
    - Bombero
    - Urbion
  - Ricuarte
  - Smasher
  - Campanazo
    - Ripley
    - Sin Sabor
    - Sol Naciente
    - Samuray
    - Brown Price
  - Melik
  - Saca Chispas
  - Moloch
    - Caimican
    - Prinaldo
  - Mehemet Ali

== Pedigree ==
Pedigree of Diamond Jubilee (GB), bay stallion, 1897
Sire St Simon (GB) 1881	Galopin; 1872	Vedette	Voltigeur*^
Sire St Simon (GB) 1881	Galopin; 1872	Vedette	Mrs Ridgway
Sire St Simon (GB) 1881	Galopin; 1872	Flying Duchess	The Flying Dutchman
Sire St Simon (GB) 1881	Galopin; 1872	Flying Duchess	Merope
Sire St Simon (GB) 1881	St Angela; 1865	King Tom	Harkaway
Sire St Simon (GB) 1881	St Angela; 1865	King Tom	Pocahontas
Sire St Simon (GB) 1881	St Angela; 1865	Adeline	Ion
Sire St Simon (GB) 1881	St Angela; 1865	Adeline	Little Fairy
Dam Perdita (GB) 1881	Hampton; 1872	Lord Clifden	Newminster
Dam Perdita (GB) 1881	Hampton; 1872	Lord Clifden	The Slave^
Dam Perdita (GB) 1881	Hampton; 1872	Lady Langden	Kettledrum
Dam Perdita (GB) 1881	Hampton; 1872	Lady Langden	Haricot
Dam Perdita (GB) 1881	Hermione; 1875	Young Melbourne	Melbourne*^
Dam Perdita (GB) 1881	Hermione; 1875	Young Melbourne	Clarissa
Dam Perdita (GB) 1881	Hermione; 1875	La Belle Helene	St Albans
Dam Perdita (GB) 1881	Hermione; 1875	La Belle Helene	Teterrima (Family: 7)^

*^ Diamond Jubilee is inbred 4S x 5D to the stallion Voltigeur, meaning that he appears fourth generation on the sire side of his pedigree and fifth generation (via Teterrima)^ on the dam side of his pedigree.

*^ Diamond Jubilee is inbred 5D x 4D to the stallion Melbourne, meaning that he appears fifth generation (via The Slave)^ and fourth generation on the dam side of his pedigree.
