= Hare Hall =

Coordinates: 51°34′58″N 0°12′12″E

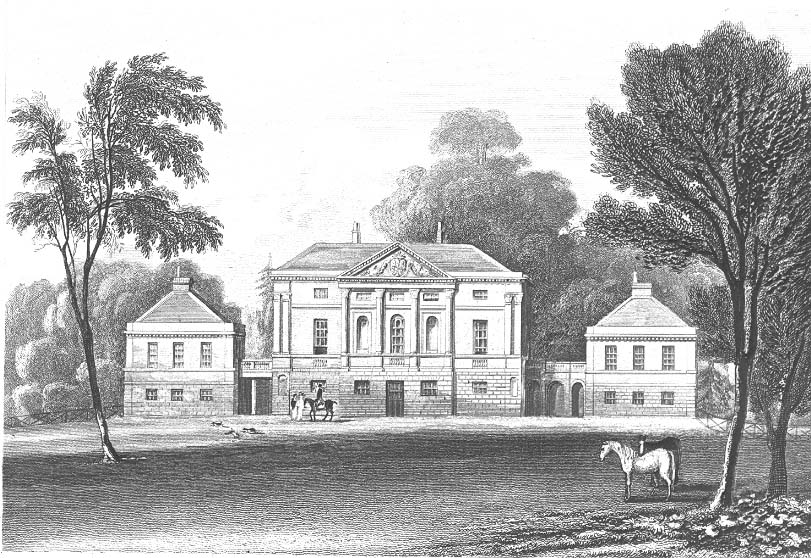
Hare Hall, engraved by J. Wallis after artist J.P. Neale, ca 1800

Hare Hall is a house and grounds located in Gidea Park in the London Borough of Havering, east London.

It was built in 1769–70 as a country house for John A. Wallinger and since 1921 has housed the Royal Liberty School.

The Palladian mansion was built to designs by James Paine, who included it in his published Plans. The main north front is of five bays, with a rusticated basement storey, above which the two upper storeys are unified by a giant portico and pilasters at the angles.

Attached to the south front by short corridors there were pavilions containing service rooms. The principal rooms were on the first floor, and were approached by a central staircase with curved ends and a wrought iron balustrade.

The main front was of Portland stone, but the south front was of red brick. In 1896 the house was considerably enlarged on that side by filling in the space between the pavilions.

At the stud maintained at Hare Park, Cherimoya, foaled in 1908, was bred by the South African mining entrepreneur and horseman William Broderick Cloete; after Cloete's death in the sinking of the Lusitania, during the First World War Hare Park became Hare Hall Camp and housed the 2nd Battalion of the Artists Rifles.
