= Challacombe (horse) =

British-bred Thoroughbred racehorse

- Sire: St Serf
- Grandsire: St Simon
- Dam: Lady Chancellor
- Damsire: Bona Vista
- Sex: Stallion
- Foaled: 1902
- Country: United Kingdom of Great Britain and Ireland
- Colour: Bay
- Breeder: F W Dunn
- Owner: Washington Singer
- Trainer: Alec Taylor Jr.
- Record: 17: 7-1-1
- Earnings: £6,847 (1905)

Major wins
- Union Jack Stakes (1905); St Leger (1905)

Challacombe (1902 – 8 January 1917) was a British Thoroughbred racehorse and sire. He showed little ability as a two-year-old, showing no worthwhile form in six starts. In the following year he made steady progress, winning seven races, culminating with an upset victory in the St Leger Stakes. He was subsequently retired to stud but had no success as a sire of winners.

== Background ==
Challacombe was a bay horse with a white star bred by F W Dunn. As a yearling he was put up for auction at Doncaster and was bought for 570 guineas by Alec Taylor Jr. on behalf of the American-born Washington Singer. Taylor, who trained the horse at Manton, Wiltshire, later expressed his disappointment that the colt had never been entered in the Epsom Derby. The horse was named after a small village in Devon.

He was sired by St Serf who won the Rous Memorial Stakes and went on to sire several other good horses included the 1000 Guineas winner Thais. Challacombe's dam Lady Chancellor was a distant, female-line descendant of the dam of the Epsom Oaks winner Nike.

== Racing career ==
=== 1904: two-year-old season ===
Until 1946 two-year-old racehorses in Britain did not have to be given official names and the colt who was to become Challacombe raced unnamed as a juvenile in 1904. The colt made no impact, as he failed to win or place in any of his six races.

=== 1905: three-year-old season ===
The still unnamed colt returned in the spring of 1905 and began to make steady progress. He won the Union Jack Stakes over one mile at Liverpool in April and the Wood Ditton Stakes at Newmarket Racecourse later that month. In May he followed up by taking the Tudor Plate at Sandown Park and the Chippenham Plate over 1 1/2 miles at Newmarket. At Royal Ascot in June he finished unplaced in both the Gold Vase and the Triennial Stakes. In July he ran for the first time under the name Challacombe and won the Coombe Plate over one mile at Sandown Park. Later that month he was moved up in class for the Duchess of York Plate over ten furlongs at Hurst Park he finished third behind the Oaks winner Cherry Lass. The colt returned to Hurst Park in August and finished second to Costly Lady in the Holiday Plate. On his final race before contesting the St Leger Challacombe contested the weight-for-age Newdigate Stakes over 1 1/2 miles at Gatwick Racecourse in early September, and won "very easily" from the four-year-old St Denis.

130th running of the St Leger over 14 1/2 furlongs at Doncaster Racecourse on 13 September was much anticipated as the field was expected to include the season's three outstanding three-year-olds, Cicero, Val d'Or and Cherry Lass. When Cicero was withdrawn with a leg injury, and Val d'Or was prevented from crossing the English Channel from France by rough weather, Cherry Lass became the clear favourite. The race was run in wet and "dismal" conditions but nevertheless attracted the customary huge crowd. Cherry Lass went off at odds of 6/4 ahead of Llangibby (third to Val d'Or and Cicero in the Eclipse Stakes) and Polymelus with Challacombe, ridden by Otto Madden the 16/1 fourth choice in an eight-runner field. It was reported that Challacombe, who was equipped with blinkers, had been considered unlikely to run in the race until the withdrawals of Cicero and Val d'Or. Challacombe was not among the early leaders but drew alongside the tiring Cherry Lass in the straight before pulling away to win "easily" by three lengths from Polymelus with the favourite three lengths back in third place. The winning time of 3:05.4 was a new record for the race.

Challacombe ended the year with earnings of £6,847 making him the sixth most financially successful horse of the season.

=== 1906: four-year-old season ===
Challacombe remained in training as a four-year-old but failed to win any major races.

== Assessment and honours ==
In their book, A Century of Champions, based on the Timeform rating system, John Randall and Tony Morris rated Challacombe an "average" winner of the St Leger.

== Stud record ==
Challacombe retired from racing to become a breeding stallion but had no success as a sire of winners. Challacombe was euthanised on 8 January 1917.

== Pedigree ==
Pedigree of Challacombe (GB), bay stallion, 1902
Sire St Serf (GB) 1887	St Simon (GB); 1881	Galopin	Vedette
Sire St Serf (GB) 1887	St Simon (GB); 1881	Galopin	Flying Duchess
Sire St Serf (GB) 1887	St Simon (GB); 1881	St Angela	King Tom*^
Sire St Serf (GB) 1887	St Simon (GB); 1881	St Angela	Adeline
Sire St Serf (GB) 1887	Feronia (GB); 1868	Thormanby*^	Windhound*^
Sire St Serf (GB) 1887	Feronia (GB); 1868	Thormanby*^	Alice Hawthorn*^
Sire St Serf (GB) 1887	Feronia (GB); 1868	Woodbine	Stockwell
Sire St Serf (GB) 1887	Feronia (GB); 1868	Woodbine	Honeysuckle
Dam Lady Chancellor (GB) 1895	Bona Vista (GB); 1889	Bend Or	Doncaster
Dam Lady Chancellor (GB) 1895	Bona Vista (GB); 1889	Bend Or	Rouge Rose^
Dam Lady Chancellor (GB) 1895	Bona Vista (GB); 1889	Vista	Macaroni
Dam Lady Chancellor (GB) 1895	Bona Vista (GB); 1889	Vista	Verdure^
Dam Lady Chancellor (GB) 1895	Lady Cecil (GB); 1886	Ossian	Salvator
Dam Lady Chancellor (GB) 1895	Lady Cecil (GB); 1886	Ossian	Music
Dam Lady Chancellor (GB) 1895	Lady Cecil (GB); 1886	True Blue	Oxford
Dam Lady Chancellor (GB) 1895	Lady Cecil (GB); 1886	True Blue	Smilax (Family 32)

*^ Challacombe is inbred 3S x 5D to the stallion Thormanby, meaning that he appears third generation on the sire side of his pedigree and fifth generation (via Rogue Rose)^ on the dam side of his pedigree.

*^ Challacombe is inbred 4S x 5D to the stallion King Tom, meaning that he appears fourth generation on the sire side of his pedigree and fifth generation (via Verdure)^ on the dam side of his pedigree.
