= Jeddah (horse) =

British Thoroughbred racehorse

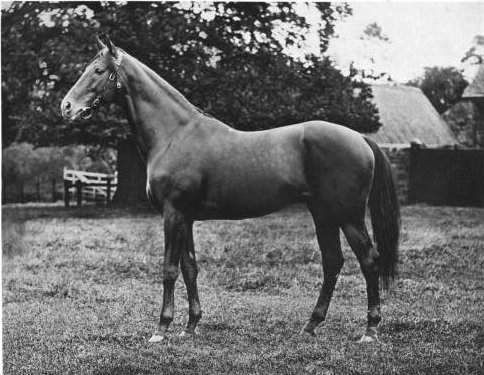
- Jeddah, circa 1906, as photographed by Clarence Hailey.
- Sire: Janissary
- Grandsire: Isonomy
- Dam: Pilgrimage
- Damsire: The Earl or The Palmer
- Sex: Stallion
- Foaled: 1895
- Country: United Kingdom of Great Britain and Ireland
- Colour: Chestnut
- Breeder: James Larnach
- Owner: James Larnach
- Trainer: Richard Marsh
- Record: 9: 3-3-0
- Earnings: £

Major wins
- Craven Stakes (1898); Epsom Derby (1898); Prince of Wales's Stakes (1898)

Jeddah (1895–1909) was a British Thoroughbred racehorse and sire. In a career that lasted from 1897 to 1899 he ran nine times and won three races. In the summer of 1898 he became the first horse to win The Derby at odds of 100/1, and followed up by winning the Prince of Wales's Stakes at Royal Ascot. He was retired to stud after a single, unsuccessful race in 1899, but had serious fertility problems and made no impact as a stallion.

== Background ==
Jeddah, a big, leggy chestnut horse standing 16.3 hands high, was bred at by his owner James Walker Larnach. at his Eaton Stud. His sire Janissary was an extremely well-bred colt who won the St James’s Palace Stakes in 1880, but, apart from Jeddah, had little success at stud. Jeddah’s dam, Pilgrimage was an exceptional racemare who won both the 1000 Guineas and 2000 Guineas in 1878. She had also been successful as a broodmare but had failed to produce a foal for several seasons and was thought to be barren, enabling James Larnach to buy her in 1894 for 160 guineas. Surprisingly, she proved to be in foal, and produced Jeddah, described by a groom at the stud as “biggest and weakest” foal he had ever seen, in the following year at the age of twenty. Pilgrimage died at the age of twenty-three, on the day that Jeddah won the Derby. Jeddah was sent into training with the royal trainer Richard Marsh at his Egerton House stable at Newmarket, Suffolk.

== Racing career ==
=== 1897: two-year-old season ===
Jeddah was very backward (immature) at two, and did not appear on the racecourse until the autumn of 1897 when he ran twice at Newmarket in October. On his debut he finished second to Orzil, who was conceding nine pounds in the Clearwell Stakes. Just over two weeks later he ran in the Free Handicap. Carrying 112 pounds he started 4/1 favourite and finished second again, beaten a head by Meta.

=== 1898: three-year-old season ===
Jeddah recorded his first victory on his three-year-old debut on 15 April when he started 2/1 favourite for the Craven Stakes and won by a length from Schonberg. The opposition was not strong but he won impressively to establish himself as a contender for the 2000 Guineas two weeks later. In the Newmarket Classic on 27 April he started 6/1 third favourite and finished fifth behind Disraeli. He was moved up to ten furlongs for his next start, but finished fifth again in the Newmarket Stakes on 11 May behind the easy winner Cyllene, a colt who had not been entered in the classics. Jeddah was "in trouble all the way" and looked a most unlikely Derby contender.

Jeddah was given little chance in the Derby at Epsom on 25 May, and started at 100/1 in a field of eighteen. He was ridden in the race, his first outside Newmarket, by Herbert "Otto" Madden, who was in the process of winning his first Championship. Jeddah was held up towards the rear of the field in the early stages as the 2/1 favourite, Disraeli made the running. Disraeli weakened soon after half way and Batt led the field into the straight. Madden moved Jeddah steadily forward into third place before making his challenge two furlongs out. He overtook the Batt inside the final furlong and won by three quarters of a length after a "game struggle", with another 100/1 outsider, Dunlop, finishing third. The win for the "free-striding giant" was greeted in "solemn silence" by the "dumbfounded" crowd.

At Royal Ascot, Jeddah, ridden by John Watts, improved on his Derby-winning performance in the Prince of Wales's Stakes by giving six pounds to Batt and beating him "without an effort" by five lengths. Jeddah was then trained for the St Leger at Doncaster but his preparation was seriously disrupted by an injury to a suspensory ligament. No official announcement of the injury was made, but Jeddah's performance in a public exercise was unimpressive and his odds drifted out from 2/5 two days before the race to 5/6 at the start. Jeddah tracked the leaders before Watts sent him into a clear lead early in the straight, but he was caught a furlong from the finish and beaten four lengths by Wildfowler. It was suggested after the race that Jeddah had been unable to extend himself on the hard ground.

=== 1899: four-year-old season ===
Jeddah stayed in training at four, but became increasingly difficult to train, with his left foreleg causing particular problems. He was not seen on a racecourse until September 28, when he ran in the Jockey Club Stakes at Newmarket. He looked "big, muscular and fresh" in the paddock, but failed to recapture his old form and finished seventh of the eight runners behind Flying Fox.

== Assessment ==
At the end of 1898, Jeddah was regarded as probably the second best colt of his generation behind Cyllene.

== Stud career ==
Jeddah’s stud career was a complete failure. He had fertility problems and sired few foals, none of which became racehorses of any note. His last recorded foals were conceived in 1908. Jeddah died on 9 March 1909, and was buried at the Lanwades Hall, Newmarket.

== Pedigree ==
Pedigree of Jeddah (GB), chestnut stallion, 1895
Sire Janissary (GB) 1887	Isonomy; 1875	Sterling	Oxford
Sire Janissary (GB) 1887	Isonomy; 1875	Sterling	Whisper
Sire Janissary (GB) 1887	Isonomy; 1875	Isola Bella	Stockwell*
Sire Janissary (GB) 1887	Isonomy; 1875	Isola Bella	Isoline
Sire Janissary (GB) 1887	Jannette; 1875	Lord Clifden	Newminster
Sire Janissary (GB) 1887	Jannette; 1875	Lord Clifden	The Slave*
Sire Janissary (GB) 1887	Jannette; 1875	Chevisaunce	Stockwell*
Sire Janissary (GB) 1887	Jannette; 1875	Chevisaunce	Paradigm
Dam Pilgrimage (GB) 1875	The Palmer	Beadsman	Weatherbit
Dam Pilgrimage (GB) 1875	The Palmer	Beadsman	Mendicant
Dam Pilgrimage (GB) 1875	The Palmer	Madame Eglentine	Cowl
Dam Pilgrimage (GB) 1875	The Palmer	Madame Eglentine	Diversion
Dam Pilgrimage (GB) 1875	Lady Audley; 1867	Macaroni	Sweetmeat
Dam Pilgrimage (GB) 1875	Lady Audley; 1867	Macaroni	Jocose
Dam Pilgrimage (GB) 1875	Lady Audley; 1867	Secret	Melbourne*
Dam Pilgrimage (GB) 1875	Lady Audley; 1867	Secret	Mystery (Family: 1-g)

* Jeddah is inbred 4S x 4S to the stallion Stockwell, meaning that he appears fourth generation twice on the sire side of his pedigree.

* Jeddah is inbred 5S x 4D to the stallion Melbourne, meaning that he appears fifth generation (via The Slave) on the sire side of his pedigree, and fourth generation on the dam side of his pedigree.
