= Lost Nigger Gold Mine =

Legendary mine in American folklore

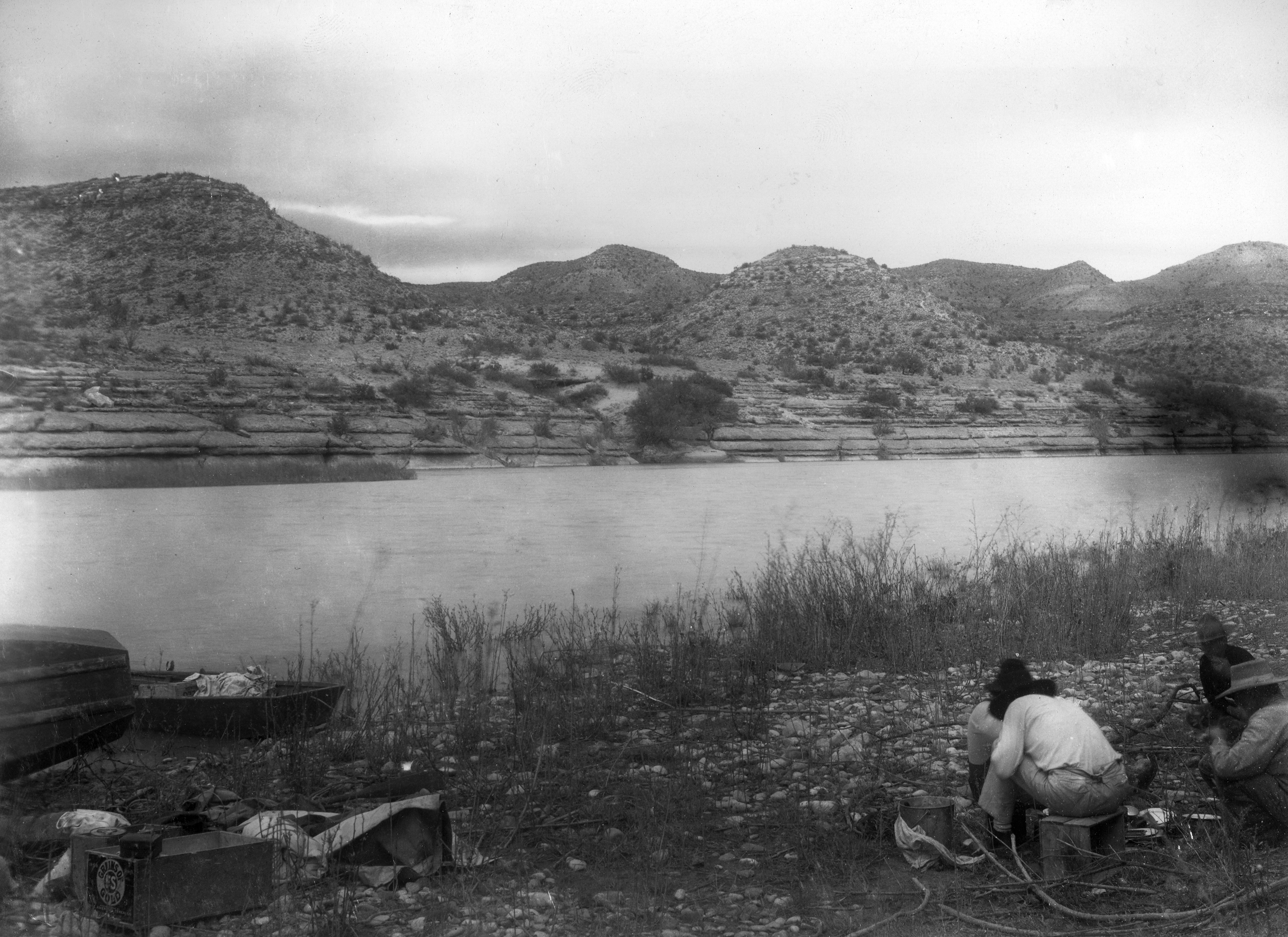
The Rio Grande, where Kelly's body was allegedly dumped.

The Lost Nigger Gold Mine is a legendary mine in the folklore of the United States. According to the legend, in 1887 four brothers in Dryden, Texas—Frank, Jim, John, and Lee Reagan—hired an illiterate Seminole named William Kelly to help with work on their ranch. Kelly was known as "Nigger Bill" (nigger being a term for a multiracial person in the slang of the Big Bend region) and has been identified as a cook and also as a horse wrangler; at the time of his employment by the Reagans, he was only 14. While working on the ranch, Kelly announced that he had discovered a gold mine, and was "greeted only with jeers". The next day he again tried to tell the Reagans about the mine, even going so far as to show them a lump of gold ore, but received a "cussing out" for his trouble.

After this rejection, Kelly went to San Antonio, where he knew a white assayer, and asked him to analyze the ore. Stories then conflict: One account states that he returned to Dryden, where the Reagans received a letter addressed to him that confirmed the gold was immensely valuable, and then killed him and dumped his body in the Rio Grande. The other states that, shortly after returning, he "borrowed" a horse and fled. Whatever the case, the Reagans dedicated their lives to attempting to find the mine; one report from 1930 claims that the three Reagans alive at that point had still not given up on their search. As well as the Reagans, many other expeditions set out in search of the mine; the legend has it that, while some explorers did discover it, they always died before they could make a profit or pass on the information.

One of the more serious searches was instigated by William Broderick Cloete, a British mine owner who believed in the story so completely that he offered Lock Campbell, a Texan man, expenses of $10,000 if he would undertake an expedition to find it. On July 19, 1899, Campbell and four other men signed an agreement to search for it, and one of the men later claimed to have discovered it in the Ladrones Mountains in New Mexico, but this was never verified. In 1909, an Oklahoman named Wattenberg traveled to Alpine, Texas, with a map that he claimed showed the mine to be in Mexico; a pioneer named John Young went so far as to enter into partnership with Wattenberg and secure a mining permit from Porfirio Díaz, only to spend years fruitlessly trying to find it. These failures have led to debates as to what happened to the mine. Young himself believed that it had been deliberately hidden by prospectors following Kelly; another theory is that the gold was not actually gold ore, but instead pieces of refined gold left by the Spanish. A third theory is that the gold was dropped by a group of Mexicans fleeing the rurales, who were forced to abandon it because it was slowing them down. Another is that, as the gold mine was allegedly in a canyon, gravel could have washed down and hidden it from view.

== Bibliography ==
- Braddy, Haldeen (1945). "A Legend of the Lost Nigger Gold Mine". California Folklore Quarterly. 4 (4). Western States Folklore Society: 359–363. doi:10.2307/1495620. ISSN 1556-1283. JSTOR 1495620.
- Dobie, James Frank (1978). Coronado's Children: Tales of Lost Mines and Buried Treasures of the Southwest. University of Texas Press. ISBN 978-0-292-71052-8.
- "New Search for Lost Gold: Amateur Prospectors Follow Legends in Hunt for Millions in Buried Treasure". Ebony. 15 (6). April 1960. ISSN 0012-9011.
- Porter, Kenneth W. (1954). "Willie Kelley of the Lost Nigger Mine". Western Folklore. 13 (1). Western States Folklore Society: 13–26. doi:10.2307/1496768. ISSN 0043-373X. JSTOR 1496768.
