= Paradox (horse) =

British-bred Thoroughbred racehorse

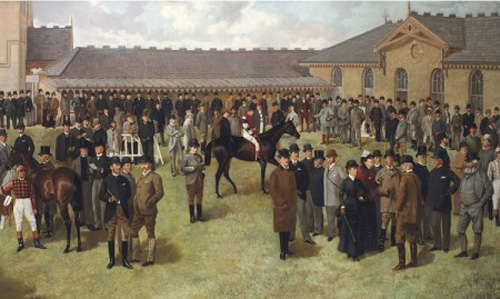
- Paradox in the centre of The Birdcage at Newmarket on 2000 Guineas Day by Lowes Cato Dickinson.
- Sire: Sterling
- Grandsire: Oxford
- Dam: Casuistry
- Damsire: The Miner
- Sex: Stallion
- Foaled: 1882
- Country: United Kingdom
- Colour: Bay
- Breeder: Graham brothers
- Owner: Hugh Grosvenor, 1st Duke of Westminster; William Broderick Cloete
- Trainer: John Porter; Richard Marsh
- Record: 8:6-1-1

Major wins
- Dewhurst Plate (1884); 2,000 Guineas (1885); Grand Prix de Paris (1885); Sussex Stakes (1885); Champion Stakes (1885)

Paradox (1882–1890) was a British Thoroughbred racehorse and sire. In a career that lasted from October 1884 until October 1885 he ran eight times and won six races. Despite running only twice in 1884, he proved himself to be one of the best two-year-olds of his generation by winning the Dewhurst Plate. In the following year he won five of his six races including the 2,000 Guineas, the Grand Prix de Paris, the Sussex Stakes and the Champion Stakes. His only defeat came when he was narrowly beaten by Melton in The Derby.

The final phase of the colt's racing career was marked by controversy and recrimination following his withdrawal from the Cambridgeshire Handicap in the autumn of 1885 and he was retired from racing in 1886. Paradox had little opportunity to establish himself at stud, dying in 1890 at the age of eight.

== Background ==
Paradox was a strongly-built bay horse bred by the Graham brothers at the Yardley Stud near Birmingham. He was sired by the 2,000 Guineas runner-up Sterling out of Casuistry, an undistinguished racehorse who had been sold cheaply at the end of her racing career by Lord Rosebery. Casuistry became an important broodmare, being the direct female ancestor of notable thoroughbreds such as Humorist, Royal Palace and Spend a Buck. As a yearling Paradox was bought for 700 guineas by the trainer John Porter on behalf of his associate, Captain Bowling. Porter trained the colt at his stable at Kingsclere.

== Racing career ==
=== 1884: two-year-old season ===
Until 1946 there was no requirement for British racehorses to be named and, in 1884, the horse who would become known as Paradox raced as "bay colt by Sterling- Casuistry" or, simply, "the Casuistry colt". He was slow to mature but, by late 1884, he had begun to show signs of promise. After watching him run in a trial gallop, the Duke of Westminster paid £6,000 (equivalent to £644,626 today) for the colt. By way of comparison, the 1884 Epsom Derby carried prize money of £4,600. By the time he appeared on a racecourse his performances in training and purchase price meant that he had acquired a considerable reputation and, despite making his debut in the Middle Park Plate, the season's most important races for two-year-olds, he was made joint-favourite at odds of 9/4. The inexperienced Casuistry colt showed "a little temper" at the start and, after racing with the leaders in the early stages, he became unbalanced and lost his position on the downhill section of the course. He finished strongly to dead-heat for third place behind Melton and the French colt Xaintrailes, but the Duke was highly displeased by the performance and offered the colt for sale. He was bought by William Broderick Cloete, a South African-born businessman who had made his fortune in Mexican coal-mining. At the next Newmarket meeting, on his first start for his new owner, the Casuistry colt ran in the Dewhurst Plate and started the 2/1 second favourite behind Xaintrailles. He took an early lead and pulled away in "grand style" to record a three length win from the filly Cora. The Dewhurst was regarded as the year's most important two-year-old race after the Middle Park Plate, and the colt's win established him as one of the best horses of his generation, with bookmakers making him one of the favourites for the following year's Derby. Shortly afterwards it was reported that an offer of £10,000 for the colt had been turned down.

=== 1885: three-year-old season ===
==== Spring ====
Over the winter the Casuistry colt was given the name "Paradox" (misreported as "Paragon" in some sources) and, by early 1885, was clear favourite for both the 2,000 Guineas and The Derby. When he reappeared in the 2,000 Guineas over one mile at Newmarket on 6 May he was considered virtually unbeatable and, with only six other colts turning out to oppose him, he started at odds of 1/3. Ridden by Fred Archer, Paradox started well and moved into the lead with three furlongs to travel. Most of his opponents were soon struggling, but an unnamed "bay colt by Kisber out of Chopette" (later named Crafton) emerged as a serious challenger. Archer had to use his spurs on Paradox and the favourite drifted across the course under pressure before prevailing by a head after a "brilliant and exciting" race. It was only after some animated discussion that Crafton's connections decided not to lodge an objection against the winner for causing interference in the closing stages.

==== Summer ====
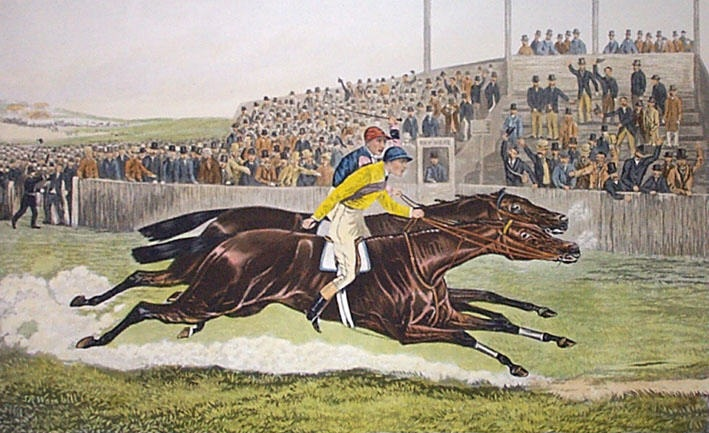
The 1885 Derby, Paradox is beaten by Melton

Despite his win in the Guineas, Paradox was passed over by Archer, who chose to ride Melton in the Derby. At Epsom on 3 June Paradox, ridden by Fred Webb, was made the 4/1 second favourite in a field of twelve runners, with Melton starting the 15/8 favourite. Webb was given the ride despite "scurrilous" rumours concerning his honesty. The race took place in fine weather before a reportedly "enormous" crowd that included the Prince and Princess of Wales. Paradox took the lead two furlongs from the finish and was immediately challenged by Archer on Melton; from that point on the two had the race between them. Melton made gradual but relentless progress to catch Paradox "in the last stride" and win by a head in a "desperate finish", with Archer riding one of his strongest races. After the race Cloete expressed his satisfaction with Webb's performance and rewarded the jockey with a gift of £100. Irish writer Oscar Wilde was reported to have observed "I understand that Milton's Paradise Lost is being revived and will appear in Derby Week and will be published under the title Paradox Lost by Melton."

Paradox was never beaten again. Eleven days after his defeat at Epsom he was sent to Longchamp to contest the Grand Prix de Paris, the most important and valuable race in France. The start of the race was delayed for half an hour as the authorities struggled to clear spectators from the course. Ridden once again by Archer, Paradox was restrained in the early stages before making steady progress and turning into the straight in second place. Paradox overtook the leader Reluisant halfway down the straight and won "[w]ith the greatest ease" at odds of 1/3. His success was greeted enthusiastically by the travelling British supporters but there were hisses and hoots from the French contingent and the raising of the Union Jack after the race led to what was described as an "unfavourable demonstration". Paradox returned to England and ran the one mile Sussex Stakes at Goodwood on 29 July. The winners of major races were assigned additional weight in the race and Paradox carried twelve pounds extra as a result of his success in France. Archer sent him to the front two furlongs from the finish and he won comfortably by three quarters of a length from Royal Hampton.

==== Autumn ====
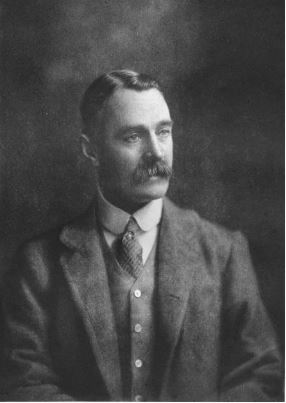
William Broderick Cloete

Later in the year Paradox was campaigned at Newmarket and entered in three races; his main target was expected to be the Cambridgeshire Handicap at the end of October. He was assigned a weight of 124 pounds and was strongly supported in the betting. Some time before the race, however, Cloete arrived in England from Mexico and had a disagreement with Porter that resulted in the withdrawal of Paradox from the Cambridgeshire, causing a "terrible rumpus" among the betting public. It was rumoured that Cloete was furious that he had not been kept informed of the trainer's plans and had missed the chance to bet on Paradox at long odds. It was also suggested that he was upset by accusations that Paradox had never been an intended runner and had been left in the race in an attempt to manipulate the betting market. An exacerbating factor in the affair was that there had been a delay between Cloete privately announcing that the horse would not run and the official withdrawal, during which period heavy gambling continued, with some individuals apparently profiting from inside knowledge. Cloete removed Paradox, and all of his other horses, from Porter's stable and sent them to be trained by Richard Marsh at Lordship Farm.

At the first October meeting Paradox ran the Champion Stakes over ten furlongs, with Archer riding at his lowest weight of 120 pounds. Running in wet, difficult conditions, Paradox took the lead in the closing stages and won from Duke of Richmond and the filly Aveline. His victory was received in silence by the spectators, although there were none of the open displays of hostility towards Cloete that been feared following the controversy arising from the colt's withdrawal from the Cambridgeshire. At the next Newmarket meeting, when the Cambridgeshire was run, Cloete rerouted his colt to the Free Handicap. Paradox won, despite conceding thirty-four pounds to Aveline, but his "brilliant" success was again met with silence from the crowd and Cloete was greeted "without a word of congratulation or the semblance of a note of enthusiasm". Paradox remained in training as a four-year-old with his entries including the Ascot Gold Cup, but he did not run again and was retired to stud.

== Stud career ==
Paradox began his stud career, during which he became increasingly bad-tempered and difficult to manage, at a fee of 30 guineas. He showed some promise as a stallion, siring several winners including Red Ensign (Prince of Wales's Stakes), Unicorne (Stewards' Cup) and Alconbury (Hansa Preis), and his stud fee had risen to 100 guineas by 1890 when he died of a twisted intestine at the age of eight. His daughter Thankful Blossom was the ancestor of Bull Lea, an American stallion referred to as "one of the great sires in American Thoroughbred history",.

== Sire line tree ==
- Paradox
  - Unicorne
  - Red Ensign
  - Alconbury
    - Frodi

== Pedigree ==
Pedigree of Paradox (GB), bay stallion, 1882
Sire Sterling (GB) 1868	Oxford; 1857	Birdcatcher*	Sir Hercules*
Sire Sterling (GB) 1868	Oxford; 1857	Birdcatcher*	Guiccioli*
Sire Sterling (GB) 1868	Oxford; 1857	Honey Dear	Plenipotentiary
Sire Sterling (GB) 1868	Oxford; 1857	Honey Dear	My Dear
Sire Sterling (GB) 1868	Whisper; 1857	Flatcatcher	Touchstone*
Sire Sterling (GB) 1868	Whisper; 1857	Flatcatcher	Decoy
Sire Sterling (GB) 1868	Whisper; 1857	Silence	Melbourne
Sire Sterling (GB) 1868	Whisper; 1857	Silence	Secret
Dam Casuistry (GB) 1875	The Miner; 1861	Rataplan	The Baron*
Dam Casuistry (GB) 1875	The Miner; 1861	Rataplan	Pocahontas*
Dam Casuistry (GB) 1875	The Miner; 1861	Manganese	Birdcatcher*
Dam Casuistry (GB) 1875	The Miner; 1861	Manganese	Moonbeam
Dam Casuistry (GB) 1875	Lady Caroline; 1861	Orlando	Touchstone*
Dam Casuistry (GB) 1875	Lady Caroline; 1861	Orlando	Vulture
Dam Casuistry (GB) 1875	Lady Caroline; 1861	Lady Blanche	Stockwell*
Dam Casuistry (GB) 1875	Lady Caroline; 1861	Lady Blanche	Clementina (Family:1-s)

* Paradox is inbred 3S x 5D x 4D to the stallion Birdcatcher, meaning that he appears third generation on the sire side of his pedigree, and fifth generation (via The Baron) and fourth generation on the dam side of his pedigree.

* Paradox is inbred 4S x 4D to the stallion Touchstone, meaning that he appears fourth generation on the sire side of his pedigree, and fourth generation on the dam side of his pedigree.

* Paradox is inbred 4D x 5D to the mare Pocahontas, meaning that she appears fourth generation and fifth generation (via Stockwell) on the dam side of his pedigree.
