= William Broderick Cloete =

British businessman

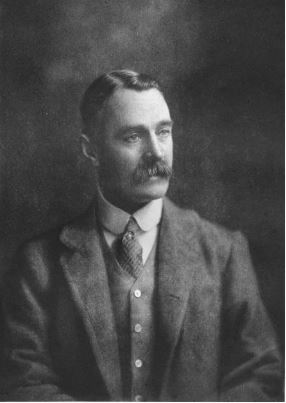

William Broderick Cloete (1851 – 7 May 1915) was a Cape Colony-born British industrialist active in the border zones between Mexico and the United States in the late 19th century.

== Career ==
He and Robert Symon, an industrialist from Boston, purchased 1.3 million acres of land between Monterrey and Saltillo, which constituted the only workable railway route between Monterrey and the interior of Mexico. After the Mexican National Construction Company chose to plot the Mexican National Railroad across this land, Symon sold his stake for $60,000 to a group of British investors incorporated as the San Marcos and Pinos company, while Cloete – who gained an additional advantage from land ownership, since the railway would access several mines he owned – retained his stake, eventually becoming a director of the new company.

Cloete is also noted for his belief in the legend of the Lost Nigger Gold Mine; he offered Lock Campbell, a Texan man, expenses of $10,000 if he would undertake an expedition to find it. On 19 July 1899, Campbell and four other men signed an agreement to search for it, and one of the men later claimed to have discovered it in the Ladrones Mountains in New Mexico, but this was never verified.

== Personal life ==
On 18 July 1902 he married Violet Kate Henley, the daughter of Joseph Arthur Henley; they leased a town house at 28/31 Grosvenor Square, Mayfair and maintained a country residence in Hare Park outside London.

He died in the sinking of the RMS Lusitania on 7 May 1915, but his body was never identified.

== Sports interests ==
Cloete was also a famous owner and breeder of race horses, with his colt Paradox securing a number of major wins, including the Grand Prix de Paris, and claiming second place in the 1885 Epsom Derby. He played cricket for Crystal Palace CC, the Surrey Club and the Marylebone Cricket Club from 1877 to 1893. He also played football for the original Crystal Palace FC between 1870 and 1875.

== Bibliography ==
- Braddy, Haldeen (1945). "A Legend of the Lost Nigger Gold Mine". California Folklore Quarterly. 4 (4). Western States Folklore Society: 359–363. doi:10.2307/1495620. ISSN 1556-1283. JSTOR 1495620.
- Dobie, James Frank (1978). Coronado's Children: Tales of Lost Mines and Buried Treasures of the Southwest. University of Texas Press. ISBN 0-292-71052-6.
- Hart, John Mason (2006). Empire And Revolution: The Americans in Mexico Since the Civil War. University of California Press. ISBN 0520939298.
