= Richard Marsh (horseman) =

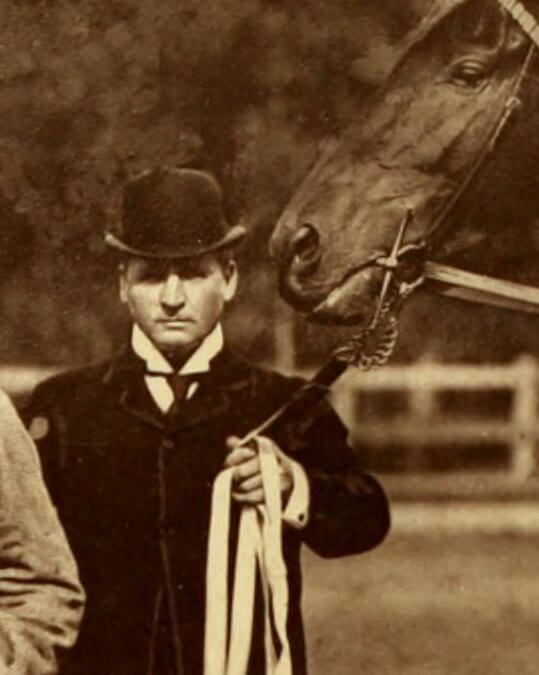
- Marsh with Persimmon in 1897

Personal information
- Born: 31 December 1851 Kent, United Kingdom
- Died: May 1933 (aged 81)
- Occupation: Trainer

Horse racing career
- Sport: Horse racing

Major racing wins
- British Classic Race wins as trainer: 2000 Guineas (3); 1000 Guineas (2); Epsom Derby (4); Epsom Oaks (1); St Leger (3)

Racing awards
- British flat racing Champion Trainer (1897), (1898), (1900)

Honours
- Member of the Royal Victorian Order

Significant horses
- Miss Jummy, La Fleche, Persimmon, Thais, Jeddah, Diamond Jubilee, Minoru

Richard Marsh MVO (1851–1933) was a British trainer of racehorses. After his promising career as a jockey was ended by his rising weight, Marsh set up as a trainer in 1874. He trained from a number of stables before eventually making his base at Egerton House in Newmarket, Suffolk. In a training career of fifty years, Marsh trained the winners of twelve British Classic Race and many other major races. His greatest success sprang from his association with King Edward VII, for whom he trained three winners of The Derby. Two of Marsh's sons later became successful trainers.

== Background ==
Richard Marsh was born on 31 December 1851, either in Dover or in the village of Smeeth in Kent. His father was a farmer and the family had no links to racing.

== Riding career ==
Marsh began riding racehorses in his mid teens and rode his first winner in 1866. He attracted the attention of some Newmarket trainers and rode his most important winner on Temple in the New Stakes at Royal Ascot in 1869. Marsh's rising weight forced him to abandon his career as a flat race jockey, although he had some success as a jockey in hurdle races and steeplechases until retiring from the saddle in 1881.

== Training career ==
In 1874 or 1875, Marsh began training horses at Banstead Manor at Epsom. He later moved to the Newmarket area, where he was based at Six Mile Bottom before moving to Lordship Farm. He attracted the patronage of several major owners including the Duke of Hamilton. In 1883, he recorded his first classic win when the Duke's horse Ossian won the St Leger. Three years later, he won the 1000 Guineas and Oaks for the same owner with Miss Jummy.

The horses owned by the Prince of Wales had been trained by John Porter at Lambourn, but in late 1892 they were sent to Marsh, who had just opened a large and well-equipped new stable at Egerton House in Newmarket. The official explanation was that Newmarket was closer to the royal residence at Sandringham, although there had also been a disagreement between the Prince's racing manager Marcus Beresford and one of Porter's principal patrons the Duke of Westminster. One owner who followed the Prince'e example was Maurice de Hirsch, who transferred the outstanding racemare La Fleche from Porter to Marsh. La Fleche took some time to adapt, but won the Ascot Gold Cup for Marsh in 1894.

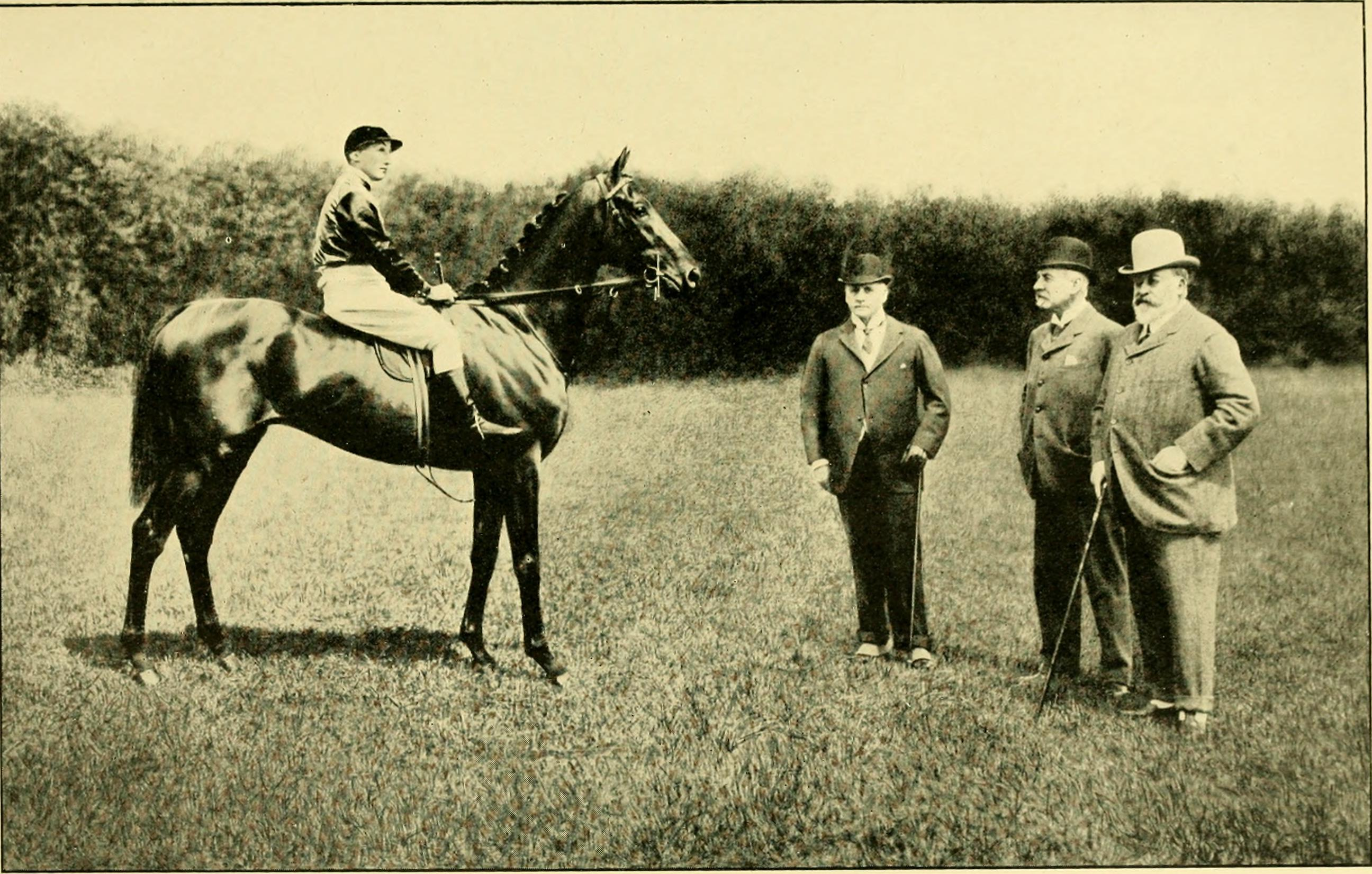
From left to right, Herbert Jones riding Minoru, Marsh, Lord Beresford and King Edward VII.

Marsh's first major success for his royal patron came with Persimmon. The colt won seven of his nine races including the Derby, St Leger, Eclipse Stakes and Ascot Gold Cup. Persimmon's successes led Queen Victoria to pay her final visit to Royal Ascot after Marsh assured her (correctly) that the horse was sure to win. Four years later, Marsh trained Persimmon's temperamental brother Diamond Jubilee to win the Triple Crown. Diamond Jubilee's wins enabled Marsh to win his third and final trainers' championship. The Prince continued his involvement in racing after coming to the throne as King Edward VII in 1901, although the numbers of his horses in training declined. Marsh gave the King his final major successes by sending out Minoru to win the 2000 Guineas and Derby in 1909.

Wins for other owners in the same period included the 1898 Derby with the 100/1 outsider Jeddah and the 1000 Guineas in 1896 with the filly Thais.

Royal interest in horse racing declined after Edward VII was succeeded by George V in 1910 and Marsh trained no further classic winners. He continued to be successful at a lower level, winning races including the Middle Park Stakes and the Royal Hunt Cup before retiring at the end of 1924. Marsh lived at Great Shelford near Cambridge until his death in May 1933 at the age of 82.

== Personal life ==
Marsh was a financially successful trainer, but ploughed most of his money into maintaining and improving the facilities at Egerton House. At one stage he was made bankrupt and on his death he left an estate of only £383. Away from the racecourse his main interest was drag hunting. Shortly after his retirement he published his autobiography entitled A Trainer to Two Kings.

Richard John Marsh married twice, his first wife Olive Thirlwell (m 1876) was the eldest daughter of a Sussex farmer (and racing enthusiast) Robert Thirlwell and older sister of Dan Thirlwell a well respected jockey of the 1880s. Richard had two sons who became successful trainers, Charles Marsh, from his first marriage, was the private trainer to William Brodrick Cloete and won the Oaks with Cherimoya on the filly's only racecourse appearance. Marsh's second marriage was to Grace (m 1900), the sister of Fred Darling. Their son Marcus Marsh trained five classic winners including Windsor Lad and Tulyar.
