= John Watts (jockey) =

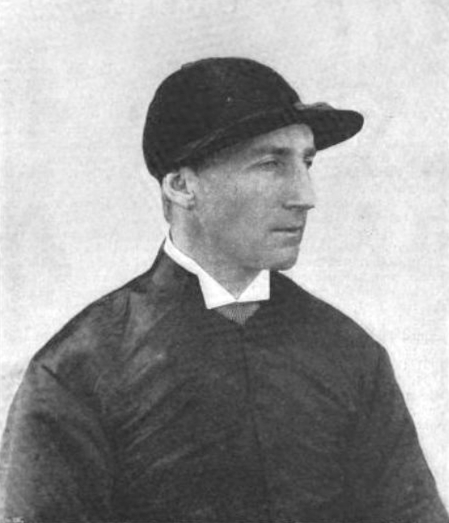
- In The Sketch, 3 June 1896

Personal information
- Born: 1861 Stockbridge, England, United Kingdom
- Died: 29 July 1902 (aged 41) Esher, England, United Kingdom
- Occupation: Jockey

Horse racing career
- Sport: Horse racing

Major racing wins
- British Classic Race wins: 2,000 Guineas (2); 1,000 Guineas (4); Epsom Oaks (4); Epsom Derby (5); St. Leger Stakes (5)

Significant horses
- Persimmon, Merry Hampton, Ladas; Sainfoin

John Watts (1861–1902) was a British flat-race jockey. In a career that lasted from 1880 until 1900 he rode the winners of 19 Classics. He was noted for his quiet and unspectacular style and undemonstrative personality. On his retirement from riding he became a trainer, but died two years later.

== Apprenticeship ==
Jack Watts was born at Stockbridge, Hampshire in 1861. In his mid teens he was apprenticed to the trainer Tom Cannon at Danebury, and rode his first winner in 1876. In 1878 he moved to Newmarket and joined the successful stable of Richard Marsh. His association with Marsh would last throughout his career.

== Major successes ==
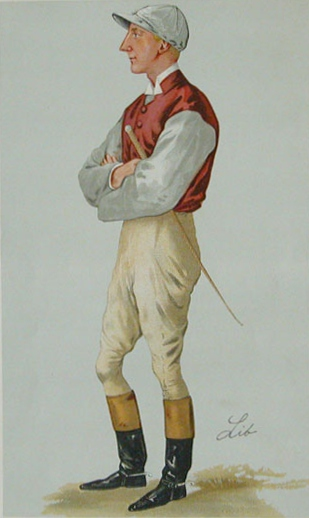
Watts caricatured in Vanity Fair, 1887

Marsh's patrons included the King Edward VII and the Duke of Hamilton, providing Watts with a string of top class rides. His major winners for the Duke included Ossian (St Leger) and Miss Jummy (1000 Guineas, Oaks), while the Prince provided him with probably his best horse, the Derby winner Persimmon. Watts was less fortunate with the Prince's second Derby winner, Diamond Jubilee, who loathed the jockey and tried to attack him before the Coventry Stakes at Royal Ascot. Watts subsequently gave up the ride on the temperamental colt.

Watts was also successful when riding for other owners and trainers including Mathew Dawson and John Porter for whom he rode the Derby winners Ladas and Sainfoin respectively.

== Retirement and death ==
By 1895 Watts was having serious weight problems and the constant "wasting" was affecting his health. He resolved to retire at the end of 1895, but was persuaded to reconsider by Marsh. Watts finally retired in 1900 and set himself up as a trainer at Newmarket, where his patrons included the King. He health was never good, however and he died on 29 July 1902 after falling ill at a race meeting at Sandown. He was forty-one years old. His funeral on 2 August was attended by "almost the entire town" of Newmarket.

== Family and descendants ==
Jack Watts was married twice and started a dynasty of trainers. His son John Evelyn Watts trained the 1927 Derby winner Call Boy, and his grandson John Frederick Watts became private trainer to Lord Derby and won the St Leger with Indiana in 1964. His son Harry was killed in action during the Great War, whilst his son Claude, a Leading Aircraftsman, by his second marriage was killed in a military accident in Suffolk in 1942. Jack Watts' great-grandson, John William "Bill" Watts trained Waterloo to win the 1000 Guineas in 1972 and Teleprompter to win the 1985 Arlington Million.
