= Macaroni (horse) =

British Thoroughbred racehorse

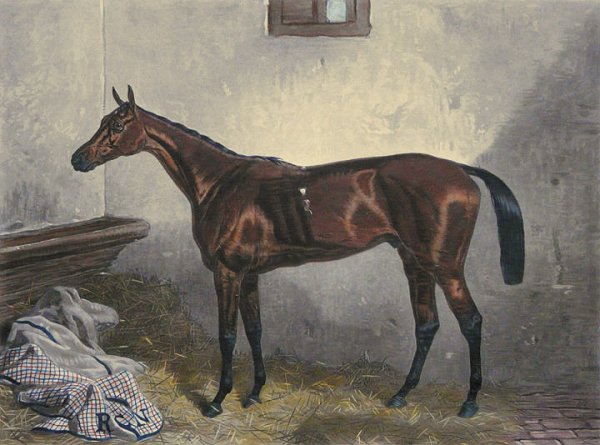
- Macaroni, painted by Harry Hall in 1863.
- Sire: Sweetmeat
- Grandsire: Gladiator
- Dam: Jocose
- Damsire: Pantaloon
- Sex: Stallion
- Foaled: 1860
- Died: 1887 (aged 26–27)
- Country: United Kingdom of Great Britain and Ireland
- Colour: Bay
- Breeder: Richard Grosvenor, 2nd Marquess of Westminster
- Owner: Richard Naylor
- Trainer: James Godding
- Record: 8: 7-1-0
- Earnings: £10,615

Major wins
- 2000 Guineas (1863); Epsom Derby (1863); Doncaster Cup (1863)

Macaroni (1860–1887) was a British Thoroughbred racehorse and sire. In a career that lasted from October 1862 to September 1863 he ran eight times and won seven races. In 1863 he won all seven of his races including the 2000 Guineas at Newmarket, The Derby and the Doncaster Cup.

== Background ==
Macaroni was bred by Richard Grosvenor, 2nd Marquess of Westminster at his Eaton stud in Cheshire. In 1861 Macaroni was one of several yearlings at the stud to be affected by an outbreak of an equine respiratory disease known as Strangles, which adversely affected his physical development and persuaded the Marquis to sell him. Macaroni was part of a lot of six yearlings bought for £700 by the Liverpool banker Richard Naylor, who had recently started his own stud at Hooton Park on the Wirral Peninsula.

Naylor sent the young horses to be trained by James "Jem" Godding at his Palace House stable at Newmarket, Suffolk. At the time, Newmarket was falling out of favour as a base for preparing horses for the Classics, and many leading owners and trainers had shifted their operations to centres in Berkshire and Sussex.

Macaroni's sire, Sweetmeat, a descendant of the Byerley Turk, was a very good racehorse, being unbeaten in sixteen races in 1845. In addition to Macaroni, he sired The Oaks winners Mincemeat and Mincepie as well as Parmesan who sired the Derby winners Favonius and Cremorne.

== Racing career ==
=== 1862: two-year-old season ===
In 1862, the best of Naylor's two-year-olds was reckoned to be a colt named Carnival, while Macaroni was very backward and slow to mature. He ran only once, in autumn at Newmarket and gave little grounds for optimism as he was beaten three-quarters of a length by Automaton, his only opponent in a two horse race. Naylor however, had a great belief in the colt and backed him heavily at long odds for the following year's Derby.

=== 1863: three-year-old season ===
Macaroni began his season at Newmarket in April when he won a one-mile stakes race by three lengths. Although the event was not particularly important, it proved that the colt went well on the course and coped with the unusually hard ground. Two weeks later over the same course and distance he started at odds of 10/1 against eight opponents for the 2000 Guineas, for which the favourite was the French colt Hospodar. Ridden by Tom Chaloner, he won by half a length from Saccharometer. The defeat of the French horse, who finished unplaced, and the popularity of Macaroni's owner, led to his win being warmly received by the Newmarket crowd.

On 20 May, Macaroni was a 10/1 chance for the Derby at Epsom, with Lord Clifden starting the 4/1 favourite in a field of thirty-one. The race was run in difficult conditions with heavy rain and soft ground. Among the spectators was the Prince of Wales, who became the first member of the British Royal Family to attend the race since Prince Albert in 1840. The start of the race was delayed for almost an hour, owing to a record thirty-two false starts caused by horses breaking away or failing to line up correctly. The huge field led to good deal of bumping and roughness, with three horses either falling or being brought down. Chaloner held up Macaroni in the early stages, before moving into fifth place entering the straight. A furlong from the finish, Lord Clifden went into a clear lead and looked the likely winner, but Macaroni produced a strong late run to catch the favourite in the last strides and win by a head. Rapid Rhone finished well to take third place. Macaroni's victory was warmly received in Newmarket, where the church bells were rung in celebration. Naylor marked his success by donating £1,000 to charities in his native city of Liverpool.

In July, Macaroni ran the Drawing Room Stakes at Goodwood. He was made odds-on favourite despite a ten pound weight penalty and won easily from two opponents. At York in August, he took on older horses in the two-mile York Cup and won by four lengths from Clarissimus.

At Doncaster in September, Macaroni bypassed the St Leger and ran instead in the 2 1/2-mile Doncaster Cup. He took the lead entering the straight and held off the sustained challenge of The Oaks winner Queen Bertha to win by one and a half lengths. At Newmarket in October he walked over in the Select Stakes and was then retired to stud.

== Stud career ==
Macaroni was retired to his owner's stud at Hooton until 1866 when was sold for 7,100 guineas to Baron Meyer de Rothschild who moved the stallion to his stud at Mentmore. Macaroni sired several successful racehorses, including the 2000 Guineas winner Macgregor but was more notable as a sire of broodmares. He was the damsire of the Triple Crown winner Ormonde and the important stallions Bona Vista, the male-line ancestor of most modern thoroughbreds, and Kendal (sire of the Triple Crown winner Galtee More). Macaroni died on 12 December 1887 and was buried at Mentmore.

== Sire line tree ==
- Macaroni
  - MacGregor
    - Craig Royston
      - Royston Crow
    - Scot Free
  - Macaroon
    - MacDuff
      - MacBeth

== Pedigree ==
Pedigree of Macaroni (GB), bay stallion, 1860
Sire Sweetmeat (GB) 1842	Gladiator; 1833	Partisan	Walton
Sire Sweetmeat (GB) 1842	Gladiator; 1833	Partisan	Parasol
Sire Sweetmeat (GB) 1842	Gladiator; 1833	Pauline	Moses
Sire Sweetmeat (GB) 1842	Gladiator; 1833	Pauline	Quadrille
Sire Sweetmeat (GB) 1842	Lollypop; 1836	Voltaire	Blacklock*
Sire Sweetmeat (GB) 1842	Lollypop; 1836	Voltaire	Phantom mare
Sire Sweetmeat (GB) 1842	Lollypop; 1836	Belinda	Blacklock*
Sire Sweetmeat (GB) 1842	Lollypop; 1836	Belinda	Wagtail
Dam Jocose (GB) 1843	Pantaloon; 1824	Castrel	Buzzard
Dam Jocose (GB) 1843	Pantaloon; 1824	Castrel	Alexander mare
Dam Jocose (GB) 1843	Pantaloon; 1824	Idalia	Peruvian
Dam Jocose (GB) 1843	Pantaloon; 1824	Idalia	Musidora
Dam Jocose (GB) 1843	Banter; 1826	Master Henry	Orville
Dam Jocose (GB) 1843	Banter; 1826	Master Henry	Miss Sophia
Dam Jocose (GB) 1843	Banter; 1826	Boadicea	Alexander
Dam Jocose (GB) 1843	Banter; 1826	Boadicea	Brunette (Family: 14-a)

* Macaroni is inbred 4S x 4S to the stallion Blacklock, meaning that he appears fourth generation twice on the sire side of his pedigree.
