= Gladiator (horse) =

British Thoroughbred racehorse

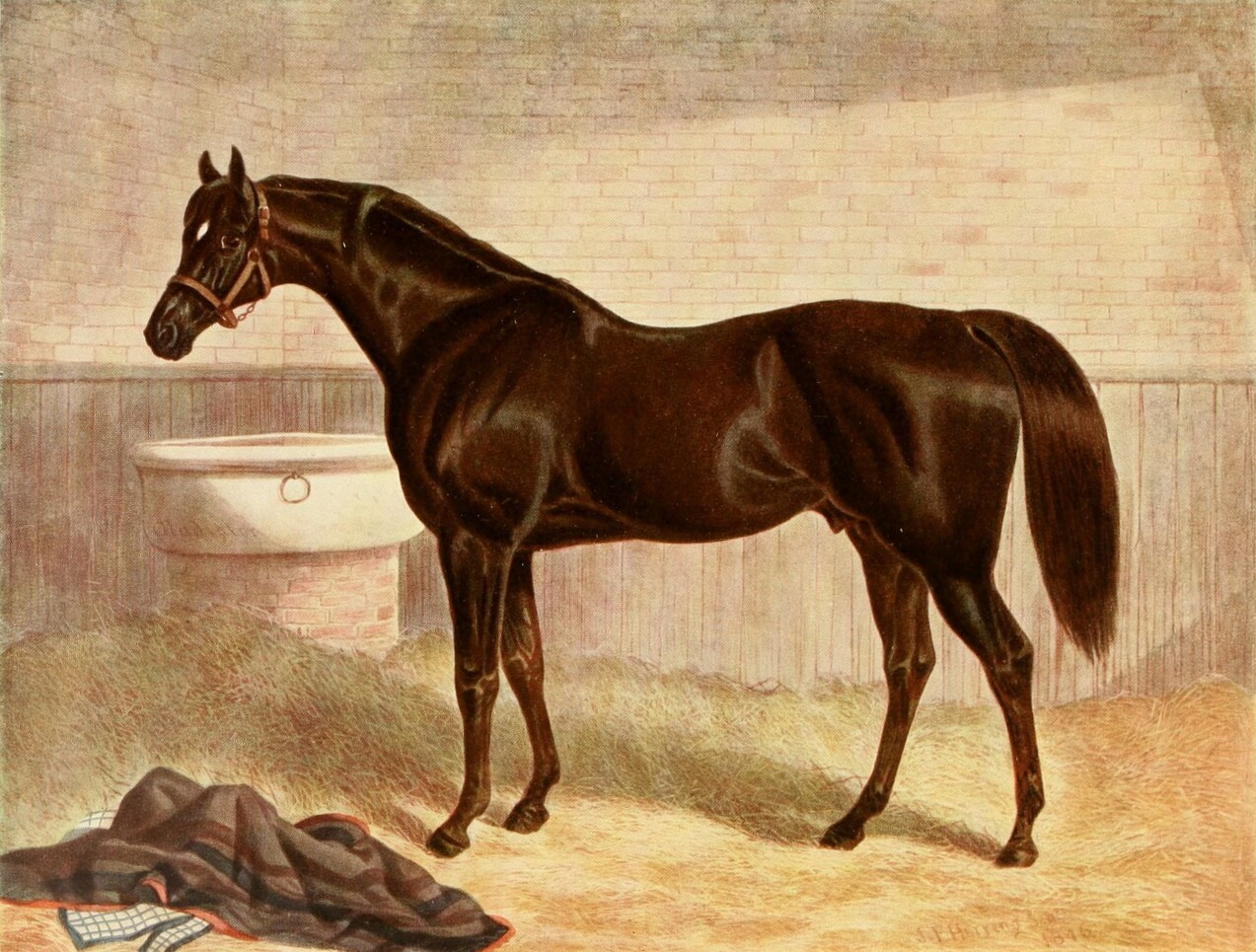
- engraved after John Frederick Herring, Sr.
- Sire: Partisan
- Grandsire: Walton
- Dam: Pauline
- Damsire: Moses
- Sex: Stallion
- Foaled: 1833
- Country: Great Britain
- Colour: Chestnut
- Record: 1: 0-1-0

Gladiator (1833 - 1857) was a British Thoroughbred racehorse and sire. He was not successful as a racehorse, but was successful as a sire, particularly in France. His export from Great Britain to France helped sustain the Herod sire line there, as it declined in Great Britain.

== Background ==
Gladiator was a bred by George Walker and foaled in 1833. He was out of a mare owned by Walker named Pauline, and was sired by the stallion Partisan. Gladiator was then sold to his trainer jockey team, John and William Scott when he was a year old, and was then resold to Thomas Edgerton. In 1846, he was purchased by the French government.

== Racing career ==
In his only start, he finished second place in a field of nineteen horses in the 1836 Epson Derby. As he was preparing for his next start in the St Leger Stakes, he came up lame, and was retired to stud.

== Stud career ==
England

Gladiator was moderately successful as a sire in England. Notable progeny include:

- Prizefighter (b. 1840): winner of the 1843 Great Yorkshire Stakes
- Joan of Arc (b. 1841): dead heat win in the 1843 Bretby Stakes
- Miss Sarah: winner of the 1845 Great Yorkshire Stakes and 1845 Park Hill Stakes
- Sweetmeat (b. 1842): winner of the 1844 Stanley Stakes, and Somersetshire Stakes, 1845 Queen's Vase and Doncaster Cup
- Queen Mary (b. 1843): one of the most influential broodmares of the 19th Century
- Dacia (b. 1845): winner of the 1848 Cambridgeshire Handicap Stakes

France

Gladiator was one of the most influential sires of the nineteenth century in France. Notable progeny include:

- Fitz Gladiator (b. 1850): winner of the 1853 Derby Continental de Gand, Grand St Leger de Moulins, and the Prix du Ministere; influential sire
- Celebrity (b. 1851): winner of the 1854 Prix du Jockey Club
- Coustrainville (b. 1851): winner of the 1854 Grand St Leger de Moulins
- Honesty (b. 1851: winner of the 1854 French Oaks
- Mademoiselle de Chantilly (b. 1854): winner of the 1856 Prix de l'Empereur, 1857 French Oaks, 1858 Suburban Handicap at Epson
- Miss Gladiator (b. 1854): dam of 1865 English Triple Crown winner Gladiateur
- Ventre St Gris (b. 1855): winner of the Prix du Jockey Club
- Union Jack (b. 1856): winner of the 1858 Prix de la Forêt and 1859 Prix Lupin
- Capucine (b. 1857): winner of the 1860 Grosser Preis Von Baden
- Surprise (b. 1857): winner of the 1860 French Oaks
- Brocoli (b. 1858): winner of the 1861 Poule d'Essai des Poulins

== Sire line tree ==
- Gladiator
  - Maccabeus
  - Napier
  - Prizefighter
  - Sweetmeat
    - Muscovado
      - Lantern
    - Comquot
    - Plumb Pudding
      - Grand National
    - Parmasan
      - Favonius
        - Favo
        - Sir Bevys
        - Eusebe
      - Cremorne
        - Thurio
        - Voluptuary
        - St George
      - Stracchino
    - Spicebox
    - Sweetsauce
    - Carnival
    - Macaroni
      - MacGregor
        - Craig Royston
        - Scot Free
      - Macaroon
        - MacDuff
    - Saccharometer
      - Shifnal
    - Lozenge
  - Fitz Gladiator
    - Compiegne
      - Mortemer
        - Chamant
        - Pagnotte
        - St Christophe
        - Verneuil
        - Apremont
        - Royaumont
        - Regain
        - Cholula
        - Exile
        - Cyclops
        - Savanac
        - Winfred
        - Montegue
        - Monticello
        - Pagan
        - Sleipner
        - St Hubert
        - Nick
    - Orphelin
      - Revigny
    - Gontran
    - Vertugadin
      - Saxifrage
        - Monarque
        - Tenebreuse
    - Nicolet
    - Maubourget
  - Coustrainville
  - Brocoli
  - Ventre St Gris
    - Peut Etre
      - Poulet
    - Ventriloque
  - Union Jack

== Pedigree ==
Pedigree of Gladiator, chestnut stallion, 1833
Sire Partisan 1811	Walton; 1799	Sir Peter Teazle; 1784	Highflyer*
Sire Partisan 1811	Walton; 1799	Sir Peter Teazle; 1784	Papillon
Sire Partisan 1811	Walton; 1799	Arethusa; 1792	Dungannon
Sire Partisan 1811	Walton; 1799	Arethusa; 1792	Prophet mare
Sire Partisan 1811	Parasol; 1800	Potoooooooo; 1773	Eclipse
Sire Partisan 1811	Parasol; 1800	Potoooooooo; 1773	Sportsmistress
Sire Partisan 1811	Parasol; 1800	Prunella; 1788	Highflyer*
Sire Partisan 1811	Parasol; 1800	Prunella; 1788	Promise
Dam Pauline 1826	Moses; 1819	Seymour; 1807	Delpini
Dam Pauline 1826	Moses; 1819	Seymour; 1807	Bay Javelin
Dam Pauline 1826	Moses; 1819	Gohanna mare 1807	Gohanna
Dam Pauline 1826	Moses; 1819	Gohanna mare 1807	Grey Skim
Dam Pauline 1826	Quadrille; 1815	Selim; 1802	Buzzard
Dam Pauline 1826	Quadrille; 1815	Selim; 1802	Alexander mare
Dam Pauline 1826	Quadrille; 1815	Canary Bird; 1806	Sorcerer
Dam Pauline 1826	Quadrille; 1815	Canary Bird; 1806	Canary

* Gladiator is inbred 4S x 4S to the stallion Highflyer, meaning that he appears fourth generation twice on the sire side of his pedigree.
