= Kennymore =

British Thoroughbred racehorse

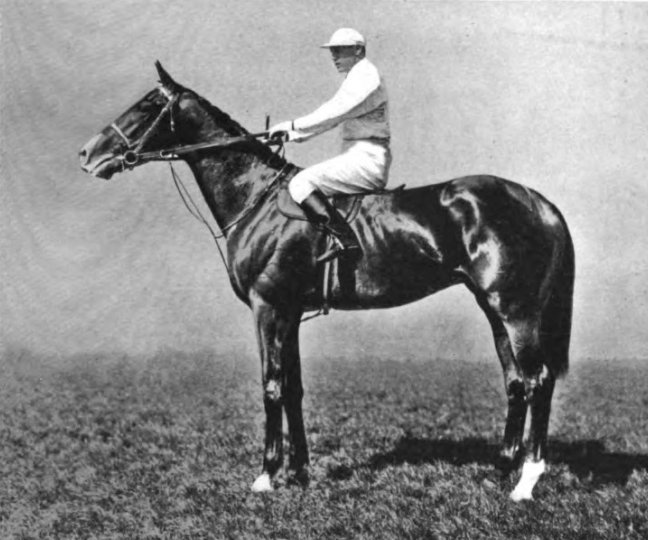
- Kennymore in 1914
- Sire: John o' Gaunt
- Grandsire: Isinglass
- Dam: Croceum
- Damsire: Martagon
- Sex: Stallion
- Foaled: February 1911
- Country: United Kingdom
- Colour: Bay
- Breeder: Sir John Thursby, 2nd Baronet
- Owner: John Thursby
- Trainer: Alec Taylor Jr.
- Record: 8: 4-1-2

Major wins
- Dewhurst Stakes (1913); Craven Stakes (1914); 2000 Guineas (1914); Newmarket St Leger (1914)

Kennymore (February 1911 – 1916) was a British Thoroughbred racehorse and sire. He was a highly talented horse whose career was adversely affected by his difficult temperament. He did not appear until the autumn of his two-year-old season but made an immediate impact as he finished third in the Middle Park Stakes and then won the Dewhurst Stakes. In the following spring he won the Craven Stakes and the 2000 Guineas but lost his chance in the Epsom Derby when he became highly agitated before the start. He went on to finish third in the Eclipse Stakes and second in the St Leger before winning the Newmarket St Leger on his final appearance. He died at the age of five in 1916 after a single season at stud.

== Background ==
Kennymore was a bay horse bred in England by his owner Sir John Thursby, 2nd Baronet. The colt was trained by Alec Taylor Jr. at Manton in Wiltshire. He was a difficult horse to manage and was described as having a "vile temper".

He was sired by Thursby's stallion John o'Gaunt who finished second in both the 2000 Guineas and Epsom Derby in 1904. The best of his other progeny was probably Swynford. Kennymore's dam was a granddaughter of Brown Bess, who was a half-sister to the 2000 Guineas winner Scot Free.

== Racing career ==
=== 1913: two-year-old season ===
On 17 October, on his racecourse debut, Kennymore finished third behind Cocyra and Stornoway in the Middle Park Stakes over six furlongs at Newmarket Racecourse. Ridden by Albert Whalley in the Dewhurst Plate over seven furlongs at the same track two weeks later he started at odds of 4/1 and won "comfortably" from Corcyra and Carrickfergus. After the race the colt was described as "a fairly formidable opponent for classic honours", although The Tetrarch (unbeaten in seven races) was regarded as by far the best British juvenile of the year.

=== 1914: three-year-old season ===
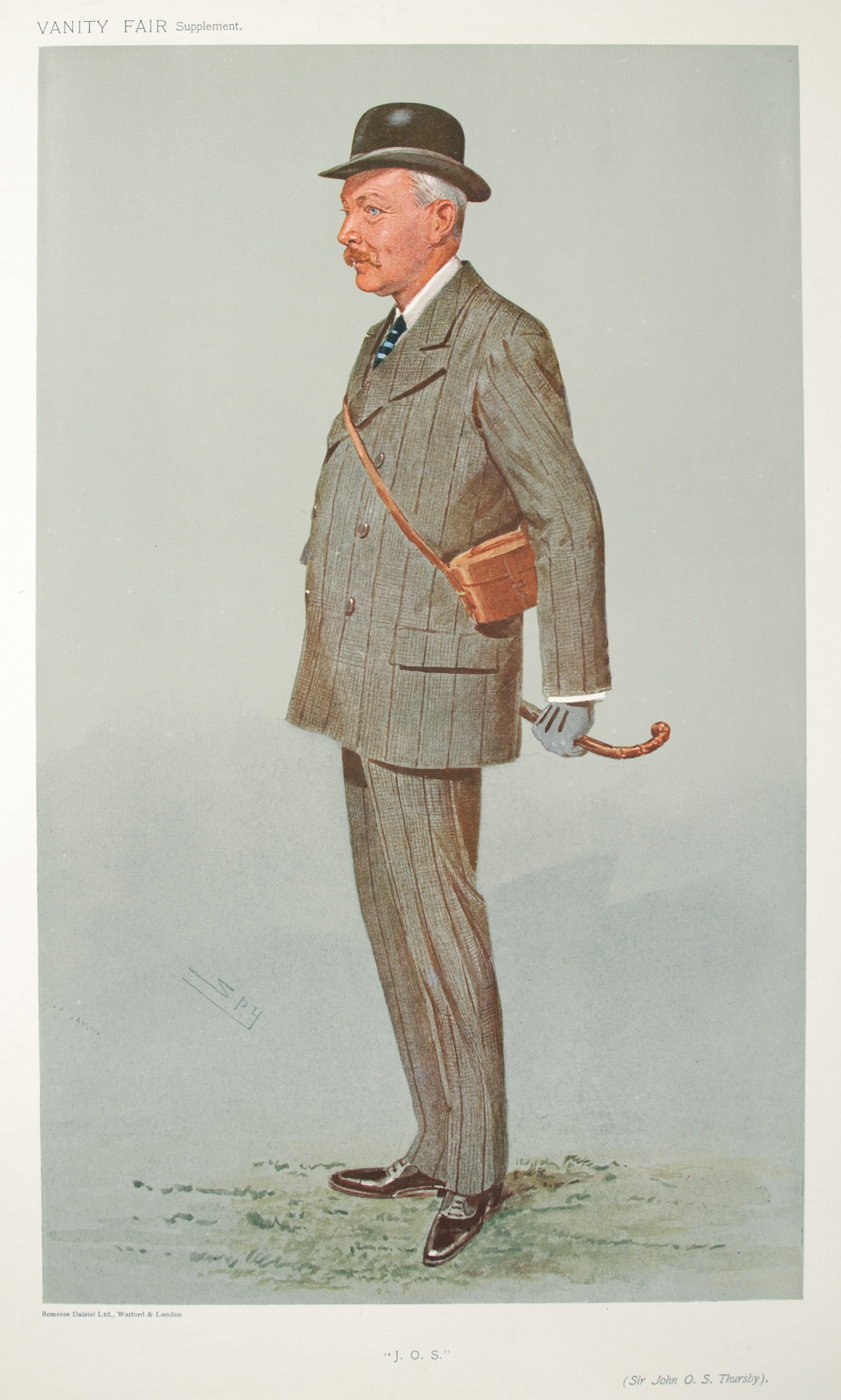
Sir John Thusby, who owned and bred Kennymore

Kennymore's classic prospects improved in early spring of when it became clear that The Tetrarch was having serious physical problems and was unlikely to stand further training. The colt began his second season in the Craven Stakes over the Rowley Mile in April in which he was ridden by Frank O'Neill and won at odds of 1/2. It was noted however that he had been troublesome and difficult to control before the start. On 29 April, in the presence of King George V, the colt was partnered by the French jockey Georges Stern when he contested the 106th running of the 2000 Guineas over the same course and distance. With The Tetrach absent as predicted, he stated the 2/1 favourite against seventeen opponents. Kennymore led from the start and held off a challenge from Corcyra to win the race by a short head, with two lengths back to Black Jester in third. After the race the colt was promoted to favouritism for the Epsom Derby and his position was consolidated when The Tetrarch was withdrawn from the race in mid-May.

On 27 May Kennymore started 9/4 favourite for the Derby over 1 1/2 miles at Epsom Racecourse. The start of the race was delayed for more than twenty minutes as the starter struggled to control the thirty-one runners leading Kennymore to become increasingly fractious, lashing out with his hooves and attempting to attack other horses. According to some reports however, the trouble was started when the colt was kicked by another horse, his distress being exacerbated by the rowdy behaviour of the "utterly inconsiderate" crowd. He was facing in the wrong direction and left a long way behind the other horses when the race began and after rushing up into sixth place approaching the straight he faded to finish twelfth behind the French outsider Durbar.

On 17 July Kennymore returned to the track for the Eclipse Stakes over ten furlongs at Sandown Park. As at Epsom, he misbehaved and delayed the start by his "furious antics" and refusal to line up alongside the other horses: it was only with some difficulty that his jockey, Jimmy Clark, persuaded him to race when the starting barrier went up. Although the race was open to older horses the finish was dominated by three-year-old colts, and Kennymore finished third behind Hapsburg (second in the Derby) and Honeywood. Clark commented "he seemed disinclined to race...he disappointed me" but added that the colt would be better suited by "a long, galloping course".

Alec Taylor decided to equip Kennymore with blinkers when the colt was moved up in distance to contest the St Leger Stakes over 14 1/2 furlongs at a Doncaster Racecourse on 10 September. He tood the lead from the start and set a "rasping" pace but tired in the straight and finished second, beaten five lengths by Black Jester. After the race Kennymoe's connections were reportedly critical of the forcing tactics employed by Kennymore's jockey Fred Templeman. On 2 October, Kennymore ended his season by winning the Newmarket St Leger over 1 3/4 miles against moderate opposition.

== Assessment and honours ==
In their book, A Century of Champions, based on the Timeform rating system, John Randall and Tony Morris rated Kennymore an "inferior" winner of the 2000 Guineas.

== Stud record ==
Kennymore was retired from racing to become a breeding stallion. He had little chance to prove himself, however, as he died in the late summer of 1916 after siring only one crop of foals.

== Pedigree ==
Pedigree of Kennymore (GB), bay stallion, 1911
Sire John o'Gaunt (GB) 1901	Isinglass; 1890	Isonomy	Sterling
Sire John o'Gaunt (GB) 1901	Isinglass; 1890	Isonomy	Isola Bella
Sire John o'Gaunt (GB) 1901	Isinglass; 1890	Dead Lock	Wenlock
Sire John o'Gaunt (GB) 1901	Isinglass; 1890	Dead Lock	Malpractice
Sire John o'Gaunt (GB) 1901	La Fleche; 1889	St Simon	Galopin
Sire John o'Gaunt (GB) 1901	La Fleche; 1889	St Simon	St Angela
Sire John o'Gaunt (GB) 1901	La Fleche; 1889	Quiver	Toxophilite*
Sire John o'Gaunt (GB) 1901	La Fleche; 1889	Quiver	Young Melbourne Mare
Dam Croceum (GB) 1898	Martagon; 1887	Bend Or	Doncaster
Dam Croceum (GB) 1898	Martagon; 1887	Bend Or	Rouge Rose
Dam Croceum (GB) 1898	Martagon; 1887	Tiger Lily	Macaroni*
Dam Croceum (GB) 1898	Martagon; 1887	Tiger Lily	Polly Agnes
Dam Croceum (GB) 1898	Hag; 1887	Hagioscope	Speculum
Dam Croceum (GB) 1898	Hag; 1887	Hagioscope	Sophia*
Dam Croceum (GB) 1898	Hag; 1887	Brown Bess	Musket*
Dam Croceum (GB) 1898	Hag; 1887	Brown Bess	Celibacy (Family: 1-a)

* Kennymore is inbred 4S x 5D to the stallion Toxophilite, meaning that he appears fourth generation on the sire side of his pedigree, and fifth generation (via Musket) on the dam side of his pedigree.

* Kennymore is inbred 4D x 5D to the stallion Macaroni, meaning that he appears fourth generation and fifth generation (via Sofia) on the dam side of his pedigree.
