= Hannah (horse) =

British-bred Thoroughbred racehorse

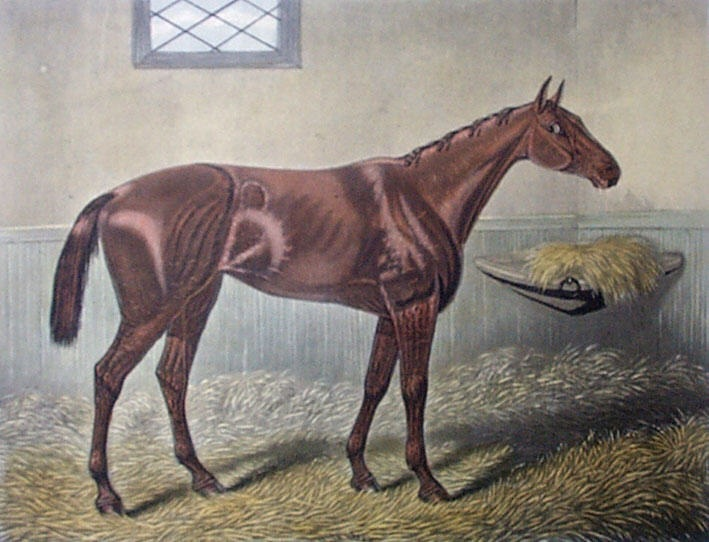
- Hannah
- Sire: King Tom
- Grandsire: Harkaway
- Dam: Mentmore Lass
- Damsire: Melbourne
- Sex: Mare
- Foaled: 1868
- Country: Great Britain
- Colour: Bay
- Breeder: Baron de Rothschild
- Owner: Baron de Rothschild
- Trainer: Joseph Hayhoe
- Record: 29: 11–4–7

Major wins
- July Stakes (1870); 1000 Guineas (1871); Epsom Oaks (1871); St. Leger Stakes (1871); Triennial Produce Stakes (1870, 1871, 1872)

Honours
- 2nd Fillies Triple Crown (1871)

Hannah (1868 – November 1875) was a British Thoroughbred racehorse and the second horse to win the English Fillies Triple Crown.

== Background ==
Hannah was bred by the Rothschild family and named for Baron Meyer Rothschild’s only daughter. She was sired by King Tom (champion sire and son of influential broodmare Pocahontas) and 1000 Guineas winner Mentmore Lass, who was one of the Rothchild’s foundation mares and also produced Zephyr, dam of Derby winner Favonius.

Hannah was a slender bay filly, light of bone, and was put into training with Joseph Hayhoe.

== Racing career ==
=== 1870: two-year-old season ===
Hannah was still unnamed (as was permitted for juveniles) when she made her debut in the July Stakes at Newmarket. She duly won by half a length from General (who later won the Criterion Stakes), before going on to win the Triennial Produce Stakes by two lengths and Clearwell Stakes by one and a half lengths.

The following day, Hannah finished third to Albert Victor and Steppe in the Middle Park Plate after trying to concede them 7 lbs in weight. She finished off her two-year-old campaign two days later in the Prendergast Stakes, where she finished second by a head to Digby Grand.

=== 1871: three-year-old season ===
Hannah reappeared in the following year’s 1000 Guineas, where she was sent off the 2/1 favourite and won easily by three lengths from Steppe. She next stepped up to a mile and a half for the Oaks, where she was again three lengths too good for her rivals.

Hannah then raced in the Prince of Wales's Stakes at Ascot, where she was third to the Derby second King Of The Forest and Ripponden as the 4/1 favourite after trying to concede 11 lbs.

She then attempted to emulate Formosa in winning the St Leger and the Fillies Triple Crown. Up against nine rivals, including Middle Park Plate conqueror Albert Victor (who also dead heated for second in the Derby), Hannah was sent off the 9/4 favourite and won by a length. By winning the St Leger, Hannah ensured that her owner, Baron de Rothschild had won all five Classic races (he had won the Derby with Favonius). 1868 became known as “the Baron’s Year”.

Hannah went on to win the Triennial Produce Stakes in a walkover, before finishing third to Verdure in the Newmarket Oaks in her final race of the season.

=== 1872: four-year-old season ===
Hannah won only twice the following season, by a head in two runner renewal of the two mile Ascot Triennial Stakes, and by three lengths in her third Triennial Produce Stakes at Newmarket. She was also third in the Ascot Gold Cup to Monarque and stablemate Favonius, and fifth in the Cambridgeshire to Playfair (receiving nearly 3 stone in weight).

=== 1873: five-year-old season ===
Hannah was well past the peak of her classic winning season by age five, and again only won twice in nine starts in two handicaps. She also finished fourth in the City and Suburban Handicap to Mornington, second in the Gold Vase to Thorn, and last of seven in the Ascot Gold Cup behind Cremorne. In her last appearance on a racecourse, Hannah was third to Flageolet in the Jockey Club Cup.

== Retirement ==
Hannah was retired to stud after her five-year-old season, where she produced the colt Holmby before miscarrying twins and dying in November 1875 at the age of seven.

== Assessment ==
Although she was the best filly of her generation, Hannah’s trainer Hayhoe rated her Derby winner stablemate Favonius 16 lbs superior to her. She was also considered by her connections to be of similar ability her stablemate Corisande, winner of the Coronation Stakes and Cesarewitch.
