= 1884 Grand National =

English steeplechase horse race

- Grand National
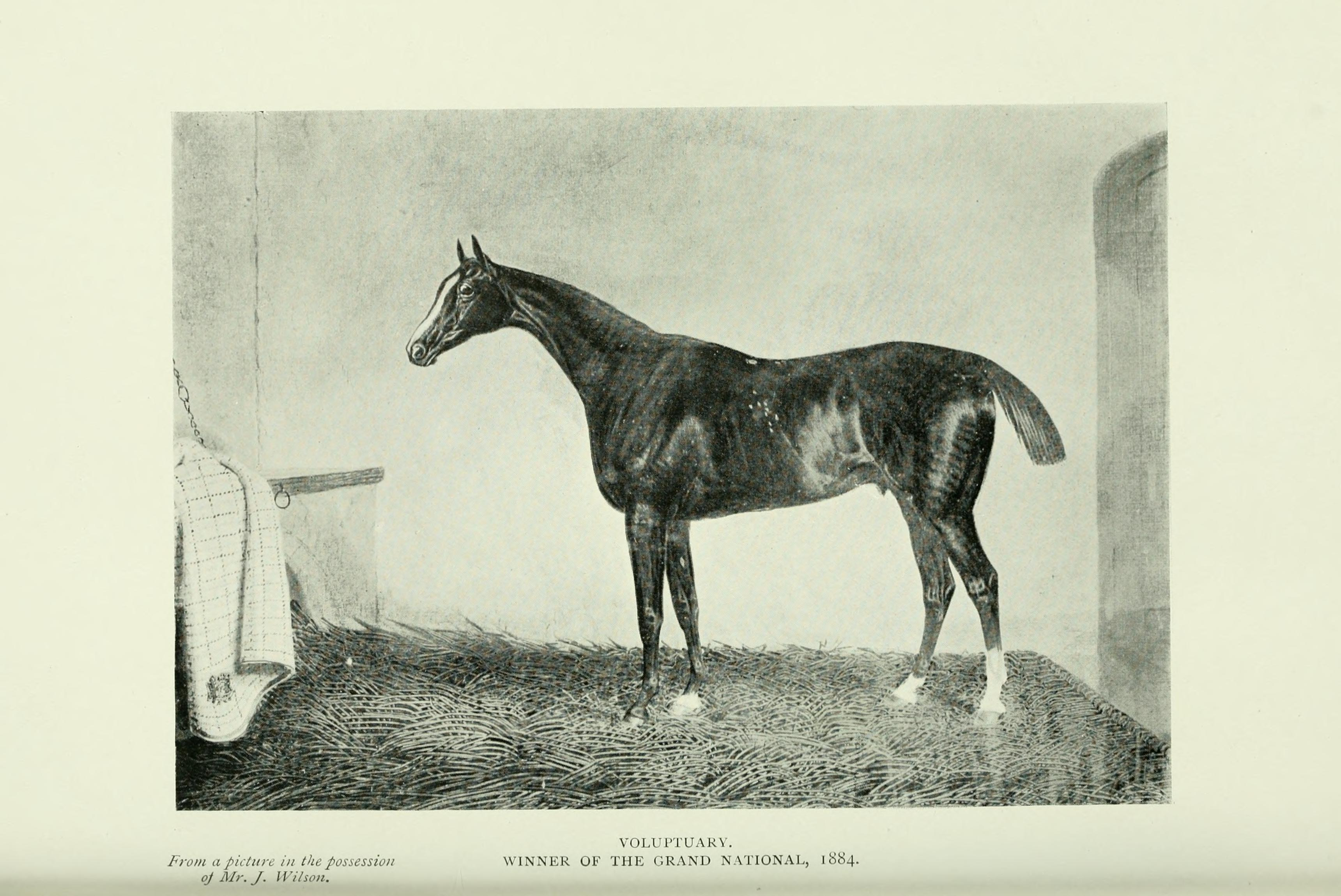
- Voluptuary (from Heroes and heroines of the Grand National)
- Location: Aintree
- Date: 28 March 1884
- Winning horse: Voluptuary
- Starting price: 10/1
- Jockey: Ted Wilson
- Trainer: William Wilson
- Owner: H. F. Boyd
- Conditions: Good

The 1884 Grand National was the 46th renewal of the Grand National horse race that took place at Aintree near Liverpool, England, on 28 March 1884.

== Finishing order ==
Note: In the 1880s the only official return was for the first, second, and third-placed horses. The lower finishing order listed is taken from the dedicated sports newspaper, Bell's Life, which published a more detailed account of the race than the syndicated report which appeared in most regional newspapers. However, the finishing positions from fourth must be regarded as unofficial.

Position	Name	Jockey	Handicap (st-lb)	SP	Distance
01	Voluptuary	Ted Wilson	10-5	10/1	4 Lengths
02	Frigate	Harry Beasley	11-3	10/1	6 Lengths
03	Roquefort	John Childs	10-5	9/1	4 Lengths
04	Cyrus	James Jewitt	11-12	9/1	A Distance
05	Zitella	Tommy Beasley	12-00	100/7	
06	Zoedone	Count Charles Kinsky	12-2	100/7	
07	Black Prince	Tom Widger	10-11	50/1	100 Yards
08	Cortolvin	Captain D Smith	10-00	100/12	A long way
09	Idea	Willie Moore	10/12	100-6	
10	Satellite	Johnny Beasley	10/05	8-1	
11	Albert Cecil	R Sherrife	11-02	50/1	
12	The Scot	John Jones	11-03	6/1 F	
13	Terrier	Dan Thirlwell	10-00	33/1	Last to finish

== Non-finishers ==
Fence	Name	Jockey	Handicap (st-lb)	SP	Fate
24	Regal	William Hunt	11-6	20/1	Pulled Up
25	Tom Jones	John Lee-Barber	10-4	25/1	Fell
