= Kendal (horse) =

British-bred Thoroughbred racehorse

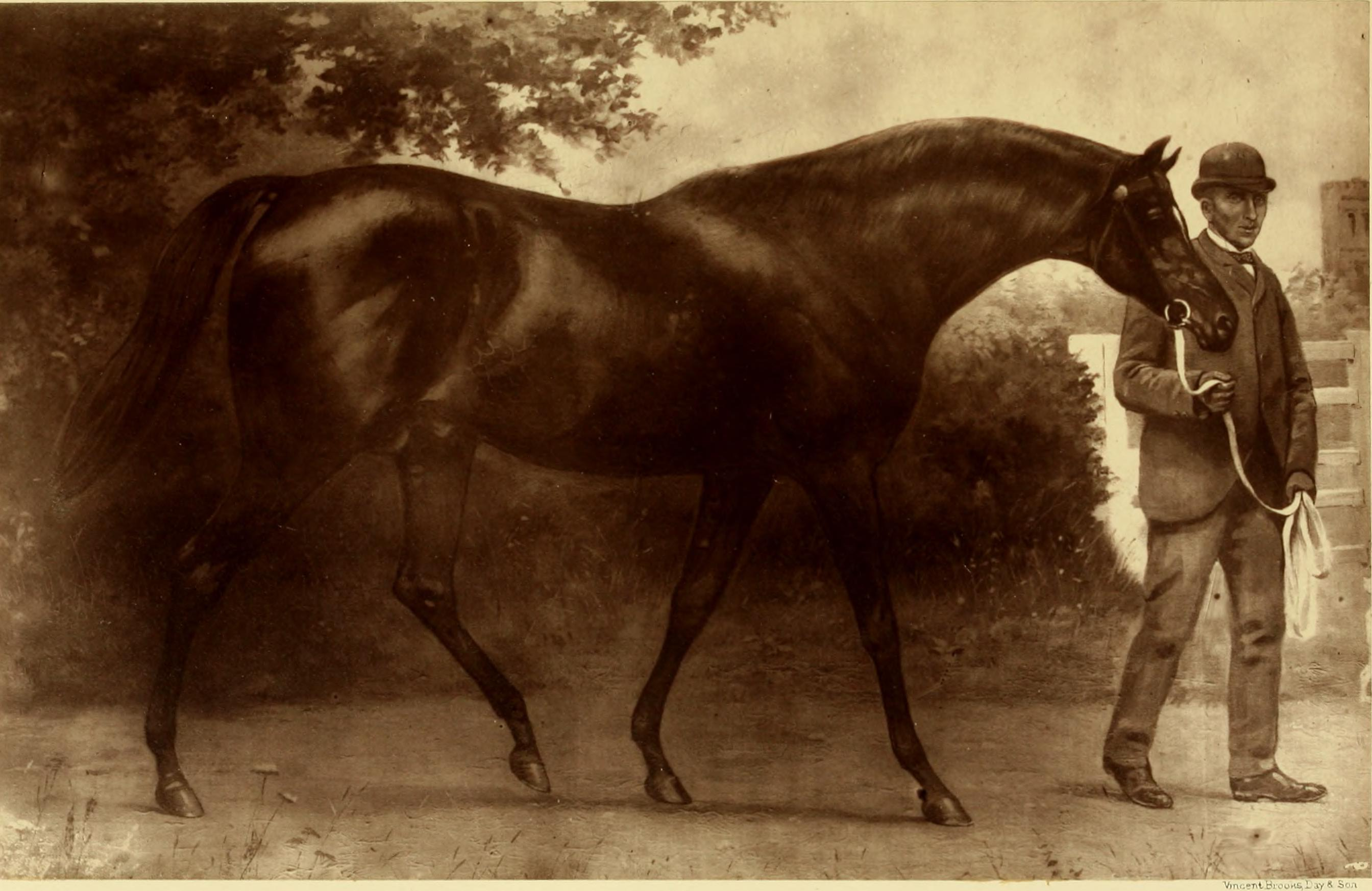
- Sire: Bend Or
- Grandsire: Doncaster
- Dam: Windermere
- Damsire: Macaroni
- Sex: Stallion
- Foaled: 1883
- Country: Great Britain
- Colour: Chestnut
- Breeder: 1st Duke of Westminster
- Owner: 1st Duke of Westminster
- Trainer: John Porter
- Record: 8: 6-1-0
- Earnings: £4,053

Major wins
- July Stakes (1885)

Awards
- Leading sire in Great Britain and Ireland (1897)
- Last updated on 5 August 2012

Kendal (1883–1908) was an English Thoroughbred racehorse. He was trained at Kingsclere by John Porter for the 1st Duke of Westminster. He was a leading two-year-old, but retired due to injury. He later became a successful stallion and was Champion sire in 1897.

== Race career ==
In his first race Kendal won the Mostyn Plate at Chester. He was then second to Saraband in the New Stakes at Ascot. Next he won the Stockbridge Post Sweepsteakes. He then won the July Stakes at Newmarket by ¾ length from Mephisto in a field that also included St. Mirin. Kendal next won the Ham Stakes at Goodwood. He also won the Great Breeders' Convivial Produce Stakes at the Ebor Meeting at York. He then won the Municipal Stakes in a walkover. In his last race he finished fourth in the Rous Memorial Stakes at Newmarket. Due to a leg injury sustained shortly after the Municipal Stakes he was retired to stud and never raced as a three-year-old.

== Stud career ==
Kendal became a successful stallion and was Champion sire in 1897. He most notable son was Galtee More, winner of the Middle Park Plate, 2000 Guineas, Epsom Derby, Prince of Wales's Stakes and St Leger Stakes. His stud fee for 1898 was 200 guineas, plus one guinea for the groom. Kendal died in 1908.

== Pedigree ==
Pedigree of Kendal, chestnut stallion, 1883
Sire Bend Or ch. 1877	Doncaster ch. 1870	Stockwell ch. 1849	The Baron
Sire Bend Or ch. 1877	Doncaster ch. 1870	Stockwell ch. 1849	Pocahontas
Sire Bend Or ch. 1877	Doncaster ch. 1870	Marigold ch. 1860	Teddington
Sire Bend Or ch. 1877	Doncaster ch. 1870	Marigold ch. 1860	Ratan mare
Sire Bend Or ch. 1877	Rouge Rose ch. 1865	Thormanby ch. 1857	Windhound
Sire Bend Or ch. 1877	Rouge Rose ch. 1865	Thormanby ch. 1857	Alice Hawthorn
Sire Bend Or ch. 1877	Rouge Rose ch. 1865	Ellen Horne br. 1844	Redshank
Sire Bend Or ch. 1877	Rouge Rose ch. 1865	Ellen Horne br. 1844	Delhi
Dam Windermere ch. 1870	Macaroni b. 1860	Sweetmeat br. 1842	Gladiator
Dam Windermere ch. 1870	Macaroni b. 1860	Sweetmeat br. 1842	Lollypop
Dam Windermere ch. 1870	Macaroni b. 1860	Jocose b. 1843	Pantaloon
Dam Windermere ch. 1870	Macaroni b. 1860	Jocose b. 1843	Banter
Dam Windermere ch. 1870	Miss Agnes br. 1850	Birdcatcher ch. 1833	Sir Hercules
Dam Windermere ch. 1870	Miss Agnes br. 1850	Birdcatcher ch. 1833	Guiccioli
Dam Windermere ch. 1870	Miss Agnes br. 1850	Agnes b./br. 1844	Clarion
Dam Windermere ch. 1870	Miss Agnes br. 1850	Agnes b./br. 1844	Annette

Note: b. = Bay, br. = Brown, ch. = Chestnut
