= Scot Free =

British Thoroughbred racehorse

- Sire: MacGregor
- Grandsire: Macaroni
- Dam: Celibacy
- Damsire: Lord Clifden
- Sex: Stallion (eventually gelded)
- Foaled: 1881
- Country: United Kingdom
- Colour: Brown
- Breeder: E Etches
- Owner: James Foy
- Trainer: Tom Chaloner
- Record: 12: 4-1-0

Major wins
- Sapling Plate (1883); Craven Stakes (1884); 2000 Guineas (1884)

Scot Free (1881 – after 1887) was a British Thoroughbred racehorse and sire. He showed promise as a two-year-old in 1883 when he won Sapling Plate. In the following spring he emerged as one of the best horses of his generation in England with emphatic victories in the Craven Stakes and the 2000 Guineas. He had never been entered in the Epsom Derby and finished unplaced when made favourite for the St Leger. He remained in training as a four-year-old in 1885 but became very difficult to manage and was eventually gelded.

== Background ==
Scot Free was a brown horse bred in England by E Etches. As a yearling he was offered for sale and bought for 250 guineas by James Foy, a professional gambler and bloodstock dealer. He was trained by Tom Chaloner at Newmarket, Suffolk. The colt was originally named Donald II.

He was probably the best horse sired by Macgregor, who won the 2000 Guineas and started odds on favourite for the Epsom Derby in 1870. Scot Free's dam Celibacy was a half-sister to Brown Bess, the female-line ancestor of Kennymore.

== Racing career ==
=== 1883: two-year-old season ===
In 1883 Scot Free made three racecourse appearances. He recorded his only victory of the year when he won the Sapling Plate at Sandown Park.

=== 1884: three-year-old season ===
Scot Free began his second season in the Craven Stakes over the Rowley Mile at Newmarket Racecourse and started the 6/1 second choice in the betting. Ridden by John Osborne he took the lead soon after the start and won "easily" by three lengths from the favourite Loch Ranza. Following the race the Duchess of Montrose attempted to buy the colt but was dissuaded by the asking price of 10,000 guineas. On 30 April Scot Free started the 3/1 favourite for the 76th running of the 2000 Guineas over the same course and distance. The veteran George Fordham was expected to partner the colt but as he was suffering from ill-health, the ride went to Bill Platt. On the eve of the race Fordham said that he was so weak that he might fall out of the saddle but asked that a bet of £5 should be placed on Scot Free on his behalf. The best fancied of his nine opponents were Royal Fern, Superba (Champagne Stakes) and St Medard. Harvester was the first horse to show in front but Scot Free took the lead before half-way. The favourite never looked in any danger of defeat thereafter and accelerated away from his rivals in the closing stages to win by five lengths from St Medard, with Harvester a head away in third. According to one account he "came bounding out of the Abingdon mile bottom [a furlong from the finish] like a cricket ball".

In the Payne Stakes over ten furlongs at Newmarket two weeks later Scot Free started the 8/15 favourite but was beaten a length by Harvester, to whom he was conceding seven pounds in weight. Scot Free had never been entered in the Derby Stakes and in his absence Harvester ran a dead heat for first place with St. Gatien.

At Doncaster Racecourse on 10 September, Scot Free was stepped up in distance for the St Leger over 14 1/2 furlongs. His preparation for the race had not been helped by the very dry conditions which led to unusually firm ground at Newmarket. Ridden by John Osborne he was made the 4/1 favourite but was never among the leaders and finished ninth behind The Lambkin.

Scot Free's winnings for the year came to £4,799.

=== 1885: four-year-old season ===
Scot Free remained in training as a four-year-old in 1885. During a training gallop early in the year, he threw his jockey and attacked another horse, losing several teeth in the ensuing fight. He began his third season in the £2,000 Leicestershire Spring Handicap over one mile at Leicester Racecourse on 11 April for which he was assigned a weight of 120 pounds. He started at odds of 12/1 and came home fifth of the eighteen runner behind the filly Whitelock. A week later at the Craven meeting at Newmarket he finished unplaced in two handicap races, the six-furlong Crawfurd Plate and the one-mile Babraham Plate. At Royal Ascot in June Scot Free started second favourite for the Gold Cup over 2 1/2 miles but finished last of the four runners behind St. Gatien, Eole and The Dutchman.

=== Later career ===
Scot Free was not raced in 1886 and was gelded sometime before the 1887 racing season. He won the Trial Plate at the Epsom Spring Meeting, beating The Tyke by a length and a half. He was sold immediately after the race for 650 guineas. Returned to J. Foy, he was last of seven runners in the Brighton High-Wright Plate in August 1887.

== Pedigree ==
Pedigree of Scot Free (GB), brown stallion, 1881
Sire MacGregor (GB) 1867	Macaroni; 1860	Sweetmeat	Gladiator
Sire MacGregor (GB) 1867	Macaroni; 1860	Sweetmeat	Lollypop
Sire MacGregor (GB) 1867	Macaroni; 1860	Jocose	Pantaloon
Sire MacGregor (GB) 1867	Macaroni; 1860	Jocose	Banter
Sire MacGregor (GB) 1867	Necklace; 1860	The Fallow Buck	Venison
Sire MacGregor (GB) 1867	Necklace; 1860	The Fallow Buck	Plenary
Sire MacGregor (GB) 1867	Necklace; 1860	Bracelet	Touchstone*
Sire MacGregor (GB) 1867	Necklace; 1860	Bracelet	Manacle
Dam Celibacy (GB) 1869	Lord Clifden; 1860	Newminster	Touchstone*
Dam Celibacy (GB) 1869	Lord Clifden; 1860	Newminster	Beeswing
Dam Celibacy (GB) 1869	Lord Clifden; 1860	The Slave	Melbourne
Dam Celibacy (GB) 1869	Lord Clifden; 1860	The Slave	Volley
Dam Celibacy (GB) 1869	Cowl mare 1851	Cowl	Bay Middleton
Dam Celibacy (GB) 1869	Cowl mare 1851	Cowl	Crucifix
Dam Celibacy (GB) 1869	Cowl mare 1851	Lanercost mare	Lanercost
Dam Celibacy (GB) 1869	Cowl mare 1851	Lanercost mare	The Nun (Family 1-a)

* Scot Free is inbred 4S x 4D to the stallion Touchstone, meaning that he appears fourth generation on the sire side of his pedigree and fourth generation on the dam side of his pedigree.
