= Sweetmeat (horse) =

British-bred Thoroughbred racehorse

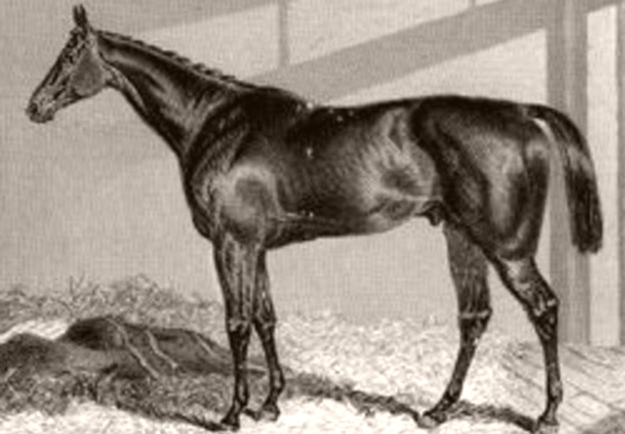
- Sire: Gladiator
- Grandsire: Partisan
- Dam: Lollypop
- Damsire: Starch or Voltaire
- Sex: Stallion
- Foaled: 1841
- Country: England
- Colour: Bay or brown
- Breeder: Major Yarburgh
- Owner: Mr A. W. Hill; James Cookson
- Record: 22: 19 -1-0

Major wins
- Doncaster Gold Cup (1845)
- Last updated on 11 July 2011

Sweetmeat (foaled 1841) was a successful English Thoroughbred racehorse that won 16 consecutive races (including walk-overs) as a three-year-old, including the Doncaster Gold Cup, and was a useful sire of the early 19th century.

== Background ==
He was a bay or brown colt foaled in 1841 that was sired by Gladiator, who became an important sire in France. Sweetmeat's dam, Lollypop was sired by either Starch or Voltaire, as recorded in the General Stud Book, with Voltaire listed in second position, which indicates he was the last stallion to cover the mare and therefore the most likely sire of Lollypop. If Lollypop was indeed by Voltaire she was incestuously inbred to Blacklock, who was the sire of both Voltaire and Belinda (the dam of Lollypop).

== Racing record ==
=== At two years ===
In July 1844 Sweetmeat won the Stanley Stakes at Liverpool. He then won a £220 sweep at Wolverhampton, and a 60 sovereign race at Wrexham, defeating three other horses. In the Two Year Old Stakes at Nottingham, he finished second.

=== At three years ===
Sweetmeat was undefeated in his 16 starts, including a number of walk-overs, as a three-year-old, which included victories in the Ascot Gold Vase and the 2¼ mile Doncaster Gold Cup defeating Alice Hawthorne who had twice previously won the race.

=== At four and five years ===
Sweetmeat only started once at four, in the Chester Cup in which he was unplaced. At five he started once again, at Chester in the Cheshire Stakes, and was again unplaced.

Sweetmeat finished his racing career with 22 race starts for 19 wins, 1 second and 2 unplaced runs.

== Stud record ==
In 1847 James Cookson purchased Sweetmeat for 300 guineas as a sire for his Neasham Hall Stud near Darlington. It was here that Cookson bred the great Formosa who won in 1868 the 1,000 Guineas Stakes, 2,000 Guineas Stakes, St. Leger Stakes, Epsom Oaks and Newmarket Oaks. Seven years earlier Cookson bred both Dundee and Kettledrum, who finished first and second in The Derby. Sweetmeat stood at this stud until 1861 when, aged 19 and blind, he was sold for 800 guineas and exported to Russia.

His progeny included:

- Macaroni, who won the 2000 Guineas, Epsom Derby and Doncaster Cup; sired three Epsom Oaks winners and the top-class broodmare Lily Agnes (dam of Ormonde and granddam of Sceptre).
- Mincemeat (a half sister to Kettledrum, both being out of Hybla) won the Epsom Oaks Stakes and was the dam of 1000 Guineas winner Tomato.
- Mincepie (1853) won Epsom Oaks Stakes
- Muscovado exported to Australia, sire of stakes-winners including Lantern (won the Melbourne Cup)
- Nettle (1852) won Gimcrack Stakes, third dam of the Triple Crown winner Common
- Parmesan sire of two Derby winners and a French Oaks winner plus others.
- Plum Pudding (1857), sired Grand National (won the 1876 Irish Grand National), Billy Pitt (won Irish Derby) and Silk (dam of Master Kildare, undefeated juvenile in Ireland).
- Saccharometer (1860) won King's Stand Stakes
- Sweetsauce (1857) won Goodwood Cup

== Sire line tree ==
- Sweetmeat
  - Muscovado
    - Lantern
    - The Sign
  - Comquot
  - Plumb Pudding
    - Billy Pitt
    - Grand National
  - Parmasan
    - Favonius
      - Favo
        - Primrose League
      - Sir Bevys
        - Aladdin
        - Banter
        - Bevil
        - The Vicar
        - Mountain Knight
        - Country Boy
        - Beaver
        - Theodore
        - The Rector
        - Morglay
        - Chilton Boy
      - Eusebe
        - Le Torpilleur
    - Cremorne
      - Thurio
      - Voluptuary
      - St George
        - Woodson
          - Red Bud
    - Stracchino
      - Cleodore
      - Germain
  - Spicebox
  - Sweetsauce
  - Carnival
  - Macaroni
    - MacGregor
      - Craig Royston
        - Royston Crow
      - Scot Free
    - Macaroon
      - MacDuff
        - MacBeth
  - Saccharometer
    - Shifnal
    - Vanderdecken
  - Lozenge

== Pedigree ==
Pedigree of Sweetmeat, brown stallion, 1842
Sire Gladiator (GB) br. 1833	Partisan (GB) b. 1811	Walton b. 1799	Sir Peter Teazle
Sire Gladiator (GB) br. 1833	Partisan (GB) b. 1811	Walton b. 1799	Arethusa
Sire Gladiator (GB) br. 1833	Partisan (GB) b. 1811	Parasol; 1800	Pot-8-Os
Sire Gladiator (GB) br. 1833	Partisan (GB) b. 1811	Parasol; 1800	Prunella
Sire Gladiator (GB) br. 1833	Pauline (GB) br. 1826	Moses br. 1819	Seymour
Sire Gladiator (GB) br. 1833	Pauline (GB) br. 1826	Moses br. 1819	Gohanna mare
Sire Gladiator (GB) br. 1833	Pauline (GB) br. 1826	Quadrille; 1815	Selim
Sire Gladiator (GB) br. 1833	Pauline (GB) br. 1826	Quadrille; 1815	Canary Bird
Dam Lollypop (GB) ch. 1836	Voltaire (GB) b. 1826	Blacklock* ch. 1814	Whitelock*
Dam Lollypop (GB) ch. 1836	Voltaire (GB) b. 1826	Blacklock* ch. 1814	Coriander mare*
Dam Lollypop (GB) ch. 1836	Voltaire (GB) b. 1826	Phantom mare 1816	Phantom
Dam Lollypop (GB) ch. 1836	Voltaire (GB) b. 1826	Phantom mare 1816	Overton mare
Dam Lollypop (GB) ch. 1836	Belinda (GB) gr. 1823	Blacklock* ch. 1814	Whitelock*
Dam Lollypop (GB) ch. 1836	Belinda (GB) gr. 1823	Blacklock* ch. 1814	Coriander mare*
Dam Lollypop (GB) ch. 1836	Belinda (GB) gr. 1823	Wagtail gr. 1818	Prime Minister
Dam Lollypop (GB) ch. 1836	Belinda (GB) gr. 1823	Wagtail gr. 1818	Orville mare

Note: b. = Bay, br. = Brown, ch. = Chestnut, gr. = Grey

* Sweetmeat is inbred 3D x 3D to the stallion Blacklock, meaning that he appears third generation twice on the dam side of his pedigree.

== See also ==
- List of leading Thoroughbred racehorses
