= Sir Bevys =

British-bred Thoroughbred racehorse

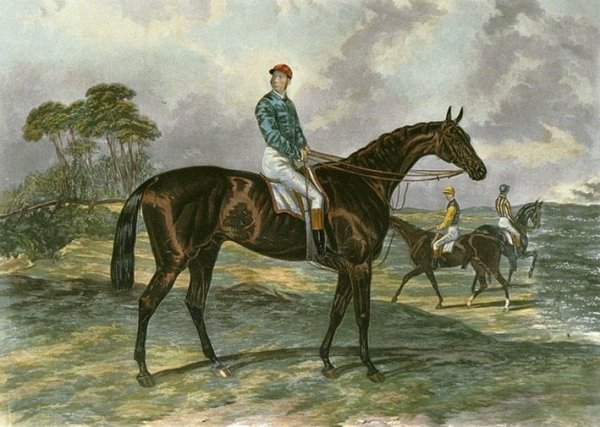
- Sir Bevys: Engraving by D George Thompson after a picture by James E Doyle
- Sire: Favonius
- Grandsire: Parmeasan
- Dam: Lady Langden
- Damsire: Kettledrum
- Sex: Stallion
- Foaled: 1876
- Country: United Kingdom of Great Britain and Ireland
- Colour: Brown
- Breeder: Lord Norreys
- Owner: Lionel de Rothschild
- Trainer: Joseph Hayhoe
- Record: 6: 2-1-0
- Earnings: £7,372

Major wins
- Epsom Derby (1879)

Sir Bevys (1876–1896) was a British Thoroughbred racehorse and sire. In a career that lasted from 1878 to 1879 he ran six times and won two races. His most important success came in the 1879 Epsom Derby: his only other win was in a selling race. At the end of the 1879 season he was retired to stud where he had little success.

== Background ==
Sir Bevys was a dark brown "almost black" colt standing 15.2 hands high bred at Wytham, Oxfordshire by Lord Norreys. He was sold to Lionel de Rothschild, who used the name “Mr Acton” for his racing interests. Sir Bevys was sent into training with Rothschild's private trainer Joseph Hayhoe at the Palace House stable at Newmarket, Suffolk.

Sir Bevys's sire, Favonius, a male-line descendant of the Byerley Turk, had won the Derby for Meyer de Rothschild in 1871, but sired few other notable horses. His dam, Lady Langden, was an unraced half sister to the St Leger winner Caller Ou. Apart from Sir Bevys, she was notable for producing Hampton, an outstanding stayer who became a successful and influential sire.

== Racing career ==
=== 1878: two-year-old season ===
Sir Bevys won one race from four starts as a two-year-old. He began his career by running unplaced in the Fernhill Stakes at Ascot and a minor race Newmarket in summer. In autumn, he returned to Newmarket and ran twice in two days. On 1 October he won a £187 selling race and on the following day he finished second to Out of Bounds in the Ditch Mile Nursery Handicap.

=== 1879: three-year-old season ===
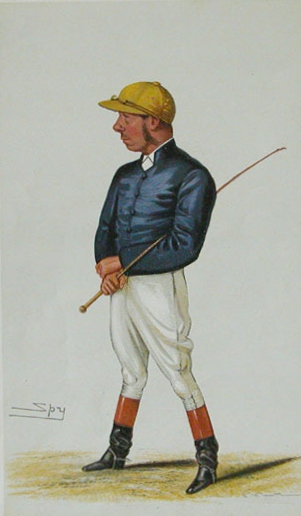
George Fordham, who came back from retirement to win his first Derby on Sir Bevys

Sir Bevys appeared in the betting lists for the Derby in April, when he was offered at odds of 50/1. He was backed down to 25/1, but drifted out again after appearing to lack the "dash" of a Derby winner, although in May Bell's Life reported that his performances in training had improved.

Sir Bevys made his 1879 debut on 28 May in the 100th Derby at Epsom, where the large crowd included the Prince and Princess of Wales and other members of the Royal Family. The day was sunny and warm, but the ground was very soft after previous heavy rain. He started at odds of 20/1 in a field of twenty-three, with Cadogan being made the 9/2 favourite. Ridden by George Fordham, Sir Bevys broke badly and was left many lengths behind the other runners, who were led in the early stages by Protectionaist and Caxtonian. Fordham made up the lost ground gradually and was just behind the leading group at the turn into the straight. In the last quarter mile Visconti went to the front and looked the likely winner, but Sir Bevys appeared "from goodness knows where" to take the lead and then hold off the challenge of the 100/1 outsider Palmbearer to win by three-quarters of a length. Despite the defeat of the more fancied runners, the result was a popular one, mainly on account of the winning jockey: Fordham was a veteran who had returned from illness, alcoholism and near bankruptcy to win his first Derby at the age of 41. The best contemporary explanation offered for the upset, apart from the generally low quality of the race, was that Sir Bevys was the only horse to cope successfully with the very heavy conditions. A much later report credits Fordham with having identified a stretch of better ground on which to make his decisive move. The winning time was the slowest for more than twenty years and remains the second slowest ever recorded.

The identity of "Mr Acton", the winning owner, was not entirely clear: it was known that he was a member of the Rothschild family, but many seemed to believe "Mr Acton" was in fact Lionel's son, Leopold de Rothschild, who was known to have won several very large bets on the race. Subsequent events made the issue less clear: the death of Lionel de Rothschild on 3 June 1879, was reported to have made all of Sir Bevys's entries void, preventing him from running in the Grand Prix de Paris on 8 June, but the colt's entry for the St Leger was apparently unaffected.

In the St Leger at Doncaster on 10 September Sir Bevys started 3/1 joint favourite with Rayon d'Or. Ridden by Tom Cannon, he settled towards the middle of the seventeen horse field but made no progress in the later stages and finished a remote eighth behind Rayon d'Or. The fact that both Palmbearer and Visconti were also unplaced convinced some observers that the Derby form was virtually worthless. By late autumn Sir Bevys had developed respiratory problems (a "roaring ailment") and was retired from racing.

== Assessment ==
Sir Bevys has been described as “very moderate”, and as possibly “the worst ever” winner of the Derby.

== Stud career ==
Sir Bevys retired to stud at a modest fee of 10 guineas. The best of his offspring was probably the black colt Morglay, who won the Ascot Derby and the Queen's Vase at Royal Ascot in 1889, although his biggest winner was the filly Primrose Day who won the Cesarewitch Handicap in the same year. Sir Bevys died in March 1896 following a "general break-up of his system."

== Sire line tree ==
- Sir Bevys
  - Aladdin
  - Banter
  - Bevil
  - The Vicar
  - Mountain Knight
  - Country Boy
  - Beaver
  - Theodore
  - The Rector
  - Morglay
  - Chilton Boy

== Pedigree ==
Pedigree of Sir Bevys (GB), brown stallion, 1876
Sire Favonius (GB) 1868	Parmesan; 1857	Sweetmeat	Gladiator*
Sire Favonius (GB) 1868	Parmesan; 1857	Sweetmeat	Lollypop
Sire Favonius (GB) 1868	Parmesan; 1857	Gruyere	Verulam
Sire Favonius (GB) 1868	Parmesan; 1857	Gruyere	Jennala
Sire Favonius (GB) 1868	Zephyr; 1862	King Tom	Harkaway
Sire Favonius (GB) 1868	Zephyr; 1862	King Tom	Pocahontas*
Sire Favonius (GB) 1868	Zephyr; 1862	Mentmore Lass	Melbourne
Sire Favonius (GB) 1868	Zephyr; 1862	Mentmore Lass	Emerald
Dam Lady Langden (GB) 1868	Kettledrum; 1858	Rataplan	The Baron
Dam Lady Langden (GB) 1868	Kettledrum; 1858	Rataplan	Pocahontas*
Dam Lady Langden (GB) 1868	Kettledrum; 1858	Hybla	The Provost
Dam Lady Langden (GB) 1868	Kettledrum; 1858	Hybla	Otisina
Dam Lady Langden (GB) 1868	Haricot; 1847	Lanercost	Liverpool
Dam Lady Langden (GB) 1868	Haricot; 1847	Lanercost	Otis
Dam Lady Langden (GB) 1868	Haricot; 1847	Queen Mary	Gladiator*
Dam Lady Langden (GB) 1868	Haricot; 1847	Queen Mary	Plenipotentiary mare (Family: 10-a)

* Sir Bevys is inbred 4S x 4D to the stallion Gladiator, meaning that he appears fourth generation on the sire side of his pedigree and fourth generation on the dam side of his pedigree.

* Sir Bevys is inbred 4S x 4D to the mare Pocahontas, meaning that she appears fourth generation on the sire side of his pedigree and fourth generation on the dam side of his pedigree.
