= Craven Stakes =

Flat horse race in Britain

- Class: Group 3
- Location: Rowley Mile; Newmarket, England
- Inaugurated: 1771 (original version); 1878 (current version)
- Race type: Flat / Thoroughbred
- Sponsor: Bet365
- Website: Newmarket

Race information
- Distance: 1 mile (1,609 metres)
- Surface: Turf
- Track: Straight
- Qualification: Three-year-old colts and geldings
- Weight: 9 st 2 lb
- Purse: £85,000 (2025); 1st: £48,204

Craven Stakes
2026
Oxagon	Avicenna	Hidden Force

Previous years
2025
Field Of Gold	Wimbledon Hawkeye	Aomori City
2024
Haatem	Eben Shaddad	Sons And Lovers
2023
Indestructible	The Foxes	Dancing Magic
2022
Native Trail	Claymore	Hoo Ya Mal
2021
Master of The Seas	La Barrosa	Mystery Smiles

2020-2011
2019
Skardu	Momkin	Set Piece
2018
Masar	White Mocha	Roaring Lion
2017
Eminent	Rivet	Benbatl
2016
Stormy Antarctic	Foundation	Shogun
2015
Kool Kompany	Nafaqa	Moheet
2014
Toormore	The Grey Gatsby	Postponed
2013
Toronado	Havana Gold	Dundonnell
2012
Trumpet Major	Crius	Eastern Sun
2011
Native Khan	Libranno	Yaseer

2010-2001
2010
Elusive Pimpernel	Dancing David	Critical Moment
2009
Delegator	Sans Frontieres	Pure Poetry
2008
Twice Over	Raven's Pass	The Bogberry
2007
Adagio	Sonny Red	Thousand Words
2006
Killybegs	Metropolitan Man	Gin Jockey
2005
Democratic Deficit	Rob Roy	Kandidate
2004
Haafhd	Three Valleys	Peak To Creek
2003
Hurricane Alan	Lundy's Lane	Splendid Era
2002
King Of Happiness	Della Francesca	Sweet Band
2001
King's Ironbridge	Red Carpet	Nayef

2000-1991
2000
Umistim	King's Best	Ekraar
1999
Compton Admiral	Brancaster	Debbie's Warning
1998
Xaar	Gulland	Circus
1997
Desert Story	Grapeshot	Cape Cross
1996
Beauchamp King	Alhaarth	Polaris Flight
1995
Painter's Row	Montjoy	Nwaamis
1994
King's Theatre	Colonel Collins	Suplizi
1993
Emperor Jones	Wharf	Ventiquattrofogli
1992
Alnasr Alwasheek	Dr Devious	Irish Memory
1991
Marju	Desert Sun	Hokusai

1990-1981
1990
Tirol	Sure Sharp	Shavian
1989
Shaadi	Exbourne	Citidancer
1988
Doyoun	Warning	Galitzin
1987
Ajdal	Don't Forget Me	Most Welcome
1986
Dancing Brave	Faraway Dancer	Mashkour
1985
Shadeed	Damister	Heraldiste
1984
Lear Fan	Rainbow Quest	Telios
1983
Muscatite	Spanish Place	Guns of Navarone
1982
Chalon	Merlin's Charm	Triple Tipple
1981
Kind of Hush	To-Agori-Mou	Dalby Mustang

1980-1971
1980
Tyrnavos	Star Way	World Leader
1979
Lyphard's Wish	Tromos	Warmington
1978
Admirals' Launch	Tannenberg	Taxiarchos
1977
Limone	Sporting Yankee	Lucky Sovereign
1976
Malinowski	Oats	Whistlefield
1975
No Alimony	Bolkonski	Sefton Court
1974
Numa	Colonel Nelson	Son of Silver
1973
My Drifter	Freefoot	So Royal
1972
Leicester	Steel Pulse	Brambleberry
1971
Levanter	Tula Rocket	Seaepic

1970-1966
1970
Tamil	Gold Rod	Rock Roi
1969
Paddy's Progress	Fascination	Harmony Hall
1968
Petingo	Milltown	Relentless
1967
Sloop	Palatch	Persister
1966
Salvo	Out of Orbit	Parbury

The Craven Stakes is a Group 3 flat horse race in Great Britain open to three-year-old colts and geldings. It is run over a distance of 1 mile (1,609 metres) on the Rowley Mile at Newmarket in mid-April.

== History ==
The event is named after William Craven, 6th Baron Craven, a member of the Jockey Club in the 18th century. His support for racing at Newmarket led to the introduction of the Craven Meeting in 1771.

The first race had a subscription of 5 guineas, to which 21 subscribed. It was to be run "from the ditch to the turn of the lands." The race was won by Pantaloon, owned by a Mr Vernon. Fourteen horses had taken part.

An open-age version of the Craven Stakes was staged annually until the 1870s. It traditionally took place on a Monday in April, and was usually Newmarket's first race of the season. Several other venues had a race of the same name.

The present race, a one-mile event for three-year-olds, was established in 1878. The inaugural running was won by Thurio.

The modern version of the Craven Stakes can serve as a trial for the 2,000 Guineas. The first horse to win both races was Scot Free in 1884. The most recent was Haafhd in 2004.

The Craven Stakes is currently held on the second day (Wednesday) of Newmarket's three-day Craven Meeting.

== Records ==
Most successful horse (3 wins):

- Woodpecker – 1778, 1779, 1781

Leading jockey since 1878 (6 wins):

- Morny Cannon – Harbinger (1893), Sempronius (1894), Guernsey (1897), Solennis (1899), Port Blair (1902), His Eminence (1906)

Leading trainer since 1878 (8 wins):

- Sir Michael Stoute – Shadeed (1985), Ajdal (1987), Doyoun (1988), Shaadi (1989), Alnasr Alwasheek (1992), Desert Story (1997), King of Happiness (2002), Adagio (2007)

== Winners since 1900 ==
Year	Winner	Jockey	Trainer	Time
1900	Headpiece	Sam Loates
1901	Rigo	Otto Madden		1:49.60
1902	Port Blair	Mornington Cannon		1:49.60
1903	Countermark
1904	Airlie	Harry Aylin	George Lambton
1905	St Oswald	William Halsey	John Porter
1906	His Eminence	Mornington Cannon	Charles Beatty
1907	Slieve Gallion	Billy Higgs	Sam Darling
1908	Abandoned due to snow
1909	Howick	William Halsey	Sandy Braime
1910	Neil Gow	Danny Maher	Percy Peck
1911	Irish King	Danny Maher	Samuel Pickering
1912	Jingling Geordie	Frank Wootton	Sam Darling
1913	Sanquhar	Danny Maher	Percy Peck
1914	Kennymore	Frank O'Neill	Alec Taylor Jr.
1915	Rossendale	James Clark	Hazleton
1916 (dh)	Roi d'Ecosse; Sir Dighton	Steve Donoghue; Herbert Jomes	Atty Persse; Richard Marsh
1917	Dansellon	Ralph Watson	Atty Persse	1:40.80
1918	Benevente	Jack Evans	Bobby Dewhurst
1919	Buchan	Jack Brennan	Alec Taylor Jr.
1920	Daylight Patrol	Snowy Whalley	John Watson
1921	Meeting Abandoned due to a National Coal Strike
1922	Collaborator	Charlie Elliott	Jack Jarvis	1:42.20
1923	Light Hand	Frank Bullock	Alec Taylor Jr.	1:41.40
1924	St Germans	Frank Bullock	Alec Taylor Jr.	1:39.20
1925	Picaroon	Frank Bullock	Alec Taylor Jr.	1:39.20
1926	Harpagon	Charlie Elliott	Jack Jarvis	1:40.00
1927	Tattoo	Richard Perryman	John Watson	1:43.20
1928	Royal Minstrel	Joe Childs	Cecil Boyd-Rochfort	1:37.00
1929	Cragadour	Richard Perryman	Joseph Lawson	1:38.00
1930	Writ	Bobby Dick	Joseph Lawson	1:40.20
1931	Philae	Tommy Weston	Dundas	1:39.40
1932	Loaningdale	Joe Childs	Cecil Boyd-Rochfort	1:46.00
1933	Lochiel	Gordon Richards	Fred Darling	1:41.00
1934	Colombo	Rae Johnstone	Tommy Hogg	1:39.00
1935	Buckleigh	Gordon Richards	Tommy Hogg	1:39.00
1936	Monument	Rufus Beasley	Cecil Boyd-Rochfort	1:38.80
1937	Snowfall	Richard Perryman	Colledge Leader	1:44.20
1938	Challenge	Eph Smith	Jack Jarvis	1:42.00
1939	Signal Light	Rufus Beasley	Cecil Boyd-Rochfort	1:40.60
1940	Prince Tetra	Arthur Wragg	Fred Templeman	1:48.20
1941	Morogoro	Harry Wragg	Fred Darling	1:42.80
	no race 1942-45
1946	Gulf Stream	Harry Wragg	Walter Earl	1:39.40
1947	Migoli	Doug Smith	Frank Butters	1:46.00
1948	My Babu	Charlie Smirke	Sam Armstrong	1:40.80
1949	Moondust	Doug Smith	Frank Butters	1:39.40
1950	Rising Flame	Geoff Littlewood	Charles Elsey	1:42.60
1951	Claudius	Doug Page	Dick Warden	1:46.80
1952	Kara Tepe	Manny Mercer	George Colling	1:40.60
1953	Oleandrin	Gordon Richards	Harvey Leader	1:38.71
1954	Ambler II	Harry Carr	Cecil Boyd-Rochfort	1:42.09
1955	True Cavalier	Snowy Fawden	Harvey Leader	1:44.17
1956	Pirate King	Willie Snaith	Humphrey Cottrill	1:41.09
1957	Shearwater	Lester Piggott	Noel Murless	1:42.60
1958	Bald Eagle	Harry Carr	Cecil Boyd-Rochfort	1:43.08
1959	Pindari	Lester Piggott	Noel Murless	1:46.15
1960	Tudorich	Scobie Breasley	Sir Gordon Richards	1:42.92
1961	Aurelius	Lester Piggott	Noel Murless	1:43.29
1962	High Noon	Edward Hide	Bill Elsey	1:44.06
1963	Crocket	Doug Smith	Geoffrey Brooke	1:44.39
1964	Young Christopher	Ron Sheather	Freddie Maxwell	1:38.64
1965	Corifi	Geoff Lewis	Staff Ingham	1:42.28
1966	Salvo	Frankie Durr	Harry Wragg	1:43.38
1967	Sloop	Greville Starkey	John Oxley	1:40.78
1968	Petingo	Joe Mercer	Sam Armstrong	1:42.70
1969	Paddy's Progress	Sandy Barclay	Noel Murless	1:48.11
1970	Tamil	Willie Carson	Bernard van Cutsem	1:45.10
1971	Levanter	Tony Murray	Ryan Price	1:42.11
1972	Leicester	Geoff Lewis	Noel Murless	1:47.09
1973	My Drifter	Eric Eldin	John Sutcliffe jr.	1:38.12
1974	Numa	Pat Eddery	Peter Walwyn	1:40.24
1975	No Alimony	Pat Eddery	Peter Walwyn	1:52.47
1976	Malinowski	Lester Piggott	Vincent O'Brien	1:36.88
1977	Limone	Greville Starkey	Guy Harwood	1:40.47
1978	Admirals' Launch	Willie Carson	Dick Hern	1:43.81
1979	Lyphard's Wish	Joe Mercer	Henry Cecil	1:41.24
1980	Tyrnavos	Edward Hide	Bruce Hobbs	1:41.87
1981	Kind of Hush	Steve Cauthen	Barry Hills	1:42.51
1982	Silver Hawk	Tony Murray	Michael Albina	1:39.61
1983	Muscatite	Brian Taylor	Jeremy Hindley	1:47.23
1984	Lear Fan	Greville Starkey	Guy Harwood	1:38.12
1985	Shadeed	Walter Swinburn	Michael Stoute	1:38.84
1986	Dancing Brave	Greville Starkey	Guy Harwood	1:49.96
1987	Ajdal	Walter Swinburn	Michael Stoute	1:39.49
1988	Doyoun	Walter Swinburn	Michael Stoute	1:38.48
1989	Shaadi	Walter Swinburn	Michael Stoute	1:43.76
1990	Tirol	Pat Eddery	Richard Hannon Sr.	1:38.38
1991	Marju	Willie Carson	John Dunlop	1:36.12
1992	Alnasr Alwasheek	Steve Cauthen	Michael Stoute	1:37.39
1993	Emperor Jones	Ray Cochrane	John Gosden	1:37.80
1994	King's Theatre	Michael Kinane	Henry Cecil	1:43.42
1995	Painter's Row	John Reid	Peter Chapple-Hyam	1:37.08
1996	Beauchamp King	John Reid	John Dunlop	1:37.82
1997	Desert Story	Michael Kinane	Michael Stoute	1:38.08
1998	Xaar	Olivier Peslier	André Fabre	1:42.31
1999	Compton Admiral	Frankie Dettori	Gerard Butler	1:38.72
2000	Umistim	Richard Hughes	Richard Hannon Sr.	1:41.11
2001	King's Ironbridge	Richard Hughes	Richard Hannon Sr.	1:42.25
2002	King of Happiness	Kieren Fallon	Michael Stoute	1:37.39
2003	Hurricane Alan	Jimmy Fortune	Richard Hannon Sr.	1:39.93
2004	Haafhd	Richard Hills	Barry Hills	1:38.33
2005	Democratic Deficit	Kevin Manning	Jim Bolger	1:39.43
2006	Killybegs	Michael Hills	Barry Hills	1:38.79
2007	Adagio	Kerrin McEvoy	Michael Stoute	1:35.55
2008	Twice Over	Ted Durcan	Henry Cecil	1:38.54
2009	Delegator	Jamie Spencer	Brian Meehan	1:36.56
2010	Elusive Pimpernel	Ryan Moore	John Dunlop	1:37.16
2011	Native Khan	Kieren Fallon	Ed Dunlop	1:37.56
2012	Trumpet Major	Ryan Moore	Richard Hannon Sr.	1:37.44
2013	Toronado	Richard Hughes	Richard Hannon Sr.	1:35.19
2014	Toormore	Ryan Moore	Richard Hannon Jr.	1:35.42
2015	Kool Kompany	Richard Hughes	Richard Hannon Jr.	1:38.86
2016	Stormy Antarctic	George Baker	Ed Walker	1:44.01
2017	Eminent	Jim Crowley	Martyn Meade	1:35.15
2018	Masar	William Buick	Charlie Appleby	1:38.15
2019	Skardu	James Doyle	William Haggas	1:37.89
	no race 2020 (Note: The 2020 running was cancelled because of the COVID-19 pandemic in the United Kingdom)
2021	Master of The Seas	William Buick	Charlie Appleby	1:38.79
2022	Native Trail	William Buick	Charlie Appleby	1:35.91
2023	Indestructible	Kevin Stott	Karl Burke	1:39.78
2024	Haatem	Sean Levey	Richard Hannon Jr.	1:35.09
2025	Field Of Gold	Kieran Shoemark	John & Thady Gosden	1:39.26
2026	Oxagon	Oisin Murphy	John & Thady Gosden	1:37.21

== Earlier winners ==
=== Original version ===
- 1771: Pantaloon
- 1772: Jason
- 1773: Firetail
- 1774: Sweetwilliam
- 1775: Barbary
- 1776: Hephestion
- 1777: Maiden
- 1778: Woodpecker
- 1779: Woodpecker
- 1780: Triumph
- 1781: Woodpecker
- 1782: Potoooooooo
- 1783: Alaric
- 1784: Buzaglo
- 1785: Dungannon
- 1786: Premier
- 1787: Ulysses
- 1788: Mufti
- 1789: Thorn
- 1790: Bullfinch
- 1791: Mufti
- 1792: Minos
- 1793: Buzzard
- 1794: Buzzard
- 1795: Kitt Carr
- 1796: Play or Pay
- 1797: Hambletonian
- 1798: Aimator
- 1799: Spoliator
- 1800: Oscar
- 1801: Eagle
- 1802: Cockfighter
- 1803: Eagle
- 1804: Aniseed
- 1805: Ditto
- 1806: Sir David
- 1807: Selim
- 1808: Deceiver
- 1809: Violante
- 1810: Rubens
- 1811: Recorder
- 1812: Flash
- 1813: Offas's Dyke
- 1814: Slender Billy
- 1815: Wire
- 1816: Bourbon
- 1817: Roller
- 1818: Skim
- 1819: Cannon Ball
- 1820: Antar
- 1821: colt by Comus
- 1822: Godolphin
- 1823: Scarborough
- 1824: Vargas
- 1825: Longwaist
- 1826: Trinculo
- 1827: The Alderman
- 1828: Lamplighter
- 1829: Zinganee
- 1830: Seraph
- 1831: Priam
- 1832: Chapman
- 1833: Camarine
- 1834: Colwick
- 1835: Plenipotentiary
- 1836: Redshank
- 1837: Flock
- 1838: Redshank
- 1839: Quo Minus
- 1840: Scroggins
- 1841: Epirus
- 1842: The Currier
- 1843: Ma Mie
- 1844: Corranna
- 1847: King of Morven
- 1850: Retail
- 1851: Sotterley
- 1852: Lady Agnes
- 1853: Ariosto
- 1854: Calamus
- 1855: Orinoco
- 1856: Napoleon III
- 1857: Flacrow
- 1858: Fisherman
- 1859: Sedbury
- 1860: Cynricus
- 1861: Crater
- 1862: Blackcock
- 1863: Romanoff
- 1864: Bathilde
- 1865: Pirate
- 1866: Mazeppa
- 1867: Lord Lyon
- 1868: Lady Coventry
- 1869: Blue Gown
- 1870: Rosicrucian
- 1871: Panoplite
- 1872: Sterling
- 1873: Prince Charlie
- 1874: Drummond
- 1875: Gang Forward
- 1876–77: no race

=== Current version ===
- 1878: Thurio
- 1879: Discord
- 1880: Fernandez
- 1881: Cameliard
- 1882: Laureate
- 1883: Grandmaster
- 1884: Scot Free
- 1885: Esterling
- 1886: Grey Friars
- 1887: The Baron
- 1888: Orbit
- 1889: Gay Hampton
- 1890: Morion
- 1891: Friar Lubin
- 1892: The Lover
- 1893: Harbinger
- 1894: Sempronius
- 1895: The Owl
- 1896: Lord Hervey
- 1897: Guernsey
- 1898: Jeddah
- 1899: Solennis

== See also ==
- Horse racing in Great Britain
- List of British flat horse races
