= Macbeth II =

American Thoroughbred racehorse

- Sire: Macduff
- Grandsire: Macaroon
- Dam: Agnes
- Damsire: Gilroy
- Sex: Gelding
- Foaled: 1885
- Country: United States
- Colour: Bay
- Breeder: Rufus Lisle
- Owner: Chicago Stable
- Trainer: John S. Campbell
- Record: 106: 25-21-14
- Earnings: $22,170

Major wins
- Kimball Stakes (1887); Kansas City Derby (1888); Gayoso Hotel Stakes (1888); Peabody Hotel Stakes (1888); Green Stakes (1890); Highweight Handicap (1890); Clifton Handicap (1891); New Jersey Handicap (1891); New Year's Handicap (1891) American Classic Race wins: Kentucky Derby (1888)

Macbeth II (foaled 1885 in Kentucky) was a horse who was the winner of the 1888 Kentucky Derby. He was the third gelding and one of only nine geldings to win the Kentucky Derby, with the others being Vagrant (1876), Apollo (1882), Old Rosebud (1914), Exterminator (1918), Paul Jones (1920), Clyde Van Dusen (1929), Funny Cide (2003), and Mine That Bird (2009).

== Background ==
Macbeth was foaled at Lisland, the breeding farm of Rufus Lisle which was located two miles northwest of Lexington, Kentucky in an area called Leestown Pike. Lisle was widely known in the Thoroughbred racing circuit for refusing to pay for stud services, instead breeding his mares to stallions whose services he could obtain for free. This policy served him well because he consistently produced winners like Castaway II, 1890 Brooklyn Handicap winner. Macbeth raced at a time when the Kentucky Derby was not as highly regarded as it is today. Gelded at a young age, he was sired by Macduff, the 1881 Champagne Stakes winner and a son of the imported British stallion Macaroon. Macduff also sired the colt McChesney, one of the top 3-year-olds in 1902, but was euthanized in 1899 after he lost popularity as a stud and no buyers could be found nor anyone willing to take him for free. Macbeth's dam was Agnes (by Gilroy), who also produced 1890 Tennessee Derby winner and third-place Kentucky Derby runner Robespierre.

As a three-year-old, Macbeth stood 15.2 hands high.

== Racing career ==
Macbeth was owned as a two-year and three-year-old by the Chicago Stable, a partnership between horse trainer John Campbell and George Hankins, with Hankins becoming sole owner in October 1888. Hankins was a prominent Chicago gambler who soared to fame in the 1880s and '90s, accumulating great wealth but losing it all by 1900.

Macbeth won one stakes race as a two-year-old, the Kimball Stakes at Latonia Race Track. Entering his three-year-old season, he was not well-regarded, and his first win was in a claiming race, despite being entered as not to be sold. He first became a serious Kentucky Derby contender at the 1888 Memphis spring race meeting, where he won two stakes races and set a new track record. However, his success was limited at the Nashville meeting that followed, leading to Macbeth going off at somewhat higher odds in the Kentucky Derby.

In the 1888 Kentucky Derby, Macbeth was not an obvious choice for the win, with Gallifet being the favorite. Gallifet and The Chevalier were clear contenders from the start of the race, with Macbeth not gaining a lead until a mile into the race. He won by a length over Gallifet at 6:1 odds, winning $4,740 for Hankins. Macbeth II, being a gelding with no possible career at stud, raced until he was eight years old. His performance later in his career may have been hampered by an illness in the winter of 1888–1889. As an older horse, he was used for training new exercise riders due to his gentleness. He was noted as running in an 1890 claiming race at Sheepshead Bay Race Track in New York. In October 1890, Hankins dispersed his stable, after which Macbeth went through a succession of owners. He most notably won the 1891 New Year's Handicap at Clifton for William Angel. Macbeth was trained for steeplechasing in 1894 after his flat-racing career, but never started over jumps.

A 1910 Daily Racing Form article states that Macbeth was purchased as a saddle horse by a gentleman that lived in Chicago and was often seen in Lincoln Park with his new owner. He is reported to have died at an advanced age.

== Pedigree ==
Pedigree of Macbeth II
Sire Macduff 1879	Macaroon 1871	Macaroni	Sweetmeat
Sire Macduff 1879	Macaroon 1871	Macaroni	Jocose
Sire Macduff 1879	Macaroon 1871	Songstress	Chanticleer
Sire Macduff 1879	Macaroon 1871	Songstress	Mrs Carter
Sire Macduff 1879	Jersey Lass 1874	King Ernest	King Tom
Sire Macduff 1879	Jersey Lass 1874	King Ernest	Ernestine
Sire Macduff 1879	Jersey Lass 1874	Jersey Belle	Australian
Sire Macduff 1879	Jersey Lass 1874	Jersey Belle	Aerolite
Dam Agnes 1876	Gilroy 1862	Lexington	Boston
Dam Agnes 1876	Gilroy 1862	Lexington	Alice Carneal
Dam Agnes 1876	Gilroy 1862	Magnolia	Glencoe*
Dam Agnes 1876	Gilroy 1862	Magnolia	Myrtle
Dam Agnes 1876	Laura Bruce 1856	Star Davis	Glencoe*
Dam Agnes 1876	Laura Bruce 1856	Star Davis	Margaret Wood
Dam Agnes 1876	Laura Bruce 1856	Alida	Buford
Dam Agnes 1876	Laura Bruce 1856	Alida	Sarpsusette

* MacBeth is inbred 4D × 4D to the stallion Glencoe, meaning that he appears fourth generation twice on the dam side of his pedigree.
