= Tom Chaloner =

English jockey

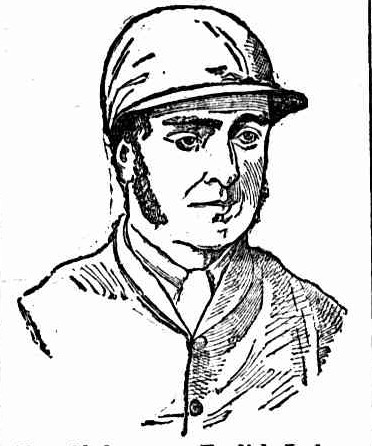
- Sketch of Tom Chaloner from Australian Town and Country Journal

Personal information
- Born: 2 June 1839 Manchester, England
- Died: 3 April 1886 (aged 46)
- Occupations: Jockey and Trainer

Horse racing career
- Sport: Horse racing

Major racing wins
- Major races 2,000 Guineas Stakes (1863, 1868 (dead heat), 1873); Epsom Derby (1863); Epsom Oaks (1862); St Leger (1861, 1862, 1867, 1868, 1875)

Significant horses
- Achievement, Caller Ou, Craig Millar, Feu de Joie, Formosa, Gang Forward, Macaroni, The Marquis

Tom Chaloner (2 June 1839 – 3 April 1886) was an English jockey who won ten British Classic races, each of them except the 1,000 Guineas at least once. Although he won races across the country, his most notable came in the north of England.

== Early life ==
Chaloner was born in Manchester on 2 June 1839, to Thomas Chaloner and Mary Thomson. He was baptized on 10 July 1839 in Manchester Cathedral. In September 1852, along with his two brothers Willie and Dick, he moved to Ashgill in Yorkshire to work for trainer John Osborne. He fell in love with Osborne's daughter, Ellen, and married her in spring of 1865. He had eight children with her. The family lived at Spring Cottage, Malton, North Yorkshire.

== Racing career ==
=== 1850s ===
His first public ride was at Carlisle in June 1853, riding at 4 st 7 lbs. His first win came in a selling stakes at Liverpool on Thursday 12 July 1855. Osborne took him on as apprentice for years, thinking him to have great skill and judgement.

Over the next couple of years, he won a number of races which helped establish his reputation. In 1856, he won the Northumberland Plate on Zeta for Lord Zetland. Then in 1857, he took the Great Northern Handicap on Skirmisher, and on Vedette, the Doncaster Cup. His "quiet and unassuming manner... [and] undeniable talent" meant he was soon in demand.

He won the Great Metropolitan Handicap on Telegram at the start of 1858, and, building an association with some of the leading owners of the time, he won the Bath and Somersetshire Stakes on East Langton, the Royal Hunt Cup on Hesperithusa, the Chesterfield Stakes on Peggy Taft, and the Chesterfield Cup on Sunbeam. 1859 was less successful.

=== 1860s ===
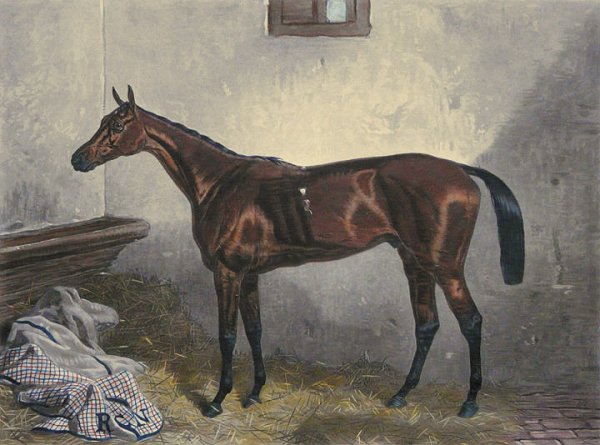
Macaroni, on which Chaloner won the Derby, painted by Harry Hall in 1863

He won the 1860 Goodwood Stakes on Wallace and Liverpool July Cup on Moorcock. He also rode in the Derby for the first time, finishing third behind Thormanby on Horror. His biggest win of the season was in the Doncaster Cup on Sabreur, but getting his first ride in the St Leger at the same track, he finished nowhere on Wallace.

He had his first ride in the 2,000 Guineas in 1861 on Gardener, though the horse performed poorly. Later in the year, though, he won his first Classic, the St Leger on the filly Caller Ou for William l’Anson. The horse was a 100/1 outsider, and beat the Derby winner Kettledrum to win it. The race was a "brilliant affair", with Chaloner, and Kettledrum's jockey, Luke Snowden, "riding as if for their lives". Chaloner was not even the original jockey for the race. Jemmy Grimshaw, who had been approached to ride, thought so little of the horse, that he begged to be allowed to ride Camerino instead.

The win brought Chaloner to the attention of trainer Jem Godding, who invited him to Newmarket to ride for him. For Godding, he won the 1862 Oaks on Feu de Joie, owned by gambler Richard Naylor. Chaloner won a second St Leger the same year, on The Marquis. However, he was once again unsuccessful in the 2,000 Guineas, riding Caterer.

The next year changed that. Naylor also owned a horse called Macaroni which lost its only race as a two-year-old in a two horse race, but in which Naylor had confidence. He backed him throughout the winter to win the following year's Derby. Chaloner was booked to ride throughout the horse's three-year-old season.

After winning the 1863 2,000 Guineas on Macaroni, beating Saccharometer, the horse went to the 1863 Derby as well. The race was run in appalling wet weather, the first wet weather Derby since 1857, and took 34 false starts before getting underway. Horses were "almost up to their fetlocks in dir". Macaroni had in fact tried to bolt on the way down to the start, and several other horse became fractious as they waited.

Tattenham Corner was treacherous, and as the runners bunched on the turn, jockey D Hughes on second favourite, and vanquished Guineas rival, Saccharometer screamed for room. Saccharometer clipped the heels of the horse in front and fell heavily. Another horse, Fantastic, jumped over the stricken Saccharometer and fell on his nose and knees, bringing down Johnny Daley on King of the Vale in the process. At this point, Macaroni was behind Lord Clifden, ridden by George Fordham. At the furlong marker Lord Clifden was still ahead, but Fordham looked round at a crucial moment, allowing Chaloner to take his chance. Fordham then switched his whip, Lord Clifden faltered twice, the second time after treading on a piece of orange peel, and Macaroni was forced up to win by a head. Some were sure Lord Clifden won, and remained so years afterwards. It was called one of the "most gallant finishes ever witnessed".

From l'Anson, Chaloner picked up a ride on Blair Athol, winner of the 1864 Derby. The horse's regular jockey, Jim Snowden was an alcoholic, so Chaloner was made his replacement for the valuable Grand Prix de Paris at Longchamp. The voyage was rough and the welcome cold. On course, Chaloner was threatened with physical attack and the crowd threw things at horse and jockey on the way to the start. Nonetheless, Blair Athol finished second.

Chaloner won further St Legers on Achievement (1867) and Formosa (1868), and dead heated for the 1868 2,000 Guineas on Moslem in a finish that "will never be forgotten". He also won the 1869 Middle Park Plate on Frivolity, beating the highly regarded Sunshine and Kingcraft.

=== 1870s and retirement ===
He won the 1870 Ascot Stakes on Musket, and, in the same week, the 1870 Alexandra Plate on Trocadero. He did not win any of the biggest races of 1871, but his "nerve, judgement, and resolute style of finishing" were still in evidence, and although losing on Sterling in the Cambridgeshire Handicap, it is said he was "never seen to greater advantage".

Among 29 victories in 1872, were the Alexandra Plate on Musket, the Queen's Gold Vase on Albert Victor, the Great Yorkshire Stakes on Dalnacardoch, and six wins on Cantiniere.

Two more Classics were still to come - the 1873 2,000 Guineas on Gang Forward and the 1875 St Leger on Craig Millar, but over the rest of the 1870s his win record progressively tailed off, until, struggling to reach riding weight, he retired.

== Later life ==
Chaloner was "a reliable and unassuming man" and from his racing earnings bought a pub for his parents.

After retiring from riding, Chaloner began a training career, but shortly after taking it up, his health began to fail. He did have one major success - trained the 1884 2,000 Guineas winner, Scot Free.

Chaloner died at Osborne House on 3 April 1886, aged 46,/ not known although some sources give his age at death as 47. He left an estate worth £799 1s. 6d.

His wife Ellen retained her husband's training license – an unusual occurrence for the times - and continued to ride out until well into her nineties, dying on 5 March 1944. She is buried in St Agnes Church, Newmarket.

Their son, Tom Chaloner Jr, won the 1895 Cambridgeshire Handicap, dedicating it to the memory of his father, and became a trainer at Newmarket. Two other brothers - Philip Arrowsmith and George - also became trainers, while another brother Richard became a jumps jockey. George had also briefly been a jockey, but had to give it up due to problems with his weight.

== Riding style ==
Chaloner had a peculiarity in his seat when he rode, but was still considered the "beau ideal" of a jockey, "combining coolness with consummate ability". He was a great judge of pace, and very patient.

== Major wins ==
(United Kingdom) Great Britain

- 2,000 Guineas Stakes - (2) - Macaroni (1863), Moslem (dead heat, 1868), Gang Forward (1873)
- Epsom Derby - Macaroni (1863)
- Epsom Oaks - Feu de Joie (1862)
- St Leger - (5) - Caller Ou (1861), The Marquis (1862), Achievement (1867), Formosa (1868), Craig Millar (1875)

== Statistics by year ==
- pre-1869 - not known
- 1870 - 46 / 194
- 1871 - 41 / not known
- 1872 - 29 / not known
- 1873 - 20 / 136
- 1874 - 24 / not known
- 1875 - not known
- 1876 - 28 / not known
- 1877 - 16 / not known
- 1878 - 13 / not known
- 1879 - 6 / not known

== Bibliography ==
- Tanner, Michael; Cranham, Gerry (1992). Great Jockeys of the Flat. Enfield, Middlesex: Guinness Publishing. ISBN 0-85112-989-7.
