= Achievement (horse) =

British Thoroughbred racehorse

- From Portraits of Celebrated Racehorses of the Past and Present Centuries, vol.4 (1888)
- Sire: Stockwell
- Dam: Paradigm
- Sex: Mare
- Foaled: 1864
- Country: United Kingdom of Great Britain and Ireland
- Colour: Brown
- Breeder: Mark Pearson
- Owner: Mark Pearson
- Trainer: James Dover
- Record: 23:16-6-1
- Earnings: £22,442

Major wins
- Woodcote Stakes (1866); New Stakes (1866); July Stakes (1866); Champagne Stakes (1866); 1000 Guineas (1867); Coronation Stakes (1867); St Leger (1867); Doncaster Cup (1867)

Achievement (1864–1872) was a British Thoroughbred racehorse and broodmare. In a career that lasted from April 1866 to June 1868 she ran twenty-three times and won sixteen races. She was arguably the best British two-year-old of either sex in 1866 when she won eleven times and was only beaten when attempting to concede weight to colts. As a three-year-old she won the Classic 1000 Guineas at Newmarket and then returned from a surprising defeat in The Oaks to beat The Derby winner Hermit in the St Leger at Doncaster. After failing to show her best form in 1868 she was retired to stud and died four years later.

== Background ==
Achievement was a strikingly attractive dark brown filly standing 15.3 hands high. She was foaled in 1864 at Oakley Hall, the stud farm of Colonel (later General) Mark Pearson which was located twenty miles outside of Oakham in Northamptonshire. She was sired by Stockwell, winner of the 1852 St. Leger and 2,000 Guineas Stakes and a seven time leading sire. Achievement's dam, Paradigm, was not "fashionably bred" being sired by Paragone, a "3-guinea" sire noted more for producing hunt horses than racehorses. Paradigm's dam, Ellen Horne, was purchased by Pearson for around 18 guineas for his wife to use as a hack horse. Paradigm was an unsuccessful racehorse, running only twice and placing in the Lavender Stakes as a two-year-old before injury forced her retirement from racing. Like her dam, Paradigm was also used as a hack before she entered the stud. Paradigm was later heralded as a worthy broodmare. In 1863, she had produced Achievement's full brother, Lord Lyon, the winner of the 1866 English Triple Crown. Paradigm produced a total of 13 foals and also produced King at Arms, Man at Arms and Blue Mantle.

Pearson sent Achievement to be trained by James Dover at East Ilsley in Berkshire.

== Racing career ==
=== 1866: two-year-old season ===
Achievement made her first appearance in April at Newmarket's Craven meeting when she started at odds of 4/7 for the four furlong Beacon Stakes and won by two lengths. At the Ascot spring meeting she won the Grand Stand Plate by three-quarters of a length over five furlongs. She next ran at the Derby meeting at Epsom where she started joint favourite for the Woodcote Stakes with a colt named Hermit and won by three lengths. At Royal Ascot in June, Achievement won the Triennial Stakes, beating the future 2000 Guineas winner Vauban by a length and a half and then took New Stakes, the race now known as the Norfolk Stakes by three lengths. In these races she was ridden by Harry Custance, who became her regular jockey. She ran twice at Newmarket's July meeting, winning the July Stakes and the Chesterfield Stakes before adding the Lavant Stakes at Goodwood later in the month.

In September she took her unbeaten run to nine when winning the Champagne Stakes at Doncaster before being sent to Newmarket for the autumn meetings. At the first October meeting she started at 1/10 and won the Hopeful Stakes by three lengths. At the next meeting Achievement lost her unbeaten record when she failed by a head to concede four pounds to a colt name Plaudit in the Clearwell Stakes and then finished second to The Rake in the inaugural running of the Middle Park Stakes. On the final start of the year at the Houghton meeting she won the Criterion Stakes, beating Friponnier by two lengths. She ended the season with eleven wins and two seconds in thirteen races and £10,387 in prize money Her two defeats were ascribed to either a lack of stamina or to respiratory problems, and there were some claims that she was a roarer.

=== 1867: three-year-old season ===
On her first appearance as a three-year-old, Achievement started at odds of 1/8 against six fillies in the 1000 Guineas at Newmarket on 25 April. Ridden by Harry Custance, she won easily ("in a hand canter") by three lengths from Soeur de Charite.

At Epsom, Achievement started 1/3 favourite for the Oaks in a field of eight on a cold and cloudy day. Before the race she looked particularly fit ("trained to a hair, with a coat like satin") and settled well in the early stages behind a very slow pace. After appearing to have every chance in the straight and briefly taking the lead she weakened in the closing stages before dead-heating for second place with Romping Girl, a length behind Hippia. Her performance renewed suspicions raised after her previous defeats that she had problems with her "pipes", while other explanations included over-training and an inability to cope with an uphill finish. At Royal Ascot in June she won the one mile Coronation Stakes by eight lengths from Arapeile, but on the following afternoon she was beaten three lengths by Vauban in the Triennial Stakes. In August she was sent to York where she ran against colts, including Vauban, in the Great Yorkshire Stakes over one mile six furlongs. Achievement, whose stamina had been doubted, started second favourite of the four runners but ran "like a giantess refreshed" and won by ten lengths from Vauban, with the other runners being pulled up and failing to complete the course.

In September, Achievement was sent to Doncaster where she was entered in both the St Leger and the Doncaster Cup. In the St Leger on 11 September she was made 15/8 second choice in the betting, with Hermit starting the 6/5 favourite. Achievement was impressive in the parade before the race, looking bigger and stronger than she had done earlier in the season. Ridden by Tom Challoner she took the lead in the straight and held off challenges from Hermit and Julius to win by a length. Two days after her win in the St Leger, Achievement faced Hermit again in the Doncaster Cup over two miles five furlongs and won by three quarters of a length.

=== 1868: four-year-old season ===
Achievement returned to race as a four-year-old, but failed to reproduce her best form, failing to win in three starts. On 19 May she finished second, beaten at fifteen lengths by Julius in the Beaufort Cup at Bath and at Ascot in June she finished second to Mandrake in the Triennial Stakes. On her final appearance, she finished third of the five runners behind Knight of the Garter in the Stockbridge Cup over seven furlongs on 24 June.

== Assessment ==
In May 1886 The Sporting Times carried out a poll of one hundred racing experts to create a ranking of the best British racehorses of the 19th century. Achievement was ranked in the top ten by nine of the contributors, placing her twenty-seventh among all horses and making her the sixth highest-rated filly or mare behind Virago, Plaisanterie, Crucifix, Blink Bonny and Wheel of Fortune.

== Stud career ==
Achievement made no impact as a broodmare. Two of her three pregnancies resulted in dead foals, and her only live offspring was a colt by Gladiateur who did not race. Achievement died at the age of eight in 1872 of a ruptured intestine.

== Pedigree ==
Pedigree of Achievement (GB), bay mare 1864
Sire Stockwell Chestnut 1849	The Baron; Ch. 1842	Birdcatcher	Sir Hercules
Sire Stockwell Chestnut 1849	The Baron; Ch. 1842	Birdcatcher	Guiccioli
Sire Stockwell Chestnut 1849	The Baron; Ch. 1842	Echidna	Economist
Sire Stockwell Chestnut 1849	The Baron; Ch. 1842	Echidna	Miss Pratt
Sire Stockwell Chestnut 1849	Pocahontas; Bay 1837	Glencoe	Sultan
Sire Stockwell Chestnut 1849	Pocahontas; Bay 1837	Glencoe	Trampoline
Sire Stockwell Chestnut 1849	Pocahontas; Bay 1837	Marpessa	Muley
Sire Stockwell Chestnut 1849	Pocahontas; Bay 1837	Marpessa	Clare
Dam Paradigm Bay 1853	Paragone; 1843	Touchstone	Camel
Dam Paradigm Bay 1853	Paragone; 1843	Touchstone	Banter
Dam Paradigm Bay 1853	Paragone; 1843	Hoyden	Tomboy
Dam Paradigm Bay 1853	Paragone; 1843	Hoyden	Rocbana
Dam Paradigm Bay 1853	Ellen Horne; 1844	Redshank	Sandbeck
Dam Paradigm Bay 1853	Ellen Horne; 1844	Redshank	Johanna
Dam Paradigm Bay 1853	Ellen Horne; 1844	Delhi	Plenipotentiary
Dam Paradigm Bay 1853	Ellen Horne; 1844	Delhi	Pawn Junior (Family 1-j)
