= Cremorne (horse) =

British-bred Thoroughbred racehorse

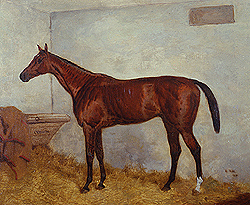
- Cremorne in 1872. Painting by Harry Hall
- Sire: Parmesan
- Grandsire: Sweetmeat
- Dam: Rigolboche
- Damsire: Rataplan
- Sex: Stallion
- Foaled: 1869
- Country: United Kingdom of Great Britain and Ireland
- Colour: Bay
- Breeder: Henry Savile
- Owner: Henry Savile
- Trainer: William Gilbert
- Record: 19 won

Major wins
- Woodcote Stakes (1871); Champagne Stakes (1871); Newmarket Stakes (1872); Epsom Derby (1872); Grand Prix de Paris (1872); Ascot Triennial Stakes (1872); Ascot Gold Cup (1873); Alexandra Plate (1873)

Cremorne (1869–1883) was a British Thoroughbred racehorse and sire. In a career that lasted from 1871 to 1873 he ran twenty-five times and won nineteen races. He was one of the leading British two-year-olds of 1870, when he won nine of his eleven starts. In the summer of 1872 he became the second of six horses to win both The Derby and the Grand Prix de Paris. At the end of the 1873 season, in which he won the Ascot Gold Cup, he was retired to stud, where he was moderately successful. He died in 1881. Cremorne was regarded by contemporary authorities as one of the best horses of his era in England.

== Background ==
Cremorne, described by The Field as "low, lengthy... wiry and muscular" horse with a strong and smooth action, was bred by his owner, Henry Savile at Rufford Abbey in Nottinghamshire. He was sired by Parmesan, a male-line descendant of the Byerley Turk. Parmesan won the Gold Vase at Royal Ascot and became a highly successful stallion siring, in addition to Cremorne, the 1871 Derby winner Favonius. Cremorne's dam, Rigolboche, was unraced. Savile sent the colt to his private trainer, William Gilbert at the Nunnery stable at Newmarket, Suffolk.

Cremorne was a difficult horse to train, owing to his extreme laziness: he was known to fall asleep during breaks in exercise. He also had an apparently insatiable appetite and would eat anything edible within his range. On one occasion he contracted a near-fatal bout of colic after eating all of his bedding straw.

== Racing career ==
=== 1871: two-year-old season ===
Cremorne was one of the leading colts of his generation as a two-year-old, winning nine times. His wins included the Woodcote Stakes at Epsom, the Hurstbourne Stakes at Stockbridge, two races at Ascot (one of which was a "walk over" as no horse opposed him), the Chesterfield Stakes at Newmarket and the Champagne Stakes at Doncaster. By August he was being described as the "crack two-year-old of the season".

He was beaten twice. At York he won the North of England Biennial Stakes but was beaten in a Prince of Wales's Stakes when attempting to win a second race later the same day. Following his attack of colic in autumn, he finished third to Prince Charlie in the Criterion Stakes at Newmarket in October, although he won a Two-Year-Old Plate at the same meeting.

At the end of the season, Cremorne was joint-favourite with Laburnum for the following year's Derby.

=== 1872: three-year-old season ===
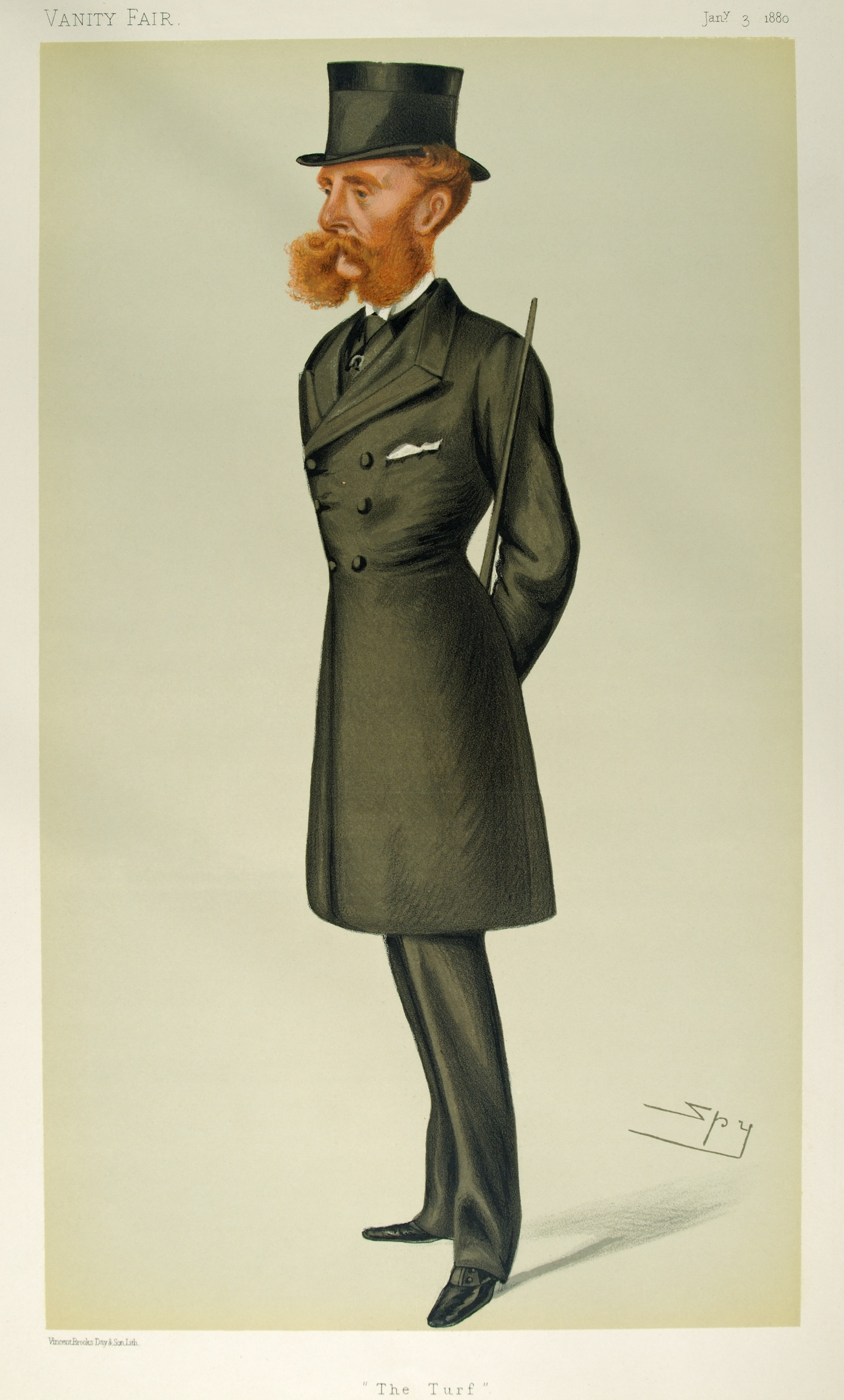
Henry Savile, who owned and bred Cremorne

Cremorne made his first appearance of the season in the 2000 Guineas at Newmarket on 1 May. He finished second of the fourteen runners behind Prince Charlie. Two weeks later he walked over in the Newmarket Stakes.

At Epsom on 29 May, Cremorne started 3/1 second favourite for the Derby behind Prince Charlie (5/2) in a field of twenty-three runners. The race was run in brilliant weather and attracted an unusually large crowd. Ridden by Charles Maidment, Cremorne tracked the leaders before being moved up to third place and then challenging for the lead just before the final turn. Entering the straight, Maidment sent the colt to the front from the early leader Westland as Prince Charlie, having briefly looked a danger, dropped away beaten. Cremorne went clear, but a challenger emerged in the form of an unnamed colt known as "the brother to Flurry" (later named Pell Mell), and the two colts raced together throughout the closing stages, with Cremorne prevailing by a head.

Immediately after the Derby, Cremorne was sent to France for the Grand Prix de Paris at Longchamp. The 3000m race on 9 June carried a prize of £6,000, making it the most valuable in France and the subject of intense nationalistic rivalry. Cremorne took the lead at the start of the straight and won easily from The Oaks winner Reine, with the Prix du Jockey Club winner Revigny only fifth. Cremorne's win provoked a hostile reaction among the spectators and he was hurried out of the country at the earliest available opportunity. Henry Savile marked the win by donating 5000 francs to "the poor of Paris". On his return to England Cremorne was sent straight to Ascot for the Royal meeting. He was entered in two races on the opening day of the meeting and won both, taking a Biennial Stakes and walking over in the Triennial Stakes. In August, Cremorne was sent to York where he won the Great Yorkshire Stakes and walked over in the North of England Biennial Stakes.

Cremorne had never been entered in the St Leger and in autumn he was sent to Newmarket. He won the Newmarket Derby but was beaten in the Newmarket St Leger when attempting to give fourteen pounds to Laburnum.

Cremorne's earnings of £7,650 (not including the Grand Prix) were the highest for any British-trained horse that season and helped his sire Parmesan to third place in the list of leading sires

=== 1873: four-year-old season ===
On his four-year-old debut Cremorne finished second in the City and Suburban Handicap at Epsom in April, when he carried top weight of 128 pounds. In June Cremorne returned to Royal Ascot where he walked over in the Triennial Stakes before running in the two and a half mile Ascot Gold Cup. Opposed by a strong field, Cremorne took the lead half a mile from the finish and drew away to win easily by eight lengths from Flageolet, with Revigny and the Fillies' Triple Crown winner Hannah among those further back. Later in the meeting he won the Alexandra Plate over three miles by fifteen lengths.

Soon after his runs at Ascot, Cremorne "sprang a curb" (became lame owing to a swollen hock). He was nevertheless entered in the Goodwood Cup in July, where he cantered round well behind the other two runners and walked over the line to finish tailed off in third place. He "ran" in the race purely to win a bet with a bookmaker who had offered long odds against him completing the course.

== Assessment ==
In May 1886 The Sporting Times carried out a poll of one hundred racing experts to create a ranking of the best British racehorses of the 19th century. Cremorne was ranked eleventh, having been placed in the top ten by thirty of the contributors. He was the highest-placed Derby winner of the 1870s and the second highest British horse of his decade behind Isonomy.

== Stud career ==
Cremorne was retired to his owner's stud. When Henry Savile died, the horse was put up for sale and bought for £5,400 guineas by A. S. Lumley, a member of Savile's family. Cremorne's best progeny were the Grand Prix de Paris winner Thurio and the filly Kermesse, who was the leading British two-year-old of 1880. He also sired the 1884 Grand National winner Voluptuary. Without regular exercise and allowed to indulge his appetite for food, Cremorne became grossly overweight and died of "rupture of the heart" in January 1883. He was buried at Rufford Abbey, where his gravestone can still be seen.

== Sire line tree ==
- Cremorne
  - Thurio
  - Voluptuary
  - St George
    - Woodson
      - Red Bud

== Pedigree ==
Pedigree of Cremorne (GB), bay stallion, 1869
Sire Parmesan (GB) 1857	Sweetmeat; 1842	Gladiator	Partisan
Sire Parmesan (GB) 1857	Sweetmeat; 1842	Gladiator	Pauline
Sire Parmesan (GB) 1857	Sweetmeat; 1842	Lollypop	Voltaire
Sire Parmesan (GB) 1857	Sweetmeat; 1842	Lollypop	Belinda
Sire Parmesan (GB) 1857	Gruyere; 1851	Verulam	Lottery
Sire Parmesan (GB) 1857	Gruyere; 1851	Verulam	Wire
Sire Parmesan (GB) 1857	Gruyere; 1851	Jennala	Touchstone
Sire Parmesan (GB) 1857	Gruyere; 1851	Jennala	Emma
Dam Rigolboche (GB) 1861	Rataplan; 1850	The Baron	Birdcatcher
Dam Rigolboche (GB) 1861	Rataplan; 1850	The Baron	Echidna
Dam Rigolboche (GB) 1861	Rataplan; 1850	Pocahontas	Glencoe
Dam Rigolboche (GB) 1861	Rataplan; 1850	Pocahontas	Marpessa
Dam Rigolboche (GB) 1861	Gardham mare 1845	Gardham	Falcon
Dam Rigolboche (GB) 1861	Gardham mare 1845	Gardham	Muta
Dam Rigolboche (GB) 1861	Gardham mare 1845	Langar mare	Langar
Dam Rigolboche (GB) 1861	Gardham mare 1845	Langar mare	Clinker mare(Family: 2-n)
