= Voluptuary =

British Thoroughbred racehorse

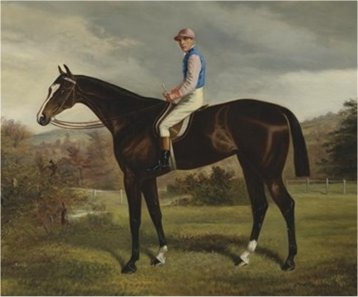
- The Grand National winner Voluptuary with Edward P. Wilson up by Benjamin Cam Norton, c. 1884.
- Sire: Cremorne
- Grandsire: Parmesan
- Dam: Miss Evelyn
- Damsire: Orlando
- Sex: Gelding
- Foaled: 1878
- Country: United Kingdom
- Colour: Bay
- Breeder: Queen Victoria
- Owner: 1) Lord Rosebery (1879–1883); 2) H. F. Boyd (1883–1889); 3) Sir Augustus Harris
- Trainer: Edward P. Wilson (steeple-chasing)
- Record: 4: 3-0-1
- Earnings: £2,195 (flat-racing)

Major wins
- Nursery Plate (1880); Leicester Christmas Handicap Hurdle (1883); Grand National (1884)

Voluptuary (1878 – September 1902) was a Thoroughbred race horse that won the 1884 Grand National. He had a varied racing career, competing in flat racing before becoming the first horse to win a Grand National without competing in a previous year. He was also the first National winner that had also run in the Epsom Derby. After Voluptuary retired from racing, he received critical acclaim for portraying the racehorse "The Duke" in the play The Prodigal Daughter, which included an on-stage reenactment of a Grand National-type water obstacle.

== Background ==
Voluptuary was foaled in 1878 at the Hampton Court Stud, the royal stud farm belonging to Queen Victoria, in East Molesey. His sire, Cremorne, was a multiple stakes winner that completed over varied distances, winning the 1872 Epsom Derby, Grand Prix de Paris and the 1873 Ascot Gold Cup. Voluptuary's dam, Miss Evelyn (1866 – 1891), was sired by the 1844 Derby winner Orlando, but did not have a successful racing career. Voluptuary was her ninth and most notable foal, although her sons Hampton Court and Bend Or II were used as breeding stallions despite never racing. A full-sister to Miss Evelyn, Julie, produced the Royal Hunt Cup and City and Suburban Handicap winner Julius Caesar.

Voluptuary was sold as a yearling in 1879 to Lord Rosebery for 660 guineas. It was the highest price received for a yearling at the Hampton Court sale, as the majority of the offerings were described as having "wretched character" and turnout for the sale was low due to a torrential rainstorm and the stud manager offering "undrinkable" champagne. Initially named Battersea, his name was changed to Voluptuary before racing in 1880.

== Racing career ==
Voluptuary raced until he was 14 years old, first in flat racing until he was five and sporadically thereafter in steeplechase races. He raced as an entire horse from 1880 to 1882, but was gelded after his four-year-old season.

=== Flat racing ===
==== 1880–1881: two and three-year-old seasons ====
Voluptuary first raced as a two-year-old in September 1880, winning the Nursery Plate at Sandown Park. He was third in the Woodcote Stakes. Voluptuary won the St. George Stakes on 12 July at the Liverpool meeting, beating the colts Ishmael and Bosquet by a margin of three-quarters of a length. He was unplaced in the Sussex Stakes run at Goodwood.

==== 1882–1883: four and five-year-old seasons ====
In his only appearance on the turf in 1883, Voluptuary was unplaced for the Beaufort Stakes run in July at Newmarket. He was sold to H. Boyd for 150 guineas in October 1883 at the dispersal sale of Lord Rosebery's bloodstock. Finishing the year, he won the Leicester Christmas Handicap Hurdle in December by a margin of 3/4 length.

== Acting career ==
He was still starring The Prodigal Daughter in November 1898. By July 1900, Voluptuary had moved to the Lyric Theater, where "The Prodigal Daughter" continued under the new management of Henry C. Arnold. Voluptuary was still performing in a Bradford rendition of the play when he died in September 1902.

== Tabulated pedigree ==
Pedigree of Voluptuary (GB), Bay Gelding, 1878
Sire Cremorne (GB) 1869	Parmesan; Brown, 1857	Sweetmeat	Gladiator
Sire Cremorne (GB) 1869	Parmesan; Brown, 1857	Sweetmeat	Lollypop
Sire Cremorne (GB) 1869	Parmesan; Brown, 1857	Gruyere	Verulam
Sire Cremorne (GB) 1869	Parmesan; Brown, 1857	Gruyere	Jennala
Sire Cremorne (GB) 1869	Rigolboche; Chestnut, 1861	Rataplan	The Baron
Sire Cremorne (GB) 1869	Rigolboche; Chestnut, 1861	Rataplan	Pocahontas
Sire Cremorne (GB) 1869	Rigolboche; Chestnut, 1861	Gardham mare	Gardham
Sire Cremorne (GB) 1869	Rigolboche; Chestnut, 1861	Gardham mare	Langar mare
Dam Miss Evelyn (GB) Bay, 1866	Orlando; Bay, 1841	Touchstone	Camel
Dam Miss Evelyn (GB) Bay, 1866	Orlando; Bay, 1841	Touchstone	Banter
Dam Miss Evelyn (GB) Bay, 1866	Orlando; Bay, 1841	Vulture	Langar
Dam Miss Evelyn (GB) Bay, 1866	Orlando; Bay, 1841	Vulture	Kite
Dam Miss Evelyn (GB) Bay, 1866	Nun Appleton; Bay, 1845	Bay Middleton	Sultan
Dam Miss Evelyn (GB) Bay, 1866	Nun Appleton; Bay, 1845	Bay Middleton	Cobweb
Dam Miss Evelyn (GB) Bay, 1866	Nun Appleton; Bay, 1845	Miss Milner	Malek
Dam Miss Evelyn (GB) Bay, 1866	Nun Appleton; Bay, 1845	Miss Milner	Whisker mare (Family 20)
