= Favonius (horse) =

British-bred Thoroughbred racehorse

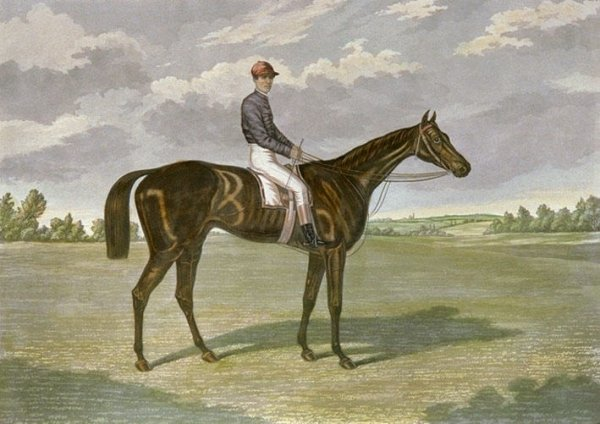
- Engraving of Favonius
- Sire: Parmesan
- Grandsire: Sweetmeat
- Dam: Zephyr
- Damsire: King Tom
- Sex: Stallion
- Foaled: 1868
- Died: 1877 (aged 8–9)
- Country: United Kingdom of Great Britain and Ireland
- Colour: Chestnut
- Owner: Meyer de Rothschild
- Trainer: Joseph Hayhoe
- Record: 11: 5-4-0
- Earnings: £

Major wins
- Epsom Derby (1871); Goodwood Cup (1872)

Favonius (1868–1877) was a British Thoroughbred racehorse and sire. In a career that lasted from 1871 to 1873, he ran ten times and won five races. In June 1871 he won The Derby on his second racecourse appearance. He went on to prove himself a top class stayer, winning the Goodwood Cup in 1872. Favonius was regarded by contemporary observers as one of the best English-trained horses of his era. At the end of the 1873 season he was retired to stud but had little chance to make an impact as a stallion before his death four years later. Favonius’s Derby win was one of the highlights of what became known as “The Baron’s Year”, in which his owner, Baron Meyer de Rothschild won four of the five British Classic Races.

== Background ==
Favonius was bred by his owner, Baron Meyer de Rothschild. He was sired by Parmesan, a male-line descendant of the Byerley Turk. Parmesan won the Gold Vase at Royal Ascot and became a highly successful stallion siring, in addition to Favonius, the 1871 Derby winner Cremorne. Favonius’s dam Zephyr, was a full sister to Hannah, who won the Fillies’ Triple Crown in “The Baron’s Year”.

Rothschild sent the colt to his private trainer Joseph Hayhoe at his Palace House stables at Newmarket, Suffolk. Until 1946, British racehorses were allowed to race without being officially named, and until shortly before his Derby win, Favonius was known as “The Zephyr Colt”.

== Racing career ==
=== 1871: three-year-old season ===
The Zephyr Colt was slow to mature and did not race as a two-year-old. He made his debut in the spring of 1871 in a Biennial Stakes at Newmarket. He was beaten a head by Albert Victor. In mid-May Hayhoe tried the colt in a private trial race against Hannah, which convinced him that the colt was sixteen pounds superior to the filly.

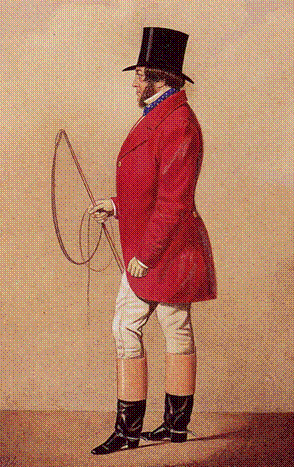
Baron Meyer de Rothschild

In the Derby at Epsom, the newly named colt started at odds of 9/1 in a field of seventeen runners, with Bothwell being made the 2/1 favourite. The appearance of the name "Favonius" on the race card reportedly caused some confusion among racegoers who were unaware that the Baron had decided to name the Zephyr Colt after the personification of the West Wind. The crowd included the Prince of Wales who viewed the race from a private stand near the judge's chair. Ridden by Tom French, Favonius made little show in the early stages, but moved up to track the leaders entering the straight. He made steady progress to take the lead inside the final furlong and won easily by one and a half lengths from Albert Victor and King of the Forest who dead-heated for second place. The win was extremely popular with the huge crowd, and the Baron, identifiable by his white hat was mobbed by wellwishers as he attempted to return to his carriage. Rothschild was reported to have given £1,000 to Tom French for his ride on Favonius, with an additional £200 annuity for life.

In July, Favonius won the Midsummer Stakes at Newmarket. On 27 July he ran in a much anticipated race for the Goodwood Cup in which he has matched against the French-trained Ascot Gold Cup winner Mortemer. Favonius defeated the French horse, but was beaten half a length in a "most sensational race" by the 50/1 outsider Shannon to whom he was conceding ten pounds The very slow pace at which the race was run in the early stages led some commentators to consider the result a "fluke". In the Brighton Cup over two miles, Favonius started 4/6 favourite and won easily by three lengths.

Favonius had not been entered for the St Leger and did not race again until October when he appeared at Newmarket. In the Cambridgeshire Handicap he finished unplaced carrying a weight of 123 pounds. He walked over at Newmarket later in the month, after only rival, Sterling, was withdrawn to pursue a match against the American champion Harry Bassett.

Favonius's winning prize money of £5,900 contributed towards Baron Rothschild being the leading owner of 1871.

=== 1872: four-year-old season ===
In 1872, Favonius was aimed at the major staying races. Early in the year, Rothschild had reportedly turned down an offer of £12,000 for the colt. On his first start of the year he easily defeated Dutch Skater in a two-mile race at Newmarket in May. At Ascot in June he started 2/5 favourite for the Gold Cup in front of a crowd which included the Prince of Wales and many other members of the British aristocracy. He looked impressive in the paddock and took the lead in the straight but was beaten by the French colt Henry. Two days later he ran in the Alexandra Plate over three miles and finished fourth behind Musket

In July he ran in his second Goodwood Cup and produced one of his best performances, taking the lead early in the straight and drawing clear to win by ten lengths from Albert Victor.

=== 1873: five-year-old season ===
In his only race as a five-year-old, Favonius ran in the Goodwood Cup for a third time. He finished second to Flageolet, with Cremorne finishing tailed-off in third.

== Assessment ==
In May 1886 The Sporting Times carried out a poll of one hundred racing experts to create a ranking of the best British racehorses of the 19th century. Favonius was ranked thirty-third, having been placed in the top ten by seven of the contributors. He was the third highest-placed Derby winner of the 1870s and the sixth highest British horse of his decade behind Isonomy.

== Stud career ==
Favonius was retired to his owner’s Mentmore stud. He stood for only four seasons before his death from a form of "Typhoid fever" in August 1877 when he was valued at £12,000. His most notable offspring was Sir Bevys, who won the Derby in 1879.

== Sire line tree ==
- Favonius
  - Favo
    - Primrose League
  - Sir Bevys
    - Aladdin
    - Banter
    - Bevil
    - The Vicar
    - Mountain Knight
    - Country Boy
    - Beaver
    - Theodore
    - The Rector
    - Morglay
    - Chilton Boy
  - Eusebe
    - Le Torpilleur

== Pedigree ==
Pedigree of Favonius (GB), bay stallion, 1868
Sire Parmesan (GB) 1857	Sweetmeat; 1842	Gladiator	Partisan
Sire Parmesan (GB) 1857	Sweetmeat; 1842	Gladiator	Pauline
Sire Parmesan (GB) 1857	Sweetmeat; 1842	Lollypop	Voltaire
Sire Parmesan (GB) 1857	Sweetmeat; 1842	Lollypop	Belinda
Sire Parmesan (GB) 1857	Gruyere; 1851	Verulam	Lottery
Sire Parmesan (GB) 1857	Gruyere; 1851	Verulam	Wire
Sire Parmesan (GB) 1857	Gruyere; 1851	Jennala	Touchstone
Sire Parmesan (GB) 1857	Gruyere; 1851	Jennala	Emma
Dam Zephyr (GB) 1862	King Tom; 1851	Harkaway	Economist
Dam Zephyr (GB) 1862	King Tom; 1851	Harkaway	Fanny Dawson
Dam Zephyr (GB) 1862	King Tom; 1851	Pocahontas	Glencoe
Dam Zephyr (GB) 1862	King Tom; 1851	Pocahontas	Marpessa
Dam Zephyr (GB) 1862	Mentmore Lass; 1850	Melbourne	Humphrey Clinker
Dam Zephyr (GB) 1862	Mentmore Lass; 1850	Melbourne	Cervantes mare
Dam Zephyr (GB) 1862	Mentmore Lass; 1850	Emerald	Defence
Dam Zephyr (GB) 1862	Mentmore Lass; 1850	Emerald	Emiliana (Family: 3-c)
