= 1878 Grand National =

English steeplechase horse race

- Grand National
- Location: Aintree
- Date: 29 March 1878
- Winning horse: Shifnal
- Starting price: 7/1
- Jockey: J. Jones
- Trainer: John Nightingall
- Owner: John Nightingall
- Conditions: Good to soft

The 1878 Grand National was the 40th renewal of the Grand National horse race that took place at Aintree near Liverpool, England, on 29 March 1878.

== Finishing Order ==
Position	Name	Jockey	Handicap (st-lb)	SP	Distance
01	Shifnal	John Jones	10-12	100-15	2 lengths
02	Martha	Tommy Beasley	10-9	20-1	10 lengths
03	Pride of Kildare	Garrett Moore	11-7	6-1	
04	Jackal	James Jewitt	10-12	12-1	
05	Miss Lizzie	William Hunt	10-7	25-1	
06	Curator	Ted Wilson	10-5	50-1	
07	Boyne Water	Jimmy Adams	10-12	5-1	Last to complete

== Non-finishers ==
Fence	Name	Jockey	Handicap (st-lb)	SP	Fate
?	Verity	W. Gregory	10-10	20-1	Fell
01	His Lordship	Robert I'Anson	10-5	9-2	Knocked Over
01	The Bear	Richard Marsh	10-4	100-8	Knocked Over
01	Northfleet	C Lawrence	10-3	100-7	Fell
01	Tattoo	W Canavan	10-3	100-3	Fell
