= Moses (horse) =

British-bred Thoroughbred racehorse

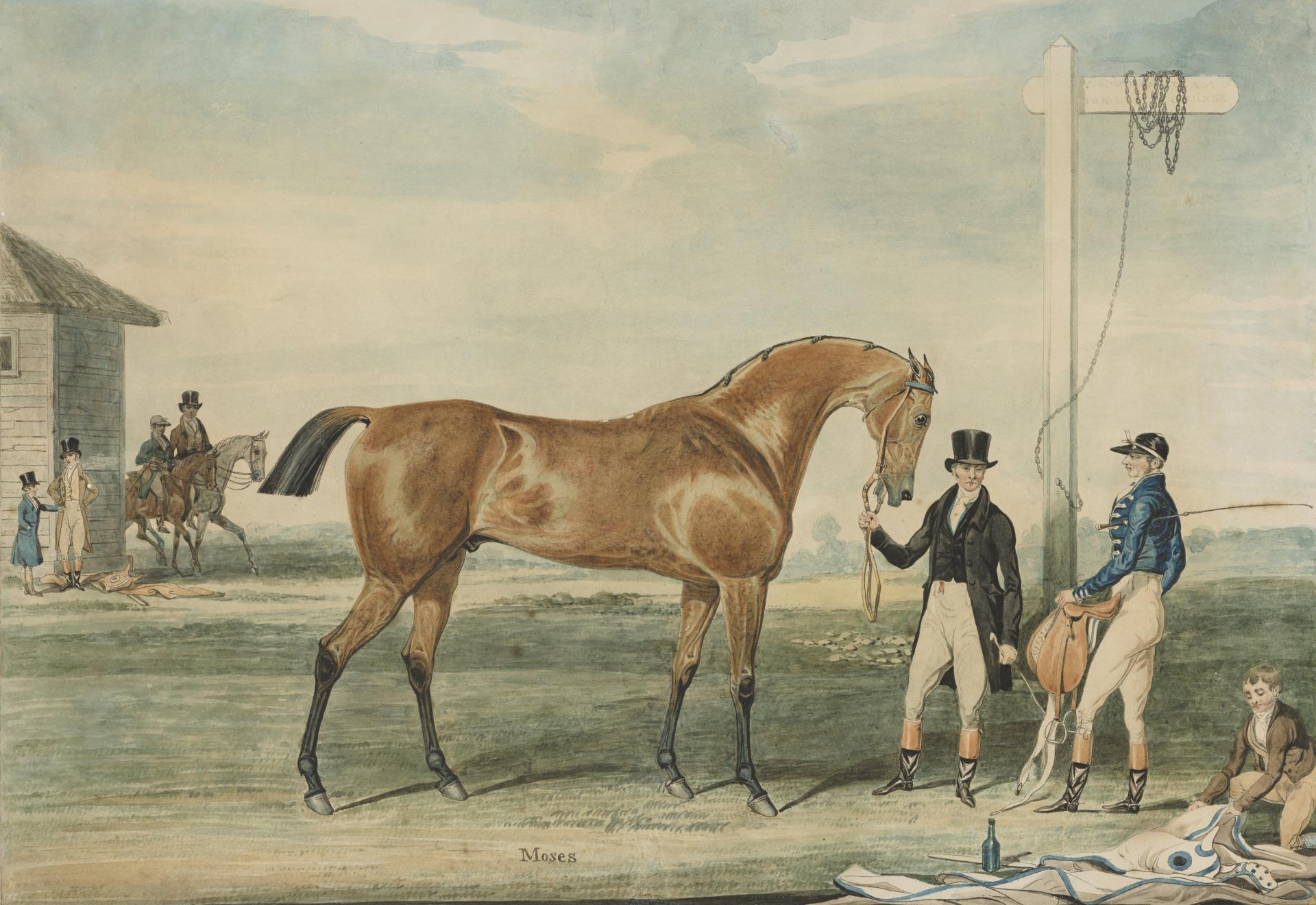
- The Racehorse 'Moses', by James Pollard
- Sire: Seymour or Whalebone
- Grandsire: Delpini
- Dam: Gohanna mare (1807)
- Damsire: Gohanna
- Sex: Stallion
- Foaled: 1819
- Country: United Kingdom of Great Britain and Ireland
- Colour: Bay
- Breeder: Prince Frederick, Duke of York and Albany
- Owner: Prince Frederick, Duke of York and Albany
- Trainer: William Butler
- Record: 5:4-1-0

Major wins
- Epsom Derby (1822); Albany Stakes (1822); Claret Stakes (1823)

Moses (1819–1836) was a British Thoroughbred racehorse and sire. In a career that lasted from April 1822 to May 1823 he ran five times and won four races. In 1822, when three years old, he won all three of his races and became the second of six colts owned by members of the British royal family to win The Derby. His subsequent career was restricted by injuries and he was retired after sustaining his only defeat. He had limited success as a sire of winners and was exported to Germany in 1830.

== Background ==
Moses was bred and owned by the Duke of York, the heir presumptive who raced under the name of his friend "Mr. Greville". The Duke had previously won the Derby in 1816 with Prince Leopold. Moses was foaled at one of the Duke's studs, either at Hampton Court or Oatlands, and was reportedly one of his favourite horses. Both Moses and Prince Leopold were trained by William Butler.

The identity of Moses's father is uncertain. His dam, an unnamed mare by Gohanna, was covered by two stallions, first Whalebone and then Seymour in the spring of 1818. A second covering would usually take place only if the first was thought to have been unsuccessful. The fact that Moses was usually described as being by the former may simply reflect the fact that Whalebone was the much more successful and famous of the two stallions. Whalebone won the 1810 Derby and thirteen other races before becoming a successful and important stallion. He was British Champion sire in 1826 and 1827 and through his son Sir Hercules, is the male-line ancestor of most modern Thoroughbreds. The Gohanna mare went on to produce the filly Rachel, a highly successful racehorse whose wins included the Oatlands Stakes.

== Racing career ==
=== 1822: three-year-old season ===
Moses was unraced as a two-year-old but had acquired enough of a reputation to be regarded as one of the leading contenders for the Derby before the season began. He made his racecourse debut on 23 April 1822 at Newmarket. He was made the 6/4 favourite for a six furlong Sweepstakes and claimed the 200-guinea prize, beating two opponents. Although he won easily, the quality of the beaten horses was questionable.

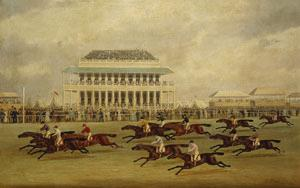
The "desperate" finish of the 1822 Derby

On 23 May at Epsom Moses started 6/1 third favourite in a twelve-runner field for the Derby, with Hampden being made the 3/1 favourite. The early running was made by an outsider named Wanton who led until the turn into the straight but then veered off the course and into the crowd. The closing stages were disputed by Moses, Hamden, Figaro and an unnamed "brother to Antonio". After a "most desperate struggle", Moses, ridden by Thomas Goodisson, won by half a neck from Figaro, with Hampden a length away in third. Wearing the colours of the Duke of York in the race, Moses gave the Duke his second victory, and the third for the royal family, at the Derby. The race was described in a contemporary source as "the best Derby ever run."

Moses reappeared at Ascot on 5 June for the one mile Albany Stakes. Despite carrying a five pounds weight penalty for winning the Derby he started odds on favourite and won "very cleverly" from Stamford. Following this race, Moses began to have training problems, developing "sand-cracks" in his hooves which prevented him from running again in 1822. Moses was scheduled to appear in a match race at Newmarket in October against a four-year-old colt called Black-and-all-black (who was black). He failed to appear for the match, allowing the owners of his opponent to claim the stake money.

=== 1823: four-year-old season ===
Moses maintained his winning run on his four-year-old debut. On 17 April at the Newmarket Craven meeting he defeated five opponents, including the favourite Ajax, to win the Claret Stakes. The race attracted a great deal of interest – it "filled the Town and the heath" – and Goodisson was held to have ridden a particularly fine race on the winner. At the next Newmarket meeting Moses' owners claimed 200 guineas in prize money, when Ajax failed to appear for a scheduled match race.

Three days later, Moses attempted to concede ten pounds to a colt named Macduff in a match race. The Derby winner's unbeaten record came to an end as Macduff won the 200 guinea match over Newmarket's Ditch Mile course. Moses did not appear to be fully fit for this race, and his training problems from the previous year were continuing to affect his performance. He was retired to stud without running again.

== Assessment ==
The Sporting Magazine described Moses as a "trump" and one of the "first-rate horses" of the time.

== Stud career ==
In his first season as a stallion, Moses was based at Bushey Park Paddocks, near Hampton Court. His fee for covering a mare was ten guineas, with a half a guinea for the groom. He may have sired one outstanding racehorse in Albert, a colt who was undefeated in a five-race career that included a win over Cadland in the Audley End Stakes at Newmarket in 1830. Albert's paternity however, was doubtful, as his dam was also covered by a stallion named Waterloo in the year of his conception. According to the General Stud Book, Moses was sold to the Duke of Holstein and exported in 1830. He was sold in November 1836 and died shortly after.

== Pedigree ==
The following pedigree assumes that Moses was sired by Seymour.

Pedigree of Moses (GB), bay stallion, 1819
Sire Seymour(GB) 1807	Delpini; 1781	Highflyer	Herod
Sire Seymour(GB) 1807	Delpini; 1781	Highflyer	Rachel
Sire Seymour(GB) 1807	Delpini; 1781	Countess	Blank
Sire Seymour(GB) 1807	Delpini; 1781	Countess	Rib mare
Sire Seymour(GB) 1807	Bay Javelin; 1793	Javelin	Eclipse
Sire Seymour(GB) 1807	Bay Javelin; 1793	Javelin	Miss Rose
Sire Seymour(GB) 1807	Bay Javelin; 1793	Young Flora	Highflyer
Sire Seymour(GB) 1807	Bay Javelin; 1793	Young Flora	Flora
Dam Gohanna mare (GB) 1807	Gohanna; 1790	Mercury	Eclipse
Dam Gohanna mare (GB) 1807	Gohanna; 1790	Mercury	Tartar mare
Dam Gohanna mare (GB) 1807	Gohanna; 1790	Dundas' Herod mare	Herod
Dam Gohanna mare (GB) 1807	Gohanna; 1790	Dundas' Herod mare	Maiden
Dam Gohanna mare (GB) 1807	Grey Skim; 1793	Woodpecker	Herod
Dam Gohanna mare (GB) 1807	Grey Skim; 1793	Woodpecker	Miss Ramsden
Dam Gohanna mare (GB) 1807	Grey Skim; 1793	Milsinstown's Herod mare	Herod
Dam Gohanna mare (GB) 1807	Grey Skim; 1793	Milsinstown's Herod mare	Young Hag (Family:5-b)
