= Frontier (horse) =

British-bred Thoroughbred racehorse

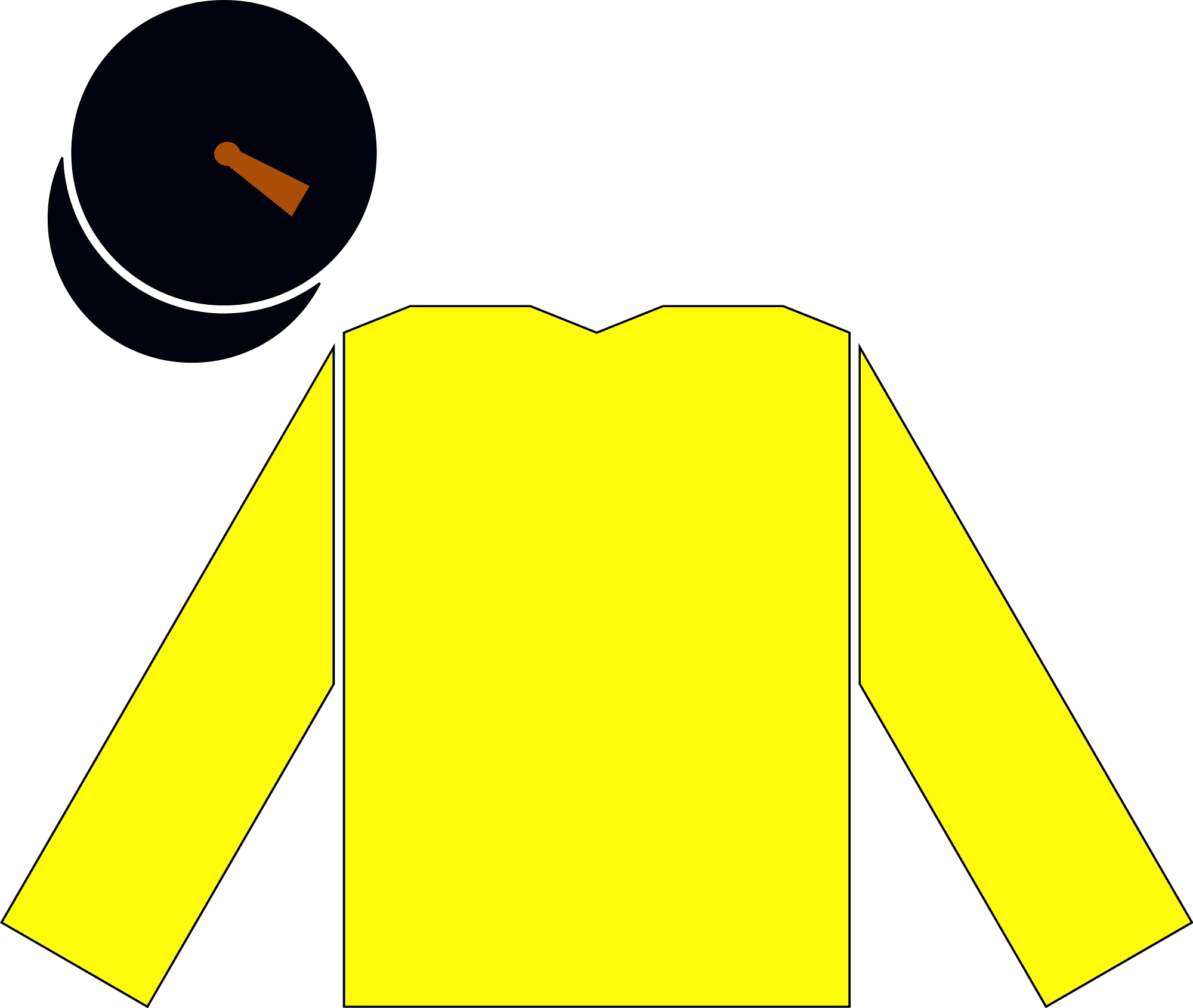
- Racing silks of the Duke of Westminster
- Sire: Orme
- Grandsire: Ormonde
- Dam: Quetta
- Damsire: Bend Or
- Sex: Stallion
- Foaled: 1896
- Country: Great Britain
- Colour: Chestnut
- Breeder: 1st Duke of Westminster
- Owner: 1st Duke of Westminster
- Trainer: John Porter
- Record: 2 wins
- Earnings: £2,717

Major wins
- Dewhurst Plate (1898); Ascot Derby Stakes (1899)

Frontier (foaled 1896) was a British Thoroughbred racehorse who won the Dewhurst Plate as a two-year-old and the Ascot Derby as a three-year-old. He was owned by the Hugh Grosvenor, 1st Duke of Westminster and trained by John Porter at Kingsclere.

== Background ==
Frontier was a chestnut colt bred by the 1st Duke of Westminster and foaled in 1896. He was the son of dual Eclipse Stakes winner Orme, who was Champion sire in Britain in 1899. Amongst Orme's other progeny were Triple Crown winner Flying Fox, Derby winner Orby and 1000 Guineas winner Witch Elm. Frontier's dam was Quetta, a daughter of Bend Or who also produced the City and Suburban Handicap winner Grey Leg and Coronation Stakes winner Helm.

== Racing career ==
As a two-year-old Frontier ran in the National Breeders' Produce Stakes over five furlongs at Sandown. Ridden by Morny Cannon he finished unplaced. He started at the odds of 100/15 for the Dewhurst Plate, again being ridden by Morny Cannon. After the start Frontier was on his own of the far side of the track and as the horses neared the finish he and Caiman, the 11/8 favourite, came away from the field. At the finish Frontier just held on to win by a head from Caiman, with the two clear of Vara in third place.

As a three-year-old at Royal Ascot Frontier ran in the Ascot Derby Stakes. Starting the 6/4 favourite, Cannon sent him to the front as the field of six entered the finishing straight. Non of his rivals could catch him and he went on to win by ¾ length from Jolly Tar. In the Eclipse Stakes at Sandown he faced 2000 Guineas and Epsom Derby winner Flying Fox, who started as the 14/100 favourite. Frontier himself started at 66/1 and finished in second place, a length behind Flying Fox.

== Pedigree ==
Pedigree of Frontier, chestnut stallion, 1896
Sire Orme b. 1889	Ormonde b. 1883	Bend Or* ch. 1877	Doncaster
Sire Orme b. 1889	Ormonde b. 1883	Bend Or* ch. 1877	Rouge Rose
Sire Orme b. 1889	Ormonde b. 1883	Lily Agnes b. 1871	Macaroni
Sire Orme b. 1889	Ormonde b. 1883	Lily Agnes b. 1871	Polly Agnes
Sire Orme b. 1889	Angelica b. 1879	Galopin br. 1872	Vedette
Sire Orme b. 1889	Angelica b. 1879	Galopin br. 1872	Flying Duchess
Sire Orme b. 1889	Angelica b. 1879	St. Angela b. 1865	King Tom
Sire Orme b. 1889	Angelica b. 1879	St. Angela b. 1865	Adeline
Dam Quetta ch. 1885	Bend Or* ch. 1877	Doncaster ch. 1870	Stockwell
Dam Quetta ch. 1885	Bend Or* ch. 1877	Doncaster ch. 1870	Marigold
Dam Quetta ch. 1885	Bend Or* ch. 1877	Rouge Rose ch. 1865	Thormanby
Dam Quetta ch. 1885	Bend Or* ch. 1877	Rouge Rose ch. 1865	Ellen Horne
Dam Quetta ch. 1885	Douranee b. 1877	Rosicrucian b./br. 1865	Beadsman
Dam Quetta ch. 1885	Douranee b. 1877	Rosicrucian b./br. 1865	Madame Eglantine
Dam Quetta ch. 1885	Douranee b. 1877	Fenella ch. 1869	Cambuscan
Dam Quetta ch. 1885	Douranee b. 1877	Fenella ch. 1869	La Favorite

Note: b. = Bay, br. = Brown, ch. = Chestnut

* Frontier was inbred 2x3 to Bend Or. This means that the stallion appears once in the second generation and once in the third generation of his pedigree.
