= Flèche =

Flèche or Fleche may refer to:

- Flèche (architecture), a type of church spire
- Flèche (cycling), a team cycling competition
- Flèche (fencing), an aggressive offensive fencing technique
- Flèche (fortification), a defensive work
- HMS Fleche, ships of the Royal Navy
- French gunboat Flèche (1855)

== See also ==
- Lafleche (disambiguation)
