= Lafleche =

Lafleche or La Fleche (French: La Flèche, The Arrow) may refer to:

- Laflèche (surname), a surname
- La Flèche (chicken), a chicken breed
- La Fleche (horse) (1889–1916), a British Thoroughbred racehorse and broodmare
- La Flèche Wallonne, a cycle road race in Belgium
- Collège Laflèche, a private college in Trois-Rivières, Quebec, Canada
- La Flèche (P32), a vessel of the Seychelles Coast Guard

== Places ==
- La Flèche, a municipality in the department of Sarthe, Pays de la Loire, France
- Lafleche, Saskatchewan, a town in Saskatchewan, Canada
- Laflèche, Quebec, a neighbourhood of Longueuil, Quebec, Canada
- Arrondissement of La Flèche, Pays de la Loire, France

== See also ==
- Flèche (disambiguation)
