= Ajax (horse) =

French-bred Thoroughbred racehorse

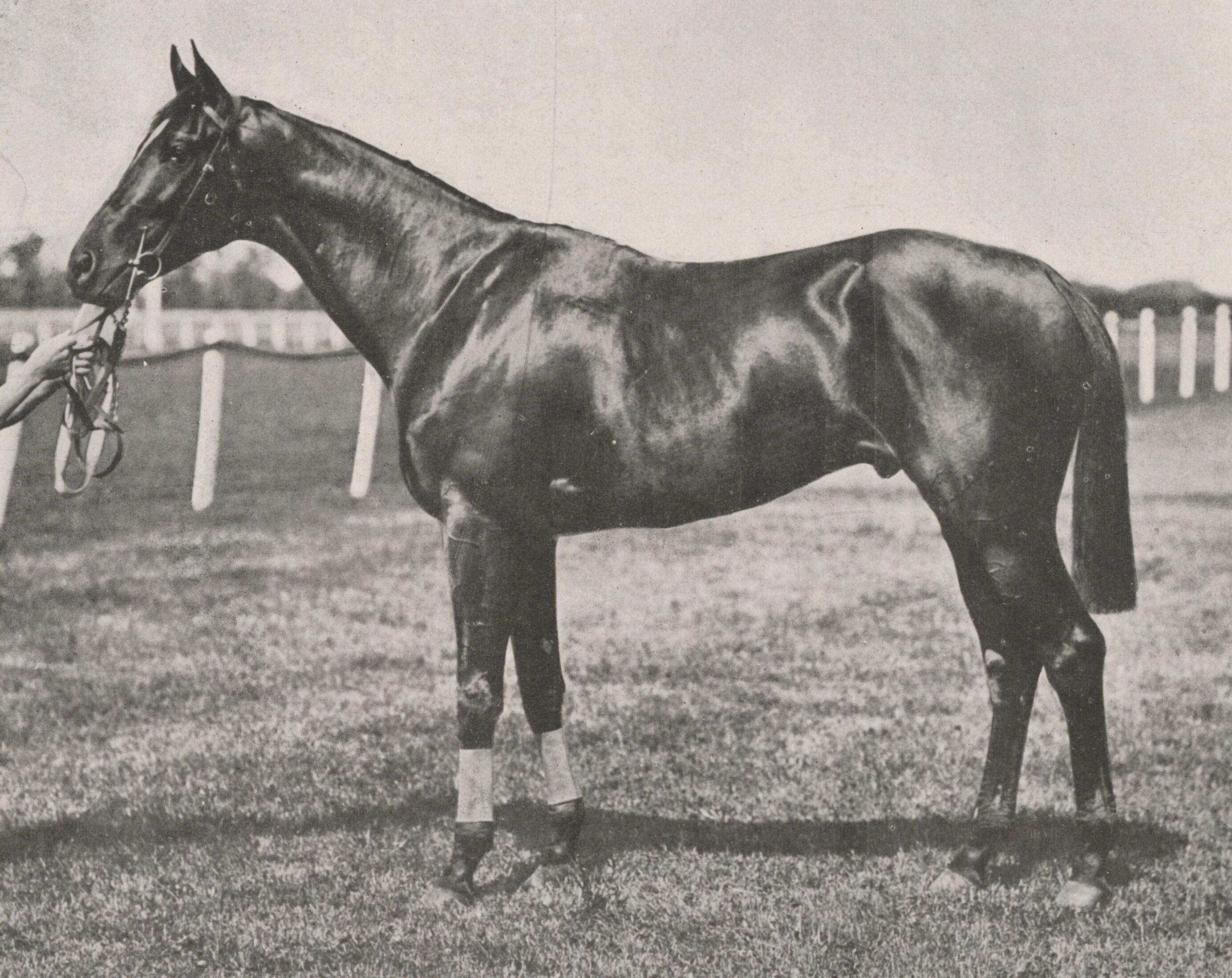
- Sire: Flying Fox (GB)
- Grandsire: Orme
- Dam: Amie
- Damsire: Clamart
- Sex: Stallion
- Foaled: 1901
- Country: France
- Colour: Bay
- Breeder: Edmond Blanc
- Owner: Edmond Blanc
- Trainer: Robert Denman
- Record: 5 starts, 5 wins

Major wins
- Prix Noailles (1904); Prix Lupin (1904); Prix du Jockey Club (1904); Grand Prix de Paris (1904)
- Last updated on 29 January 2011

Ajax (1901 – 15 February 1915) was an undefeated French Thoroughbred racehorse who won the 1904 Prix du Jockey Club and Grand Prix de Paris and was an influential sire.

== Breeding ==
Bred and raced by Edmond Blanc, he was by Flying Fox and out of Amie, whose sire Clamart also won the Grand Prix de Paris. Ajax is a brother to Adam, a sire who was exported to the United States in 1906 and then in 1908 to Austria.

== Racing record ==
Ajax was trained by Robert Denman and ridden by jockey, George Stern. In 1904 the three-year-old colt won the two most prestigious races in France, the Prix du Jockey Club and the Grand Prix de Paris before retiring undefeated after five starts.

At stud, Ajax was an influential stallion who sired Union (his first classic winner and the 3rd dam of Le Pacha) and Teddy. His daughters produced the undefeated Havresac II, Invershin, Massine and Le Correge. Ajax died on 15 February 1915.

== Pedigree ==
Pedigree of Ajax, bay stallion, 1901
Sire Flying Fox b. 1896	Orme b. 1889	Ormonde b. 1883	Bend Or
Sire Flying Fox b. 1896	Orme b. 1889	Ormonde b. 1883	Lily Agnes
Sire Flying Fox b. 1896	Orme b. 1889	Angelica b. 1879	Galopin*
Sire Flying Fox b. 1896	Orme b. 1889	Angelica b. 1879	St.Angela
Sire Flying Fox b. 1896	Vampire br. 1889	Galopin* br. 1872	Vedette
Sire Flying Fox b. 1896	Vampire br. 1889	Galopin* br. 1872	Flying Duchess
Sire Flying Fox b. 1896	Vampire br. 1889	Irony ch. 1881	Rosebery
Sire Flying Fox b. 1896	Vampire br. 1889	Irony ch. 1881	Sarcasm
Dam Amie b. 1893	Clamart ch. 1888	Saumur	Dollar
Dam Amie b. 1893	Clamart ch. 1888	Saumur	Finlande
Dam Amie b. 1893	Clamart ch. 1888	Princess Catherine ch. 1876	Prince Charlie
Dam Amie b. 1893	Clamart ch. 1888	Princess Catherine ch. 1876	Catherine
Dam Amie b. 1893	Alice b./br. 1887	Wellingtonia ch. 1869	Chattanooga
Dam Amie b. 1893	Alice b./br. 1887	Wellingtonia ch. 1869	Araucaria
Dam Amie b. 1893	Alice b./br. 1887	Asta br. 1877	Cambuslang
Dam Amie b. 1893	Alice b./br. 1887	Asta br. 1877	Lady Superior

Note: b. = Bay, br. = Brown, ch. = Chestnut

* Ajax was inbred 3x4 to Galopin. This means that the stallion appears once in the third generation and once in the fourth generation of his pedigree.

== See also ==
- List of leading Thoroughbred racehorses
