= Orme (horse) =

British-bred Thoroughbred racehorse

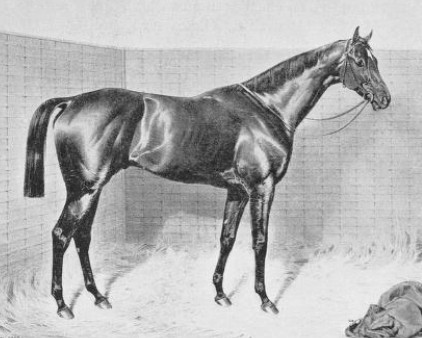
- Painting of Orme by Emil Adam
- Sire: Ormonde
- Grandsire: Bend Or
- Dam: Angelica
- Damsire: Galopin
- Sex: Stallion
- Foaled: 1889
- Country: Great Britain
- Colour: Bay
- Breeder: 1st Duke of Westminster
- Owner: 1st Duke of Westminster
- Trainer: John Porter
- Jockey: George Barrett; Morny Cannon
- Record: 18: 14–3–0
- Earnings: £32,528

Major wins
- Richmond Stakes (1891); Prince of Wales' Stakes (1891); Middle Park Plate (1891); Dewhurst Plate (1891); Eclipse Stakes (1892, 1893); Sussex Stakes (1892); Great Foal Stakes (1892); Champion Stakes (1892); Limekiln Stakes (1892); Rous Memorial Stakes (1893); Gordon Stakes (1893)

Awards
- Leading sire in Great Britain and Ireland (1899)
- Last updated on 31 August 2012

Orme (1889 – 17 September 1915) was a British Thoroughbred racehorse. He was trained at Kingsclere by John Porter for the 1st Duke of Westminster. As a two-year-old he won the Middle Park and Dewhurst Stakes. As a three-year-old he was not well enough to take part in the 2000 Guineas and Epsom Derby, but came back to win the Eclipse Stakes. Orme stayed in training as a four-year-old and won another Eclipse Stakes, becoming the first horse to win the race twice, a feat that has only been repeated four times since. After he had retired from racing, he became a successful sire and was Champion sire of Great Britain in 1899. His son Flying Fox won the Triple Crown and the Eclipse Stakes. Orme also sired Epsom Derby winner Orby and 1000 Guineas winner Witch Elm. His regular jockeys were George Barrett and Morny Cannon.

== Background ==
Orme was a bay colt born in 1889 at Eaton Stud in Cheshire. He was bred by the 1st Duke of Westminster. Orme stood 16 hands high and had a large white star, with no other white markings. His sire was the unbeaten 2000 Guineas, Epsom Derby and St. Leger winner Ormonde. Orme was one of Ormonde's first crop of foals. By the time Orme reached a racecourse, Ormonde had been exported to Argentina. Ormonde did not become a great sire due to fertility problems, producing only a few foals most years. However, he did also sire Goldfinch, a horse that was a top class two-year-old and won the New Stakes. In the United States, he sired Futurity Stakes winner Ormondale. Orme was clear-winded, unlike his sire, who was a roarer.

Orme's dam Angelica was an unraced sister to the outstanding sire St. Simon. They were progeny of Galopin and St. Angela, a daughter of King Tom. The Duke of Westminster had purchased Angelica in 1886 when she was carrying a foal by Coeruleus. The foal was Blue Green, who went on to win the Queen Alexandra Stakes. Orme was Angelica's fifth foal.

Orme showed great promise as a yearling, with trainer John Porter saying he had great expectations for him after only having him for a few months. In October 1890 Orme and Orville were described as "[t]he two finest yearlings in the Duke of Westminster's stud."

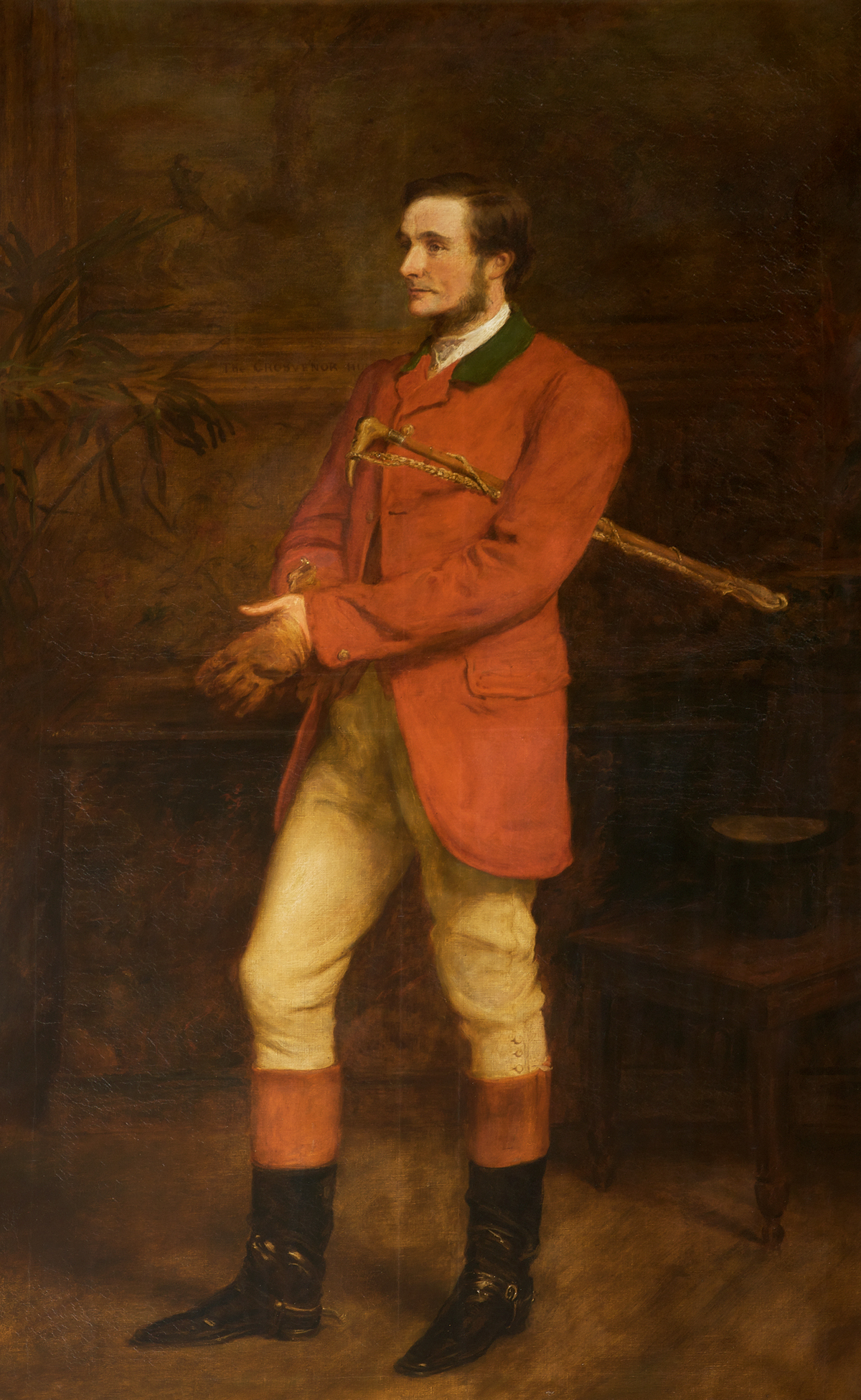
Hugh Grosvenor (1st Duke of Westminster), the owner of Orme

== Racing career ==
=== 1891: Two-year-old season ===
Prior to Orme's first appearance on a racecourse, John Porter tested him over five furlongs against the three-year-old Massacre and three two-year-olds, including Orville. Ridden by George Barrett, Orme won the trial by half a length from Massacre.

==== Early career ====
Orme started his racing career in August 1891 at the Glorious Goodwood meeting at Goodwood Racecourse. He was ridden by George Barrett and started the 4/5 favourite in the Richmond Stakes. 20/1 outsider Ben Avon led the field of eight in the early stages of the race, with Orme in the middle of the pack. Orme took the lead with a quarter of a mile left to run, and despite showing his inexperience, he won easily by three quarters of a length from Flyaway (who was carrying more weight than Orme), the two then colliding as they pulled up. At the same meeting, two days later, Orme also started in the Prince of Wales' Stakes. He started as the 1/2 favourite and led the field from the start. Dunure made some progress from the back of the field into second place, but none of the runners could get to Orme, who won by one length. Dunure was second and Galeopsis was third, four lengths behind Dunure. After these two races, he was already as short as 5/1 for the 1892 Epsom Derby. After Goodwood the Duke of Westminster refused a big offer to purchase Orme.

Orme then took on older horses in the valuable Lancashire Plate, where he started the 7/4 favourite. In the last few furlongs Orme challenged the four-year-old Signorina for the lead, and as they approached the main stand, Martagon challenged the pair. Orme drew level with Signorina, but the filly edged away slightly again and won an exciting race by half a length from Orme, Martagon a head back in third. Orme received £1000 for finishing second.

==== October ====
He returned to racing against horses of his own age, starting the 8/15 favourite of a field of ten runners for the six-furlong Middle Park Plate at Newmarket. As the field neared the finish, Orme was travelling the best, and as soon as Barrett let him go, he immediately took the lead. El Diablo tried to close, but could not get to Orme, with the latter winning easily by a couple of lengths, Gantlet being a neck back from El Diablo in third. Orme then started in the Dewhurst Plate, but his presence deterred many owners from entering and he faced only two rivals. He started as the 6/100 favourite, with El Diablo at 20/1 and Hatfield at 50/1. Orme led from the start, and with two furlongs to run he began to stride away. El Diablo tried to close, but Orme won by three-quarters of a length from him and was never extended. Hatfield finished well behind Orme and El Diablo in third place. Orme's final race of the season came on 30 October in the Home-bred Foal Post Stakes over five furlongs and 140 yards at Newmarket. He started as the 3/100 favourite and faced three rivals. Orme lead throughout the race and won easily by two lengths from Esmond, with Lucellum a further three lengths back in third place.

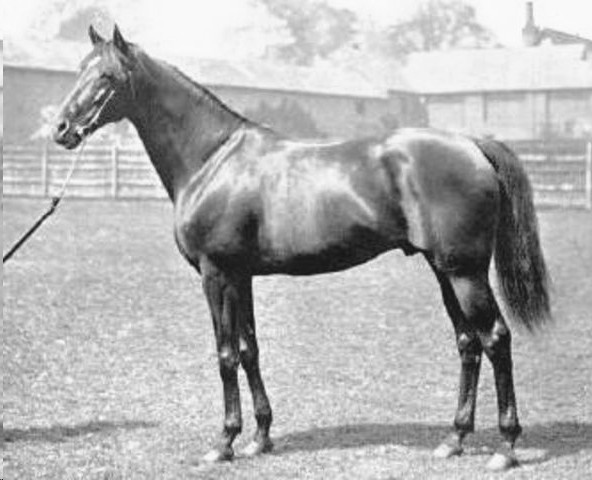
Photo of Orme

He finished his two-year-old season with a record of five wins and a second place from six starts. At the end of the season, some even believed that he was better than his sire Ormonde, the 'horse of the century'. One writer rated him ten pounds superior to the next best two-year-old La Fleche, with her being one pound superior to Flyaway. Some were more cautious, however, suggesting that Orme had not beaten any top horses.

=== 1892: Three-year-old season ===
Going into the 1892 season Orme was a strong favourite for the Epsom Derby, with odds as short as 2/1 in December. In March he was still favourite, but had drifted out slightly to 5/2 due to the support for stablemate La Fleche.

==== Suspected poisoning ====
In late April there were reports that Orme had a sore throat. This caused Orme to drift in the betting for the Derby, and La Fleche became the favourite. Orme was withdrawn from the 2000 Guineas, but returned to doing gentle exercise and it was hoped that he would still be able to make the Derby. The Duke of Westminster hinted that he had been poisoned. In early May, Orme had still not improved, and connections stated that he had been poisoned with mercury. It was suspected that the culprit may have been a well-known backer of Derby rival La Fleche, with the poison being administered in a lozenge that Orme chewed, blistering his tongue. However, a dentist that removed part of a decayed tooth from Orme suggested that the illness was not due to poisoning, but to the decayed tooth.

By mid-May it was clear that he would not make the Derby and he was removed from the race on the 23 May. Orme's trainer John Porter and Williams, the veterinary surgeon, remained convinced that he had been poisoned and was not just suffering from bad teeth. A reward of £1,000 was even offered for information that would lead to the conviction of the guilty party. The poisoning was investigated by George Lewis, a solicitor, who concluded that the horse had been poisoned. He stated that the horse was fine on the morning of the 21 April, but a few hours later his tongue was so inflamed he could not hold it in his mouth; something so sudden, Lewis argued, could not have been caused by a decaying tooth. He suggested that the poison may have in fact been attempted to be administered by some ball being put down his throat, but due to the struggles of the horse, it burst in his mouth, blistering his tongue. The Derby was won by Sir Hugo, but many believed that Orme would have won easily had he made the race.

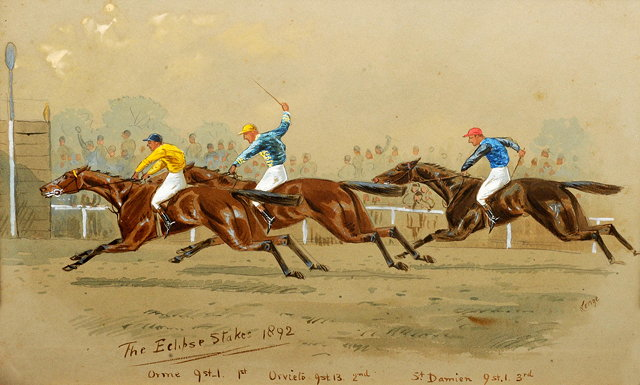
Illustration of the 1892 Eclipse Stakes, showing Orme beating Orvieto

==== Summer return ====
Porter ran Orme in a trial four days before the Eclipse Stakes at Sandown Park as preparation. He raced against his five-year-old half-brother Blue Green and the six-year-old Ormuz. Despite conceding weight to both of them, he won by the trial by two lengths from Ormuz. In the Eclipse he faced six rivals and started the 5/4 favourite, with Sussex Stakes winner Orvieto next in the betting at 11/4. During the race Orme was ridden in the middle of the field. As they turned into the finishing straight, Orme and Orvieto were close behind the two leaders; the two then took over the lead in the straight. As they neared the finish, Orvieto had a slight advantage, but as Barrett asked Orme for an effort, he responded and got in front to win by a neck from Orvieto, with St. Damien finishing only three quarters of a length behind Orvieto. The race was worth over £9000. Twelve days later Orme lined up as the 1/5 favourite for the Sussex Stakes. In the last few furlongs he battled with Watercress, and it was not until 50 yards from the finish that he came out on top, going on to win by a head from Watercress.

==== St. Leger Stakes ====
Orme had apparently improved significantly since Goodwood, and jockey George Barrett said, "I would stake my life he can beat Watercress 100 yards. I never was on such a horse in my life." Orme's previous wins made him favourite for the race, starting at 10/11, with 1000 Guineas and Epsom Oaks winner La Fleche second favourite at 7/2. Also near the front of the betting were Derby winner Sir Hugo at 10/1 and May Duke at 100/7.

In the race the early pace was slow, and Barrett positioned Orme near the front of the field. As they turned into the finishing straight, Orme was just leading from La Fleche, but Barrett soon picked up the whip and it was clear Orme was beaten. La Fleche went on to win easily by two lengths from Sir Hugo, with Watercress a further three lengths back in third, May Duke in fourth and Orme in fifth. The remainder of the field, led by The Lover, were at least twenty lengths behind Orme. After the race Barrett said: "I never was so disappointed in my life. He never took hold of his bit as he used to do; run as dead as a stone, and wouldn't make an effort." Other jockeys in the race agreed, saying Orme was "sulking" throughout the race. After the race, some suggested that Orme simply did not stay, the St Leger distance being too far for him.

==== Autumn ====
Orme next raced in the Great Foal Stakes at Newmarket. He won easily by 1½ lengths from Versailles, with Dunure in third place. He then faced only one rival in the Champion Stakes, Orvieto, whom he defeated in the Eclipse. Orme started the 1/3 favourite and made the running, leading by a length with two furlongs to run. Barrett then asked Orme to quicken, and Orvieto could not keep up, with Orme going on to win by a couple of lengths.

Two weeks later he faced Sir Hugo, Orvieto, El Diablo and Frank Marsh in the Limekiln Stakes at the Newmarket Houghton meeting. Orme started the 4/5 favourite, and with two furlongs to run he strode into the lead. Without even being asked for an effort, he won easily by three lengths from El Diablo, with Sir Hugo in third. The next day he won the Subscription Stakes easily from Porridge, after leading from the start and never being caught. He raced again the next day, his third race in as many days, in a Free Handicap Sweepstakes over ten furlongs where he faced five opponents. Orme started as the 4/6 favourite, Bushey Park was at 5/1. Next in the betting came El Diablo, The Lover and Therapia all priced at 100/12. Bushey Park led in the early stages until Orme went into the lead with about two furlongs left to run. El Diablo overtook Orme in the final 100 yards and beat him by one and a half lengths. The Lover finished in third place, three quarters of a length behind Orme. Orme had to carry 16 pounds more weight than El Diablo and 22 pounds more than The Lover.

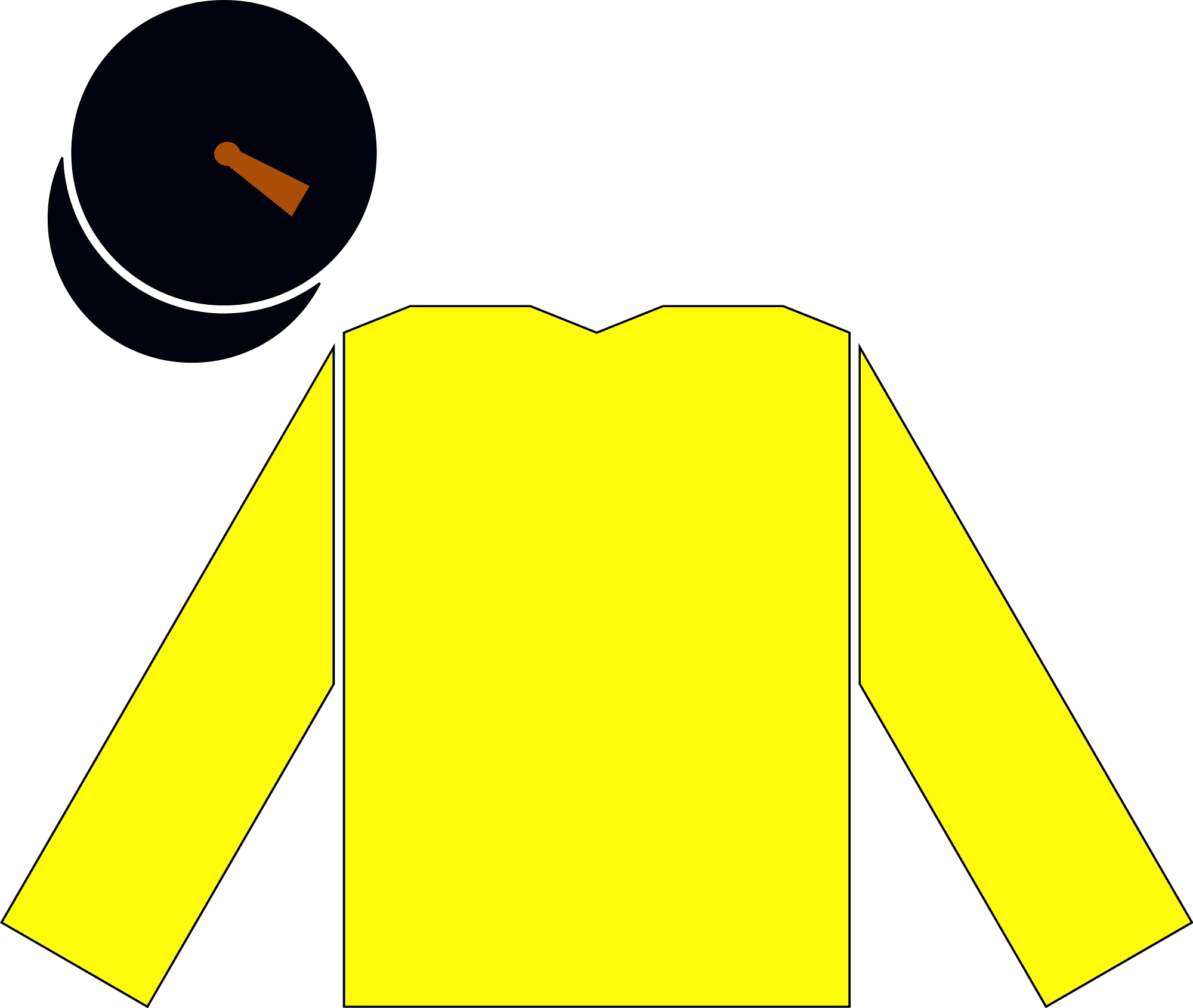
Racing colours of the Duke of Westminster

=== 1893: Four-year-old season ===
Orme returned to the track as a four-year-old in the Rous Memorial Stakes at Royal Ascot. His only opposition was the four-year-old filly Lady Lena. Lady Lena briefly challenged Orme in the closing stages, but new jockey Morny Cannon only had to shake the reins a couple of times and Orme went away to win easily by a couple of lengths. He then went back to Sandown to attempt to win another Eclipse Stakes. He started the 2/1 second favourite, with the evens favourite being La Fleche who beat him in the St Leger. La Fleche was being hard ridden a long way from the finish. Soon after Orme took over the lead, but began to hang left. In the final furlong Medicis passed La Fleche and began to challenge Orme, but could not get on terms and Orme won by half a length, with La Fleche a further three lengths back in third.

Orme and La Fleche met again in the Gordon Stakes at Goodwood with two other opponents, Watercress and Royal Harry. Starting favourite, Orme had La Fleche in trouble with more than a quarter of a mile still to run. He seemed to have the race won, but then veered left forcing Morny Cannon to pull him back and allowing La Fleche to draw level. However Orme pulled away again and won by a neck, with Watercress a further six lengths back in third. Orme's final race came in the Limekiln Stakes where he had to carry 10 stone. He finished second to Childwick, who was receiving 33 pounds. During the autumn Orme's legs had started to give him trouble and during the Limekiln a suspensory ligament gave way. This injury brought an end to his racing career, and he was retired to stud. Throughout his racing career he won a total of £32,528 in prize money.

== Race record ==
Date	Race name	D (F)	Course	Prize	Odds	Runners	Place	Margin (L)	Winner/Runner-up	Time	Jockey	Ref.
28 July 1891	Richmond Stakes	6	Goodwood	£1062	4/5	8	1	0.75	Flyaway		George Barrett	
30 July 1891	Prince of Wales' Stakes	6	Goodwood	£1800	1/2	6	1	1	Dunure		George Barrett	
29 September 1891	Lancashire Plate	7	Manchester	£8971 15s	7/4	9	2	0.5	Signorina	1:34.8	George Barrett	
15 October 1891	Middle Park Plate	6	Newmarket	£2540	8/15	10	1	2	El Diablo	1:20.2	George Barrett	
29 October 1891	Dewhurst Plate	7	Newmarket	£1507	6/100	3	1	0.75	El Diablo	1:39.0	George Barrett	
30 October 1891	Home-bred Foal Post Stakes	5.5	Newmarket	£300	3/100	4	1	2	Esmond		George Barrett	
15 July 1892	Eclipse Stakes	10	Sandown Park	£9284 10s	5/4	7	1	Neck	Orvieto	2:15.0	George Barrett	
27 July 1892	Sussex Stakes	8	Goodwood	£822	1/5	6	1	Head	Watercress	1:43.4	George Barrett	
7 September 1892	St. Leger Stakes	14.5	Doncaster	£5400	10/11	11	5		La Fleche	3:14.6	George Barrett	
27 September 1892	Great Foal Stakes	10	Newmarket	£645	5/4	5	1	1.5	Versailles	2:15.8	George Barrett	
11 October 1892	Champion Stakes	10	Newmarket	£930	1/3	2	1	2	Orvieto	2:18.8	George Barrett	
25 October 1892	Limekiln Stakes	8	Newmarket	£822	4/5	5	1	3	El Diablo	1:49.2	George Barrett	
26 October 1892	Subscription Stakes	6	Newmarket	£400	1/4	5	1	1.5	Porridge		George Barrett	
27 October 1892	Free Handicap	10	Newmarket	£1500	4/6	6	2	1.5	El Diablo		George Barrett	
15 June 1893	Rous Memorial Stakes	7.5	Ascot	£930	1/5	2	1	2	Lady Lena		Morny Cannon	
14 July 1893	Eclipse Stakes	10	Sandown Park	£9285	2/1	5	1	0.5	Medicis	2:11.8	Morny Cannon	
27 July 1893	Gordon Stakes	10	Goodwood	£501	4/6	4	1	Neck	La Fleche	2:19.0	Morny Cannon	
24 October 1893	Limekiln Stakes	8	Newmarket	£1025	4/5	3	2	0.75	Childwick	1:45.0	Morny Cannon	

Note: F = Furlongs, L = Lengths

== Assessment ==
At the end of 1891 he was considered by many to be the top two-year-old. During the 1892 season he earned £13,023, the second highest of any horse and only bettered by La Fleche. By the time he retired at the end of the 1893 season, he had earned £32,528 throughout his racing career. This was the third highest of any horse in history, behind only Donovan and Ayrshire. When Orme was at his best, John Porter rated him 7 to 10 pounds inferior to Ormonde, whom Porter also trained. Porter also believed that Orme was a better racehorse at age four than he had been at two and three.

== Stud record ==
Orme was retired to stud at the end of his four-year-old season, and on 26 October 1893 he left Newmarket for Eaton Stud. His first covering was St. Mary, a daughter of Hermit, which resulted in his first foal (a chestnut colt) being born in January 1895. His stud fee for 1898 was 200 guineas, plus one guinea for the groom. Orme became a successful stallion and was champion sire of Great Britain and Ireland in 1899, with more than double the winnings of any other sire that year, largely thanks to his son Flying Fox. His son Duke of Westminster was sold for £20,050 as a two-year-old. His fee was still 200 guineas in 1902. In total Orme sired 242 winners of races worth a total of £122,568.

=== Notable progeny ===
s = stallion, m = mare, g = gelding

Foaled	Name	Sex	Major Wins	Ref.
1896	Flying Fox	s	New Stakes, 2000 Guineas, Epsom Derby, St Leger Stakes, Eclipse Stakes, Princess of Wales's Stakes
1896	Frontier	s	Dewhurst Plate, Ascot Derby Stakes
1896	Harrow	g	Lingfield Park Stakes
1897	Paigle	m	Great Sapling Plate
1897	The Raft	s	Sussex Stakes
1898	Orchid	s	Champagne Stakes
1899	Duke of Westminster	s	New Stakes
1904	Orby	s	Epsom Derby, Irish Derby
1904	Witch Elm	m	Cheveley Park Stakes, 1000 Guineas
1905	Vamose	s	Prince of Wales' Stakes, Imperial Produce Stakes

Flying Fox went on to be champion sire in France three times. His progeny included Prix du Jockey Club and Grand Prix de Paris winner Ajax, Prix de Diane winner Flying Star, Poule d'Essai des Poulains and Prix du Cadran winner Gouvernant, Poule d'Essai des Poulains and Prix du Jockey Club winner Dagor, Poule d'Essai des Poulains and Eclipse Stakes winner Val d'Or and Prix de la Forêt winner Adam.

Orby went on to sire Epsom Derby and St. James's Palace Stakes winner Grand Parade and 1000 Guineas winner Diadem. Orme's son Missel Thrush sired July Cup winner Thrush. Orme's daughter Topiary was the dam of the St Leger and Eclipse winner Tracery. Orme's daughter Optime was the dam of the American horse Sysonby, who was only defeated once in his career. Another daughter Osella was the dam of Grosser Preis von Baden winner Ossian and Preis der Diana winner Ostrea.

Orme was pensioned from stud duty in 1912. He died at Eaton Stud on 17 September 1915 aged 26 and was buried near his grandsire Bend Or. Orme's sire line continues today mainly through Ajax's son Teddy.

== Pedigree ==
Pedigree of Orme, bay stallion, 1889
Sire Ormonde (GB) b. 1883	Bend Or ch. 1877	Doncaster ch. 1870	Stockwell
Sire Ormonde (GB) b. 1883	Bend Or ch. 1877	Doncaster ch. 1870	Marigold
Sire Ormonde (GB) b. 1883	Bend Or ch. 1877	Rouge Rose ch. 1865	Thormanby
Sire Ormonde (GB) b. 1883	Bend Or ch. 1877	Rouge Rose ch. 1865	Ellen Horne
Sire Ormonde (GB) b. 1883	Lily Agnes b. 1871	Macaroni b. 1860	Sweetmeat
Sire Ormonde (GB) b. 1883	Lily Agnes b. 1871	Macaroni b. 1860	Jocose
Sire Ormonde (GB) b. 1883	Lily Agnes b. 1871	Polly Agnes b./br. 1865	The Cure
Sire Ormonde (GB) b. 1883	Lily Agnes b. 1871	Polly Agnes b./br. 1865	Miss Agnes
Dam Angelica (GB) b. 1879	Galopin br. 1872	Vedette br. 1854	Voltigeur
Dam Angelica (GB) b. 1879	Galopin br. 1872	Vedette br. 1854	Mrs Ridgway
Dam Angelica (GB) b. 1879	Galopin br. 1872	Flying Duchess b. 1853	The Flying Dutchman
Dam Angelica (GB) b. 1879	Galopin br. 1872	Flying Duchess b. 1853	Merope
Dam Angelica (GB) b. 1879	St. Angela b. 1865	King Tom b. 1851	Harkaway
Dam Angelica (GB) b. 1879	St. Angela b. 1865	King Tom b. 1851	Pocahontas
Dam Angelica (GB) b. 1879	St. Angela b. 1865	Adeline b. 1851	Ion
Dam Angelica (GB) b. 1879	St. Angela b. 1865	Adeline b. 1851	Little Fairy

Note: b. = Bay, br. = Brown, ch. = Chestnut
