= George Barrett (jockey) =

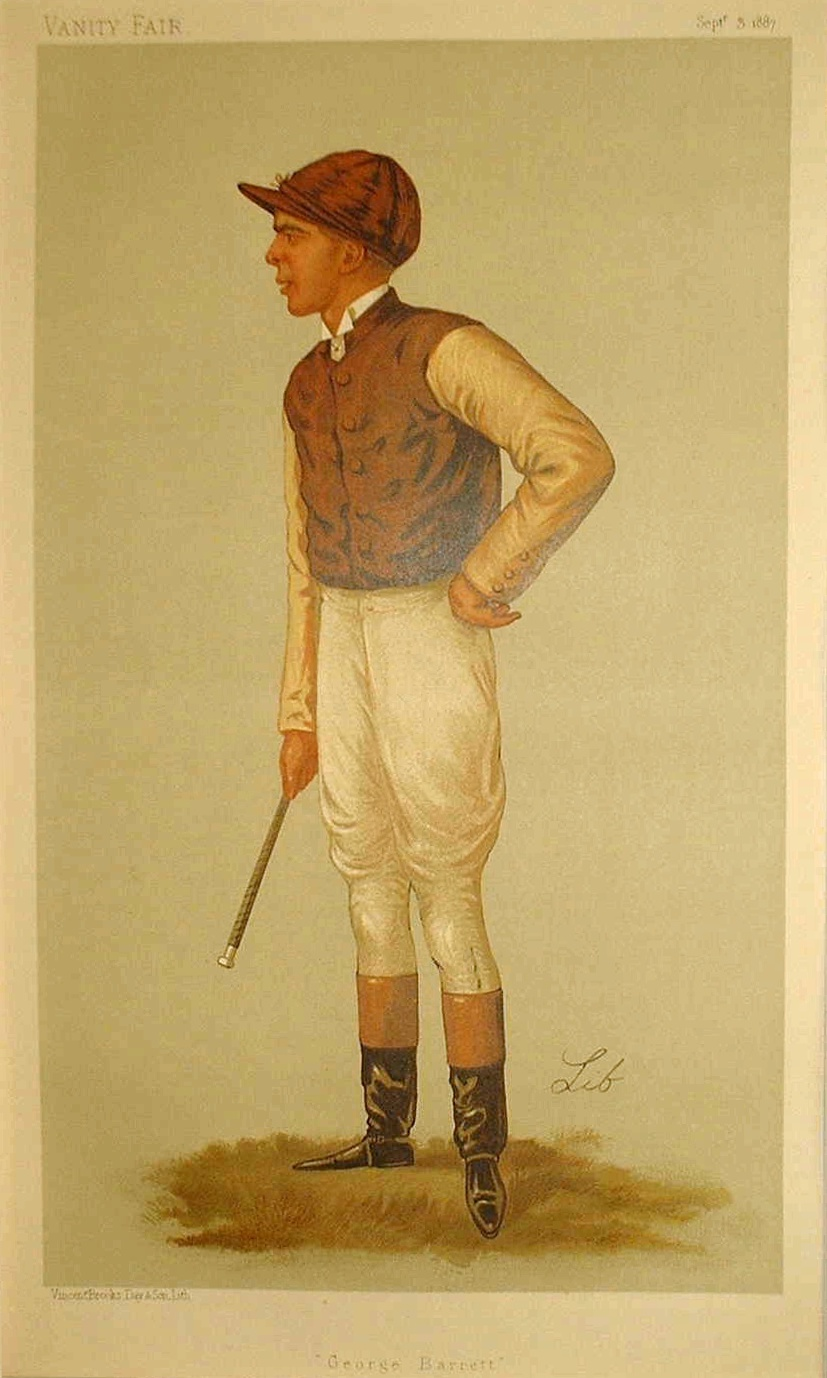
- George Barrett illustration by Lib in Vanity Fair

Personal information
- Born: 29 May 1863 Metfield, Suffolk; England
- Died: 25 February 1898 (aged 34) Newmarket, Suffolk, England
- Occupation: Jockey

Horse racing career
- Sport: Horse racing
- Career wins: 1,401

Major racing wins
- 1000 Guineas (1885, 1892); 2000 Guineas (1886, 1891); Hardwicke Stakes (1886); Epsom Derby (1891); St Leger Stakes (1891); Middle Park Plate (1891); Dewhurst Plate (1891); Epsom Oaks (1892); Eclipse Stakes (1892); Sussex Stakes (1892); Lancashire Plate (1892); Champion Stakes (1892)

Significant horses
- Common, La Fleche, Orme, Ormonde

Colin George Barrett (29 May 1863 – 25 February 1898), was a leading jockey in the United Kingdom in the 1880s and 1890s. He was born on 29 May 1863 in Metfield, Suffolk. He was apprentice jockey to W. H. Manser at Newmarket. His first ride came in July 1877, with him riding his first winner. During his early career he could do weights as low at 5 st 7 lb (34.9 kg). He rode six winners in his first year. His first classic win came the 1885 1000 Guineas aboard Farewell. He rode the unbeaten Ormonde to victory in the 2000 Guineas in 1886 after regular jockey Fred Archer riding Saraband. In 1892 he rode Orme and La Fleche to a number of top class victories. Barrett was never champion jockey, but was second four times, including finished four winners behind Morny Cannon in 1891. He stopped riding after 1894, when his health began to fail, and died on 25 February 1898.
