= Witch Elm =

British-bred Thoroughbred racehorse

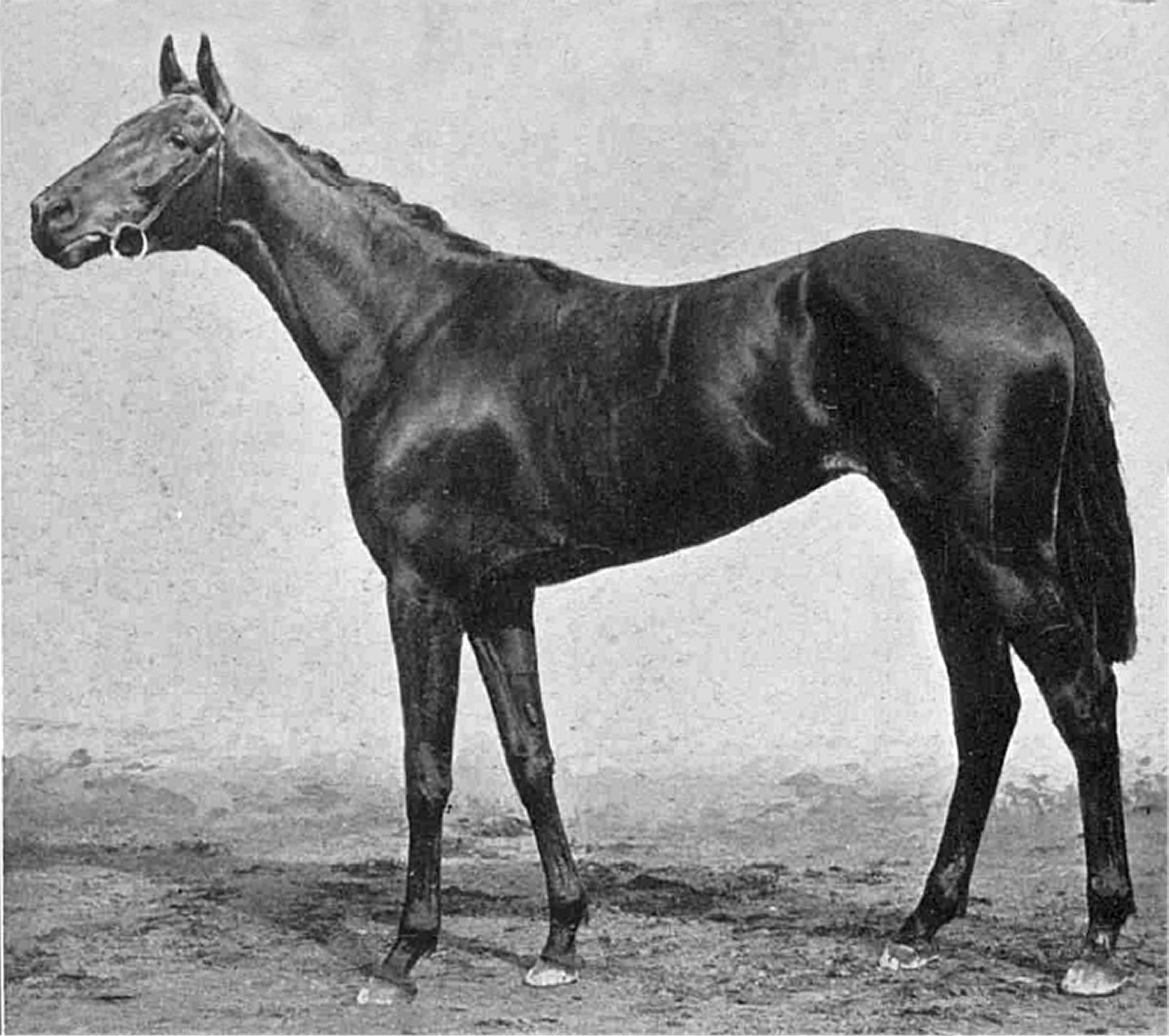
- Witch Elm in 1907.
- Sire: Orme
- Grandsire: Ormonde
- Dam: Cannie Lassie
- Damsire: Ayrshire
- Sex: Mare
- Foaled: 1904
- Country: Great Britain
- Colour: Bay
- Owner: William Hall Walker
- Trainer: Jack Robinson

Major wins
- Cheveley Park Stakes (1906); 1000 Guineas (1907)
- Last updated on 3 September 2012

Witch Elm (1904–1923) was a Thoroughbred racehorse owned by the William Hall Walker and trained by Jack Robinson. She was a daughter of Orme, who won the Eclipse Stakes twice and her dam was Cannie Lass, who was a daughter of Ayrshire.

== Racing career ==
She won five races out of the nine she contested as a two-year-old, including the Cheveley Park Stakes and the West of Scotland Foal Stakes at Ayr. Amongst her other races were a fifth place in the National Breeders' Produce Stakes at Sandown and a third place in the Lancashire Breeders' Produce Stakes at Liverpool. As a three-year-old she easily won the 1000 Guineas from Fragility after starting the 4/1 favourite, but could not repeat this classic winning form over longer distances.

== Breeding career ==
Witch Elm did not produce any top racehorses, but some of her descendants became classic winners in Brazil. In 1919 Witch Elm produced the filly Lady Clarence, who was sired by Queen Alexandra Stakes winner Royal Realm. Witch Elm died in 1923 at the National Stud.

== Pedigree ==
Pedigree of Witch Elm, bay mare, 1904
Sire Orme b. 1889	Ormonde b. 1883	Bend Or ch. 1877	Doncaster
Sire Orme b. 1889	Ormonde b. 1883	Bend Or ch. 1877	Rouge Rose
Sire Orme b. 1889	Ormonde b. 1883	Lily Agnes b. 1871	Macaroni
Sire Orme b. 1889	Ormonde b. 1883	Lily Agnes b. 1871	Polly Agnes
Sire Orme b. 1889	Angelica b. 1879	Galopin* br. 1872	Vedette
Sire Orme b. 1889	Angelica b. 1879	Galopin* br. 1872	Flying Duchess
Sire Orme b. 1889	Angelica b. 1879	St. Angela b. 1865	King Tom
Sire Orme b. 1889	Angelica b. 1879	St. Angela b. 1865	Adeline
Dam Cannie Lassie b./br. 1898	Ayrshire b. 1885	Hampton b. 1872	Lord Clifden
Dam Cannie Lassie b./br. 1898	Ayrshire b. 1885	Hampton b. 1872	Lady Langden
Dam Cannie Lassie b./br. 1898	Ayrshire b. 1885	Atalanta b. 1878	Galopin*
Dam Cannie Lassie b./br. 1898	Ayrshire b. 1885	Atalanta b. 1878	Feronia
Dam Cannie Lassie b./br. 1898	Wise Girl ch. 1894	Wisdom b. 1873	Blinkhoolie
Dam Cannie Lassie b./br. 1898	Wise Girl ch. 1894	Wisdom b. 1873	Aline
Dam Cannie Lassie b./br. 1898	Wise Girl ch. 1894	Touch Me Not ch. 1887	Muncaster
Dam Cannie Lassie b./br. 1898	Wise Girl ch. 1894	Touch Me Not ch. 1887	Thistle

Note: b. = Bay, br. = Brown, ch. = Chestnut

* Witch Elm was inbred 3x4 to Galopin. This means that he appears once in the third generation and once in the fourth generation of her pedigree.
