= Étincelle-class gunboat =

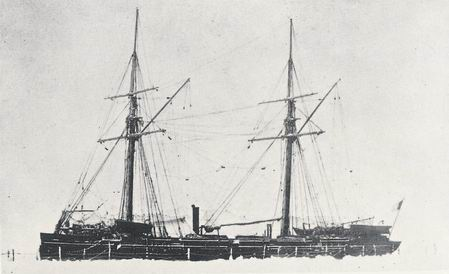
- Portrait of Flèche

Class overview
- Name: Étincelle class
- Operators: French Navy
- Completed: 12

General characteristics
- Type: Gunboat
- Tons burthen: 350 tonnes
- Length: 43.9 m (144 ft 0 in)
- Beam: 7.8 m (25 ft 7 in)
- Draught: 3.2 m (10 ft 6 in)
- Propulsion: Sail; Creusot steam engine
- Complement: 78
- Armament: 4 × 50-pounder guns; 20 × rifled guns
- Armour: Timber

The Étincelle-class gunboat was a class of twelve gunboats built for the French Navy in 1855, used in the Crimean War.

== Design ==
The Étincelle class was designed around a wooden hull and a steam and sail propulsion. They carried 50-pounder guns and an assortment of smaller rifled pieces.

== Ships ==
Name	Ship builder	Launched	Fate
Aigrette	Le Havre	1855	Lost after an accidental rupture of the engine off Antivari on 17 August 1859
Alarme	Toulon	1855	Sold for breaking 1871
Avalanche	Le Havre	1855	Sold for breaking 1866
Dragonne	Le Havre	1855	Sold for breaking 1867
Éclair	Nantes	1855	Sold for breaking 1872
Étincelle	Cherbourg	1855	Lost in the Mozambique Channel in March 1862, probably due to a typhoon
Flamme	Brest	1855	Sold for breaking 1872
Flèche	Toulon	1855	Sold for breaking 1882
Fulminante	Le Havre	1855	Sold for breaking 1879
Fusée	Toulon	1855	Sold for breaking 1868
Grenade	Brest	1855	Sold for breaking 1871
Mitraille	Toulon	1855	Sold for breaking 1868
