= Mornington Cannon =

British racing jockey (1873–1962)

Morny Cannon
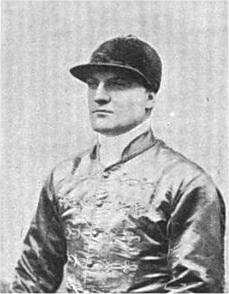
- Circa 1900

Personal information
- Born: 21 May 1873 Houghton, Hampshire; United Kingdom
- Died: 1 June 1962 (aged 89)
- Occupation: Jockey
- Children: 1

Horse racing career
- Sport: Horse racing
- Career wins: 1,879

Major racing wins
- Coronation Stakes (1892–1894, 1896, 1898); Craven Stakes (1893–94, 1897, 1899, 1902, 1906); Prince of Wales's Stakes (1895–96, 1899, 1900, 1904, 1905); Middle Park Plate (1896); Doncaster Cup (1897); Lincolnshire Handicap (1897); City and Suburban Handicap (1890, 1891,1895, 1896, 1899, 1900); Eclipse Stakes (1893, 1899); Ascot Gold Cup (1902); British Classic race wins: St. Leger Stakes (1894, 1899); Epsom Derby (1899); 2,000 Guineas (1899); Epsom Oaks (1900, 1903)

Racing awards
- British flat racing Champion Jockey (1891, 1892, 1894–1897)

Significant horses
- Flying Fox, Orme, Throstle, William the Third

Herbert Mornington Cannon (21 May 1873–1 June 1962), commonly referred to as Morny Cannon, was a six-time Champion jockey in the United Kingdom in the 1890s. He holds the records for the most wins by a jockey in the Craven Stakes, Coronation Stakes and Prince of Wales's Stakes. His most famous mount was Flying Fox who won the British Triple Crown in 1899. He was the son of English jockey and trainer Tom Cannon (1846–1917). In his day he was considered the most perfect master of style and he epitomised "the art of jockeyship".

== Early life ==
Cannon was born on 21 May 1873 in Houghton, Hampshire, the same day that his father Tom Cannon won the Somersetshire Stakes, at Bath, on a colt named Mornington (who also won the 1873 City and Suburban Handicap). Cannon derived his middle name from his father's mount and went by the nickname "Morny" for much of his racing career.

Cannon was educated at Banister's Court, Southampton, and afterwards at Queenswood College by a private tutor.

== Racing career ==
Cannon had his first mount in public on 11 October 1886, on his father's mare Coraline at Kempton in the Middlesex All-aged Selling Plate. He finished well behind. His first mount in 1887 was at the Epsom Spring Meeting. Claiming the 5 pound apprentice allowance, he rode Koster at 6 stone 3 pounds in the Metropolitan Stakes. Cannon's first race win occurred shortly before his fourteenth birthday, on 20 May 1887, in the City Bowl Salisbury. on Mr H E Tidy's Flint. By 1900 Cannon had won 1,542 races. His most famous mount was Flying Fox with which he captured the 1899 St. Leger Stakes, 2,000 Guineas and Epsom Derby, securing the Triple Crown. During his career, he was noted as having good hands for piloting 2-year-old horses.

=== Morny Cannon’s Doncaster ===
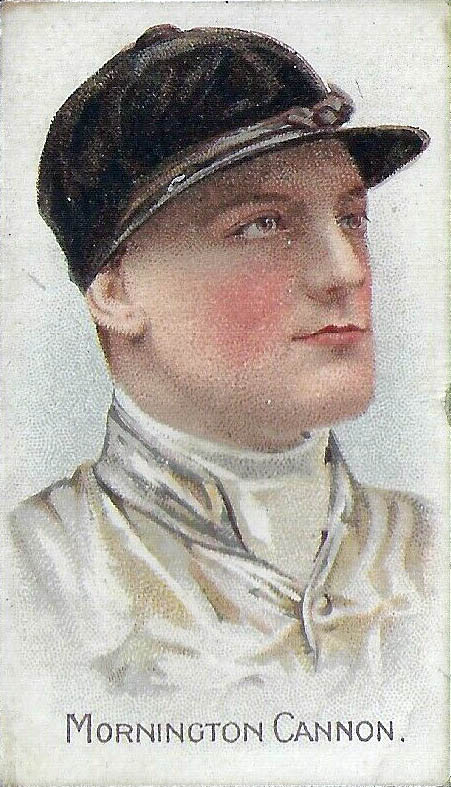
Morny Cannon, from a 1906 cigarette card

Cannon monopolised the 1894 Doncaster St Leger meeting. His wins were as follows: First Day: -Stand Plate (9 runners), Rowallan, 100/8; Champagne Stakes (5), Solero, 10/1; Great Yorkshire Handicap (16), Bushey Park, 100/12; Doncaster Welter (13), Lumberer, 100/8. Second Day: – Milton Stakes (7), Newmarket 4/5; St Leger (8), Throstle, 50/1. Third Day: – Juvenile Selling (10), Queen Saraband, 9/4; Rous Plate (6), Matabele, 100/30; Portland Plate (15), Grey Leg, 8/1; Corporation Selling (10), St Ignatius, 11/8. He drew a blank on the fourth day but was second in the Doncaster Cup on the 100/6 shot Portland. There were 26 races over the four days and Cannon rode in all but five of them yielding ten wins, four seconds, two thirds. There was almost one more because after dead-heating in the Tattersalls Stakes on The Brook he was beaten in the run-off. As well as winning most of the principle races the majority of his winners were outsiders and Throstle's 50/1 victory in the St Leger was sensational. He was originally entered as a pacemaker for his more fancied stable mate, Matchbox, but it was Morny's idea to change tactics and so bring off a memorable success. As John Porter, Throstle's trainer understated, Morny "was in irresistible form."

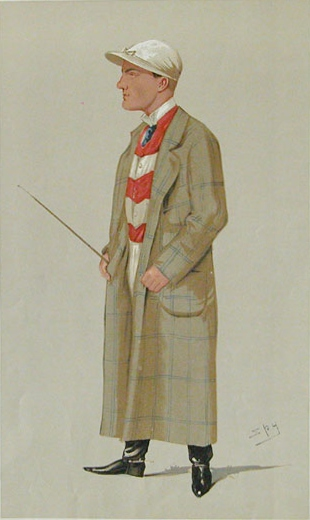
1891 Vanity Fair caricature by Leslie Ward.

=== Diamond Jubilee ===
Cannon would have ridden another Triple Crown winner in 1900, but Diamond Jubilee had an intense dislike of the jockey. Jack Watts, Prince of Wales's jockey, had already refused to take the ride on the notoriously unruly Diamond Jubilee, before connections turned to Cannon. Cannon had ridden the horse in the Boscawen Stakes in 1900, achieving a narrow win over Paigle in a finish that required a generous application of whip on Diamond Jubilee. The horse never again allowed Cannon to ride him, rolling on top of the jockey on one occasion. Cannon's advice to the Prince was that "a brute like that ought to be shot," whilst claiming that he would not ride the horse for a pension. Diamond Jubilee was instead ridden by newcomer Herbert Jones during his Triple Crown campaign.

=== Career statistics ===
Year	Wins	Mounts	Per cent	Position	Reference
1887	9
1888	12	106	11.3
1889	21	217	9.6
1890	39	306	12.7
1891	137	609	22.5	1
1892	182	729	24.9	1
1893	168	666	25.5	2
1894	167	693	23.9	1
1895	184	711	25.8	1
1896	164	721	22.7	1
1897	145	624	23.2	1
1898	140	539	25.9	3
1899	120	468	25.6	3
1900	82	490	16.7	6
1901	76	451	16.8	6
1902	68	395	17.2	7
1903	53	349	15.1	8
1904	47	329	14.2	12
1905	28	217		21
1906	25	146		24
1907	14	99
1908

Cannon won six Jockeys' Championship and retired from racing in 1909.

== Riding style ==
Morny's spell at the top was curtailed by rising weight and the 'American Invasion' of jockeys, which led to faster run races and riding in a crouching style with a shorter length of stirrup.At the time, despite the success of the American style of riding, many were convinced it was not the proper way to sit a horse. They felt sure in the long run the traditional English style of riding would prove the more successful, as it was certainly the more elegant and artistic. However, in their prime, there was not much to choose between "Tod" Sloan and Cannon as horseman, but Morny was well clear when it came to honesty and integrity.

Despite his success in the saddle, trainer Mat Dawson, Fred Archer's mentor, dismissed him as a 'dilettante jockey'. Most turfites, however, concurred with Rapier's opinion that Morny was always a "the most conscientious of professional horseman." Cannon was one of the old school of jockeys like Fordham and Archer, but towards the end of his career altered his riding methods, having his saddle further forward and shortening his stirrup leathers. He was also known for leaving his challenge very late in races, a trait he had learnt from his father, and considered the "English style", to win by the narrowest margin. Fellow jockey and later trainer, George Lambton commented, "It really was extraordinary, after apparently being out of a race, how he would sweep down on three or four struggling horses and beat them", also adding, "there is no doubt that most of the jockeys were frightened to death of Morny with his tremendous rush at the finish." Such tactics were not always popular. Another trainer, John Porter believed it cost him the 1901 Derby on William The Third. However, weighing room colleague, Danny Maher, considered Morny as, "one of the finest horsemen that he had ever fought out a finish."

== Personal life, retirement and death ==
Cannon's mother was Catherine Day, a granddaughter of English horse trainer John Barham Day. Cannon had three brothers who were also jockeys: Kempton Cannon (1879–1951), Tom Cannon, Jr. (1872–1945) and Charles Cannon (1884–1963). His sister Margaret married Ernest Piggott, who was the grandfather of champion jockey Lester Piggott.

Cannon married Nelly Dennett Gray, of The Park, Nottingham, on 11 January 1894, at the old parish church, St Mary Abbots, Kensington. The wedding was a quiet one owing to the recent death of the bride's father. They honeymooned in Brighton with a view to setting up home near Danebury.

Increasingly suffering from rheumatism, Cannon announced his retirement from racing in April 1909

Following the end of his marriage, Cannon had a relationship with Emily Harris, a spinster who worked in workhouses around Brighton and they had a son Herbert Claud Harris (1916-2000). Harris changed his surname to Cannon by deed poll on 8 January 1945.

Cannon lived in Brighton and Hove for many years until his death on 1 June 1962, aged 89.

== In popular culture ==
Cannon is mentioned in James Joyce's "Ulysses", "Morny Cannon is riding him."

== See also ==
- List of significant families in British horse racing

== Bibliography ==
- Tanner, Michael; Cranham, Gerry (1992). Great Jockeys of the Flat. Enfield, Middlesex: Guinness Publishing. ISBN 0-85112-989-7.
- Wright, Howard (1986). The Encyclopaedia of Flat Racing. London: Robert Hale. ISBN 0-7090-2639-0.
