= HMS Fleche =

Two vessels of the Royal Navy have borne the name HMS Fleche, after the French for "arrow":

- HMS Fleche was the French 14-gun corvette Fleche launched in 1768 that the British captured in 1794. She wrecked in the bay of San Fiorenzo in November 1795.
- HMS Fleche (1798) was the French privateer Caroline, which HMS Phoenix captured on 31 May 1798. The British took her into the navy as an 18-gun sloop. She was wrecked at the mouth of the Elbe on 24 May 1810 due to the errors of her pilots. All her crew were saved.
- Fleche was a French sloop of twenty 8-pounder guns. While under the command of lieutenant de vaisseau Bonamy, she transported deportees from Nantes to the Seychelles in 1801. It was near there that HMS Victor first engaged her on 2 September 1801 and captured her on 5 September. Fleche grounded and her crew set her on fire. The British were able to put the fire out, but she fell on her side and sank, and so was never actually taken into the Royal Navy.

== See also ==
- French gunboat Flèche (1855)
