= Flying Fox (horse) =

British-bred Thoroughbred racehorse

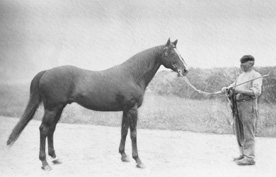
- Flying Fox, c.1905
- Sire: Orme
- Grandsire: Ormonde
- Dam: Vampire
- Damsire: Galopin
- Sex: Stallion
- Foaled: 1896
- Country: United Kingdom of Great Britain and Ireland
- Colour: Bay
- Breeder: Eaton Stud
- Owner: Hugh Grosvenor, 1st Duke of Westminster
- Trainer: John Porter
- Record: 11: 9-2-0
- Earnings: £40,096

Major wins
- New Stakes (1898); Criterion Stakes (1898); 2,000 Guineas (1899); Epsom Derby (1899); St. Leger Stakes (1899); Eclipse Stakes (1899); Jockey Club Stakes (1899); Princess of Wales's Stakes (1899)

Awards
- 8th U.K. Triple Crown Champion (1899); Leading sire in France (1904, 1905, 1913)

Honours
- LNER Class A1 locomotive no. 4475
- Last updated on 29 January 2011

Flying Fox (1896–1911) was a champion British Thoroughbred racehorse who won the 1899 English Triple Crown and was the leading sire in France three times.

== Background ==
He was sired by Orme who in turn was sired by Ormonde, the 1886 Triple Crown winner. Their victories made owner Hugh Grosvenor, 1st Duke of Westminster, the only person to own two English Triple Crown winners. His dam was the high-strung mare, somewhat aptly named Vampire, by Galopin. Vampire also produced these horses from six matings with Orme: Flying Lemur (£1,325, a stud failure); Vamose (£5,604 and at stud in France with limited success) and Pipistrello (a non-winner and useless as a stallion), Wetaria, and Vane (produced the Royal Hunt Cup and Ebor Handicap winner, Weathervane). Flying Fox was intensely inbred (3m x 2f) to Galopin.

== Racing career ==
Flying Fox was a very difficult colt to handle and only raced for two years. However, he met with enormous success under trainer John Porter, whom the National Horseracing Museum says was "undoubtedly the most successful trainer of the Victorian era." Flying Fox won three of his five starts at age two, and then at age three went undefeated while becoming only the 8th horse in history to win the Triple Crown. In his sixth and last race of his season and of his career, he won the Jockey Club Stakes at Newmarket.

== Stud record ==
The Duke of Westminster died near the end of 1899 and the following year Flying Fox and many of the other horses in his stable were put up for auction. Purchased for a record 37,500 guineas by the prominent French sportsman Edmond Blanc, he was brought to Blanc's Haras de Jardy horse breeding operation at Marnes-la-Coquette in what is today part of the western suburbs of Paris.

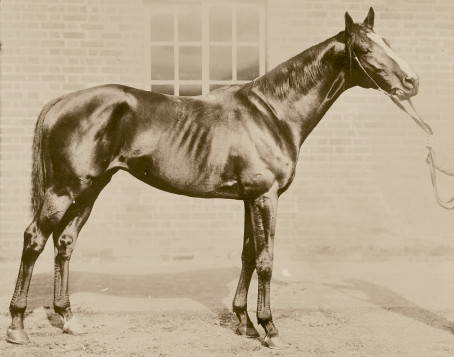
Flying Fox, c. 1900

Standing at stud at Haras de Jardy, Flying Fox enjoyed considerable success and was the leading sire in France three times, with his progeny earning £203,400 in prize money. Among his first crop was the colt Ajax, an undefeated winner of the Prix du Jockey Club as well as the Grand Prix de Paris who himself became a leading sire. Ajax was the sire of Teddy, who sired Sir Gallahad III plus the mare La Troienne who is widely regarded as one of the most influential broodmares in the history of modern Thoroughbred breeding. Flying Fox's other progeny included numerous top class winners including Val d'Or and Dagor. Descendants of Flying Fox include Gallant Fox and Citation, the 1930 and 1948 United States Triple Crown Champions and U.S. Hall of Fame colt Coaltown.

Flying Fox died at Haras de Jardy on 21 March 1911 at the age of fifteen. His skeleton is at the horse museum at Château de Saumur with a memorial at Eaton Stud in Cheshire, North West England.

== Honours ==
In 1925 the London & North Eastern Railway (LNER) began a tradition of naming locomotives after winning racehorses; LNER Class A1 locomotive no. 4475 (later no. 106, BR no. 60106) was named Flying Fox after this horse, and remained in service until December 1964. A 24-class sloop was also named for the horse; HMS Flying Fox was launched in 1918 and served for only a few years before becoming a training ship alongside in Bristol. When the Royal Naval Reserve unit headquartered in her moved ashore, the new establishment was also named HMS Flying Fox and remains active to this day.

== Pedigree ==
Pedigree of Flying Fox (GB), bay stallion, 1896
Sire Orme (GB) b. 1889	Ormonde b. 1883	Bend Or ch. 1877	Doncaster
Sire Orme (GB) b. 1889	Ormonde b. 1883	Bend Or ch. 1877	Rouge Rose
Sire Orme (GB) b. 1889	Ormonde b. 1883	Lily Agnes b. 1871	Macaroni
Sire Orme (GB) b. 1889	Ormonde b. 1883	Lily Agnes b. 1871	Polly Agnes
Sire Orme (GB) b. 1889	Angelica b. 1879	Galopin* b. 1872	Vedette
Sire Orme (GB) b. 1889	Angelica b. 1879	Galopin* b. 1872	Flying Duchess
Sire Orme (GB) b. 1889	Angelica b. 1879	St. Angela b. 1865	King Tom
Sire Orme (GB) b. 1889	Angelica b. 1879	St. Angela b. 1865	Adeline
Dam Vampire (GB) br. 1889	Galopin* b. 1872	Vedette br. 1854	Voltigeur
Dam Vampire (GB) br. 1889	Galopin* b. 1872	Vedette br. 1854	Mrs.Ridgway
Dam Vampire (GB) br. 1889	Galopin* b. 1872	Flying Duchess b. 1853	The Flying Dutchman
Dam Vampire (GB) br. 1889	Galopin* b. 1872	Flying Duchess b. 1853	Merope
Dam Vampire (GB) br. 1889	Irony ch. 1881	Rosebery b. 1872	Speculum
Dam Vampire (GB) br. 1889	Irony ch. 1881	Rosebery b. 1872	Ladylike
Dam Vampire (GB) br. 1889	Irony ch. 1881	Sarcasm b. 1871	Breadalbane
Dam Vampire (GB) br. 1889	Irony ch. 1881	Sarcasm b. 1871	Jeu d'Esprit (family: 7-d)

Note: b. = Bay, br. = Brown, ch. = Chestnut

* Flying Fox was inbred 2x3 to Galopin. This means that the stallion appears once in the second generation and once in the third generation of his pedigree.
