= La Fleche (horse) =

British-bred Thoroughbred racehorse (1889–1916)

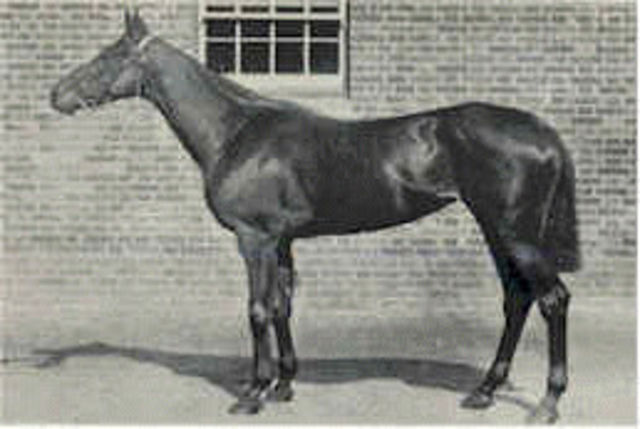
- La Fleche in training circa 1892
- Sire: St Simon
- Grandsire: Galopin
- Dam: Quiver
- Damsire: Toxophilite
- Sex: Mare
- Foaled: 1889
- Country: United Kingdom
- Colour: Brown
- Breeder: Royal Studs
- Owner: Maurice de Hirsch
- Trainer: John Porter; Richard Marsh
- Record: 24: 16-3-2
- Earnings: £35,495

Major wins
- Molecomb Stakes (1891); Champagne Stakes (1891); 1000 Guineas (1892)); Epsom Oaks (1892); Nassau Stakes (1892); St Leger (1892); Lancashire Plate (1892); Cambridgeshire Handicap (1892); Ascot Gold Cup (1894); Champion Stakes (1894)

La Fleche (1889–1916) was a British Thoroughbred racehorse and broodmare. After being sold for a world record price as a yearling in 1890, she was undefeated as a two-year-old in 1891, winning races against her own sex and defeating some of the year's leading colts. She went on to become the dominant British three-year-old of 1892, claiming the Fillies’ Triple Crown by winning the 1000 Guineas at Newmarket, the Oaks at Epsom and the St Leger at Doncaster. Her only defeat of the year came when she finished second when starting favourite for The Derby.

La Fleche remained in training for a further two seasons, winning important races such as the 1893 Liverpool Autumn Cup, the 1894 Ascot Gold Cup, and the Champion Stakes on her final appearance. In all, she won sixteen times in twenty-four racecourse appearances. After her retirement from racing she became a successful and influential broodmare.

== Background ==
La Fleche (French for The Arrow), a brown mare standing just under 16 hands high was bred by the Royal Studs at Hampton Court and was foaled on 10 March 1889. She was an exceptionally well-bred and "beautiful" filly and attracted much attention when she was sent to be auctioned as a yearling on 28 June 1890 at the Bushey Paddocks. She was bought by Lord Marcus Beresford on behalf of the financier Baron Maurice de Hirsch for a sum of 5,500 guineas, outbidding the Duke of Portland and John Porter and breaking the record for a yearling sold at auction, which had stood since 1876.

Her sire, St Simon was an unbeaten racehorse who was beginning to prove himself as an outstanding sire. By the time La Fleche was sold in 1890 he was on the way to the first of his nine sires’ championships, having sired the first two of his ten Classic winners. Her dam, Quiver produced La Fleche's full-sister Memoir, who won the Epsom Oaks and the St Leger as well as the influential broodmares Maid Marian and Satchel.

La Fleche was trained for her first two seasons by John Porter at Kingsclere. At the end of her three-year-old season she was moved to the Egerton House stable of Richard Marsh at Newmarket, Suffolk.

Attempts by anglophone writers to spell her name resulted in variations including La Fléche, Lafleche, La Flèche (the "correct" version), and La Flêche.

== Racing career ==
=== 1891: two-year-old season ===
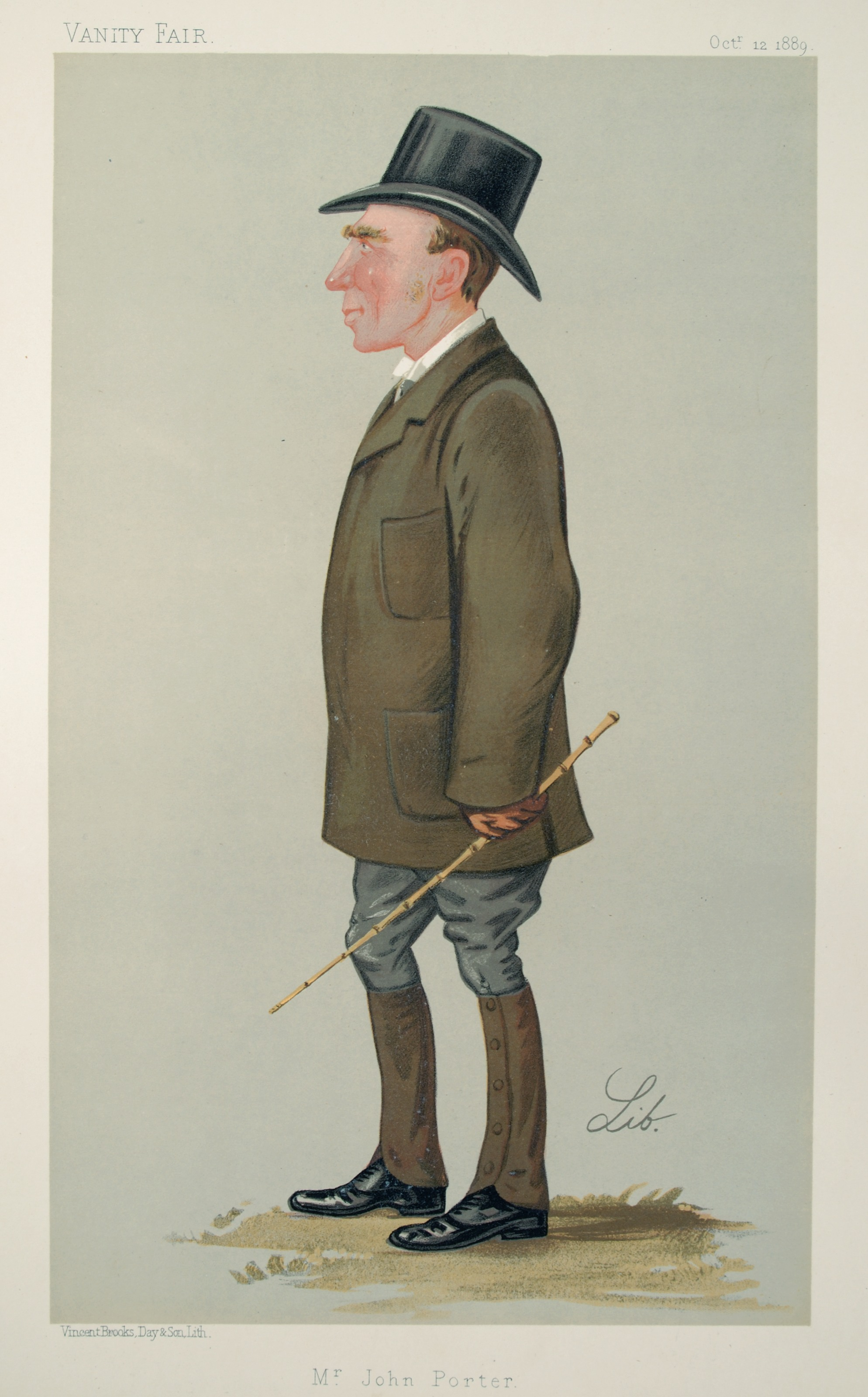
John Porter, La Fleche's trainer in 1891-2

La Fleche won all four of her races as a two-year-old. She made her first appearance on 16 July at Newmarket in the Chesterfield Stakes, for which she started 6/4 favourite. Although she had not grown as much as might have been expected from her yearling days, she was reported to be deceptively powerful, being described by one observer as "all wire and whipcord." Ridden by George Barrett, she led from the start and shook off her rivals "without an effort" to win by two lengths, in an impressive time of 1:04.2. The third-placed finisher, a colt named Bonavista, went on to win the following year's 2000 Guineas. On 29 July, La Fleche was sent to Goodwood for the five furlong Lavant Stakes in which she met Priestess, another filly whose sale price (£4,000) had attracted comment. La Fleche tracked Priestess, who set a strong pace, before moving ahead in the final furlong to win "very cleverly" by a length. Two days later, she reappeared at the same course for the Molecomb Stakes and recorded another easy win, beating Adoration by one and a half lengths. At Doncaster in September she won the Champagne Stakes to take her earnings for the year to £3,415.

La Fleche's stable companion, Orme, was regarded as the best of the year's two-year-old colts, and there was speculation as to which of the two was the better. It was also generally believed that La Fleche would have the Derby as her principal target for the following year.

=== 1892: three-year-old season ===
==== Spring ====
1892 began with a scare for La Fleche's owners as the filly slipped and injured her knees at her stable. Initial fears that her career could be over however, proved to be unfounded as the damage was superficial. Confidence in the filly grew steadily over the winter and early spring, and by late April she had supplanted Orme as Derby favourite. Her position at the head of the market was strengthened when Orme was poisoned– unsubstantiated rumours blamed the filly's supporters– and ruled out for the first half of the season.

On 6 May 1892 La Fleche started 1/2 favourite in a field of seven for the 1000 Guineas. Her price might have been even shorter but for fears that she too could have been "got at". Ridden by George Barrett she raced in second place as Adoration set the pace before moving easily into the lead a furlong out. She won by a length from The Smew and Adoration in a time of 1:52.4, which was 1.6 seconds faster than the time recorded by Bona Vista in winning the 2000 Guineas over the same course.

==== Summer ====
At Epsom on 1 June La Fleche started 11/10 favourite for the Derby on a "gloriously fine" day. She was saddled and paraded separately from the colts for reasons that correspondents chose not to particularise. The French-trained colt Bucentaur led the field into the straight where he was overtaken by the 40/1 outsider Sir Hugo. La Fleche then produced her challenge but after a "splendid finish" in which she was cheered on by the crowd, she failed to overhaul the colt and finished second, beaten three quarters of a length. There were later claims that La Fleche's defeat had been a fluke and Barrett was criticised for giving her a "most erratic ride". This version of events is not supported by contemporary accounts, which state that the filly was in a "capital position" throughout the race.

Two days after her defeat in the Derby, La Fleche ran against fillies in the Oaks. Although some regarded her as a certainty, her odds drifted from 2/5 to 8/11 before the start. In the race she tracked the leader Broad Corrie before taking the lead in the straight apparently poised for an easy victory. In the final furlong however, she was closely pressed by The Smew, a filly she had dealt with easily in the 1000 Guineas, and Barrett had to ride a vigorous finish to win the race by a short head. On 29 July at Goodwood, La Fleche won the Nassau Stakes in which, despite looking less than fully fit, she quickened impressively to bear Broad Corrie by a length and a half.

==== Autumn ====
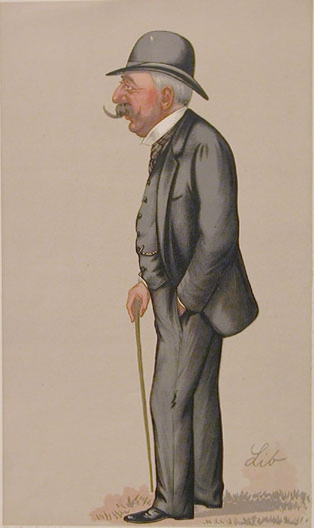
Maurice de Hirsch, La Fleche's owner

On 7 September La Fleche ran in the St Leger on a wet day at Doncaster. Orme, who had returned from his problems to win the Eclipse Stakes started favourite, with La Fleche, ridden on this occasion by John Watts, strongly supported at 7/2. Watts settled the filly in the early stages as Orme set off in front. Just after the turn into the straight, La Fleche, travelling strongly, moved alongside her stable companion and then pulled clear. She won easily by two lengths from the fast-finishing Sir Hugo, with Orme fading into fifth. On 24 September, La Fleche ran against older and younger horses in the £10,000 Lancashire Plate over one mile at Manchester Racecourse. Ridden by Barrett, she tracked the leaders until the straight, where she accelerated impressively to win by three lengths from Orvieto, with Sir Hugo unplaced.

At Newmarket five days later she faced only one opponent, a colt called Dunure, in the Grand Duke Michael Stakes. She started at odds of 1/40 and won the £1,000 prize in a predictable canter. In the Newmarket Oaks on 11 October she ran lazily but won very easily by a length from Golconda, to whom she was conceding nineteen pounds.

She was then sent for the Cambridgeshire Handicap 26 October, for which she was assigned a weight of 122 pounds. La Fleche started 7/2 favourite in a field of thirty runners and was ridden by Barrett. The closing stages of the nine furlong race developed into a contest between La Fleche and Pensioner, a colt who was carrying only 88 pounds. The filly showed "fire and resolution" at the finish to pull away from the colt and win by one and a half lengths. The win took her earnings for the season to £23,848, all of which was donated to charity by Hirsch.

At the end of the season La Fleche, and all of Maurice de Hirsch's other horses were moved from the yard of John Porter to that of Richard Marsh. The move followed a disagreement between Hirsch's racing manager, Marcus Beresford, and another of Porter's important patrons, the Duke of Westminster

=== 1893: four-year-old season ===
In early 1893, La Fleche was reported to be wonderfully "fresh and well" although she showed no signs of having grown. She did not appear in public however, until 14 July, when she ran in the Eclipse Stakes at Sandown. She started evens favourite against five opponents, most notably Orme, who started on 2/1. Barrett moved the filly up to challenge in the straight, but she soon came under pressure and although she ran on "gamely" she could finish only third behind Orme and Medicis. Two weeks later at Goodwood, Orme again proved superior, beating the filly by a neck in the Gordon Stakes, despite veering sharply left inside the last furlong.

In Autumn La Fleche attempted to win a second Lancashire Plate, but finished third to the three-year-colts Raeburn, and Isinglass. The race had been expected to lie between La Fleche and Isinglass, and their respective jockeys focused their attentions on each other, allowing Raeburn to emerge almost unseen to take the race in the closing stages. For this race, La Fleche carried a weight of 154 pounds. On 25 October she found a weight of 133 pound too much when finishing unplaced in the Cambridgeshire. She won the Lowther Stakes at Newmarket in October. On 10 November she ran in the Liverpool Autumn Cup, carrying a weight of 132 pounds and won in impressive style by one and a quarter lengths from The Prisoner. Later in November, she was beaten under 137 pounds in the Manchester November Handicap.

=== 1894: five-year-old season ===
Before the start of the 1894 season, La Fleche was covered by the Gold Cup winner Morion, and raced in foal (pregnant) for the rest of the year. At Royal Ascot on 15 June she started 2/5 favourite for the two and a half mile Ascot Gold Cup, in which her biggest danger appeared to be the French colt Callistrate. Watts held the mare up at the back of the field before moving her up to challenge Callistrate entering the straight. She soon went clear and won "in splendid style" by three lengths. One day later she ran in the Hardwicke Stakes and started the 1/5 favourite. In the straight however, she was never able to get on terms with the colt Ravensbury, and finished second, beaten half a length. The Prince of Wales reportedly lost heavily on the race.

On her final start of the year she met Ravensbury again in the Champion Stakes at Newmarket on 9 October. As the owners of Isinglass had turned down a challenge to run his horse against La Fleche, they were the only two runners and the mare, ridden by Watts started at odds of 1/3. La Fleche opened up a clear lead in the early stages and was never in danger of defeat, winning "in a canter" by eight lengths. As the mare galloped up the hill with her ears pricked, she was given an enthusiastic reception from the Newmarket crowd who knew they were witnessing her final race.

== Assessment ==
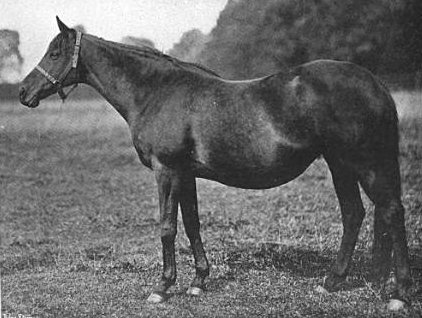
La Fleche as a broodmare in 1903.

After her win in the St Leger, La Fleche was described as "one of the best fillies that ever raced in England." Her earnings of £25,635 were by far the highest for any horse in 1892 and by the end of her second season, she had already earned more in prize money than any other filly. On her retirement it was said that she had been "nothing short of an Idol" with the public.

== Breeding record ==
As noted above, La Fleche was already in foal when racing in 1894 and produced her first foal, a filly called La Veine by Morion in 1895. In 1896 Maurice de Hirsch died and all his bloodstock, including La Fleche and La Veine were put up for auction. She was sold for £12,600 to Marcus Beresford, acting on this occasion on behalf the Sykes family and was sent to their Sledmere Stud in Yorkshire. Sir Tatton Sykes, who was reportedly horrified by the price, initially refused to acknowledge the mare's arrival, and left her in a railway box for two weeks before he was persuaded to accept the deal. La Fleche's best runner was John O’Gaunt, who finished second in the Derby and sired Swynford. Her daughter Baroness La Fleche, by Ladas, produced the 1000 Guineas winner Cinna, who in turn produced the successful stallion Beau Pere. La Fleche was retired from breeding in 1911, and she died at Sledmere in late April 1916 at the age of twenty-seven.

== Pedigree ==
Pedigree of La Fleche (GB), brown mare, 1889
Sire St. Simon (GB) 1881	Galopin; 1872	Vedette	Voltigeur
Sire St. Simon (GB) 1881	Galopin; 1872	Vedette	Mrs Ridgway
Sire St. Simon (GB) 1881	Galopin; 1872	Flying Duchess	The Flying Dutchman
Sire St. Simon (GB) 1881	Galopin; 1872	Flying Duchess	Merope
Sire St. Simon (GB) 1881	St Angela; 1865	King Tom	Harkaway
Sire St. Simon (GB) 1881	St Angela; 1865	King Tom	Pocahontas
Sire St. Simon (GB) 1881	St Angela; 1865	Adeline	Ion
Sire St. Simon (GB) 1881	St Angela; 1865	Adeline	Little Fairy
Dam Quiver (GB) 1872	Toxophilite; 1855	Longbow	Ithuriel
Dam Quiver (GB) 1872	Toxophilite; 1855	Longbow	Miss Bowe
Dam Quiver (GB) 1872	Toxophilite; 1855	Legerdemain	Pantaloon
Dam Quiver (GB) 1872	Toxophilite; 1855	Legerdemain	Decoy
Dam Quiver (GB) 1872	Young Melbourne mare 1861	Young Melbourne	Melbourne
Dam Quiver (GB) 1872	Young Melbourne mare 1861	Young Melbourne	Clarissa
Dam Quiver (GB) 1872	Young Melbourne mare 1861	Brown Bess	Camel
Dam Quiver (GB) 1872	Young Melbourne mare 1861	Brown Bess	Brutandorf mare (Family: 3-e)
