= Laflèche (surname) =

Laflèche is a French surname. Notable people with the surname include:

- François-Joseph Laflèche, (1879–1945), Canadian politician
- Léo Richer Laflèche (1888–1956), Canadian general, civil servant, diplomat, and politician
- Louis-François Richer Laflèche (1818–1898), Canadian Catholic bishop
