= John Porter (horseman) =

English racing trainer (1838–1922)

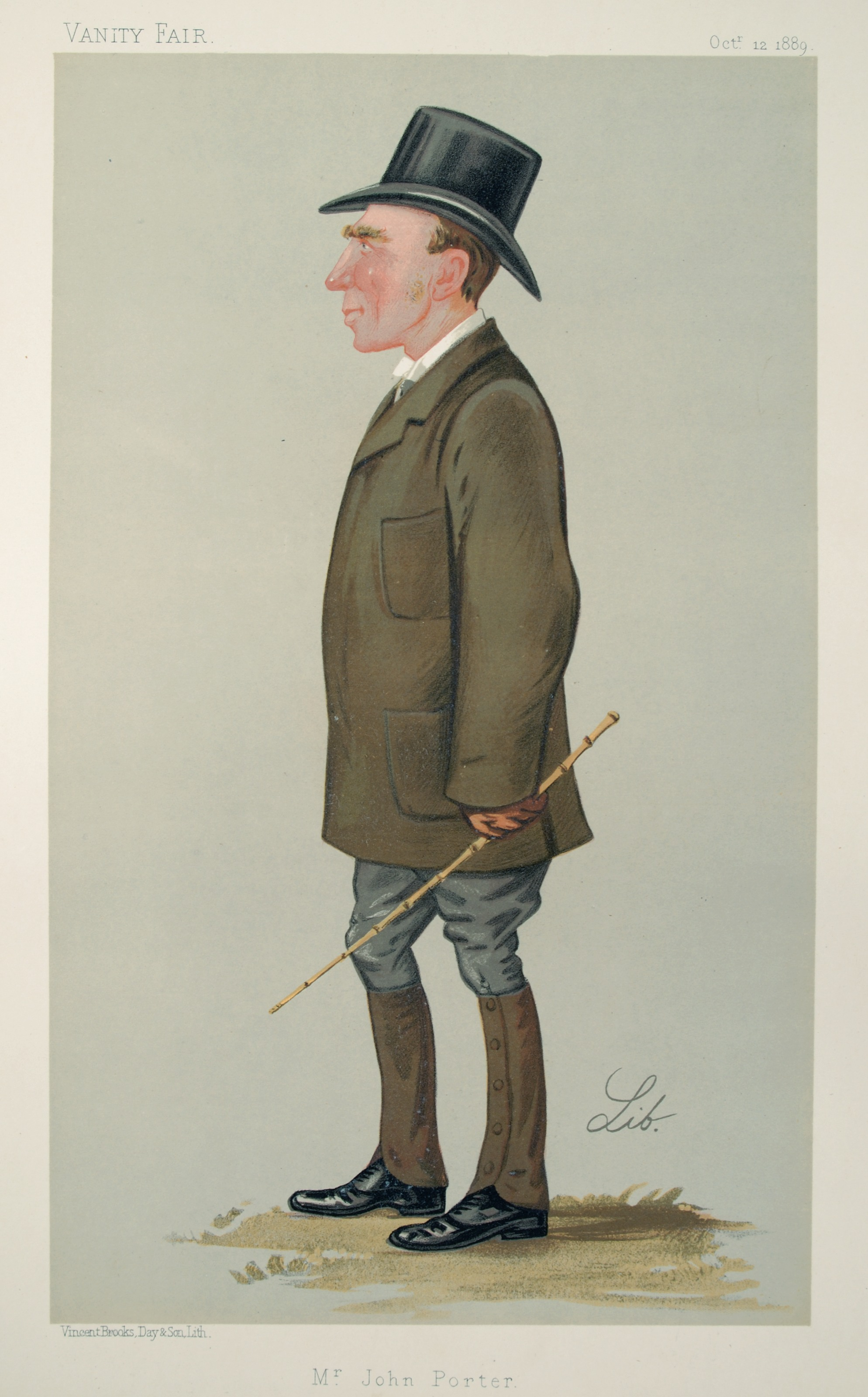
- As depicted by Liborio Prosperi in Vanity Fair, 12 October 1889

Personal information
- Born: 2 March 1838 Rugeley, Staffordshire, England
- Died: 21 February 1922 (aged 83)
- Occupation: Racehorse trainer

Horse racing career
- Sport: Horse racing
- Career wins: 1863 to 1905; Races won: 1063; Prize Money won: £787,583 (win & place)

Major racing wins
- Middle Park Plate (1867, 1868, 1887, 1891); Epsom Derby (1868, 1882, 1883, 1886, 1890, 1891, 1899); Ascot Gold Cup (1868, 1879, 1880, 1902); St Leger Stakes (1869, 1886, 1891, 1892, 1894, 1899); 2000 Guineas (1882, 1885, 1886, 1891, 1899); Epsom Oaks (1882, 1892, 1900); Coronation Stakes (1884, 1894, 1896); Dewhurst Plate (1884, 1885, 1887, 1891, 1893, 1896, 1897, 1898); 1000 Guineas (1885, 1892); Grand Prix de Paris (1885); Champion Stakes (1885, 1886, 1888, 1891, 1892, 1896); Hardwicke Stakes (1886, 1887, 1896, 1898); Prince of Wales's Stakes (1888, 1892, 1895, 1896, 1899, 1900, 1904, 1905); Eclipse Stakes (1888, 1892, 1893, 1899, 1904); Lancashire Plate (1892)

Significant horses
- Blue Gown, Pero Gomez, Isonomy, Shotover, Geheimniss, Paradox, Ormonde, Orbit, Friar's Balsam, Common, Orme, La Fleche, Flying Fox, William the Third, Darley Dale

John Porter (2 March 1838 – 21 February 1922) was an English Thoroughbred flat racing trainer whose horses won the English Triple Crown three times. He was described by the National Horseracing Museum as "undoubtedly the most successful trainer of the Victorian era."

He was also the founder of Newbury Racecourse in Berkshire, England.

== Early life ==
Orme, the Duke of Westminster's racehorse, by Holland Tringham, Kingsclere. Illustrated London News, May 1892.

John Porter's Park House, Kingsclere, by Holland Tringham, in Illustrated London News, May 1892.

John Porter as shown in the Illustrated London News, May 28, 1892.

John Porter was born in Rugeley, Staffordshire on 2 March 1838. His father was a tailor and his mother a dressmaker. He left school in 1852, as his father was eager for him to join the legal profession. However, Porter visited John Day’s stables while on holiday and was impressed with what he saw.

In 1853 John Porter (aged 15) was apprenticed to John Day, who trained racehorses principally for lawyer Henry Padwick, at Michel Grove, near Worthing, Sussex. The stable moved to Findon, Sussex in 1857.

Soon after the move, John Day left Findon after a disagreement with Mr Padwick, and Porter's apprenticeship was terminated. He stayed at Findon under William Goater, who took over the trainer's licence. He became secretary and in many ways manager of the establishment on behalf of Mr Padwick.

== Training career ==
Porter was given his first chance to train by Sir Joseph Hawley, who built the Kingsclere, Hampshire training establishment, near Newbury. During his career Porter also trained for King George V, the Duke of Westminster, The Duke of Portland, the Earl of Crewe and Earl of Portsmouth.

In his will Sir Joseph gave Porter the opportunity to buy the Kingsclere estate at a price which he could afford, which Porter did.

As trainer, and then owner of Kingsclere, Porter trained horses that won twenty three of the British Classic Races, including seven in England's most prestigious race, The Derby. His Triple Crown wins came with Ormonde (1886), Common (1891), and Flying Fox (1899).

== Retirement and honours ==
John Porter retired from racing in 1905. The John Porter Stakes at Newbury Racecourse is a one and a half-mile race for older horses named in his honour. This was run for the first time on 29 September 1928, six years after his death and takes place today during the April meeting.

== John Porter and Newbury Racecourse ==
Porter was also a founder of Newbury Racecourse and served as its managing director.

During 1903 and 1904, John Porter went to the Jockey Club several times with his proposals for a new racecourse at Newbury. He thought that Newbury's easily accessible location and proximity to other popular establishments in the area would make it an ideal place for a new racecourse. The Jockey Club rejected these proposals several times, stating that there were already enough racecourses in the country.

However, a chance meeting between Porter and King Edward VII changed everything. The King showed his interest in the proposal and the Jockey Club eventually issued a license. Porter was then able to go ahead. If it had not been for this chance meeting with the King, Newbury Racecourse would not be here today!

The Newbury Racecourse Company was formed on 26 April 1904. The first meeting of the directors was held at the registered offices in London a few days later, with John Porter in the chair. They purchased the land and began construction of the racecourse building and stables-they were given only 9 months to build the racecourse and buildings from scratch!

The first race meeting to be held at Newbury was over the 26 and 27 September 1905. Porter trained Zelis to win the Regulation Plate. This was his first and only win at Newbury as he retired at the end of the 1905 season.
