= French gunboat Flèche (1855) =

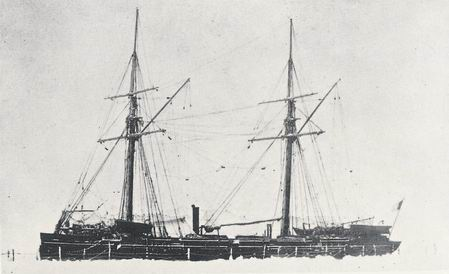
- Portrait of Flèche

History

France
- Name: Flèche
- Namesake: Arrow
- Builder: Toulon
- Laid down: December 1854
- Launched: 10 June 1855
- Commissioned: June 1855
- Stricken: 11 February 1865
- Fate: Broken up in 1882

General characteristics
- Class & type: Étincelle-class gunboat
- Tons burthen: 350 tonnes
- Length: 43.9 m (144 ft 0 in)
- Beam: 7.8 m (25 ft 7 in)
- Draught: 3.2 m (10 ft 6 in)
- Propulsion: Sail; Creusot steam engine
- Complement: 78
- Armament: 4 × 50-pounder guns; 20 × rifled guns
- Armour: Timber

Flèche was an Étincelle-class gunboat of the French Navy. She served in the Crimean War before being used for hydrographic surveys and eventually as a coal hulk at Brest.

== Career ==
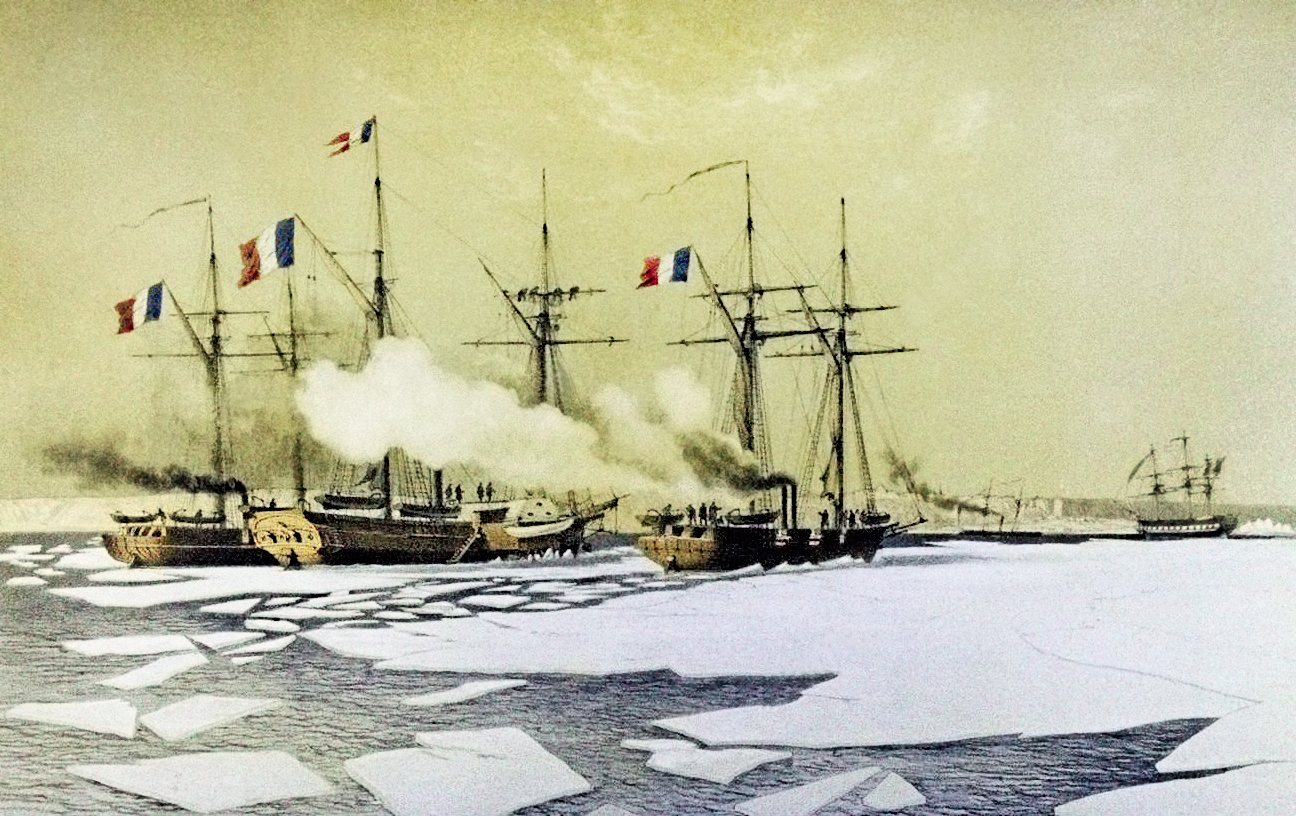
Flèche, icebreaking in the Dnieper Liman for the passage of Floating batteries

Flèche took part in the Battle of Kinburn in 1855. She served in the Adriatic Sea from 1859, and in Mexico from 1863.

She conducted hydrographic surveys off Brest from 1864. In 1877, she was hulked and used as a coal depot in Brest until 1862, when she was broken up.
