= Bend Or =

British-bred Thoroughbred racehorse

- Painted by Emil Adam
- Sire: Doncaster
- Grandsire: Stockwell
- Dam: Rouge Rose
- Damsire: Thormanby
- Sex: Stallion
- Foaled: 1877
- Died: 1903 (aged 25–26)
- Country: United Kingdom of Great Britain and Ireland
- Colour: Chestnut
- Breeder: Eaton Stud
- Owner: 1st Duke of Westminster
- Trainer: Robert Peck
- Record: 14: 10–2–0
- Earnings: £16,466

Major wins
- Chesterfield Stakes (1879); Richmond Stakes (1879); Epsom Derby (1880); St. James's Palace Stakes (1880); City and Suburban Handicap (1881); Epsom Gold Cup (1881); Champion Stakes (1881)

Awards
- Leading broodmare sire in Britain & Ireland (1901, 1902)
- Last updated on 6 November 2009

Bend Or (1877–1903) was a British Thoroughbred racehorse who won the 1880 Epsom Derby. His regular jockey Fred Archer, winner of thirteen consecutive British jockey titles, said Bend Or was probably the greatest horse he had ever ridden.

== Nomenclature ==
Azure, a bend or, the ancient Grosvenor arms before the 1389 lawsuit Scrope v Grosvenor

His name is the heraldic term for "a bend (i.e. diagonal stripe) that is golden or yellow in color (or)", and is a reference to the ancient former arms of the Grosvenor family which were adjudged against them in 1389 to the Scrope family in the most famous case ever heard before the Court of Chivalry, known as Scrope v Grosvenor. The Duke also awarded it as a lifelong family nickname to his grandson Hugh Grosvenor, 2nd Duke of Westminster (1879–1953), born in the year before the Derby win. Bendor Range is named after the horse.

== Breeding ==
Bred and foaled at the 1st Duke of Westminster's Eaton Stud, Bend Or grew to be a large stallion but was noted for his unusual docility. He was a chestnut colt who stood 16.1 hands (65 inches, 165 cm) and had a white blaze. He was sired by Doncaster, a son of Stockwell, out of the mare, Rouge Rose by Thormanby. Thormanby won the 1860 Epsom Derby and the 1861 Ascot Gold Cup and was in 1869 the leading sire in Great Britain & Ireland.

== Racing career ==
=== 1879: Two-year-old Season ===
Bend Or made his first racecourse appearance in July 1879 in the Chesterfield Stakes at Newmarket. Starting as the 9/4 favourite he won easily by a length. He then won the Richmond Stakes carrying a 6-pound weight penalty. After these wins he started to 1/2 favourite for the Prince of Wales Stakes at York. He led from the outset and won easily by half a length. After York he was already being quoted at 7/1 for the 1880 Epsom Derby. Bend Or finished the season by winning the Triennial Produce Stakes and the Rous Memorial Stakes, both at Newmarket.

=== 1880:Three-year-old Season ===
==== The Derby ====
Bend Or was not entered for the 2000 Guineas, but in early March, he was the 5/1 favourite for The Derby. He started his three-year-old campaign in the Derby. He was ridden by Fred Archer and started as the 2/1 favourite in a field of 19. After the start, he was in a prominent position but was dropped back into mid-division by Archer. At Tattenham Corner Robert the Devil was leading from Von der Tann, Bend Or being in about the sixth position. In the straight Bend Or passed some of the horses to move into third. The second placed Mask then began to fade as he was passed by Bend Or, who went off in pursuit of Robert the Devil. Bend Or won the Derby by a head from Robert the Devil, with Mask a further six lengths back in third.

==== St. James's Palace Stakes ====
After the Derby, he went to Royal Ascot for the St. James's Palace Stakes, starting at the odds of 30/100. The race was run at a slow early pace. Bend Or won by a head from Fernandez, the two finishing clear of the rest of the field. After Ascot he had to be given a few months rest due to shin problems exacerbated in his Derby win.

==== Challenge to Pedigree ====
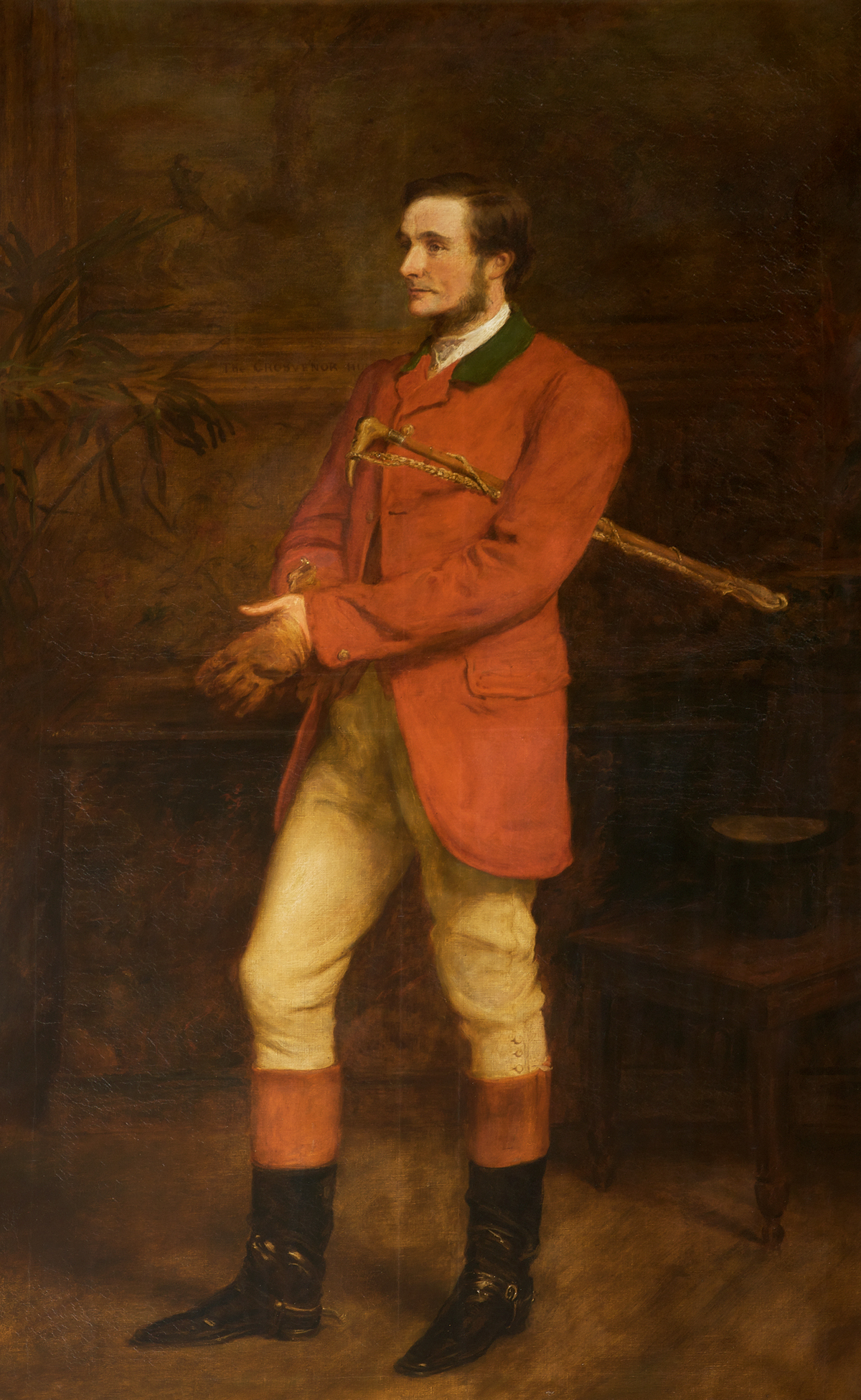
Hugh Grosvenor (1st Duke of Westminster), the owner of Bend Or

In the summer a challenge was lodged by the owners of Robert the Devil against Bend Or's Derby win on the grounds of him being entered under the wrong description. It was alleged that his dam was not Rouge Rose, but a mare called Clemence. At Eaton Stud, both Rouge Rose and Clemence had a foal by Doncaster in 1877. It was suggested that the two foals had been mixed up and that it was the horse registered as Tadcaster (i.e. the Clemence foal) that won the Derby. The accusation came from a groom who formerly worked for the Duke. During the investigation, the Eaton Stud book was produced, but was found to contain a number of errors. The objection was overruled by the Jockey Club, but controversy remained. Recent research which compared DNA of Bend Or to that of Tadcaster relatives suggested the two had indeed been switched as foals.

Clemence was a daughter of Newminster and Eulogy. Newminster was the son of Touchstone and Beeswing. Eulogy was the daughter of Euclid and Martha Lynn.

==== The Autumn ====
The shin injury affected him for most of the remainder of the year as was evident in his first loss when he returned to racing for September's St Leger Stakes, where he finished fifth behind winner Robert the Devil. His next start came in the Great Foal Stakes. In that race, Robert the Devil made the running, with Bend Or held up in the rear. At the bushes, Bend Or moved up to third behind Robert the Devil and Muriel. Bend Or then overtook Muriel and challenged Robert the Devil. Bend Or seemed to have the race won with 50 yards to go, but he swerved badly and lost by a head. He faced Robert the Devil again in the Champion Stakes. Robert the Devil started the 11/10 favourite, with Bend Or at 5/4. Robert the Devil led from the start and was never caught. He won by 10 lengths from Bend Or, with the other two runners a further 10 lengths back.

=== 1881: Four-year-old Season ===
Returning to the track at age four, Bend Or won the City and Suburban Handicap at Epsom Downs carrying 9 stone. He then avenged his defeats to Robert the Devil in the Epsom Gold Cup. Only the two horses ran, with Bend Or winning by a neck. Bend Or then won the Champion Stakes easily by ¾ length from Scobell, with the 1881 Derby winner Iroquois a bad third. Bend Or's next start came in the Cambridgeshire Stakes where, under Archer, he carried 9 st 8 lb. During the closing stages the weight began to tell and he was eased by Archer, finishing in seventh. He was then retired to breeding duties at his owner's Eaton Stud.

== Race record ==
Date	Race name	D(f)	Course	Prize (£)	Odds	Runners	Place	Margin	Winner/Runner-up	Time	Jockey
July 1879	Chesterfield Stakes	5	Newmarket	1130	9/4	11	1	1	Petal	0:59	Charles Wood
29 July 1879	Richmond Stakes	6	Goodwood	1762		8	1				
August 1879	Prince of Wales Stakes	5	York	340	1/2	9	1	0.5	Brother to Ersilia		Fred Archer
1879	Triennial Produce Stakes	10	Newmarket	881		11	1				
1879	Rous Memorial Stakes	5	Newmarket	567		10	1				
26 May 1880	Epsom Derby	12	Epsom Downs	6375	2/1	19	1	Head	Robert the Devil	2:48	Fred Archer
June 1880	St. James's Palace Stakes	8	Ascot	1550	30/100	5	1	Head	Fernandez		G Fordham
15 September 1880	St Leger	14.5	Doncaster	6100	4/5	12	6		Robert the Devil	3:32	
28 September 1880	Great Foal Stakes	10	Newmarket	2697	9/2	7	2	Head	Robert the Devil	2:25	Tom Cannon
14 October 1880	Champion Stakes	10	Newmarket	2071	5/4	4	2	10	Robert the Devil	2:10	G Fordham
27 April 1881	City and Suburban Handicap	10	Epsom Downs	1230	100/8	24	1	1.5	Foxhall	2:07	Fred Archer
3 June 1881	Epsom Gold Cup	12	Epsom Downs	500		2	1		Robert the Devil		
13 October 1881	Champion Stakes	10	Newmarket	2087	4/6	8	1	0.75	Scobell	2:23.6	Fred Archer
25 October 1881	Cambridgeshire Stakes	9	Newmarket	2017	9/2	32	7		Foxhall	2:15.4	Fred Archer

== Stud record ==
Bend Or had white flecks on his chestnut coat, and like his damsire Thormanby, had black spots on his neck, shoulder, and on his quarters. These markings often showed up in his progeny and is referred to as Bend Or spotting.

Standing at Eaton Stud, Bend Or was a successful stallion siring many top racehorses including two classic winners. His stud fee for 1898 was 200 guineas, plus one guinea for the groom. By this time his offspring had won 285 races worth £129,148

=== Notable progeny ===
c = colt, f = filly

Foaled	Name	Sex	Dam	Major Wins
1883	Kendal	c	Windermere	July Stakes
1883	Ormonde	c	Lily Agnes	Dewhurst Stakes, 2000 Guineas, Epsom Derby, St. James's Palace Stakes, Hardwicke Stakes (twice), St Leger Stakes, Great Foal Stakes, Champion Stakes, Rous Memorial Stakes, Imperial Gold Cup
1885	Orbit	c	Fair Alice	Eclipse Stakes
1885	Ossory	c	Lily Agnes	Prince of Wales's Stakes, St. James's Palace Stakes, Great Yorkshire Stakes
1887	Martagon	c	Tiger Lily	Goodwood Cup
1888	Orion	c	Shotover	Champion Stakes
1888	Orvieto	c	Napoli	Sussex Stakes
1889	Bona Vista	c	Vista	2000 Guineas
1892	Laveno	c	Napoli	Champion Stakes
1897	Lord Bobs	c	Silver Sea	Dewhurst Stakes, July Cup
1902	Rouge Croix	c	Dame Agneta	Dewhurst Stakes
1903	Radium	c	Taia	Goodwood Cup, Doncaster Cup

Kendal went on to sire Triple Crown winner Galtee More. Ormonde sired dual Eclipse Stakes winner Orme. Orbit was exported to Argentina. Such was his success at stud there he was known as "South American Stockwell". Bona Vista went on to sire Ascot Gold Cup winner Cyllene. Through Cyllene's grandson Phalaris, Bend Or is the sire-line ancestor to the majority of thoroughbreds alive today. Radium sired 2000 Guineas winner Clarissimus.

Bend Or did not produce many top race mares, but many of them were top broodmares. His daughter Fairy Gold was exported to America and was the dam of Fair Play and Belmont Stakes winner Friar Rock. Another daughter Ornament was the dam of Sceptre, winner of four classics in 1902. Disorder was produced Eclipse Stakes winner Epsom Lad. Bend Or was also damsire to Prix du Jockey Club winner Ex Voto, through is daughter Golden Rod. Through his daughter Quetta, Bend Or was damsire to Coronation Stakes winner Helm and Dewhurst Stakes winner Frontier (who was sired by his grandson Orme).

Bend Or was twice the leading broodmare sire in Britain before his death at age twenty-six in January 1903. Bend Or's important immediate descendants include The Tetrarch, Phar Lap and Man o' War, and beyond that the American horse Seabiscuit.

== Pedigree ==
Pedigree of Bend Or, chestnut stallion, 1877
Sire Doncaster ch. 1870	Stockwell ch. 1849	The Baron ch. 1842	Birdcatcher
Sire Doncaster ch. 1870	Stockwell ch. 1849	The Baron ch. 1842	Echidna
Sire Doncaster ch. 1870	Stockwell ch. 1849	Pocahontas b. 1837	Glencoe
Sire Doncaster ch. 1870	Stockwell ch. 1849	Pocahontas b. 1837	Marpessa
Sire Doncaster ch. 1870	Marigold ch. 1860	Teddington br. 1848	Orlando
Sire Doncaster ch. 1870	Marigold ch. 1860	Teddington br. 1848	Miss Twickenham
Sire Doncaster ch. 1870	Marigold ch. 1860	Ratan mare b. 1852	Ratan
Sire Doncaster ch. 1870	Marigold ch. 1860	Ratan mare b. 1852	Melbourne mare
Dam Rouge Rose ch. 1865	Thormanby ch. 1857	Windhound br. 1847	Pantaloon
Dam Rouge Rose ch. 1865	Thormanby ch. 1857	Windhound br. 1847	Phayne
Dam Rouge Rose ch. 1865	Thormanby ch. 1857	Alice Hawthorn b. 1838	Muley Moloch
Dam Rouge Rose ch. 1865	Thormanby ch. 1857	Alice Hawthorn b. 1838	Rebecca
Dam Rouge Rose ch. 1865	Ellen Horne br. 1844	Redshank b. 1833	Sandbeck
Dam Rouge Rose ch. 1865	Ellen Horne br. 1844	Redshank b. 1833	Johanna
Dam Rouge Rose ch. 1865	Ellen Horne br. 1844	Delhi; 1838	Plenipotentiary
Dam Rouge Rose ch. 1865	Ellen Horne br. 1844	Delhi; 1838	Pawn Junior

Note: b. = Bay, br. = Brown, ch. = Chestnut

== See also ==
- List of racehorses
