= Doncaster (horse) =

British-bred Thoroughbred racehorse

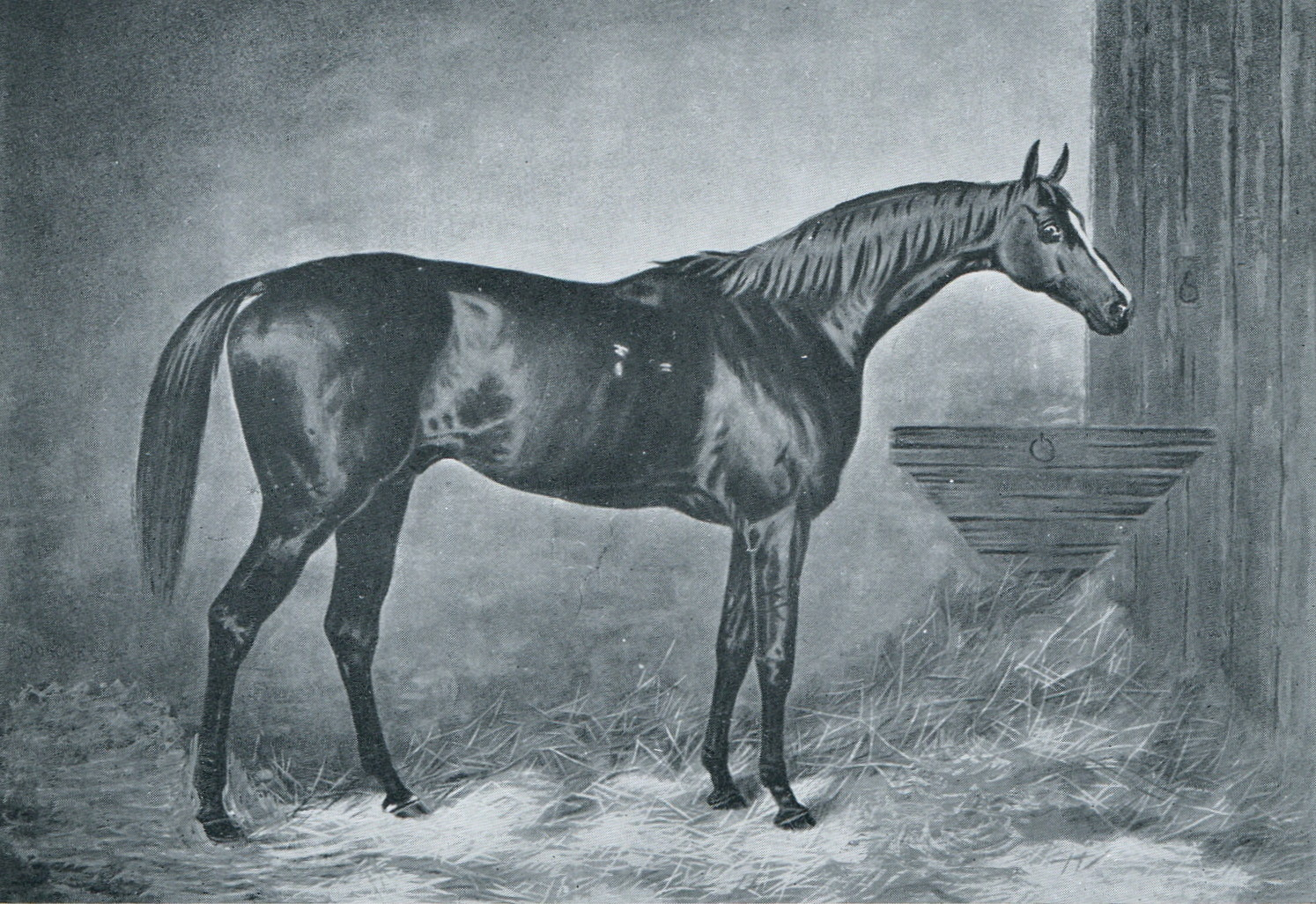
- Sire: Stockwell
- Grandsire: The Baron
- Dam: Marigold (1860)
- Damsire: Teddington
- Sex: Stallion
- Foaled: 1870
- Died: January 1892 (aged 21–22)
- Country: United Kingdom of Great Britain and Ireland
- Colour: Chestnut
- Breeder: Sir Tatton Sykes
- Owner: James Merry; Robert Peck; Hugh Grosvenor, 1st Duke of Westminster
- Trainer: Robert Peck
- Record: 10: 4 wins
- Earnings: £4,825 (for the Derby)

Major wins
- Epsom Derby (1873); Goodwood Cup (1874); Ascot Gold Cup (1875); Alexandra Plate (1875)
- Last updated on 21 February 2011

Doncaster (1870 – January 1892) was an English Thoroughbred racehorse and sire. He was the winner of the 1873 Epsom Derby and the sire of the great stallion Bend Or. Through Bend Or he is the direct male-line ancestor of most modern thoroughbreds.

== Breeding ==
Doncaster was foaled at the Sledmere Stud, Yorkshire, Great Britain and was sired by "The Emperor of Stallions", Stockwell, who had won both the 2,000 Guineas and the St. Leger Stakes; Stockwell was a leading sire during his later years, producing many classic winners. Doncaster's dam Marigold had a fairly good career on the track, and was sired by The Derby winner Teddington.

Doncaster, a chestnut with a white blaze originally named "All Heart and No Peel", was raised at the Sledmere Stud before he was sent to the Tattersalls auction. James Merry bought the colt for 950 guineas, changed his name to Doncaster (after the racecourse), and sent him to trainer Robert Peck.

== Racing career ==
The colt did not compete as a two-year-old, partially due to a kick to the stifle. Doncaster began racing as a three-year-old, first appearing at the 2,000 Guineas (where he was unplaced to winner Gang Forward). He won his next race (the Derby) easily. He then raced in the Grand Prix de Paris, finishing third to winner Boiard, before being beaten by a head at the St. Leger. He did not do well in his next run, the Grand Duke Michael Stakes, but finished his season second in the Newmarket Derby.

His four-year-old career was respectable, with a dead heat second place with Flageolet in the Ascot Gold Cup (won by Boiard), before a win at the Goodwood Cup. As a five-year-old, he won both the Ascot Gold Cup and the Alexandra Plate; the races were two days apart.

== At stud ==
Doncaster was then retired. Peck purchased him for £10,000 and immediately sold the stallion to the Duke of Westminster (for whom he was also a trainer) for £14,000. The Duke had been searching for a stallion prospect, with a good pedigree and racing record, to stand at his Eaton Stud in Cheshire. Doncaster was bred to the mare Lily Agnes (by Macaroni), who produced the filly Farewell, a 1,000 Guineas winner. Doncaster's most famous son was Bend Or, the Derby winner and prolific sire. Noted offspring were:

Foaled	Name	Sex	Major Wins/Achievements
1877	Bend Or	Stallion	Epsom Derby (1880), Leading broodmare sire in Great Britain and Ireland (1901, 1902)
	Cambusmore		
	Farewell	Mare	1000 Guineas Stakes
	Muncaster	Stallion	
	Sandiway	Mare	Coronation Stakes
	Sir Reuben	Stallion	

Empress Elisabeth of Austria saw Doncaster while visiting Eaton, and reportedly fell in love with him. She eventually purchased him, for £5,000, and he lived at her Kisber Stud until his death at the age of 22 in January 1892. His blood lives on through his son, Bend Or.

== Pedigree ==
Pedigree of Doncaster chestnut stallion, 1870
Sire Stockwell Ch. 1849	The Baron; Ch. 1842	Birdcatcher	Sir Hercules
Sire Stockwell Ch. 1849	The Baron; Ch. 1842	Birdcatcher	Guiccioli
Sire Stockwell Ch. 1849	The Baron; Ch. 1842	Echidna	Economist
Sire Stockwell Ch. 1849	The Baron; Ch. 1842	Echidna	Miss Pratt
Sire Stockwell Ch. 1849	Pocahontas; B. 1837	Glencoe	Sultan
Sire Stockwell Ch. 1849	Pocahontas; B. 1837	Glencoe	Trampoline
Sire Stockwell Ch. 1849	Pocahontas; B. 1837	Marpessa	Muley
Sire Stockwell Ch. 1849	Pocahontas; B. 1837	Marpessa	Clare
Dam Marigold Ch. 1860	Teddington; 1848	Orlando	Touchstone
Dam Marigold Ch. 1860	Teddington; 1848	Orlando	Vulture
Dam Marigold Ch. 1860	Teddington; 1848	Miss Twickenham	Rockingham
Dam Marigold Ch. 1860	Teddington; 1848	Miss Twickenham	Electress
Dam Marigold Ch. 1860	Ratan mare	Ratan	Buzzard
Dam Marigold Ch. 1860	Ratan mare	Ratan	Picton Mare
Dam Marigold Ch. 1860	Ratan mare	Melbourne Mare	Melbourne
Dam Marigold Ch. 1860	Ratan mare	Melbourne Mare	Lisbeth (Family 5-e)

== See also ==
- List of racehorses
- Bend Or
- Stockwell (horse)
- The Baron (horse)
