= Thrush (racehorse) =

Thoroughbred racehorse

- Sire: Missel Thrush
- Grandsire: Orme
- Dam: Chemistry
- Damsire: Charibert
- Sex: Stallion
- Foaled: 1902
- Country: Great Britain
- Colour: Bay
- Breeder: Captain J. Orr-Ewing
- Owner: Captain J. Orr-Ewing
- Trainer: E. Robson
- Record: 22: 15-2-3

Major wins
- Great Foal Plate (1904); Hurst Park Foal Plate (1904); Challenge Stakes (1905); Sussex Stakes (1905); King's Stand Stakes (1906); July Cup (1906)

Thrush (1902–13 December 1925) was a British Thoroughbred racehorse. He was trained by E. Robson and won fifteen of his twenty-two starts. His wins included the Great Foal Plate, Sussex Stakes, King's Stand Stakes and July Cup. Thrush was owned by Captain J. Orr-Ewing.

== Background ==
Thrush was a bay colt bred by Captain J. Orr-Ewing and foaled in 1902. His sire Missel Thrush was a son of dual Eclipse Stakes winner Orme, but was not a top class racehorse himself. Thrush's dam Chemistry was a daughter of Charibert.

== Racing career ==
=== 1904: Two-year-old season ===
Thrust made his racecourse debut on 4 April 1904 in the five-furlong Gosforth Park Juvenile Stakes at Newcastle. He started as the 4/7 favourite and won easily by four lengths from Choirmaster. At the end of the month he started as the favourite for the May Plate at Newmarket. He faced twelve opponents and finished in third place, three and a half lengths behind winner Grandiflora. He then won the five-furlong Salisbury Foal Stakes by a length and a half from Eugenia Colt, followed by the Hurst Park Foal Plate, beating twelve rivals over the same distance at Hurst Park.

On 5 July he easily won the five-furlong Bibury Club Junior Home-bred Stakes at Salisbury, starting as the 12/100 favourite and beating his only rival Amphinome by two lengths. Four days later he ran in the valuable five-furlong Great Foal Stakes at Lingfield Park. Starting as the 4/9 favourite, he took the lead after the field had run one furlong and ran on to win easily by three lengths from Padrone.

=== 1905: Three-year-old season ===
In his first race of the season he finished fourth in the Bickerstaffe Stakes. The race was won by Vedas. On 12 May he finished second of seventeen in the six-furlong Stewards' Handicap at Kempton Park. In the final furlong he challenged winner St. Brendan, but could hot quite catch him and lost by a head, with only a short head dividing Thrush in second from Brother Bill in third. At Epsom Downs on 1 June Thrush finished third in the Royal Stakes over six furlongs. He was less than half a length behind winner Golden Gleam and was carrying 22 lbs more weight than him. The favourite Delauney finished in second place and was carrying significantly more weight than both Golden Gleam and Thrush. On 13 June he easily won the Hurst Park Yearling Plate by two lengths from Lord Hastings, after starting the 1/5 favourite. At Royal Ascot he won the five-furlong Fern Hill Stakes by a neck from Sweet Mary, followed by the Wilton Handicap, which he won by three lengths from Out O' Sight.

At Goodwood he started the 7/1 second favourite for the Stewards' Cup. Polymelus started as the 9/2 favourite. The race was won by 25/1 outsider Xeny, who beat Thrust by a length and a half, with Polymelus just behind Thrush in third place. At the same meeting he started as the 1/2 favourite for the Sussex Stakes and the only opposition he faced was from Commune. Commune led Thrush by about two lengths until they had a quarter of a mile left to run, when Trush challenged for the lead. Thrush went on to win by half a length in what was his first race over the distance of a mile.

In September he finished fourth in the Portland Plate, with the race behind won by Xeny, and at the end of the month he carried top weight to win the Newbury Autumn Three Year Old Handicap by one and a half lengths from Borghese. In October he won the Challenge Stakes by a head from Queens Holiday. Thrush's Goodwood conqueror Xeny was a further length back as the last of the three runners.

=== 1906: Four-year-old season ===
Trush's first race as a four-year-old came in the one-mile Spring Handicap at Newbury. Despite carrying top-weight he started as the 9/4 favourite. He finished the race in third of the twelve runners, five lengths behind winner Succory. At Royal Ascot he faced only two rivals for the King's Stand Stakes. Thrush, Queen's Holiday and Imperial II all started as 2/1 co-favourites. Thrush's two opponents held a clear lead from him until two furlongs from the finish, when he joined them to challenge for the lead. As they neared the finish Thrush ran away from the pair to win easily by four lengths from Queen's Holiday, with Imperial II a further length and a half back. On 27 June he won the one-mile Perkins Memorial Plate at Newcastle, beating Athi by four lengths and a few days later at Newmarket he won the six-furlong July Cup, beating his only rival Melayr by four lengths. Thrush's final race was in October, when he beat Velocity by a head to win the one-mile Select Stakes at Newmarket.

== Stud career ==
Thrush's son Jackdaw sired Doncaster Cup and six-time Queen Alexandra Stakes winner Brown Jack and Grand National winners Grakle and Kellsboro Jack. He died on 13 December 1925 at the age of 23 years.

== Pedigree ==
Pedigree of Thrush, bay stallion, 1902
Sire Missel Thrush (GB) br. 1897	Orme b. 1889	Ormonde b. 1883	Bend Or
Sire Missel Thrush (GB) br. 1897	Orme b. 1889	Ormonde b. 1883	Lily Agnes
Sire Missel Thrush (GB) br. 1897	Orme b. 1889	Angelica b. 1873	Galopin
Sire Missel Thrush (GB) br. 1897	Orme b. 1889	Angelica b. 1873	St. Angela
Sire Missel Thrush (GB) br. 1897	Throstle b. 1891	Petrarch b. 1873	Lord Clifden
Sire Missel Thrush (GB) br. 1897	Throstle b. 1891	Petrarch b. 1873	Laura
Sire Missel Thrush (GB) br. 1897	Throstle b. 1891	Thistle b. 1875	The Scottish Chief
Sire Missel Thrush (GB) br. 1897	Throstle b. 1891	Thistle b. 1875	The Flower Safety
Dam Chemistry (GB) ch. 1888	Charibert ch. 1876	Thormanby ch. 1857	Windhound
Dam Chemistry (GB) ch. 1888	Charibert ch. 1876	Thormanby ch. 1857	Alice Hawthorn
Dam Chemistry (GB) ch. 1888	Charibert ch. 1876	Gertrude b. 1867	Saunterer
Dam Chemistry (GB) ch. 1888	Charibert ch. 1876	Gertrude b. 1867	Queen Bertha
Dam Chemistry (GB) ch. 1888	Retort ch. 1883	Rosebery b. 1872	Speculum
Dam Chemistry (GB) ch. 1888	Retort ch. 1883	Rosebery b. 1872	Ladylike
Dam Chemistry (GB) ch. 1888	Retort ch. 1883	Re-echo ch. 1879	Reverberation
Dam Chemistry (GB) ch. 1888	Retort ch. 1883	Re-echo ch. 1879	Mabille

Note: b. = Bay, br. = Brown, ch. = Chestnut
