= Brulette =

French-bred Thoroughbred racehorse

- Sire: Bruleur
- Grandsire: Chouberski
- Dam: Seaweed
- Damsire: Spearmint
- Sex: Mare
- Foaled: 1928
- Country: France
- Colour: Bay
- Breeder: Charles Wilfred Birkin
- Owner: Charles Wilfred Birkin; Lord Woolavington
- Trainer: Frank Carter; Fred Darling
- Record: 14: 7-2-0

Major wins
- Prix Penelope (1931); Epsom Oaks (1931); Prix du Cadran (1932); Goodwood Cup (1932); Jockey Club Cup (1932)

Brulette (1928 – December 1950) was a French-bred Thoroughbred racehorse and broodmare. After winning one minor race as a juvenile she emerged as a top-class middle-distance horse in the following year, winning the Prix Penelope and the Epsom Oaks as well as finishing second in the Prix Vermeille and fourth in the Prix de l'Arc de Triomphe. When campaigned over longer distances in 1932 she won the Prix du Cadran in France before being transferred to England where she won the Goodwood Cup and Jockey Club Cup. After failing to reproduce her best form in 1933 she was retired from racing.

Although she had little immediate success as a dam of winners she had a long-term impact through her daughters and was the female-line ancestor of All Along, Vaguely Noble, Diminuendo, Enstone Spark and Casamento.

== Background ==
Brulette was a bay mare bred in France by the Englishman Charles Wilfred Birkin. Birkin sent his filly into training with Frank Carter at Chantilly.

She was sired by Bruleur, an outstanding racehorse who won the Grand Prix de Paris and Prix Royal-Oak in 1913 before becoming a successful breeding stallion. He was the Leading sire in France in 1921, 1924 and 1929. Bruleur was a representative of the Byerley Turk sire line, unlike more than 95% of modern thoroughbreds, who descend directly from the Darley Arabian. Her dam, the British-bred mare Seaweed had previously produced Hotweed (a full-brother to Brulette) who won the Prix du Jockey Club and the Grand Prix de Paris in 1929.

== Racing career ==
=== 1930: two-year-old season ===
Brulette ran twice as a juvenile in France in 1930, winning on her second start.

=== 1931: three-year-old season ===
In the spring of 1931 Brulette won her first two races in France including a five length victory in the Prix Penelope over 2100 metres at Saint-Cloud Racecourse. Charles Birkin then received an offer of £10,000 for the filly but refused to sell.

Brulette was then sent to England for the 153rd running of the Oaks Stakes over one and a half miles at Epsom Racecourse on 5 June and started the 7/2 joint-favourite alongside the 1000 Guineas runner-up Lady Marjorie while the best-fancied of the other thirteen runners included Four Course, Lindos Ojos (third in the Guineas) and Links Tor. The race took place on a wet and miserable day but attracted a large crowd which included the King and Queen. Ridden by Charlie Elliott, Brulette tracked the leaders but approaching the final furlong she was boxed in on the rails in third place behind Links Tor and Four Course. Fortunately for the French filly's supporters, Links Tor edged away from the rail, enabling Elliott to squeeze Brulette through the resulting gap and produce a strong late run. She won by a length from Four Course with Links Tor three-quarters of a length away in third. Her owner commented "I think she is something out of the common... She is a lazy sort, and it was a long time in the race before she got properly going".

Brulette was campaigned in France for the remainder of the season. On 27 June was matched against male opposition in the Grand Prix de Paris at Longchamp Racecourse but finished unplaced behind the colt Barneveldt. She ran very well in defeat in two subsequent races, finishing second to Pearl Cap in the Prix Vermeille and fourth behind the same horse in the Prix de l'Arc de Triomphe.

=== 1932: four-year-old season ===
Charles Birkin, had bred Brulette and owned her throughout her racing career, died in England in April 1932. In May Brulette began her third season in the Prix du Cadran over 4000 metres at Longchamp in May and won from Bruledur (runner-up in the Prix du Jockey-Club) and Barneveldt.

She was then bought by Lord Woolavington for a sum reported to be in excess of £5,000 and relocated to England where she entered the Beckhampton stable of Fred Darling. On her first appearance for her new connections Brulette contested the Queen Alexandra Stakes over two and three quarter miles at Royal Ascot, but was beaten by Brown Jack who was winning the race for the fourth time. In the Goodwood Cup on 28 July Brown Jack and Ut Majeur (Cesarewitch) started 9/4 joint-favourites with Brulette, ridden by Gordon Richards, the 5/2 third choice in a five-runner field. Racing on very heavy ground Brulette won by four lengths from Brown Jack, with ten lengths back to Ut Majeur in third place. On 27 October at Newmarket Racecourse Brulette was allowed a walkover in the Jockey Club Cup when no horses appeared to oppose her.

=== 1933: five-year-old season ===
Brulette remained in training as a five-year-old in 1933 but failed to recover her best form. She finished unplaced in both the Ascot Gold Cup and the Goodwood Cup.

== Assessment and honours ==
In their book, A Century of Champions, based on the Timeform rating system, John Randall and Tony Morris rated Brulette an "average" winner of the Oaks.

== Breeding record ==
At the end of her racing career, Brulette was retired to become a broodmare in England. She produced at least twelve foals between 1935 and 1950:

- Croix de Feu, a bay filly, foaled in 1935, sired by Press Gang
- Protein, brown filly, 1936, by Manna. Female-line ancestor of All Along.
- Thoroughfare, chestnut colt, 1938, by Fairway. Winner.
- Brulee, bay filly, 1939, by Fairway
- Tropical Sun, chestnut filly, 1940, Hyperion. Winner, third in Epsom Oak. Female-line ancestor of Vaguely Noble, Enstone Spark and Casamento.
- Muirburn, bay filly, 1941, by Easton
- Desert Sun, bay filly, 1942, Hyperion. Winner. Female-line ancestor of Diminuendo.
- Brusque, filly, 1943, by Casanova. Winner.
- Stockade, bay colt, 1944, by Big Game
- Tudor Rose, bay filly, 1945, by Owen Tudor
- Gotte d'Azur, filly, 1947, by Montrose
- Spun Sugar, bay filly, 1950, by Honeyway

Brulette died in December 1950 from colic.

== Pedigree ==
Pedigree of Brulette (FR), bay mare, 1928
Sire Bruleur (FR) 1910	Chouberski; 1902	Gardefeu	Cambyse
Sire Bruleur (FR) 1910	Chouberski; 1902	Gardefeu	Bougie
Sire Bruleur (FR) 1910	Chouberski; 1902	Campanule	The Bard (GB)
Sire Bruleur (FR) 1910	Chouberski; 1902	Campanule	Santa Lucia (GB)
Sire Bruleur (FR) 1910	Basse Terre; 1899	Omnium II	Upas
Sire Bruleur (FR) 1910	Basse Terre; 1899	Omnium II	Bluette
Sire Bruleur (FR) 1910	Basse Terre; 1899	Bijou (GB)	St. Gatien
Sire Bruleur (FR) 1910	Basse Terre; 1899	Bijou (GB)	Thora
Dam Seaweed (GB) 1916	Spearmint; 1903	Carbine (NZ)	Musket (GB)
Dam Seaweed (GB) 1916	Spearmint; 1903	Carbine (NZ)	Mersey (GB)
Dam Seaweed (GB) 1916	Spearmint; 1903	Maid of the Mint	Minting
Dam Seaweed (GB) 1916	Spearmint; 1903	Maid of the Mint	Warble
Dam Seaweed (GB) 1916	Seadune; 1908	Ayrshire	Hampton
Dam Seaweed (GB) 1916	Seadune; 1908	Ayrshire	Atalanta
Dam Seaweed (GB) 1916	Seadune; 1908	Seadown	Orvieto
Dam Seaweed (GB) 1916	Seadune; 1908	Seadown	New Zealand (Family: 1-d)
