= 1886 Epsom Derby =

106th annual running of the Derby horse race

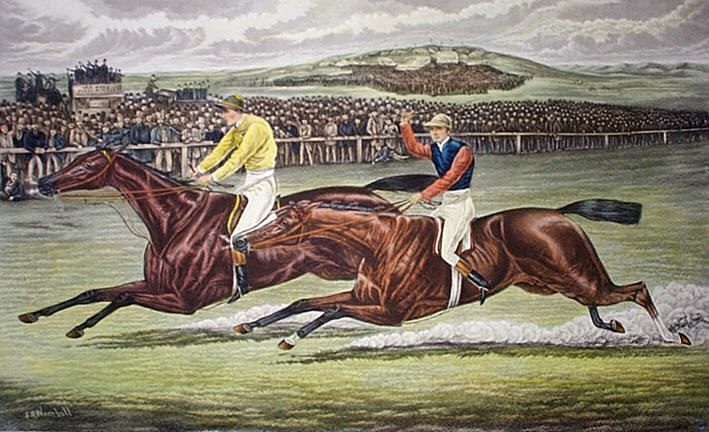
Engraving of the closing stages of the 1886 Derby, with Ormonde leading The Bard

The 1886 Epsom Derby was a horse race which took place at Epsom Downs on 26 May 1886. It was the 106th running of the Derby, and it was won by Ormonde. The winner was ridden by Fred Archer and trained by John Porter. At the initial nomination stage 205 entries were received. At the beginning of 1886 Ormonde, Minting and Saraband were all a similar price for the Derby, around 11/2, with The Bard at 6/1. Neither Minting or Saraband lined up at Epsom though, both having been easily beaten by Ormonde in the 2000 Guineas.

== Race details ==
- Prize money: £4,700
- Number of runners: 9
- Winner's time: 2m 45.6s

== Full result ==
	*	Horse	Jockey	Trainer	SP
1		Ormonde	Fred Archer	John Porter	40/85 fav
2	1½	The Bard	Charles Wood	Robert Peck	7/2
3	10	St. Mirin	Tom Cannon Sr.		40/1
4	hd	Button Park	George Barrett		1000/15
5	hd	Chelsea	Goater		50/1
6		Ariel	Wilton		200/1 ^{‡}
7		Scherso	J Osborne		1000/15
8		Greyfriars	John Watts		25/1
9		Coracle	F Webb		200/1 ^{‡}

^{‡}Odds of 1000/5 are for Coracle and Ariel coupled

* The distances between the horses are shown in lengths or shorter. shd = short-head; hd = head; PU = pulled up.

== Winner's details ==
Further details of the winner, Ormonde:

- Foaled: 1883
- Sire: Bend Or; Dam: Lily Agnes (Macaroni)
- Owner: Duke of Westminster
- Breeder: Duke of Westminster

== Form analysis ==
=== Two-year-old races ===
Notable runs by the future Derby participants as two-year-olds in 1885:

- Ormonde – 1st in Dewhurst Plate
- The Bard – 1st in Brocklesby Stakes, 1st in Westminster Stakes, 1st in Hyde Park Plate, 1st in New Biennial Stakes, 1st in July Plate
- St. Mirin – unplaced in July Stakes, unplaced in Middle Park Plate
- Button Park - unplaced in Middle Park Plate

=== Road to Epsom ===
Notable runs by the future Derby participants as three-year-olds:

- Ormonde – 1st in 2000 Guineas
- St. Mirin – unplaced in 2000 Guineas
- Button Park - unplaced in Payne Stakes
- Coracle – unplaced in 2000 Guineas

=== Subsequent wins ===
Notable wins by the Derby participants:

- Ormonde – St. James's Palace Stakes (1886), Hardwicke Stakes (1886), Champion Stakes (1886 & 1887), St Leger (1886), Imperial Gold Cup (1887)
- The Bard – Goodwood Cup (1886)
- St. Mirin – Liverpool Cup (1887)
