= Robert the Devil (disambiguation) =

Robert the Devil is a figure of medieval European legend.

Robert the Devil may also refer to:

- Robert the Devil, or Robert le diable, an 1831 opera by Giacomo Meyerbeer
- Robert the Devil (Gilbert), an 1868 operatic parody of Meyerbeer's opera by W. S. Gilbert
- Robert the Devil (horse) (1877–1889), British thoroughbred racehorse
- Robert the Devil, an LNER Gresley pacific locomotive, named after the racehorse
- Robert I, Duke of Normandy (1000–1035), sometimes identified with the character of legend
