= Exhibitionnist =

French-bred Thoroughbred racehorse

- Sire: Solario
- Grandsire: Gainsborough
- Dam: Lady Wembley
- Damsire: Tredennis
- Sex: Mare
- Foaled: 1934
- Country: France
- Colour: Bay
- Breeder: Victor Sassoon
- Owner: Victor Sassoon
- Trainer: Joseph Lawson
- Record: 6: 3–1–0 (incomplete)

Major wins
- 1000 Guineas (1937); Epsom Oaks (1937)

Exhibitionnist (foaled 1934) was a French-bred, British-trained Thoroughbred racehorse and broodmare, best known for winning two Classics in 1937. The filly won three times from six races in a racing career which lasted from 1936 until July 1937. After winning as a two-year-old she finished second on her three-year-old debut to Mid-day Sun, a colt who went on to win The Derby. Exhibitionnist then won the 1000 Guineas over one mile at Newmarket and at Epsom Oaks over one and a half miles at Epsom Downs Racecourse a month later. She finished fourth in her only subsequent race and was retired to stud, where she had some success as a broodmare.

== Background ==
Exhibitionnist was a bay mare with a white blaze bred in France by her owner Sir Victor Sassoon, a British businessman and hotelier. The filly was sired by Solario, who won the St Leger Stakes in 1925 before becoming a highly successful sire. The successes of Exhibitionnist contributed significantly towards Solario winning the British sires' championship in 1937. Exhibitionnist's dam, Lady Wembley won three races before being bought by Sassoon for 750 Guineas as a prospective broodmare. Lady Wembley was a daughter of Captive Princess, a mare who won the Irish Oaks and Irish St Leger in 1916.

Sassoon sent the filly to be trained by Joseph Lawson at his stables at Manton in Wiltshire. Although her name was sometimes "corrected" in the press, it was officially spelled with a double n, because of a mistake by a French clerk when her name was being registered.

== Racing career ==
Racing as a two-year-old in 1936, Exhibitionnist won one race.

On her first appearance of 1937, Exhibitionnist ran against colts in the Free Handicap over seven furlongs at Newmarket on 15 April. Carrying a weight of 105 pounds, she finished second, beaten three quarters of a length by Mid-day Sun, a colt who was carrying six pounds less. As both horses were lightly weighted, it seemed unlikely that the race would prove a significant classic trial, but the value of the form was boosted when Mid-day Sun finished third in the 2000 Guineas.

Two days after the 2000 Guineas, Exhibitionnist started 10/1 second favourite for the fillies' equivalent, the 1000 Guineas over Newmarket's Rowley Mile. Gainsborough Lass, a sister of Orwell, started favourite at 10/11 in a field of twenty fillies, and was confidently expected to win after an impressive win in the Column Stakes. Ridden by the fifty-two-year-old Steve Donoghue, Exhibitionnist led almost throughout the race and won by half a length from Spray, with Gainsborough Lass a head away in third. Her performance was described as "delightfully smooth" and gave Donoghue his first winner in the race. The winning time of 1:43.8 was 0.8 seconds faster than Le Ksar's winning time in the 2000 Guineas over the same course and distance.

Mid-day Sun won the Derby at Epsom on 2 June, and Exhibitionnist started 3/1 favourite in a field of thirteen for the Oaks two days later. Partnered again by Donoghue, she was among the leaders from the start and turned into the straight with a slight lead and position on the inside rail. In the straight she went clear of the field and won easily by three lengths and a head from Sweet Content and Sculpture. As at Newmarket, Exhibitionnist beat the colts on the clock: her winning time of 2:36.8 bettered the 2:37.2 set by Mid-day Sun. After the race Donoghue, who was riding his fourteenth and final British classic winner, said that he "never had an easier ride in my life".

In July, Exhibitionnist was sent to Goodwood to contest the ten furlong Nassau Stakes. She started odds on favourite but finished fourth behind First Flight. Exhibitionnist never raced again and was retired from racing.

== Assessment and honours ==
In their book, A Century of Champions, based on the Timeform rating system, John Randall and Tony Morris rated Exhibitionnist an "inferior" winner of the 1000 Guineas and Oaks.

== Stud record ==
In 1944, the ten-year-old Exhibitionnist was sent to the Newmarket December sales and was sold for 10,500 guineas. At stud, Exhibitionnist produced several winners. Her best foal was Sweet One, sired by Honeyway, who won the Ribblesdale Stakes and finished second in the Yorkshire Oaks in 1954.

== Pedigree ==
Pedigree of Exhibitionnist (FR), bay mare, 1934
Sire Solario (IRE) 1922	Gainsborough; 1915	Bayardo	Bay Ronald
Sire Solario (IRE) 1922	Gainsborough; 1915	Bayardo	Galicia
Sire Solario (IRE) 1922	Gainsborough; 1915	Rosedrop	St. Frusquin
Sire Solario (IRE) 1922	Gainsborough; 1915	Rosedrop	Rosaline
Sire Solario (IRE) 1922	Sun Worship; 1912	Sundridge	Amphion
Sire Solario (IRE) 1922	Sun Worship; 1912	Sundridge	Sierra
Sire Solario (IRE) 1922	Sun Worship; 1912	Doctrine	Ayrshire
Sire Solario (IRE) 1922	Sun Worship; 1912	Doctrine	Axiom
Dam Lady Wembley (GB) 1924	Tredennis; 1898	Kendal	Bend Or
Dam Lady Wembley (GB) 1924	Tredennis; 1898	Kendal	Windermere
Dam Lady Wembley (GB) 1924	Tredennis; 1898	St. Marguerite	Hermit
Dam Lady Wembley (GB) 1924	Tredennis; 1898	St. Marguerite	Devotion
Dam Lady Wembley (GB) 1924	Captive Princess; 1913	Captivation	Cyllene
Dam Lady Wembley (GB) 1924	Captive Princess; 1913	Captivation	Charm
Dam Lady Wembley (GB) 1924	Captive Princess; 1913	Princess Eager	Eager
Dam Lady Wembley (GB) 1924	Captive Princess; 1913	Princess Eager	Holmhurst (Family: 8-a)
