= Orwell (horse) =

British-bred Thoroughbred racehorse

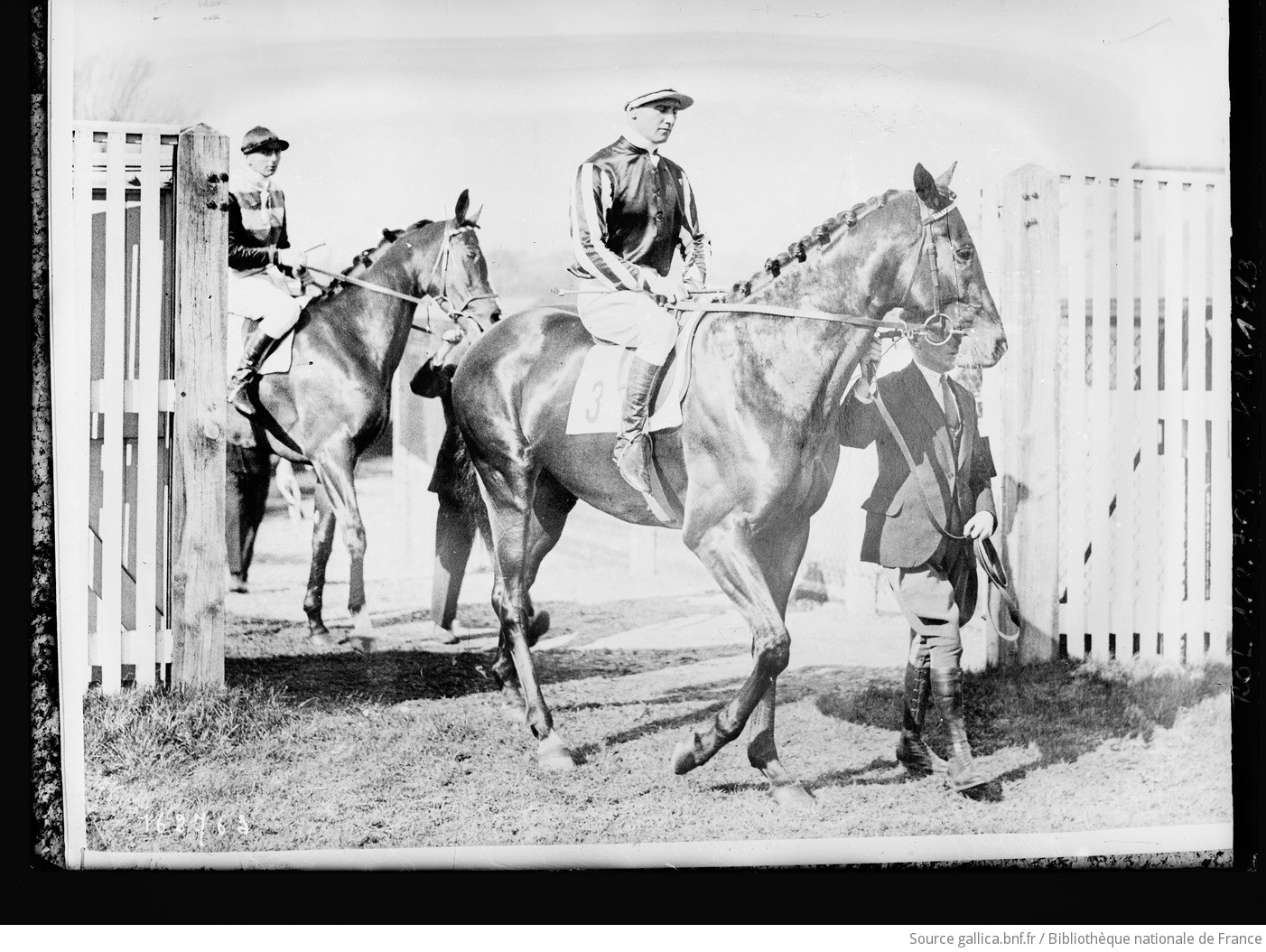
- 2000 Guineas (1932, Newmarket)
- Sire: Gainsborough
- Grandsire: Bayardo
- Dam: Golden Hair
- Damsire: Golden Sun
- Sex: Stallion
- Foaled: 1929
- Country: United Kingdom
- Colour: Brown
- Owner: Washington Singer
- Trainer: Joseph Lawson
- Record: 11:8-0-1
- Earnings: £30,106

Major wins
- Chesham Stakes (1931); National Breeders' Produce Stakes (1931); Champagne Stakes (1931); Imperial Produce Stakes (1931); Middle Park Stakes (1931); Greenham Stakes (1932); 2000 Guineas (1932)

Awards
- Top-rated British Two-year-old (1931)

Orwell (1929–1948), also known as the Golden Hair Colt, was a British Thoroughbred racehorse and sire. In a career that lasted from June 1931 to September 1932 he ran eleven times and won eight races. He was the leading British two-year-old of his generation, winning five successive races in 1931 including the Champagne Stakes and the Middle Park Stakes. During this season he was one of the last notable racehorses to race without being officially named. The following year he won the 2000 Guineas at Newmarket but was beaten when starting favourite for both The Derby and the St. Leger Stakes. At the end of 1932 he was retired to stud, where his record was disappointing.

== Background ==
Orwell was a good-looking, medium-sized bay horse with a "docile and sensible" temperament bred by the shipping magnate Marmaduke Furness, 1st Viscount Furness. As a yearling he was sent to the sales at Doncaster where he was bought for 3,000 guineas by Washington Singer. Singer sent the colt to be trained at Manton in Wiltshire by Joseph Lawson. Orwell was sired by the wartime Triple Crown winner Gainsborough out of the mare Golden Hair, a daughter of the sprinter Golden Sun.

Until 1913, there was no requirement for British racehorses to have official names and two-year-olds were allowed to run without names until 1946. The practice of running horses unnamed had once been common, but had largely fallen out of use by the early 20th Century. Singer however, delayed naming his horse, and the colt who would become Orwell raced throughout his first season under the descriptive name of "The Golden Hair Colt".

== Racing career ==
=== 1931: two-year-old season ===
The Golden Hair Colt made his racecourse debut at the Derby meeting at Epsom in the early summer of 1931. He had already acquired a reputation on the basis of his performances on the training gallops and started favourite, but finished third, a failure ascribed to his lack of experience and dislike of the firm ground. It proved to be his only defeat of the year. In June he was sent to Royal Ascot where he won the Chesham Stakes and then travelled to Sandown where he won the valuable National Breeders' Produce Stakes. By the end of July he was already regarded as one of the best of an unusually strong crop of British juveniles.

The Golden Hair Colt returned after a break to contest the prestigious Champagne Stakes at Doncaster's St Leger meeting in September. He won emphatically by four lengths from Mowgli, creating such a favourable impression that he was described as the best two-year-old seen in Britain since The Tetrarch twenty years earlier. Speculation at the time was that he would probably be named Triton. He then took the Imperial Produce Stakes on 10 October at Kempton Park, a win which allowed Joe Lawson to break the earnings record for a trainer in a British season. On his final start of the year he ran at Newmarket in the Middle Park Stakes, one of the season's most important races for two-year-olds. He won the race, taking his earnings to £19,468, breaking the record for a two-year-old trained in Britain which had stood since Donovan earned £16,487 in 1888. By this time he was being described as "the greatest two-year-old since Ormonde". In the Free Handicap, a ranking of the season's best juveniles, he was given the top rating of 133 pounds, although he surprisingly had to share first place with his unbeaten stable companion Mannamead. At the conclusion of the 1931 season, the Golden Hair Colt was officially registered under the name of Orwell.

=== 1932: three-year-old season ===
Before Orwell raced in 1932, his prospects of Classic success were improved when Mannamead broke down in training. On 8 April Orwell returned after the winter break to win the Greenham Stakes at Newbury Racecourse in which he raced over seven furlongs for the first time. Three weeks later he was stepped up to a mile for the first Classic of the season, the 2000 Guineas at Newmarket. Ridden by Robert "Bobby" Jones, he started evens (1/1) favourite in a field of eleven runners for a race run on soft ground in cool and windy conditions. Orwell looked impressive before the race and was tightly restrained by Jones in the early stages. Three furlongs from the finish he was switched left to obtain a clear run and made rapid progress to move up alongside the leader Dastur. In the closing stages he drew clear "in the smoothest possible style" and won by two lengths from Dastur with Hesperus in third.

Orwell's pedigree (on his dam's side) and his style of racing (he had "the action of a sprinter") led to doubts about his ability to stay one and a half miles in the Derby, but others argued that his sire was positive influence for stamina and his stable were reported to be confident following impressive performances in exercise. In the build-up to the Epsom Classic there were rumours of plans to prevent the horse from running and he was subject to strict security, appearing in the paddock before the race surrounded by guards and preceded by a mounted policeman. His owner was not among the huge crowd, having been forbidden from attending by his doctors who feared that the excitement of seeing his colt run could prove fatal. Orwell started the 5/4 favourite for the race in a field of twenty-one runners. Jones produced him with a run on the outside in the straight but he quickly came under pressure and weakened to finish ninth behind April the Fifth. Although his defeat was initially blamed on his failure to stay the distance and inability to handle the course he was subsequently found to be lame.

Orwell did not run again before the St Leger at Doncaster on 7 September. Despite a break of more than three months and the extended distance of one and three quarter miles he was again made favourite at odds of 4/1. He briefly looked to be a threat when moving into second place two furlongs from the finish but faded and finished unplaced behind the Aga Khan's colt Firdaussi. Three weeks after his defeat at Doncaster, Orwell was brought back in distance for the ten furlong Great Foal Stakes at Newmarket. He won the race but finished lame and was retired shortly afterwards.

== Stud career ==
Orwell was retired to stud at King Edward's Place, Wanborough, Wiltshire. His stud career was a disappointment, and he made very little impact before his death in 1948. His only major winner was Rosewell, who won the Irish Derby in 1938 and sired the Cheltenham Gold Cup winner Linwell and the Champion Hurdler Distel.

== Sire line tree ==
- Orwell
  - Rosewell
    - Distel
    - Linwell

== Pedigree ==
Pedigree of Orwell (GB), bay stallion, 1929
Sire Gainsborough (GB) 1915	Bayardo; 1906	Bay Ronald	Hampton*
Sire Gainsborough (GB) 1915	Bayardo; 1906	Bay Ronald	Black Duchess
Sire Gainsborough (GB) 1915	Bayardo; 1906	Galicia	Galopin*
Sire Gainsborough (GB) 1915	Bayardo; 1906	Galicia	Isoletta
Sire Gainsborough (GB) 1915	Rosedrop; 1907	St Frusquin	St Simon*
Sire Gainsborough (GB) 1915	Rosedrop; 1907	St Frusquin	Isabel
Sire Gainsborough (GB) 1915	Rosedrop; 1907	Rosaline	Trenton
Sire Gainsborough (GB) 1915	Rosedrop; 1907	Rosaline	Rosalys
Dam Golden Hair (GB) 1920	Golden Sun; 1910	Sundridge	Amphion
Dam Golden Hair (GB) 1920	Golden Sun; 1910	Sundridge	Sierra
Dam Golden Hair (GB) 1920	Golden Sun; 1910	Golden Lassie	Pioneer*
Dam Golden Hair (GB) 1920	Golden Sun; 1910	Golden Lassie	Nepenthe
Dam Golden Hair (GB) 1920	Tendril; 1902	St Simon*	Galopin*
Dam Golden Hair (GB) 1920	Tendril; 1902	St Simon*	St Angela*
Dam Golden Hair (GB) 1920	Tendril; 1902	Sweetwater	Hampton*
Dam Golden Hair (GB) 1920	Tendril; 1902	Sweetwater	Muscatel (Family:10-b)

* Orwell is inbred 4S x 3D to the stallion St Simon, meaning that he appears fourth generation on the sire side of his pedigree, and third generation on the dam side of his pedigree.

* Orwell is inbred 4S x 5S x 5D x 4D to the stallion Galopin, meaning that he appears fourth generation and fifth generation (via St Simon) on the sire side of his pedigree, and fifth generation (via Pioneer) and fourth generation on the dam side of his pedigree.

* Orwell is inbred 4S x 4D to the stallion Hampton, meaning that he appears fourth generation on the sire side of his pedigree, and fourth generation on the dam side of his pedigree.
