= Galatea (horse) =

French-bred Thoroughbred racehorse

- Sire: Dark Legend
- Grandsire: Dark Ronald
- Dam: Galaday
- Damsire: Sir Gallahad III
- Sex: Mare
- Foaled: 1936
- Country: France
- Colour: Brown
- Breeder: Robert Sterling Clark
- Owner: Robert Sterling Clark
- Trainer: Joseph Lawson
- Record: 6: 3–0–1

Major wins
- 1000 Guineas (1939); Epsom Oaks (1939)

Galatea (also known as Galatea II; 1936–1949) was a French-bred, British-trained Thoroughbred racehorse and broodmare, best known for winning two Classics in 1939. The filly won three times from six races in a racing career which lasted from 1938 until June 1939. After failing to win as a two-year-old she won her first three races of 1939 including the 1000 Guineas over one mile at Newmarket and The Oaks over one and a half miles at Epsom Downs Racecourse a month later. She was beaten in her only subsequent race and was retired to stud, where she had some success as a broodmare.

== Background ==
Galatea was a big, powerfully built brown mare bred in France by her owner Robert Sterling Clark, an American industrialist whose fortune derived from the Singer Sewing Machine company. Her sire Dark Legend, who was twenty-two when Galatea was foaled, finished third in the 1917 Epsom Derby and later became a champion racehorse in India. At stud he was a strong influence for stamina and his best runners included Easton (runner-up in the Derby), Duplex (Prix du Jockey Club) and Dark Japan (Goodwood Cup). He later became known as the damsire of Dante and Sayajirao. Galatea's dam Galaday won seven races in the United States before becoming Clark's first winner in England in 1931. At stud, she was a successful and influential broodmare, being the direct female ancestor of many winners including Never Say Die who won the Derby and St Leger for Clark in 1954.

Clark sent the filly to be trained in England by Joseph Lawson at his stables at Manton in Wiltshire. In England she was known as Galatea II to distinguish her from an English-bred racehorse with the same name.

== Racing career ==
=== 1938: two-year-old season ===
Galatea failed to win a race in two starts as a two-year-old in 1938. She showed promise however, by finishing third behind Seaway and Aurora in the Cheveley Park Stakes at Newmarket on 12 October.

=== 1939: three-year-old season ===
On her three-year-old debut, Galatea won the Lingfield Park Spring Stakes in which she defeated a colt named Casanova who had won the Dewhurst Stakes the previous autumn. Although she was carrying seventeen pounds less than the colt, the win was enough to establish her as a contender for the classics.

In the 1000 Guineas over Newmarket's Rowley Mile course on 28 April, Galatea started at odds of 6/1 in a field of eighteen fillies, with Lord Glanely's previously unraced filly Olein being made favourite. Ridden by Robert Anjail "Bobby" Jones, Galatea tracked the front-running Olein before taking the lead inside the final furlong and pulling clear to win easily by three lengths and half a length from Aurora and Olein. Her winning time of 1:38.6 was 0.8 seconds faster than the time recorded by Blue Peter in winning the 2000 Guineas over the same course two days earlier.

On 26 May, Galatea was moved up in distance for the one-and-a-half-mile Oaks at Epsom. She was made 10/11 favourite against twenty opponents. In a slowly run race, Jones positioned Galatea just behind the leaders and was in third place following Olein and Ella A. on the final turn. Early in the straight, Galatea took the lead and went clear of the field, but Jones appeared to ease the favourite down in the final furlong and was almost caught by the French-trained filly White Fox, who finished strongly on the inside. The winning margin was a head, with three lengths back to Superbe in third. Jones claimed after the race that he had the situation under control and could have won by much further had he so wished. Later in June, Galatea returned to one mile for the Coronation Stakes at Royal Ascot in which she carried 130 pounds and finished sixth behind Olein.

Galatea had been considered a contender for the St Leger Stakes in autumn, in which she would have been matched against The Derby winner Blue Peter. but racing was suspended following the outbreak of the War in September, preventing her from attempting the Fillies Triple Crown, and she never raced again.

== Assessment and honours ==
In their book, A Century of Champions, based on the Timeform rating system, John Randall and Tony Morris rated Galatea an "average" winner of the 1000 Guineas and Oaks.

== Breeding record ==
In 1940, Galatea and her dam Galaday were shipped to the United States, arriving at Boston on 13 July. At stud in America, Galatea produced three winners including Sugar Bun (by Mahmoud), who in turn produced the Jockey Club Stakes winner Darling Boy. Another daughter, Javotte, by Whirlaway failed to win herself, but bred five winners. Galatea died in 1949.

== Pedigree ==
Pedigree of Galatea (FR), brown mare, 1936
Sire Dark Legend (GB) 1914	Dark Ronald; 1905	Bay Ronald	Hampton
Sire Dark Legend (GB) 1914	Dark Ronald; 1905	Bay Ronald	Black Duchess
Sire Dark Legend (GB) 1914	Dark Ronald; 1905	Darkie	Thurio
Sire Dark Legend (GB) 1914	Dark Ronald; 1905	Darkie	Insignia
Sire Dark Legend (GB) 1914	Golden Legend bay 1907	Amphion	Rosebery
Sire Dark Legend (GB) 1914	Golden Legend bay 1907	Amphion	Suicide
Sire Dark Legend (GB) 1914	Golden Legend bay 1907	St Lucre	St Serf
Sire Dark Legend (GB) 1914	Golden Legend bay 1907	St Lucre	Fairy Gold
Dam Galaday (FR) 1927	Sir Gallahad III; 1920	Teddy	Ajax
Dam Galaday (FR) 1927	Sir Gallahad III; 1920	Teddy	Rondeau
Dam Galaday (FR) 1927	Sir Gallahad III; 1920	Plucky Liege	Spearmint
Dam Galaday (FR) 1927	Sir Gallahad III; 1920	Plucky Liege	Concertina
Dam Galaday (FR) 1927	Sunstep; 1916	Sunstar	Sundridge
Dam Galaday (FR) 1927	Sunstep; 1916	Sunstar	Doris
Dam Galaday (FR) 1927	Sunstep; 1916	Ascenseur	Eager
Dam Galaday (FR) 1927	Sunstep; 1916	Ascenseur	Skyscraper (Family No. 1-n)
