= Gay Kelleway =

British racehorse trainer (born 1963)

Personal information
- Born: 1963 (age 62–63) England
- Occupations: Jockey and trainer

Horse racing career
- Sport: Horse racing

Major racing wins
- Queen Alexandra Stakes

Significant horses
- Sprowston Boy

Gay Kelleway (born 1963) is a British racehorse trainer based in Exning, near Newmarket. She is a former jockey who competed in flat racing and was the first woman to ride a winner at Royal Ascot.

== Background ==
Kelleway comes from a racing background. Her father, Paul Kelleway, was a National Hunt jockey who became a trainer of horses on the flat. In 1976 the family moved from Sussex to Newmarket.

== Career as a jockey ==
Kelleway had her first ride as an amateur in 1980, when she was sixteen. The following year she rode her first winner and was second in the Ladies Amateur Championship. In 1982, aged eighteen, she became the youngest ever leading female amateur jockey and retained the title in 1983 before turning professional. In 1986 she was the first woman to ride in a British Classic race, coming last on Davemma in the Oaks. In 1987 she became the first woman to ride a winner at Royal Ascot when Sprowston Boy, trained by her father, won the Queen Alexandra Stakes by eight lengths. It would be thirty-two years before another woman rode a winner at the meeting. After eight years as a jockey, Kelleway switched to training as it became difficult to maintain a racing weight. Over her career as a jockey, Kelleway rode 86 winners in Britain and 16 abroad, including in New Zealand. Looking back in 2023, she said that attitudes towards her as a female jockey from the male-dominated racing community "were like the Dark Ages".

== Career as a trainer ==
Having worked as an assistant to her father, Kelleway took out a licence to train on her own account in 1992. In 1996, she saddled her first Group races Group winner, when Anzio won the Group 3 Ballyogan Stakes at The Curragh. Although training mostly on the flat, she saddled Absalom's Lady to win the Grade 2 Haldon Gold Cup over jumps at Exeter in November 1996. Her most successful year was 1997, when she sent out 53 winners.

Kelleway bought Queen Alexandra Stables in Exning in 2024 and remains there as of 2026, with plans to move her training operation to North Yorkshire in 2024 having fallen through.

== Awards ==
In 2023, Kelleway was a winner at the Thoroughbred Industry Employee Awards for her work in rescuing abandoned racehorses in Ukraine.

== Personal life ==
Kelleway featured in Horse Play, a play about Ascot winner Sprowston Boy, written in 2023 by Katie-anna Whiting, the granddaughter of one of the horse's owners.
