= Steve Donoghue =

British jockey

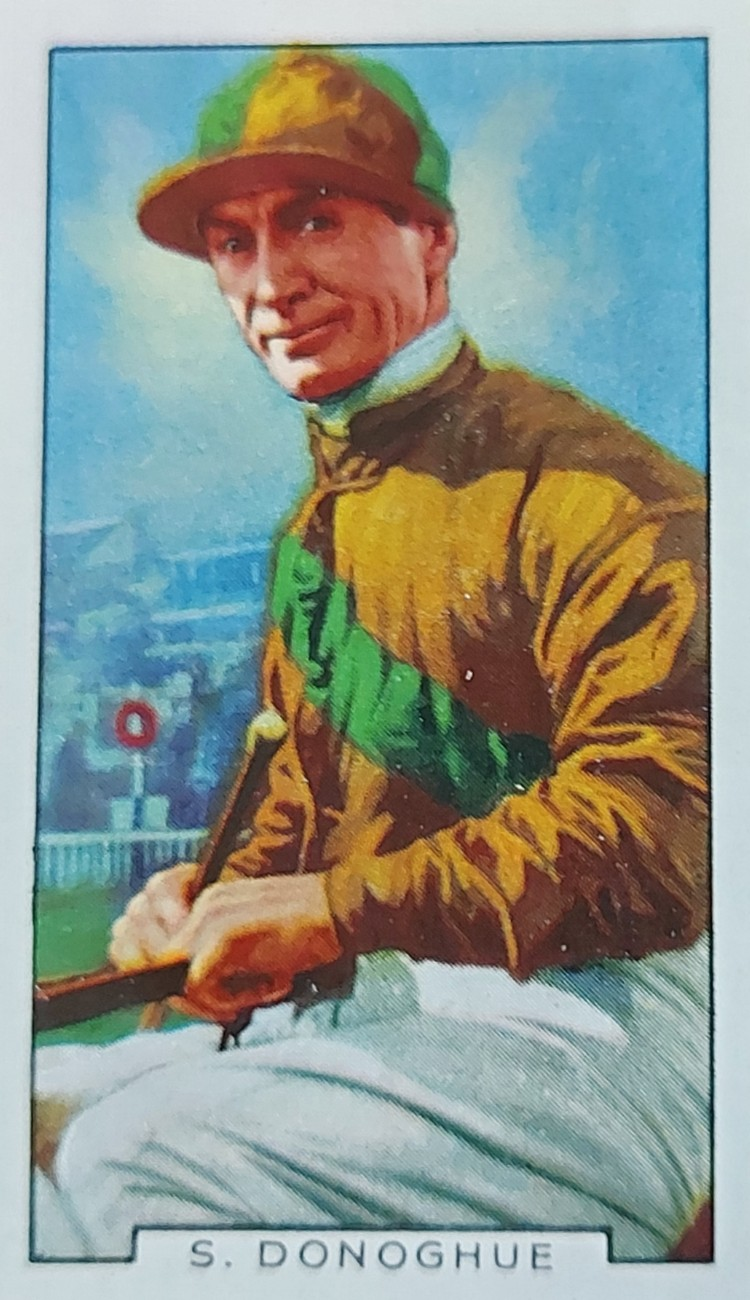
- Steve Donoghue, in the colours of Corlette Glorney (Gallaher's cigarette card, 1936)

Personal information
- Born: 8 November 1884 Warrington, England
- Died: 23 March 1945 (aged 60) London, England
- Occupation: Jockey

Horse racing career
- Sport: Horse racing

Major racing wins
- British Classic Race wins as jockey: 2000 Guineas (3); 1000 Guineas (1); Epsom Derby (6); Epsom Oaks (2); St Leger Stakes (2)

Racing awards
- British flat racing Champion Jockey 10 times (1914, 1915, 1916, 1917, 1918, 1919, 1920, 1921, 1922, 1923)

Significant horses
- The Tetrarch, Pommern, Gay Crusader, Humorist, Captain Cuttle, Papyrus, Manna, Brown Jack, Exhibitionnist

Steve Donoghue (8 November 1884 – 23 March 1945) was a leading English flat-race jockey in the 1910s and 1920s. He was Champion Jockey 10 times between 1914 and 1923 and was one of the most celebrated horse racing sportsmen after Fred Archer, with only Sir Gordon Richards and Sir Tony McCoy eclipsing him.

== Background ==
Stephen Donoghue was born in Warrington, Lancashire. His father was a steel-worker and the family had no racing connections. At the age of twelve he left home and decided to become a jockey after winning a prize for riding a donkey at a circus. Donoghue was apprenticed to John Porter when he was 14 years old, but ran away after being beaten for allowing a horse to get loose on the gallops. After working as an apprentice and work rider at two other British stables he accepted an offer to ride in France. In 1905 he rode his first winner at Hyères, before moving to Ireland in 1907 and returning to England in 1911.

== Career ==
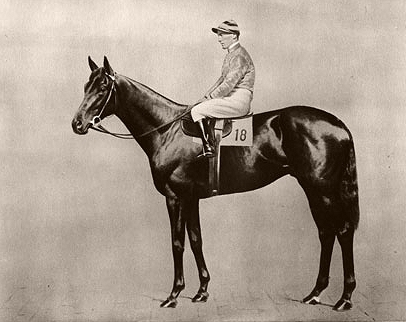
Steve Donoghue on The Derby winner, Manna

Donoghue accepted the post of stable jockey to Henry Seymour "Atty" Persse at Stockbridge, Hampshire and had his first major successes in 1913 on the outstanding two-year-old The Tetrarch. In the following year he rode 129 winners to claim the first of ten consecutive jockeys' championships.

His greatest triumphs came in The Derby which he won six times. The three consecutive wins in the early 1920s – on Humorist (1921), Captain Cuttle (1922) and Papyrus (1923) – were the high points. He was also associated with the horse Brown Jack – who he rode to six consecutive wins in the Queen Alexandra Stakes at Royal Ascot.

In 1915 and 1917, he rode the horses Pommern and Gay Crusader to the English Triple Crown. In its more than two-hundred-year history, of the jockeys aboard the fifteen winners, Steve Donoghue is the only one to have ever won the Triple Crown twice.

Always popular with the public and his fellow professionals, Donoghue was never called up by the stewards. He was less popular with owners and trainers because of his tendency to switch allegiance when he had the opportunity of a winning ride.

== Retirement ==
He retired from riding at the age of 53 at the end of the 1937 Flat season, a year in which he won two classics on the filly Exhibitionnist. Also in 1937, he appeared as himself in Wings of the Morning, Britain's first Technicolour film. Despite earning a great deal during his career his "impulsive generosity" and lack of business acumen led to financial difficulties. He took up training at Blewbury but had little success. Donoghue died in London on 23 March 1945 from a heart attack.

In 1999, the Racing Post ranked Donoghue as fourth in their list of the Top 50 jockeys of the 20th century.

== Classic Race Victories ==
- Epsom Derby winners – 1915: Pommern, 1917: Gay Crusader, 1921: Humorist, 1922: Captain Cuttle, 1923: Papyrus, 1925: Manna
- 1,000 Guineas winners – 1937: Exhibitionnist
- 2,000 Guineas winners – 1915: Pommern, 1917: Gay Crusader, 1925: Manna
- Epsom Oaks winners – 1918: My Dear, 1937: Exhibitionnist
- St. Leger Stakes winners – 1915: Pommern, 1917: Gay Crusader

== Interests ==
Away from his career he was an owner of greyhounds and was one of the first to enter them at the new Ensbury Park Racecourse.

== See also ==
- List of jockeys
