= Brown Jack =

Irish-bred Thoroughbred racehorse

- Sire: Jackdaw
- Grandsire: Thrush
- Dam: Querquidella
- Damsire: Kroonstad
- Sex: Gelding
- Foaled: 1924
- Country: Ireland
- Colour: Brown
- Breeder: G. S. Webb
- Owner: Sir Harold Wernher, Bt.
- Trainer: Aubrey Hastings; Ivor Anthony
- Record: 65: 25-?-?
- Earnings: £

Major wins
- Champion Hurdle (1928); Queen Alexandra Stakes (1929, 1930, 1931, 1932, 1933, 1934); Goodwood Cup (1930); Doncaster Cup (1930); Chester Cup (1931); Ebor Handicap (1931)

Brown Jack (1924–1948) was a Thoroughbred racehorse that raced over hurdles and then on the flat. He was a "stayer" – a horse specialising in longer races. He won the second Cheltenham Champion Hurdle in 1928, but his main claim to fame was winning the Queen Alexandra Stakes – the longest race in the flat racing calendar – for six years running, from 1929 to 1934. His repeated victories made him one of the most popular racehorses in the history of British racing. A bronze statue of Brown Jack, by the equestrian painter Sir Alfred Munnings, is to be seen at Ascot.

Brown Jack was a brown gelding, foaled in Ireland by Jackdaw out of Querquidella. He was bought as a 3 year old by Sir Harold Wernher, Bt. and trained by Aubrey Hastings to race over hurdles. After Hastings' death in 1929, he was trained by former jockey Ivor Anthony (brother of Jack Anthony and Owen Anthony). In 1928, as a 4-year-old in his first season, he won seven races from ten starts, including the Champion Hurdle at Cheltenham in 1928 ridden by Bilbie Rees, but then switched to the more lucrative racing on the flat.

He won the Ascot Stakes in 1928, and the 2.75-mile Queen Alexandra Stakes for six years running, from 1929 to 1934, each time ridden by veteran Champion Jockey Steve Donoghue. He won the Goodwood Cup and Doncaster Cup in 1930, and the Chester Cup in 1931, the Ebor Handicap in 1931 carrying 9 st 5 lb, and the Rosebery Memorial Plate.

After winning the Goodwood Cup and Doncaster Cup in 1930, he was second in both races in 1931, losing to Salmon Leap and Singapore respectively. He was also second in the Goodwood Cup in 1932, behind Brulette. He won 18 races from 55 starts on the flat. He retired with winnings of over £12,000.

Robert Charles Lyle published a biography of Brown Jack in 1934, detailing his races. London & North Eastern Railway A3 class locomotive 60043 was named after the horse. Built at Doncaster Works it entered service in December 1935. Philip Larkin's poem "At Grass" was inspired by a film of Brown Jack in retirement with another horse.

== See also ==
- Repeat winners of horse races
