= Four Course =

British-bred Thoroughbred racehorse

- Sire: Tetratema
- Grandsire: The Tetrarch
- Dam: Dinner
- Damsire: Dinneford
- Sex: Mare
- Foaled: 4 April 1928
- Country: United Kingdom
- Colour: Bay
- Breeder: J P Arkwright
- Owner: John Egerton, 4th Earl of Ellesmere
- Trainer: Fred Darling
- Record: 9: 4-3-0
- Earnings: £14,074

Major wins
- July Stakes (1930); Richmond Stakes (1930); Gimcrack Stakes (1930); 1000 Guineas (1931)

Four Course (1928 – 1932) was a British Thoroughbred racehorse. She was one of the best two-year-old fillies of her generation in England when she won three of her four races, namely the July Stakes, Richmond Stakes and Gimcrack Stakes. In the following spring she won the 1000 Guineas and finished second in both the Epsom Oaks and the Falmouth Stakes. She was retired at the end of the year but died before she could make and mark as a broodmare.

== Background ==
Four Course was a bay mare bred in England by J P Arkwright. As a foal the filly was put up for auction at Newmarket and was bought for 910 guineas by the trainer Fred Darling. A year later she returned to the sales ring and fetched 3,000 guineas with the winning bid coming from Lord Ellesmere. She was trained throughout her racing career by Darling at Beckhampton in Wiltshire.

Four Course's sire Tetratema, was the leading British two-year-old of 1919 and went on to win the 2000 Guineas and many important sprint races. As a breeding stallion, Tetratema sired many good sprinters and milers including Tiffin, Mr Jinks and Myrobella and was the British champion sire in 1929. Four Course's dam, Dinner became an influential broodmare whose descendants included Ridge Wood, Old Vic, High Top and Acatenango.

== Racing career ==
=== 1930: two-year-old season ===
As a two-year-old in 1930, Four Course was ridden in most of her races by Freddie Fox. In her first engagement at Royal Ascot in June she started favourite but finished second to the colt Goyescas in the Chesham Stakes. For the rest of the season the filly continued to be matched against male opposition, eschewing in the main fillies' races. At Newmarket Racecourse in the following month she won the July Stakes at odds of 15/8, from a field which included Portlaw (later to win the Middle Park Stakes). A month later at Goodwood Racecourse she started 8/13 favourite for the Richmond Stakes and won from the colt Disarmament. Another win followed at York Racecourse on 28 August when she prevailed by a short head and a neck from Lampeto and Pisa in the Gimcrack Stakes.

By the end of the season, Four Course had earned £5,220 in first-place prize money. In the Free Handicap, a ranking of the year's best juveniles, she was rated the second best filly of 1930 behind the Aga Khan's Turtle Soup.

=== 1931: three-year-old season ===
On 1 May 1931, Four Course started at odds of 11/1 in a twenty-runner field for the 118th running of the 1000 Guineas over the Rowley Mile at Newmarket. She was ridden by Charlie Elliott, who won a coin toss with Fox for the right to have first choice of mount. She won by a head from Lady Marjorie (who appeared to be a somewhat unlucky loser after swerving in the final furlong) with Lindos Ojos a length away in third. Her victory earned her owner £8,854.

Four Course was stepped up in distance for the Oaks Stakes over one and a half miles at Epsom Racecourse on 5 June and started at odds of 6/1. Ridden by Fox, she ran well and looked likely to win after taking the lead in the straight but was overtaken in the closing stages and beaten a length into second by the French-trained filly Brulette. The filly was dropped back in distance for the Falmouth Stakes at Newmarket in July and finished second to Pisa, to whom she was conceding fourteen pounds in weight. She was beaten in two subsequent races and retired from racing at the end of the year.

== Assessment and honours ==
In their book, A Century of Champions, based on the Timeform rating system, John Randall and Tony Morris rated Four Course a "poor" winner of the 1000 Guineas.

== Breeding record ==
Four Course was retired from racing to become a broodmare but died of tetanus at Cloghran Stud in Ireland before she produced any foals.

== Pedigree ==
Pedigree of Four Course (GB), bay mare, 1928
Sire Tetratema (GB) 1917	The Tetrarch (IRE); 1911	Roi Herode (FR)	Le Samaritain
Sire Tetratema (GB) 1917	The Tetrarch (IRE); 1911	Roi Herode (FR)	Roxelane
Sire Tetratema (GB) 1917	The Tetrarch (IRE); 1911	Vahren (GB)	Bona Vista
Sire Tetratema (GB) 1917	The Tetrarch (IRE); 1911	Vahren (GB)	Castania
Sire Tetratema (GB) 1917	Scotch Gift (GB); 1907	Symington	Ayrshire
Sire Tetratema (GB) 1917	Scotch Gift (GB); 1907	Symington	Tarporley
Sire Tetratema (GB) 1917	Scotch Gift (GB); 1907	Maund	Ianthe
Sire Tetratema (GB) 1917	Scotch Gift (GB); 1907	Maund	Sandal
Dam Dinner (IRE) 1913	Dinneford (GB); 1902	Dinna Forget	Loved One
Dam Dinner (IRE) 1913	Dinneford (GB); 1902	Dinna Forget	Barometer
Dam Dinner (IRE) 1913	Dinneford (GB); 1902	Gracie (IRE)	Arbitrator
Dam Dinner (IRE) 1913	Dinneford (GB); 1902	Gracie (IRE)	Sylva
Dam Dinner (IRE) 1913	Pernelle (IRE); 1907	Persimmon (GB)	St Simon
Dam Dinner (IRE) 1913	Pernelle (IRE); 1907	Persimmon (GB)	Perdita
Dam Dinner (IRE) 1913	Pernelle (IRE); 1907	Nuneaton (GB)	Bend Or
Dam Dinner (IRE) 1913	Pernelle (IRE); 1907	Nuneaton (GB)	Capucine (Family 11-a)
