= Ossory (horse) =

British-bred Thoroughbred racehorse

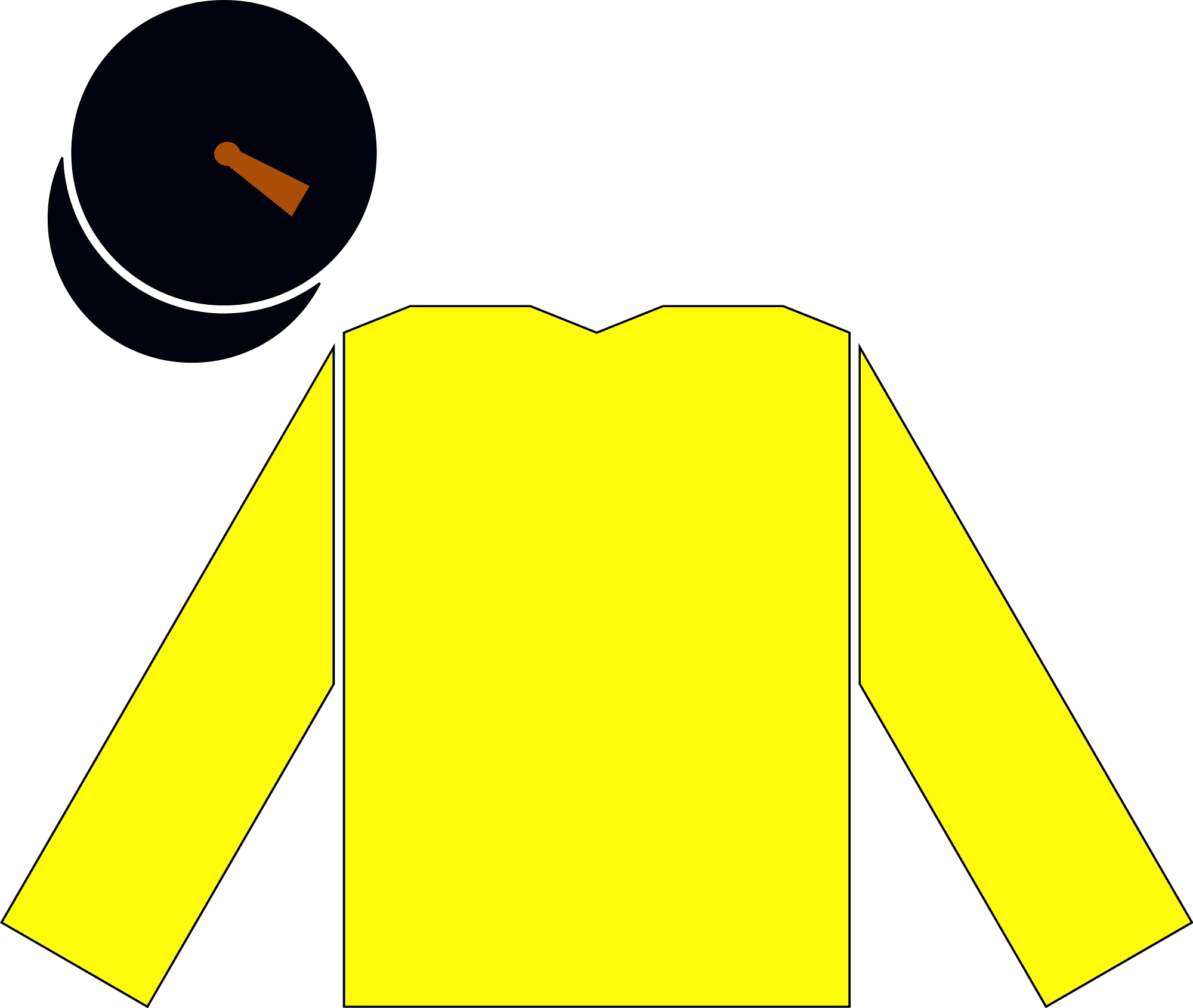
- Racing silks of the Duke of Westminster
- Sire: Bend Or
- Grandsire: Doncaster
- Dam: Lily Agnes
- Damsire: Macaroni
- Sex: Colt
- Foaled: 1885
- Colour: Chestnut
- Breeder: 1st Duke of Westminster
- Owner: 1st Duke of Westminster
- Trainer: John Porter
- Record: 5 wins
- Earnings: £5,358

Major wins
- Prince of Wales's Stakes (1888); St. James's Palace Stakes (1888); Great Yorkshire Stakes (1888)

Ossory (1885–1889) was a Thoroughbred racehorse. He was trained at Kingsclere by John Porter for the 1st Duke of Westminster. As a three-year-old he won the Prince of Wales's Stakes and St. James's Palace Stakes at Royal Ascot.

== Breeding ==
Ossory was a full-brother to the unbeaten Triple Crown winner Ormonde. Both being sons of Epsom Derby winner Bend Or and Doncaster Cup winner Lily Agnes. Like his brother Ormonde, Ossory was a roarer.

== Racing career ==
Ossory only raced once as a two-year-old, winning the Criterion Stakes at Newmarket. He started as a 50/1 outsider for the 2000 Guineas and finished last out of the six runners. He then went to Royal Ascot for the Prince of Wales's Stakes. Starting at odds of 10/1 Ossory pulled away in the last 100 yards to win by three lengths from Galore. Ossory and Galore met again at the Royal meeting, this time over a mile in the St. James's Palace Stakes where only the two lined up. With 300 yards to go the two horses were level and then Galore began to edge ahead, but in the closing strides Ossory came back at him and the race finished in a dead heat.

Ossory next started in the Eclipse Stakes. Starting at 100/6 and ridden by Tom Cannon junior he led the field of thirteen in the opening stages of the race. Three furlongs into the race he had a sizeable lead, but stablemate Orbit had closed the gap as they entered the finishing straight. By the time they entered the final 100 yards Orbit had taken the lead, which he gradually increased to win by a length from Ossory, with Martley a further length back in third place. Ossory then finished unplaced in the Sussex Stakes. His next race came in at York where he started as the 5/4 joint favourite for the Great Yorkshire Stakes. Ossory led his two rivals into the finishing straight and neither were able to catch him, leaving Ossory to win by a length from Arrandale. He made the running in the St Leger Stakes and finished unplaced.

== Death ==
After the 1888 season Ossory was sold for stud duties and exported to South America. He left in January 1889, but while on the journey they experienced severe weather conditions in the Atlantic Ocean. As a result of this Ossory died from exhaustion and was thrown overboard.

== Pedigree ==
Pedigree of Ossory, chestnut colt, 1885
Sire Bend Or ch. 1877	Doncaster ch. 1870	Stockwell ch. 1849	The Baron
Sire Bend Or ch. 1877	Doncaster ch. 1870	Stockwell ch. 1849	Pocahontas
Sire Bend Or ch. 1877	Doncaster ch. 1870	Marigold ch. 1860	Teddington
Sire Bend Or ch. 1877	Doncaster ch. 1870	Marigold ch. 1860	Ratan mare
Sire Bend Or ch. 1877	Rouge Rose ch. 1865	Thormanby ch. 1857	Windhound
Sire Bend Or ch. 1877	Rouge Rose ch. 1865	Thormanby ch. 1857	Alice Hawthorn
Sire Bend Or ch. 1877	Rouge Rose ch. 1865	Ellen Horne br. 1844	Redshank
Sire Bend Or ch. 1877	Rouge Rose ch. 1865	Ellen Horne br. 1844	Delhi
Dam Lily Agnes b. 1871	Macaroni b. 1860	Sweetmeat br. 1842	Gladiator
Dam Lily Agnes b. 1871	Macaroni b. 1860	Sweetmeat br. 1842	Lollypop
Dam Lily Agnes b. 1871	Macaroni b. 1860	Jocose b. 1843	Pantaloon
Dam Lily Agnes b. 1871	Macaroni b. 1860	Jocose b. 1843	Banter
Dam Lily Agnes b. 1871	Polly Agnes b./br. 1865	The Cure b. 1841	Physician
Dam Lily Agnes b. 1871	Polly Agnes b./br. 1865	The Cure b. 1841	Morsel
Dam Lily Agnes b. 1871	Polly Agnes b./br. 1865	Miss Agnes br. 1850	Birdcatcher
Dam Lily Agnes b. 1871	Polly Agnes b./br. 1865	Miss Agnes br. 1850	Agnes (Family: 16-h)

Note: b. = Bay, br. = Brown, ch. = Chestnut
