= Robert the Devil (horse) =

British Thoroughbbred racehorse

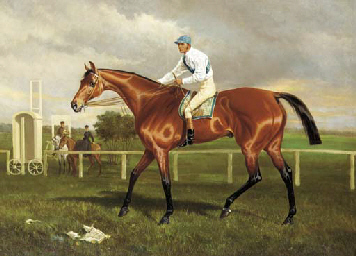
- Robert the Devil by Alfred F. de Prades
- Sire: Bertram
- Grandsire: The Duke
- Dam: Cast Off
- Damsire: The Promised Land
- Sex: Stallion
- Foaled: 1877
- Country: United Kingdom
- Colour: Bay
- Breeder: Charles Brewer
- Owner: Charles Brewer
- Trainer: Charles Blanton
- Record: 14: 10-4-0
- Earnings: £24,193

Major wins
- Grand Prix de Paris (1880); St Leger (1880); Cesarewitch Handicap (1880); Champion Stakes (1880); Alexandra Plate (1881); Ascot Gold Cup (1881)

Robert the Devil (1877–1889) was a British Thoroughbred racehorse and sire. In a career that lasted from 1879 to 1881 he ran fourteen times and won ten races. He was the leading three-year-old colt in Europe in 1880 when his wins included the Grand Prix de Paris in France and the St Leger and the Cesarewitch in England. He had a notable rivalry with the Duke of Westminster's colt Bend Or, winning three of their five racecourse meetings. Robert the Devil was regarded by contemporary observers as one of the greatest horses of the 19th century. He had limited success at stud and died in 1889.

== Background ==
Robert the Devil was a big, "slashing" bay horse standing 16.2 hands high,. He was by far the best horse sired by Bertram, a useful sprinter who won the King's Stand Stakes in 1872. Robert the Devil's dam, Cast Off, had been barren for several years before being covered by Bertram and had been living semi-wild on the Cambridgeshire fens, near Soham. He was bred by Charles Brewer, a well-known bookmaker and was trained by Charles Blanton at Upper Station Road, Newmarket, Suffolk. Brewer sold a half share in the colt to Blanton, and the pair owned him in partnership, although Brewer was usually listed as his official owner.

== Racing career ==
=== 1879: two-year-old season ===
Robert the Devil was unbeaten in two races as a two-year-old. His more significant win came on his debut at Goodwood in late July, when he beat Dora and Edelweiss in a Rous Memorial Stakes valued at £2,067 He did not reappear until the autumn when he won the £212 First October Stakes at Newmarket. He attracted enough attention to go into the winter break as a leading contender for the following year's Epsom Derby, being the 8/1 second favourite behind Bend Or.

=== 1880: three-year-old season ===
==== Spring ====
Robert the Devil continued to attract support for the Derby, being a popular choice among professional gamblers and on 6 March his odds were reported as 100/15 (approximately 6.7-1). Robert the Devil made his first appearance of the season in a £575 Biennial Stakes at Newmarket on April 13 for which he started odds-on favourite against eight opponents. Ridden by Tom Cannon, he was beaten a head by Apollo, to whom he was conceding four pounds, after a "very exciting race" with the pair finishing well clear. The defeat caused his odds for the Derby to drift out to 100/8 (12.5-1).

==== Summer ====
In the Derby on 26 May he started at 7/1 in a field of nineteen, with Bend Or being made the 2-1 favourite. The race, which was run on very firm ground, attracted the customary huge crowd. Among those in attendance many MPs, as Parliament was adjourned for the day despite the fierce objections of one member, Sir Wilfrid Lawson, who denounced the sport as "rascality and roguery". After a delay caused by the crowd overflowing onto the racecourse, Robert the Devil broke quickly and was sent into the lead by his jockey, Rossiter, with a mile to travel. He led the field down the hill and into the straight as several challengers emerged and then dropped away, and entering the final furlong he had a commanding lead and looked the likely winner. Fred Archer on Bend Or however, had been making gradual progress and sent his colt up to join the leader in the closing stages. Robert the Devil responded with a "brilliant effort", but at the line the favourite prevailed by a head after a "magnificent" finish. It was widely agreed that the riding of Archer on the winner was the main difference between the colts.

Following the race, "much excitement" was caused when an objection was lodged against the winner on the grounds that he was “not the horse he was represented to be” and that all his race entries were therefore not valid. This resulted from rumours that Bend Or had been accidentally switched with another colt named "Tadcaster" as a yearling at the Duke of Westminster's stud. The affair was described as the biggest scandal in racing since the "Running Rein" affair of 1844, when a four-year-old had been illegally entered in the Derby. The objection was rejected after a ten-day private hearing.

Shortly after his defeat at Epsom, Robert the Devil was sent to France for the 3000m Grand Prix de Paris, the most valuable race run in continental Europe. At Longchamp on 6 June he started 4/6 favourite against eight French colts for the £4,000 race. Rossiter tracked the leaders and turned into the straight in fifth place before accelerating smoothly past his rivals and winning very easily by a length from Le Destrier with Milan third. Robert the Devil's owners donated £200 from their winnings to the poor of Paris. Robert the Devil was then sent to Newmarket in July for the Midsummer Stakes in which for which he started 4/11 favourite. The filly Cipolata (receiving eleven pounds) was allowed to establish a clear lead before accelerating inside the last quarter mile and although Robert the Devil reduced the margin in the closing stages, he was still half a length behind at the finish.

==== Autumn ====
On September 15 Robert the Devil started 4/1 second favourite in a field of twelve for the St Leger at Doncaster with Bend Or the 5/4 favourite. The race was run in exceptionally wet and muddy conditions, but attracted a good attendance. Tom Cannon tracked the leaders on Robert the Devil before challenging Bend Or for the lead in the straight. He "shot clear" to win easily by three lengths from Cipolata, with Bend Or finishing sixth. His owners were reported to have taken £80,000 in winning bets on the race.

On September 28 Robert the Devil and Bend Or met for the third time in the Great Foal Stakes at Newmarket. Robert the Devil was made favourite and attempted to make all the running. Inside the final furlong he was headed by the Derby winner, but came back in the final strides to win an "intensely exciting" race by a short head. In the two and a quarter mile Cesarewitch "the greatest of English handicaps" he was originally assigned a weight of 116 pounds, but this was increased to 118 after his win in the St Leger. On October 12 he started at odds of 17/2 in a field of twenty-one. Cannon settled the colt in the early stages before moving through to take the lead inside the last quarter mile and pulled clear to win "in a canter" by four lengths from Cipolata (104), setting a weight-carrying record for a three-year-old. Two days after his handicap win he met Bend Or yet again in the Champion Stakes. Rossiter was under instructions to lead from start ("make every post a winning one") and Robert the Devil produced a performance which "astounded" the crowd, running away from his rivals to win by ten lengths. The winning time was 2:10.00, an exceptional one for the date.

At the end of the year, Robert the Devils's owners put him up for sale, but the reserve price of £15,000 was not met.

=== 1881: four-year-old season ===
Robert the Devil's 1881 campaign began with an anti-climax as no owner entered a horse to oppose him in the Rosebery Plate at Newmarket, allowing him to walk over to claim the prize money. On June 3, at the Derby meeting, Robert the Devil met Bend Or for the fifth time in the Epsom Gold Gup, over the Derby distance of one and a half miles. The Derby winner was in good form, having produced an impressive weight-carrying performance to win the City and Suburban Handicap in April. With other intended runners dropping out the race became a match, attracting extraordinary interest and provoking unprecedented scenes of excitement. Robert the Devil set off in front, and Archer followed close behind on Bend Or. Approaching the final furlong, Archer made his move, sending Bend Or into the lead. On this occasion, Robert the Devil could not respond and Bend Or appeared to have won rather more easily than the neck margin suggested.

At Royal Ascot in June, Robert the Devil ran twice. On 15 June he ran in the Gold Cup over two and a half miles, in which his opponents included the 1880 2000 Guineas winner Petronel and the American-bred three-year-old Foxhall who had recently won the Grand Prix de Paris. Robert the Devil took the lead entering the straight and drew clear to win very easily by five lengths from Petronel. Two days later at the same meeting he won the Alexandra Plate over three miles.

Robert the Devil did not race again and his retirement was announced in the autumn.

== Assessment ==
In May 1886 The Sporting Times carried out a poll of one hundred racing experts to create a ranking of the best British racehorses of the 19th century. Robert the Devil was ranked tenth, having been placed in the top ten by thirty-one of the contributors (Bend Or finished 22nd). Robert the Devil earned £18,970 in 1880. and £3,004 in the following year. His class and consistency made him "the most popular horse to have run at Newmarket for many years." At the end of his three-year-old season he was acclaimed as "the best three-year-old we have seen for many a year."

== Stud career ==
Robert the Devil went to stud with a valuation of £9,000 and stood ar a fee of £50. He had limited success at stud. His best runners included Chittabob (Champagne Stakes), El Diablo (Lowther Stakes) and Van Dieman's Land (third in Epsom Derby). Robert the Devil died in spring 1889 at Beenham stud in Berkshire. After his death, Robert the Devil was stuffed and is still on display at Gibson's saddlery in Newmarket.

== Pedigree ==
Pedigree of Robert the Devil (GB), bay stallion, 1877
Sire Bertram (GB) 1869	The Duke; 1862	Stockwell	The Baron
Sire Bertram (GB) 1869	The Duke; 1862	Stockwell	Pocahontas
Sire Bertram (GB) 1869	The Duke; 1862	Bay Celia	Orlando
Sire Bertram (GB) 1869	The Duke; 1862	Bay Celia	Hersey
Sire Bertram (GB) 1869	Constance; 1852	Faugh-a-Ballagh	Sir Hercules
Sire Bertram (GB) 1869	Constance; 1852	Faugh-a-Ballagh	Guiccioli
Sire Bertram (GB) 1869	Constance; 1852	Milk Maid	Glaucus
Sire Bertram (GB) 1869	Constance; 1852	Milk Maid	Dame Durdan
Dam Cast Off (GB) 1866	The Promised Land; 1856	Jericho	Jerry
Dam Cast Off (GB) 1866	The Promised Land; 1856	Jericho	Turquoise
Dam Cast Off (GB) 1866	The Promised Land; 1856	Glee	Touchstone
Dam Cast Off (GB) 1866	The Promised Land; 1856	Glee	Harmony
Dam Cast Off (GB) 1866	Wanona; 1854	Womersley	Birdcatcher
Dam Cast Off (GB) 1866	Wanona; 1854	Womersley	Cinizelli
Dam Cast Off (GB) 1866	Wanona; 1854	Hampton mare	Hampton
Dam Cast Off (GB) 1866	Wanona; 1854	Hampton mare	Cervantes mare (Family: 1-a)
