= Joseph Lawson (trainer) =

Personal information
- Born: 1881 Marsden, County Durham, United Kingdom
- Died: 1964 (aged 82–83)
- Occupation: Trainer

Horse racing career
- Sport: Horse racing

Major racing wins
- British Classic Race wins as trainer: 2000 Guineas (4); 1000 Guineas (3); Epsom Derby (1); Epsom Oaks (3); St Leger (1)

Racing awards
- British flat racing Champion Trainer (1931), (1936)

Significant horses
- Orwell, Mannamead, Exhibitionnist, Galatea, Kingsway, Court Martial, Never Say Die

Joseph Lawson (1881–1964) was a British trainer of racehorses. Lawson rose from a position on the staff at Alec Taylor Jr.'s stable to become one of the most successful British trainers of the mid 20th century. He trained the winners of twelve British Classic Races and was British flat racing Champion Trainer on two occasions.

== Background ==
Joseph Lawson was born in 1881 at Boldon Gint, near Marsden, County Durham. He worked as a farm labourer before beginning a career in horse racing.

== Early career ==
Lawson began his career as an apprentice jockey to his local trainer Thomas Barrasford at Marsden Hall. He began riding in races in 1897, but his career as a jockey was brief one, as his rising weight made him uncompetitive. He moved to Wiltshire where he joined the staff at the stables of Alec Taylor Jr. at Manton. Lawson eventually took on the role travelling head lad, meaning that he was responsible for the condition and welfare of horses at race meetings when Taylor himself could not be present. He was later designated assistant trainer and when Taylor retired in 1927, Lawson took over as the trainer at Manton.

== Training career ==
Lawson inherited the patronage of several leading owners from Taylor and attracted several others. In his second full season of training he sent out Lord Astor's filly Pennycomequick to win the Epsom Oaks. Two years later, Lawson's stable won £93,899 in prize money, setting a record which stood for 26 years and giving him his first trainers' championship. His biggest winners that season were the Ascot Gold Cup winner Trimdon and the champion two-year-old Orwell. Lawson's success continued through the 1930s, with his other major winners including Pay Up (2000 Guineas), Rhodes Scholar (Eclipse Stakes), Exhibitionnist and Galatea. The successes of Pay Up and Rhodes Scholar in 1936 gave Lawson his second trainers' title.

During the Second World War, Lawson's team was strengthened by the arrival of the horses owned by Lord Glanely, who closed down his private stable at the outbreak of hostilities. Lawson's wartime winners included the 2000 Guineas winners Kingsway and Court Martial and Glanely's filly Dancing Time, which won the 1000 Guineas in 1941.

In 1945, Lawson left Manton after being advised by doctors that he needed to "restrict his activities". Instead of retiring however, he relocated to Newmarket at the age of 66, where he took over the running of the Carlburg stable in 1947. Seven years later, Lawson recorded the most important victory of his training career when Never Say Die won the 1954 Epsom Derby.

== Retirement ==
Lawson retired from training in 1957 and lived at Newmarket until his death in 1964.
