= The Bard (British horse) =

British-bred Thoroughbred racehorse

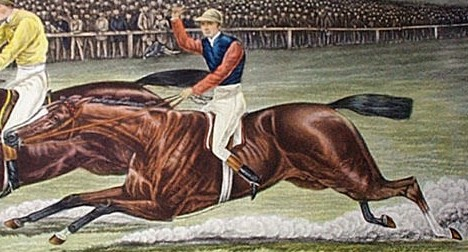
- Engraving of The Bard racing at Epsom Downs in the 1886 Derby
- Sire: Petrarch
- Grandsire: Lord Clifden
- Dam: Magdalene
- Damsire: Syrian
- Sex: Stallion
- Foaled: 1883
- Country: Great Britain
- Colour: Chestnut
- Owner: Robert Peck; Owen Williams
- Trainer: Robert Peck
- Record: 25: 23-2-0

Major wins
- Brocklesby Stakes (1885); Goodwood Cup (1886); Doncaster Cup (1886)

Awards
- Leading sire in France (1894, 1901)

The Bard (1883–1902) was a British Thoroughbred racehorse. He was owned by Robert Peck and Owen Williams. Robert Peck was also his trainer. He won 23 of his 25 races, including the Goodwood Cup and Doncaster Cup in 1886. He also finished second in to Ormonde in The Derby.

== Background ==
The Bard was a light-coloured chestnut standing just over 15 hands high. He was a son of 2000 Guineas and St. Leger Stakes winner Petrarch. After retiring from racing Petrarch had success as a sire, with his progeny including Busybody and Miss Jummy. The Bard's dam was Magdalene. She was a race winner and a daughter of Syrian.

== Racing career ==
The Bard was undefeated as a two-year-old, winning 16 races including the Brocklesby Stakes, and £9188 in prize money. His record for the most wins in a season by a British juvenile was not equaled until Provideo won 16 times in 1984. In his first race as a three-year-old he faced 2000 Guineas winner Ormonde in the 1886 Epsom Derby. Ormonde was the 40/85 favourite and The Bard was the 7/2 second favourite. Halfway down the finishing straight The Bard, ridden by Charles Wood, was slightly in front of Ormonde, but as soon as Ormonde's jockey asked for an effort he went clear. Ormonde went on to win the race by 1½ lengths from The Bard, who was about 10 lengths clear of St. Mirin in third. The Bard then won the Goodwood Cup in a walkover and won the Doncaster Cup.

== Stud career ==
In 1887 he was sold for 10,000 guineas to Henri Say for breeding and he was a successful stallion in France, becoming champion sire there in 1894 and 1901. He died at Lormoy Stud in France on 14 March 1902.

== Sire line tree ==
- The Bard
  - Berenger
  - The Minstrel
  - Madcap
    - Lieutel
    - Dor
  - St Michel
  - Gouvernail
  - Launay
    - Rab Joie
  - Indian Chief
  - Longbow
  - Vidame
  - Maigstral
  - Thibet
    - Titus
  - Monsieur Amedee
  - Royal
  - Neflier
  - Saxon
  - Tibere
  - Monsieur Charvet
  - Tarquin
    - Matchless

== See also ==
- List of leading Thoroughbred racehorses
