= Queen Alexandra Stakes =

- Class: Conditions
- Location: Ascot Racecourse; Ascot, England
- Inaugurated: 1864
- Race type: Flat / Thoroughbred
- Website: Ascot

Race information
- Distance: 2m 5f 143y (4355m)
- Surface: Turf
- Track: Right-handed
- Qualification: Four-years-old and up
- Weight: 9 st 0 lb (4yo); 9 st 2 lb (5yo+); Allowances; 5 lb for fillies and mares Penalties; 5 lb for each Class 1 win * 3 lb for each Class 2 / 3 win * * since 19 June last year excluding handicap races (cumulative to max. of 10lb)
- Purse: £100,000 (2022); 1st: £54,000 (2022)

Queen Alexandra Stakes
2026
Illinois	French Master	Mr Hollywood

Previous years
2025
Sober	Samui	Wild Waves
2024
Uxmal	Run For Oscar	Dawn Rising
2023
Dawn Rising	The Grand Visir	Run For Oscar
2022
Stratum	Reshoun	Calling The Wind
2021
Stratum	Calling The Wind	The Grand Visir

2020-2011
2020
Who Dares Wins	The Grand Visir	Mukha Magic
2019
Cleonte	Pallasator	Max Dynamite
2018
Pallasator	Renneti	Count Octave
2017
Oriental Fox	Thomas Hobson	Us Army Ranger
2016
Commissioned	Cayirli	Clondaw Warrior
2015
Oriental Fox	Taws	Teak
2014
Pique Sous	El Salvador	Brass Ring
2013
Chiberta King	Shahwardi	Seaside Sizzler
2012
Simenon	Shahwardi	Romeo Montague
2011
Swingkeel	Elyaadi	Ajaan

2010-2001
2010
Bergo	Aajel	Swingkeel
2009
Caracciola	Tyrrells Wood	Amerigo
2008
Honolulu	Distinction	Metaphoric
2007
Enjoy The Moment	Baddam	Golden Quest
2006
Baddam	Cover Up	Vinando
2005
Cruzspiel	Cover Up	Al Eile
2004
Corrib Eclipse	Dancing Bay	Romany Prince
2003
Cover Up	Tamiami Trail	Double Honour
2002
Cover Up	Archduke Ferdinand	Double Honour
2001
Life Is Life	Kahtan	Dorans Pride

2000-1991
2000
Dominant Duchess	Three Cheers	Spirit Of Love
1999
San Sebastian	Jaseur	Canon Can
1998
Dovedon Star	Yorkshire	Lord Jim
1997
Canon Can	Old Rouvel	Daraydan
1996
Admiral's Well	Speed To Lead	Old Rouvel
1995
Cuff Link	Dover Patrol	Great Marquess
1994
Cuff Link	Kassab	Balasani
1993
Riszard	Jack Button	Miss Plum
1992
Romany Rye	Gondolier	Great Marquess
1991
Easy To Please	Nomadic Way	Parting Moment

1990-1982
1990
Regal Reform	Mill Pond	Ecran
1989
Ala Hounak	Sergeyevich	Zero Watt
1988
Overdrive	Excellenza	Harlestone Lake
1987
Sprowston Boy	Naevog	Should Never Be
1985
Valuable Witness	Ravaro	Real Pegus
1979
John Cherry	Billion	Mandalus

The Queen Alexandra Stakes is a flat horse race in Great Britain open to horses aged four years or older. It is run at Ascot each June over a distance of 2 miles, 5 furlongs and 143 yards (4355 metres). The longest flat race in the United Kingdom, it was once the longest professional flat race in the world, before being usurped by the 4,600-metre Jericho Cup at Warrnambool in Australia.

== History ==
The event is named after Alexandra of Denmark. It was established in 1864, and it was originally called the Alexandra Plate. It later became known as the Alexandra Stakes, and it was given its current title in 1931. It was formerly contested over 2 miles, 6 furlongs and 34 yards, but it was shortened as a result of the realignment of Ascot's track in 2005.

The Queen Alexandra Stakes is traditionally the last race on the final day of the five-day Royal Ascot meeting. It sometimes features horses which ran on the opening day in the Ascot Stakes, and the most recent to win both in the same year was Simenon in 2012.

It is Britain's longest professional flat race, with a distance 21 yards longer than that of the Pontefract Marathon Handicap at Pontefract. The extreme length can attract a varied field, and it often includes horses from hurdle racing.

== Records ==
Most successful horse (6 wins):

- Brown Jack – 1929, 1930, 1931, 1932, 1933, 1934

Leading jockey since 1900 (7 wins):

- Ryan Moore - Bergo (2010), Simenon (2012), Pique Sous (2014), Stratum (2021), Dawn Rising (2023), Sober (2025), Illinois (2026)

Leading trainer since 1900 (6 wins):

- Ivor Anthony - Brown Jack 1929, 1930, 1931, 1932, 1933, 1934)

(5 wins):

- Willie Mullins - Simenon (2012), Pique Sous (2014), Stratum (2021, 2022), Sober (2025)

== Winners since 1900 ==
Year	Winner	Age	Jockey	Trainer	Time
1900	Gadfly	4	Lester Reiff	Fred Day	6:09.60
1901	Kilmarnock II	4	Lester Reiff	John Huggins	5:23.00
1902	William the Third	4	Mornington Cannon	John Porter	5:18.00
1903	Arizona	4	William Pratt	St Alary
1904	Zinfandel	4	Mornington Cannon	Charles Beatty
1905	Hammerkop	5	Bernard Dillon	Peter Gilpin
1906	Hammerkop	6	Bernard Dillon	Peter Gilpin
1907	Torpoint	7	Otto Madden	Alec Taylor Jr.
1908	Torpoint	8	Billy Higgs	Alec Taylor Jr.	5:15.00
1909	Pure Gem	5	Walter Griggs	Charles Morton
1910	Lagos	5	Bernard Dillon	Samuel Pickering
1911	Royal Realm	6	Walter Earl	Andy Fergusson
1912	Jackdaw	4	William Saxby	G Pirie
1913	Rivoli	4	William Saxby	Richard Dawson	5:04.60
1914	Fiz-Yama	5	Fred Herbert	Major John Morris	5:01.80
1915–18	No Race
1919	St Eloi	7	Bernard Carslake	Ossie Bell
1920	Haki	8	Joe Childs	Alec Taylor Jr.	5:06.40
1921	Spearwort	4	Hector Gray	Felix Leach	5:18.80
1922	Air Balloon	5	Joe Childs	Alec Taylor Jr.	4:55.00
1923	Bucks Hussar	4	Bernard Carslake	Reg Day	5:39.80
1924	Rose Prince	5	Frank O'Neill	Sam Darling Jr.	5:18.40
1925	Seclin	4	Freddy Lane	In France	5:00.00
1926	Vermilion Pencil	4	Charlie Smirke	Richard Dawson	5:38.40
1927	Finglas	4	Charlie Elliott	Peter Gilpin	5:05.20
1928	Finglas	5	Charlie Elliott	Peter Gilpin	5:35.20
1929	Brown Jack	5	Steve Donoghue	Ivor Anthony	5:02.40
1930	Brown Jack	6	Steve Donoghue	Ivor Anthony	5:31.00
1931	Brown Jack	7	Steve Donoghue	Ivor Anthony	5:23.60
1932	Brown Jack	8	Steve Donoghue	Ivor Anthony	5:01.00
1933	Brown Jack	9	Steve Donoghue	Ivor Anthony	5:16.20
1934	Brown Jack	10	Steve Donoghue	Ivor Anthony	5:00.60
1935	Enfield	4	Michael Beary	Cecil Boyd-Rochfort	5:10.20
1936	Cecil	5	Tommy Weston	Joseph Lawson	5:12.60
1937	Valerian	4	Tommy Weston	Joseph Lawson	5:22.40
1938	Epigram	5	Bernard Carslake	Noel Cannon	5:14.60
1939	Pretender II	5	G Delaurie	In France	5:36.80
1940–45	No Race
1946	Marsyas II	6	Charlie Elliott	Charles Semblat	5:10.60
1947	Monsieur l'Amiral	6	Charlie Smirke	In France	5:02.80
1948	Vulgan	5	Rae Johnstone	John de Moraville	5:36.60
1949	Alindrake	4	Paul Blanc	In France	4:56.20
1950	Aldborough	5	Gordon Richards	Fulke Walwyn	5:01.20
1951	Strathspey	6	Scobie Breasley	Noel Cannon	5:15.00
1952	Medway	4	Doug Smith	Fred Winter Sr.	5:20.40
1953	Lord Fox	4	Charlie Smirke	Marcus Marsh	5:12.80
1954	Bitter Sweet	5	Harry Carr	Frank Hudson	5:14.80
1955	Bitter Sweet	6	Harry Carr	Frank Hudson	5:27.04
1956	Borghetto	5	Rae Johnstone	Donald Watson	5:14.10
1957	Flying Flag II	4	Leon Flavien	Jean Laumain	5:08.65
1958	Rally	6	Joe Mercer	Robert Colling	5:30.66
1959	Bali Ha'i III	6	Harry Carr	Cecil Boyd-Rochfort	5:40.73
1960	Predominate	8	Eph Smith	Ted Leader	5:03.66
1961	Moss Bank	5	Bill Williamson	Thomas O'Brien	5:13.62
1962	Trelawny	6	Scobie Breasley	George Todd	5:39.50
1963	Trelawny	7	Scobie Breasley	George Todd	5:07.84
1964	Abandoned due to waterlogging
1965	Grey Of Falloden	6	Joe Mercer	Dick Hern	5:13.44
1966	Panic	5	Johnny Roe	John Oxx	5:14.09
1967	Alciglide	4	Bill Williamson	Seamus McGrath	5:21.58
1968	Tubalcain	7	Geoff Lewis	Ted Goddard	5:31.52
1969	Laurence O	4	Bill Williamson	Seamus McGrath	5:37.85
1970	Parthenon	4	Greville Starkey	Henry Cecil	4:57.80
1971	Hickleton	5	Lester Piggott	Barry Hills	5:34.07
1972	Celtic Cone	5	Brian Taylor	Frank Cundell	5:00.31
1973	Peacock	5	Tony Murray	Ryan Price	5:19.41
1974	King Levanstell	4	Tony Murray	Ryan Price	4:59.72
1975	Cumbernauld	8	Bruce Raymond	Ben Hanbury	4:57.95
1976	Coed Cochion	4	Paul Cook	Jeremy Hindley	4:55.01
1977	John Cherry	6	Lester Piggott	Harry Thomson Jones	5:09.87
1978	Mountain Cross	6	John Lowe	Bill Watts	5:16.04
1979	John Cherry	8	Greville Starkey	Harry Thomson Jones	5:07.40
1980	Balinger	4	Willie Carson	Dick Hern	4:58.19
1981	Donegal Prince	5	Paddy Young	Paul Kelleway	5:12.74
1982	Ore	4	Bruce Raymond	Kevin Prendergast	4:57.70
1983	Sandalay	5	Willie Carson	Peter Cundell	5:03.07
1984	Erins Invader	7	Declan Gillespie	Hugh McCaffrey	5:04.43
1985	Valuable Witness	5	Pat Eddery	Jeremy Tree	5:13.15
1986	Otabari	4	Richard Quinn	Paul Cole	4:51.32
1987	Sprowston Boy	4	Gay Kelleway	Paul Kelleway	5:21.58
1988	Overdrive	4	Steve Cauthen	Henry Cecil	5:01.91
1989	Ala Hounak	5	Billy Newnes	Frankie Durr	5:00.63
1990	Regal Reform	7	Dean McKeown	George M. Moore	5:05.65
1991	Easy to Please	4	Christy Roche	Jim Bolger	5:01.10
1992	Romany Rye	4	Walter Swinburn	Geoff Wragg	4:54.15
1993	Riszard	4	Christy Roche	Jim Bolger	5:18.57
1994	Cuff Link	4	Pat Eddery	Dick Hern	4:57.66
1995	Cuff Link	5	Paul Eddery	Dick Hern	4:56.73
1996	Admiral's Well	6	Richard Quinn	Reg Akehurst	4:52.05
1997	Canon Can	4	Kieren Fallon	Henry Cecil	5:07.37
1998	Dovedon Star	4	Frankie Dettori	Anthony Kelleway	5:02.44
1999	San Sebastian	5	Michael Kinane	Michael Grassick	4:55.32
2000	Dominant Duchess	6	Richard Quinn	John Hills	4:56.57
2001	Life Is Life	5	Philip Robinson	Michael Jarvis	4:51.26
2002	Cover Up	5	Kieren Fallon	Sir Michael Stoute	4:53.89
2003	Cover Up	6	Kieren Fallon	Sir Michael Stoute	4:47.89
2004	Corrib Eclipse	5	John Egan	Jamie Poulton	4:57.41
2005 ^{[a]}	Cruzspiel	5	Johnny Murtagh	James Fanshawe	4:47.15
2006	Baddam	4	Ian Mongan	Mick Channon	5:04.06
2007	Enjoy the Moment	4	Jamie Spencer	Jamie Osborne	4:56.25
2008	Honolulu	4	Johnny Murtagh	Aidan O'Brien	4:49.07
2009	Caracciola	12	Eddie Ahern	Nicky Henderson	4:53.90
2010	Bergo	7	Ryan Moore	Gary L. Moore	4:47.79
2011	Swingkeel	6	Ted Durcan	John Dunlop	5:02.73
2012	Simenon	5	Ryan Moore	Willie Mullins	4:48.67
2013	Chiberta King	7	Jimmy Fortune	Andrew Balding	4:51.49
2014	Pique Sous	7	Ryan Moore	Willie Mullins	4:49.82
2015	Oriental Fox	7	Joe Fanning	Mark Johnston	4:45.67
2016	Commissioned	6	Adam Kirby	Gordon Elliott	5:00.77
2017	Oriental Fox	9	Joe Fanning	Mark Johnston	4:49.09
2018	Pallasator	9	Jamie Spencer	Gordon Elliott	4:45.24
2019	Cleonte	6	Silvestre de Sousa	Andrew Balding	4:51.22
2020	Who Dares Wins	8	Tom Marquand	Alan King	4:59.88
2021	Stratum	8	Ryan Moore	Willie Mullins	4:57.04
2022	Stratum	9	William Buick	Willie Mullins	4:54.69
2023	Dawn Rising	6	Ryan Moore	Joseph O'Brien	4:53.66
2024	Uxmal	5	Dylan Browne McMonagle	Joseph O'Brien	4:48.00
2025	Sober	6	Ryan Moore	Willie Mullins	4:48.04
2026	Illinois	5	Ryan Moore	Aidan O'Brien	4:45.57

^{a} The 2005 running took place at York.

== Earlier winners ==
- 1865: Fille de l'Air
- 1867: Lecturer
- 1868: Blinkhoolie
- 1869: Restitution
- 1870: Trocadero
- 1871: Rosicrucian
- 1872: Musket
- 1873: Cremorne
- 1874: King Lud
- 1875: Doncaster
- 1876: Freeman
- 1877: Coltness
- 1878: Verneuil
- 1879: Insulaire
- 1880: Thurio
- 1881: Robert the Devil
- 1882: Fiddler
- 1883: Faugh-a-Ballagh
- 1884: Corrie Roy
- 1885: St Gatien
- 1886: Blue Grass
- 1888: Timothy
- 1889: Trayles
- 1890: Netheravon
- 1891: Gonsalvo
- 1892: Blue-green
- 1893: Bushey Park
- 1894: Aborigine
- 1895: Ravensbury
- 1896: Pride
- 1897: St Bris
- 1898: Piety
- 1899: Le Senateur

== See also ==
- Horse racing in Great Britain
- List of British flat horse races
- Recurring sporting events established in 1864 – this race is included under its original title, Alexandra Plate.
