= Lily Agnes =

British-bred Thoroughbred racehorse

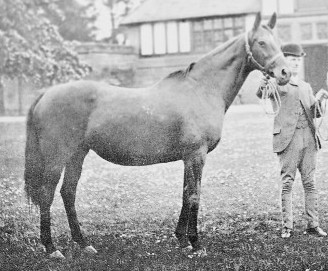
- Photo of Lily Agnes
- Sire: Macaroni
- Grandsire: Sweetmeat
- Dam: Polly Agnes
- Damsire: The Cure
- Sex: Mare
- Foaled: 1871
- Country: England
- Colour: Bay
- Breeder: James Snarry
- Owner: James Snarry
- Record: 32: 21 wins

Major wins
- Northumberland Plate (1874); Doncaster Cup (1874); Ebor Handicap (1875)

Honours
- Lily Agnes Stakes at Chester Racecourse

Lily Agnes (1871–1899) is an English Thoroughbred racehorse. On the track she won 21 races including the Northumberland Plate, Doncaster Cup and Ebor Handicap. She is best known for being the dam of unbeaten Triple Crown winner Ormonde, but she also produced a number of other top foals. When she was in training she was described as "a light-fleshed, ragged hipped, lop-eared filly".

== Race career ==
Lily Agnes was the daughter of 2000 Guineas and Epsom Derby winner Macaroni, out of Polly Agnes who had been given to James Snarry by Sir Tatton Sykes. As a two-year-old Lily Agnes won all of her six starts. As a three-year-old she won seven of her ten starts, her victories included the Northumberland Plate and Doncaster Cup. She won a further eight races, including the Ebor Handicap at York.

== Stud career ==
Her owner James Snarry died in 1877. Lily Agnes went on to become one of the top broodmares producing a number of good racehorses and broodmares. After Lily Agnes visited Doncaster the Duke of Westminster decided to buy her, paying £2500.

=== Foals ===
c = colt, f = filly

Foaled	Name	Sex	Sire	Major Wins
1878	Narcissus	c	Speculum
1880	Eastern Lily	f	Speculum
1881	Rossington	c	Doncaster
1882	Farewell	f	Doncaster	1000 Guineas
1883	Ormonde	c	Bend Or	Dewhurst Plate, 2000 Guineas, Epsom Derby, St. James's Palace Stakes, Hardwicke Stakes (twice), St. Leger Stakes, Great Foal Stakes, Champion Stakes, Rous Memorial Stakes, Imperial Gold Cup
1884	Welfare	f	Doncaster
1885	Ossory	c	Bend Or	St. James's Palace Stakes, Prince of Wales's Stakes
1886	Fleur de Lys	f	Bend Or
1887	Ornament	f	Bend Or
1889	Arklow	c	Bend Or
1894	Orelio	c	Bend Or

Rossington sired Good and Plenty. Ormonde sired two time Eclipse Stakes winner Orme. Ornament was the dam of Champion Stakes winner Labrador and champion filly Sceptre who won four British Classic Races.

Lily Agnes died in June 1899 at the age of 28 at Eaton stud after becoming infirm in her old age.

The Lily Agnes Conditions Stakes at Chester Racecourse is a class 2 five furlong race named after her and is run during the May meeting.

== Pedigree ==
Pedigree of Lily Agnes, bay mare, 1871
Sire Macaroni b. 1860	Sweetmeat b./br. 1842	Gladiator ch. 1833	Partisan
Sire Macaroni b. 1860	Sweetmeat b./br. 1842	Gladiator ch. 1833	Pauline
Sire Macaroni b. 1860	Sweetmeat b./br. 1842	Lollypop; 1836	Voltaire
Sire Macaroni b. 1860	Sweetmeat b./br. 1842	Lollypop; 1836	Belinda
Sire Macaroni b. 1860	Jocose b. 1843	Pantaloon ch. 1824	Castrel
Sire Macaroni b. 1860	Jocose b. 1843	Pantaloon ch. 1824	Idalia
Sire Macaroni b. 1860	Jocose b. 1843	Banter br. 1826	Master Henry
Sire Macaroni b. 1860	Jocose b. 1843	Banter br. 1826	Boadicea
Dam Polly Agnes b./br. 1865	The Cure b. 1841	Physician b. 1829	Brutandorf
Dam Polly Agnes b./br. 1865	The Cure b. 1841	Physician b. 1829	Primette
Dam Polly Agnes b./br. 1865	The Cure b. 1841	Morsel; 1836	Mulatto
Dam Polly Agnes b./br. 1865	The Cure b. 1841	Morsel; 1836	Linda
Dam Polly Agnes b./br. 1865	Miss Agnes br. 1850	Birdcatcher ch. 1833	Sir Hercules
Dam Polly Agnes b./br. 1865	Miss Agnes br. 1850	Birdcatcher ch. 1833	Guiccioli
Dam Polly Agnes b./br. 1865	Miss Agnes br. 1850	Agnes b./br. 1844	Clarion
Dam Polly Agnes b./br. 1865	Miss Agnes br. 1850	Agnes b./br. 1844	Annette

Note: b. = Bay, br. = Brown, ch. = Chestnut
