= Ormonde (horse) =

British-bred Thoroughbred racehorse

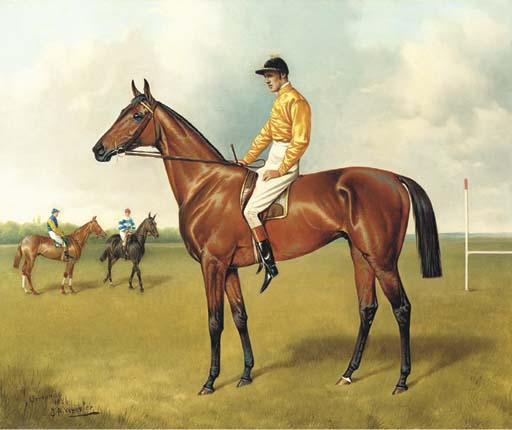
- Ormonde, with Fred Archer up
- Sire: Bend Or
- Grandsire: Doncaster
- Dam: Lily Agnes
- Damsire: Macaroni
- Sex: Stallion
- Foaled: 18 March 1883
- Died: 21 May 1904 (aged 21)
- Country: Great Britain
- Colour: Bay
- Breeder: Hugh Grosvenor, 1st Duke of Westminster
- Owner: Hugh Grosvenor, 1st Duke of Westminster
- Trainer: John Porter
- Jockey: Fred Archer; George Barrett; Tom Cannon
- Record: 16: 16–0–0
- Earnings: £28,465

Major wins
- Dewhurst Plate (1885); 2000 Guineas (1886); Epsom Derby (1886); St. James's Palace Stakes (1886); Hardwicke Stakes (1886, 1887); St. Leger Stakes (1886); Great Foal Stakes (1886); Champion Stakes (1886); Rous Memorial Stakes (1887); Imperial Gold Cup (1887)

Awards
- 4th U.K. Triple Crown Winner

Honours
- Ormonde Stakes at Chester Racecourse
- Last updated on 28 August 2012

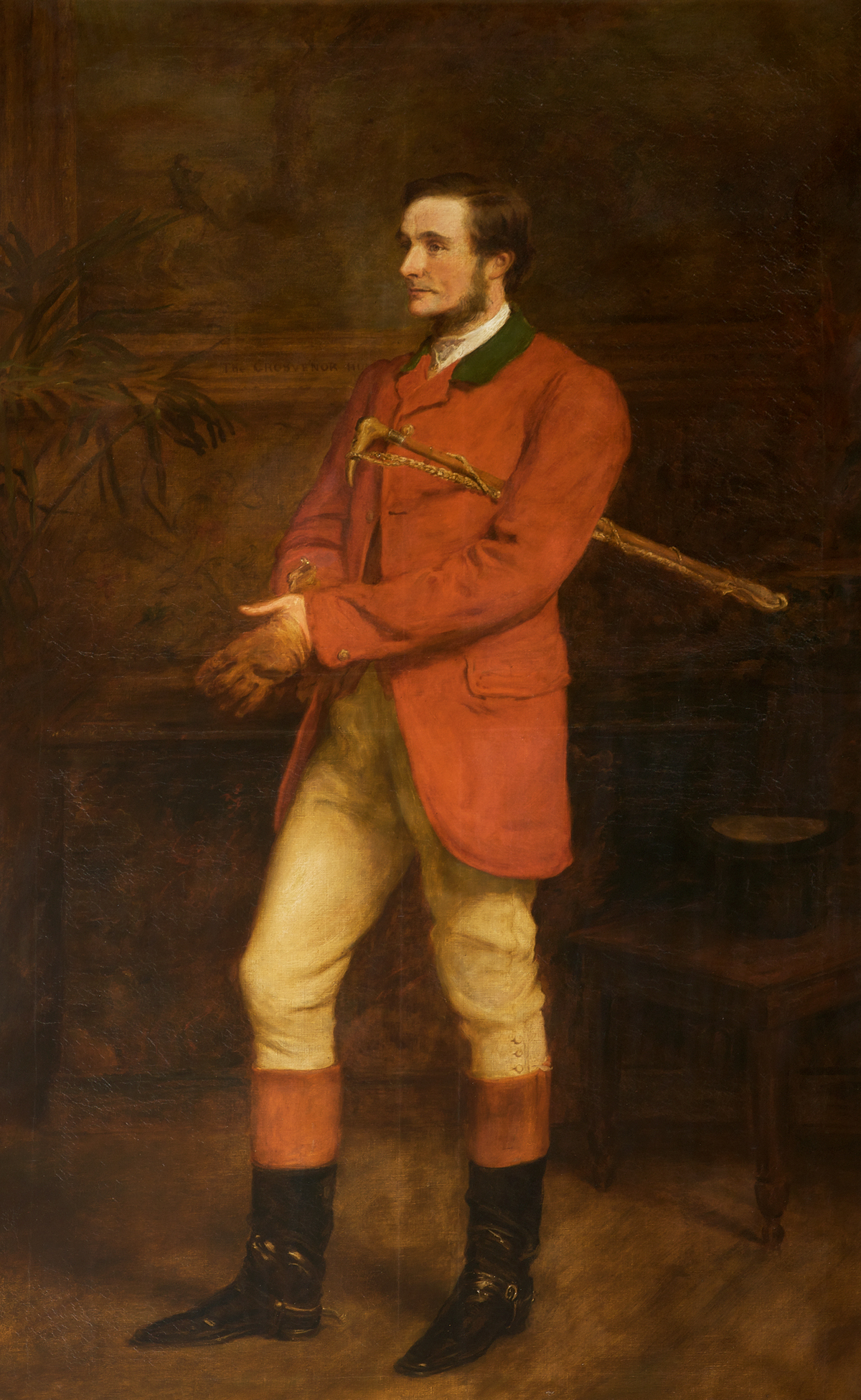
Hugh Grosvenor (1st Duke of Westminster), the owner of Ormonde

Ormonde (18 March 1883–21 May 1904) was an undefeated English Thoroughbred racehorse who won the 1886 English Triple Crown and was labelled the 'horse of the century' at the time. He also won the St. James's Palace Stakes, Champion Stakes and the Hardwicke Stakes twice. Ormonde was trained at Kingsclere by John Porter for the 1st Duke of Westminster. His regular jockeys were Fred Archer and Tom Cannon. After retiring from racing he suffered fertility problems, but still sired Orme, who won the Eclipse Stakes twice.

== Background ==
Ormonde was a bay colt, bred by Hugh Grosvenor, 1st Duke of Westminster and foaled in 1883 at Eaton Stud in Cheshire. Ormonde's sire was The Derby and Champion Stakes winner Bend Or, also bred by the Duke. Bend Or was a successful stallion, his progeny included Kendal, Ossory, Orbit, Orion, Orvieto, Bona Vista and Laveno.

Ormonde's dam was Doncaster Cup winner Lily Agnes. She was sired by another Derby winner, Macaroni. Lily Agnes began to experience problems with her lungs as a four-year-old, to the extent that jockey John Osborne said he could hear her approaching before he saw her. The problem did not interfere with her racing ability as she continued to win at four and five. She then became a top broodmare also foaling 1000 Guineas winner Farewell, Ormonde's full-brother Ossory and another full-brother Ornament, who produced the outstanding Sceptre, the only racehorse to win four British Classic Races outright.

Ormonde was born at half-past six in the evening of 18 March 1883. The Duke's stud-groom Richard Chapman stated that for several months after foaling, Ormonde was over at the knee. Chapman later said he had never before or since seen a horse with the characteristic so pronounced and that it had seemed impossible for him to ever grow straight. Ormonde did gradually grow out of the problem though and by the time he left the stud to go into training at Kingsclere, trainer John Porter told the Duke he was the best yearling the Duke had sent him. However, during the winter of 1884/85, Ormonde had trouble with his knees. The treatment he received for this held his training back considerably, with him only having easy cantering exercises until the summer of 1885.

Ormonde grew into a well-built horse standing 16 hands (64 inches, 163 cm) with excellent bone and straight hocks. Porter later said his neck "was the most muscular I ever saw a Thoroughbred possess." He had an excellent shoulder and short powerful hindquarters that led some to call him a racing machine. When galloping, he held his head low and had a notably long stride. He had a kind temperament, healthy appetite and strong constitution. Porter stated the horse was fond of flowers and would even eat the boutonniere from the jacket of anyone within reach.

== Racing career ==
=== 1885: Two-year-old season ===
Prior to his racecourse debut, Porter ran Ormonde in a trial against Kendal, Whipper-in and Whitefriar. Kendal, carrying one pound less, won the trial by a length from Ormonde. Kendal had already had a number of races by this point and Ormonde was nowhere near fully fit. By this point he stood 16 hands high and had a very muscular neck and strong back. Porter also noted that when extended, Ormonde had a very long stride. The Duke rode him in a couple of canters and remarked "I felt every moment that I was going to be shot over his head, his propelling power is so terrific."

As a two-year-old, Ormonde did not race until October when he won the Post Sweepstakes race at Newmarket. He started at 5/4 with the filly Modwena, who had won eight races out of ten that year, the 5/6 favourite. In the heavy going, Ormonde went on to win by a length from Modwena. Ormonde's next racecourse appearance came in the Criterion Stakes, again at Newmarket, where his opposition included Oberon and Mephisto. Starting at 4/6, Ormonde won easily by three lengths from Oberon, with Mephisto a distant third. He then started the Dewhurst Plate as the 4/11 favourite, ridden by Fred Archer. After an even start, Ormonde was positioned just behind the leader. As they neared the closing stages, Archer let Ormonde go and he quickly pulled away from the field to beat his stablemate, Whitefriar, easily by four lengths. The field also included Miss Jummy, who went on to win the 1000 Guineas and Epsom Oaks. These three victories earned him £3008. 1885 was considered to have had the best group of two-year-olds for many years.

=== 1886: Three-year-old season ===
Going into the 1886 season, Ormonde was one of the favourites for the Derby. He was priced at 11/2, similar to Minting, Saraband and The Bard.

==== 2000 Guineas ====
Ormonde started off his three-year-old campaign in the 2000 Guineas at Newmarket. The race was considered a clash between Ormonde, the unbeaten Middle Park winner Minting and Saraband. In a small field of six, Minting was sent off the 11/10 favourite, Saraband at 3/1 and Ormonde at 7/2. This time Ormonde was ridden by George Barrett, with Fred Archer riding Saraband. The horses ran almost in line in the early stages. Saraband began to struggle and was beaten with two furlongs to run. At this point Ormonde and Minting took over the lead from St. Mirin. Ormonde then went on to record an easy 2 length victory over Minting, with Mephisto a further 10 lengths back in third, who in turn was two lengths ahead of Saraband.

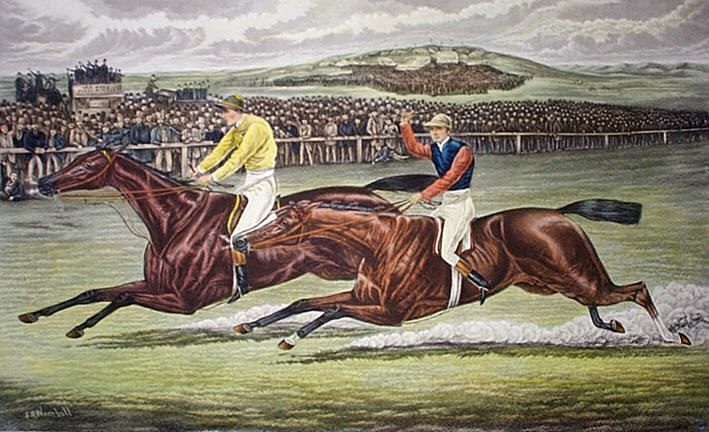
Engraving of the closing stages of the 1886 Derby, with Ormonde leading The Bard

==== The Derby ====
After his Newmarket performance, Ormonde was the favourite for the Derby with Fred Archer back as his jockey. A small field of 9 went to post, with Ormonde the 40/85 favourite and his main opposition, The Bard, at 7/2. The Bard was also undefeated and had won many races as a two-year-old. The start was not even, with outsider Coracle almost 6 lengths clear of Ormonde, who was a similar distance clear of the rest. Ormonde and The Bard took over the lead at Tattenham corner and the two raced up the straight. The Bard got a neck in front, but when Archer asked Ormonde for an effort, he pulled in front to win by 1½ lengths from The Bard, with St. Mirin a further 10 lengths back in third.

==== Royal Ascot ====
At Royal Ascot against just two opponents, Ormonde lined up as the 3/100 favourite for the St. James's Palace Stakes. He won easily by ¾ length from Calais. Three days later he faced a stronger field in the Hardwicke Stakes including 1885 Derby and St Leger winner Melton. Ormonde, the 30/100 favourite, won easily again though, beating Melton by 2 lengths. He then had a break from the racecourse. After Ascot Ormonde was already as short as 1/2 for the St Leger.

==== Autumn ====
While Ormonde was galloping one morning shortly before the St Leger Stakes, Porter noticed him making a whistling noise. In spite of this infirmity, Ormonde started the final classic of the year as the 1/7 favourite. Ridden again by Archer, he pulled away half a mile out and won easily by 4 lengths from St. Mirin, without even being asked for an effort. The win made him the fourth winner of the English Triple Crown.

He next ran in the Great Foal Stakes at Newmarket, again winning easily by three lengths from Mephisto. He then won the Newmarket St Leger in a walkover and the Champion Stakes as the 1/100 favourite by a length from Oberon. Ormonde then entered a free handicap at Newmarket. Starting the 1/7 favourite and carrying 9 st 2 lb, he won by eight lengths from Mephisto, to whom he was conceding 28 lbs. At the same meeting he won a private sweepstakes in a walkover. The sweepstakes was an originally scheduled as a match race between Ormonde, The Bard, Melton and possibly Bendigo, the 1886 Eclipse winner. Bendigo was not nominated from the race in the end. The Bard and Melton were though and both forfeited £500 to Ormonde's connections. Throughout the end of the season, Ormonde's breathing had become progressively louder until he was labelled a roarer.<tbheritage />

=== 1887: Four-year-old season ===
Ormonde did not race until June 1887. His return was assisted by an experimental treatment involving "galvanic shocks" being applied daily to his chest and throat. His reappearance came at Royal Ascot in the Rous Memorial Stakes, where his opposition included Kilwarlin, who went on to win the season's St. Leger Stakes. Ormonde was conceding 25 pounds to Kilwarin and before the race Kilwarin's owner Captain Machell said to Porter, "The horse was never foaled that could give Kilwarin 25 pounds and beat him." After Fred Archer's suicide, Tom Cannon was now Ormonde's jockey. He led the race throughout and won easily by six lengths from Kilwarlin, with Agave a distant third. Upon seeing Captain Machell in the paddock after the race Porter said, "Well, what did you think of it now?" Machell replied, "Ormonde is not a horse at all; he's a damned steam-engine."

He raced again the next day in the Hardwicke Stakes, where he faced a strong field including Minting and Eclipse Stakes winner Bendigo. Minting's trainer Matt Dawson was confident that his horse could win this time due to Ormonde's breathing problems. As the four runners made their way to the starting post he remarked to Porter "You will be beaten today, John. No horse afflicted with Ormonde's infirmity can hope to beat Minting." Indeed, Porter himself admitted he was not overly confident of victory. During the race George Barrett, aboard Phil, impeded Ormonde and he was made to struggle for the first time in his career. During the closing stages, Ormonde and Minting battled with each other and Ormonde just came out on top, winning by a neck, with Bendigo in third.

In his final race, he won the 6 furlong Imperial Gold Cup at Newmarket. Starting at 30/100 he made all the running and won by two lengths from Whitefriar.

Ormonde was then retired as the most celebrated horse of his era. He was sent by train to Waterloo Station, then walked to Grosvenor House in Mayfair, where he was the guest of honor at a garden party to celebrate Queen Victoria's Golden Jubilee.

== Race record ==
Date	Race name	D(f)	Course	Prize (£)	Odds	Runners	Place	Margin	Runner-up	Time	Jockey
14 October 1885	Post Sweepstakes	6	Newmarket	500	5/4	3	1	1	Modwena		Fred Archer
26 October 1885	Criterion Stakes	6	Newmarket	906	4/6	6	1	3	Oberon		Fred Archer
28 October 1885	Dewhurst Stakes	7	Newmarket	1602	4/11	11	1	4	Whitefriar		Fred Archer
28 April 1886	2000 Guineas	8	Newmarket	4000	7/2	6	1	2	Minting	1:46.8	George Barrett
26 May 1886	Epsom Derby	12	Epsom Downs	4700	40/85	9	1	1.5	The Bard	2:45.6	Fred Archer
10 June 1886	St. James's Palace Stakes	8	Ascot	1500	3/100	3	1	0.75	Calais		Fred Archer
13 June 1886	Hardwicke Stakes	12	Ascot	2438	30/100	5	1	2	Melton	2:43	George Barrett
15 September 1886	St Leger Stakes	14.5	Doncaster	4475	1/7	7	1	4	St Mirin	3:21.4	Fred Archer
29 September 1886	Great Foal Stakes	10	Newmarket	1140	1/25	3	1	3	Mephisto		Fred Archer
1 October 1886	Newmarket St Leger	16	Newmarket	475	N/A	1	1	Walkover	Walkover		Fred Archer
15 October 1886	Champion Stakes	10	Newmarket	1212	1/100	3	1	1	Oberon	2:19	Fred Archer
28 October 1886	Free Handicap	10	Newmarket	650	1/7	3	1	8	Mephisto	2:22	Fred Archer
29 October 1886	Private Sweepstakes	10	Newmarket	1000	N/A	1	1	Walkover	Walkover		Fred Archer
9 June 1887	Rous Memorial Stakes	8	Ascot	920	1/4		1	6	Kilwarlin		Tom Cannon
12 June 1887	Hardwicke Stakes	12	Ascot	2387	4/5	4	1	0.25	Minting	2:44.4	Tom Cannon
16 July 1887	Imperial Gold Cup	6	Newmarket	590	30/100	3	1	2	Whitefriar	1:18	Tom Cannon

== Assessment ==
Ormonde is generally considered one of the greatest racehorses ever. At the time he was often labelled as the 'horse of the century'. His achievements are even more impressive considering the strength of some of the other horses foaled in 1883. It is said that both Minting and The Bard were good enough to have won The Derby nine out of ten years. In early 1888 Minting, the horse Ormonde beat easily in the 2000 Guineas, was rated 15 pounds superior to the 1887 Derby winner Merry Hampton and the 1887 St Leger winner Kilwarlin.

== Stud record ==
Ormonde went to the Duke of Westminster's Eaton Stud in 1888, where he sired seven foals from the sixteen mares he covered, including Goldfinch and Orme. In 1889, he was moved to Moulton Paddocks in Newmarket, but became sick and could only cover a few mares, with only one live foal produced in 1890. He was subsequently returned to Eaton Stud but his fertility never recovered. To the astonishment of many, Ormonde was then sold overseas. Both he and his dam were roarers, and the Duke felt this could weaken English bloodstock. Ormonde was sold to Senor Bocau of Argentina for £12,000, and then in 1893 to William O'Brien Macdonough, of California for £31,250. He stood at the Menlo Stock Farm in California for several years, where he sired 16 foals. including Futurity Stakes winner Ormondale.

=== English foals ===
c = colt, f = filly

Foaled	Name	Sex	Dam	Notable wins	Wins	Prize money
1889	Goldfinch	c	Thistle	Biennial Stakes, New Stakes	2	£2,464
1889	Kilkenny	f	Bryonia		1	£164
1889	Llanthony	c	Agnes Bentinck	Ascot Derby	4	£3,139
1889	Orme	c	Angelica	Middle Park Plate, Dewhurst Plate, Eclipse Stakes (twice), Sussex Stakes, Champion Stakes, Limekiln Stakes, Rous Memorial Stakes, Gordon Stakes	14	£32,528
1889	Orontes II	f	Ierne		0
1889	Orville	c	Shotover		0
1889	Sorcerer	c	Crucible		1	£229
1890	Glenwood	c	Maid of Dorset	Aylesford Foal Plate	2	£1,726

Despite only siring eight horses in England, Ormonde had a significant impact at stud. Orme was the leading sire in Great Britain and Ireland when he sired another Triple Crown winner, Flying Fox, who went on to be a leading sire in France. Orme also sired Epsom Derby winner Orby and 1000 Guineas winner Witch Elm. Goldfinch sired 1000 Guineas winner Chelandry. After being sold and moving to California, Goldfinch sired Preakness Stakes winner Old England. In America, his son Ormondale went on to sire Jockey Club Gold Cup winner Purchase.

Ormonde died in 1904 at age 21 at Rancho Wikiup in Santa Rosa, California. His disarticulated skeleton/skull were later returned to the Natural History Museum in South Kensington, London. His male line survives mainly through Teddy, grandson of Flying Fox. Orby does still have a sire line as well.

Ormonde may have been the model for the fictional horse Silver Blaze in Arthur Conan Doyle's Sherlock Holmes short story "The Adventure of Silver Blaze" (1892).

== Pedigree ==
Pedigree of Ormonde, bay stallion, 1883
Sire Bend Or (GB) ch. 1877	Doncaster (GB) ch. 1870	Stockwell ch. 1849	The Baron
Sire Bend Or (GB) ch. 1877	Doncaster (GB) ch. 1870	Stockwell ch. 1849	Pocahontas
Sire Bend Or (GB) ch. 1877	Doncaster (GB) ch. 1870	Marigold ch. 1860	Teddington
Sire Bend Or (GB) ch. 1877	Doncaster (GB) ch. 1870	Marigold ch. 1860	Ratan mare
Sire Bend Or (GB) ch. 1877	Rouge Rose (GB) ch. 1865	Thormanby ch. 1857	Windhound
Sire Bend Or (GB) ch. 1877	Rouge Rose (GB) ch. 1865	Thormanby ch. 1857	Alice Hawthorn
Sire Bend Or (GB) ch. 1877	Rouge Rose (GB) ch. 1865	Ellen Horne br. 1844	Redshank
Sire Bend Or (GB) ch. 1877	Rouge Rose (GB) ch. 1865	Ellen Horne br. 1844	Delhi
Dam Lily Agnes (GB) b. 1871	Macaroni (GB) b. 1860	Sweetmeat br. 1842	Gladiator
Dam Lily Agnes (GB) b. 1871	Macaroni (GB) b. 1860	Sweetmeat br. 1842	Lollypop
Dam Lily Agnes (GB) b. 1871	Macaroni (GB) b. 1860	Jocose b. 1843	Pantaloon
Dam Lily Agnes (GB) b. 1871	Macaroni (GB) b. 1860	Jocose b. 1843	Banter
Dam Lily Agnes (GB) b. 1871	Polly Agnes (GB) b./br. 1865	The Cure b. 1841	Physician
Dam Lily Agnes (GB) b. 1871	Polly Agnes (GB) b./br. 1865	The Cure b. 1841	Morsel
Dam Lily Agnes (GB) b. 1871	Polly Agnes (GB) b./br. 1865	Miss Agnes br. 1850	Birdcatcher
Dam Lily Agnes (GB) b. 1871	Polly Agnes (GB) b./br. 1865	Miss Agnes br. 1850	Agnes (Family: 16-h)

Note: b. = Bay, br. = Brown, ch. = Chestnut

== See also ==
- List of leading Thoroughbred racehorses
