= John Wells (jockey) =

British horse racing jockey

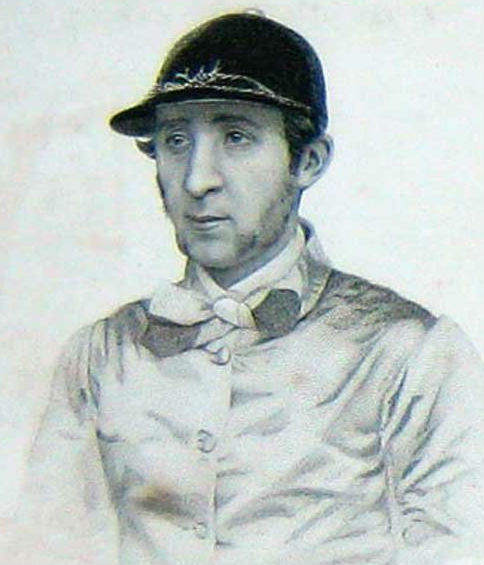
- Jockey John Wells from frontispiece of Baily's Magazine 1861

Personal information
- Born: 25 December 1833 Sutton Coldfield, Warwickshire
- Died: 1873 (aged 39–40)
- Occupation: Jockey

Horse racing career
- Sport: Horse racing

Major racing wins
- British Classic Race wins as jockey: 1,000 Guineas (2); 2,000 Guineas; Epsom Derby (3); St. Leger (2)

Racing awards
- British flat racing Champion Jockey twice (1853, 1854)

Significant horses
- Beadsman, Blue Gown, Musjid

John Wells (1833–1873), nicknamed Tiny Wells or Brusher Wells, was a Warwickshire-born British flat racing Champion Jockey of the Victorian era.

== Career ==
=== Apprentice ===
He was apprenticed to the stable of Mr Flintoff in Hednesford while in his teens. There, he earned the nickname 'Tiny' on account of his small stature, even though he eventually became one of the tallest jockeys in the weighing room. He was also known as 'Brusher', but it is not known where this nickname came from.

His first victory came in 1848 in the Birmingham Stakes at the now defunct Walsall Racecourse on a horse called Ribaldry.

=== Full professional ===
He became the retained jockey for Sir Joseph Hawley and was therefore most often found riding for that owner's trainer, George Manning, who was based at Cannons Heath, near Kingsclere, Berkshire. Early on in his professional career, he suffered a serious accident while riding the mare Freedom in the Earl Spencer's Plate at Northampton in April 1852. As two horses closed on her to overtake, she crossed her legs and fell, breaking her back and dying instantly. Wells himself was left with severe concussion.

Despite this setback, he topped the jockeys' championship in 1853 with 86 winners, a product of the Hawley – Manning partnership. He could still meet a weight of 6 stone at the time. The next few years were full of notable achievements. He won his first classic on Virago, often judged the finest filly of the 19th century. In 1857, he won 20 races in one year on the remarkable Fisherman, trained by Mr Parr. Then, in 1858 and 1859, he won back-to-back Derbies for Hawley, on Beadsman and Musjid. Of his winning ride on Musjid it was said, "Not one jockey out of 50 who cared a straw for his life would have dashed through the mob of horses that shut him in as he did."

Manning died in 1863, and John Porter took over at Cannons Heath. Although by this time Wells had long been eclipsed as leading jockey by George Fordham, he still found success with many of Beadsman's offspring. A particular favourite was Rosicrucian. Wells is said to have announced himself and the horse as, "John Wells on Rosicrucian, the handsomest man on the handsomest horse in England."

When it came to the 1868 Derby, Wells was left with the dilemma of choosing his mount from three of Beadsman's sons—the aforementioned Rosicrucian, Green Sleeve and Blue Gown. Green Sleeve and Rosicrucian had run first and second in the previous year's Middle Park Stakes and had beaten Blue Gown in trials, so Wells might have been expected to favour them. Moreover, Wells had history with Blue Gown. As favourite for the 1867 Champagne Stakes, the horse had won, but later been disqualified because of "trickery in the weighing room". This "trickery" was required because Wells had stayed up with friends socialising the night before the race and ruined his chance of making the designated race weight of 8 st 10 lbs. To avoid riding overweight, Wells had touched the floor with his toes while weighing out, then attempted to drop a small saddle cloth on the way back in, so he could again meet the weight on the way in. This deception was spotted by fellow jockey, John Doyle, and the horse subsequently disqualified. The disqualification cost Hawley £4,000, leaving him furious with Wells. The incident was more shocking as it was so uncharacteristically dishonest. His trainer, Porter had once remarked of his unimpeachable reputation, "there was not sufficient money in the Bank of England to bribe him to ride a crooked race."

Despite the incident, Wells chose to ride Blue Gown above the other two colts in the 1868 Derby. The decisive factor seems to have been that Wells knew Blue Gown had not suffered from the fever that had affected the yard during a move to new premises at Park House, as the other two had. In the end, it was the right choice. Blue Gown won and Hawley gave Wells the prize money of £6,800, even though he himself had backed Rosicrucian heavily on the back of private trials. It is also suggested that Hawley gave Wells the use of Hawley House, where the jockey lived towards the end of his life.

Wells last great race was his 1869 St. Leger win on Pero Gomez. By then, the effect of severe wasting was taking its toll on "the tallest and biggest man ever [to] ride 8st 7lb".

== Riding style ==
Of his riding style, 19th-century observer Henry Custance said, "He was a very strong man on a horse... always sat well back in his saddle, kept hold of the horse's head and was a very resolute finisher." Despite this, he was not known as a stylish jockey. He did, however, maintain a unique style off the track, known for wearing tartan suits, red slippers and feathered hats. When mocked for this, he was reported to have replied with characteristic vanity, "My tailor makes my clothes for nothing. It is not often he comes across a figure like mine to fit them on." In turn, Hawley commented, "I don't care how he dresses; he is a good enough jockey for me."

== Death ==
Wells married Mary, the daughter of trainer Thomas Taylor. He died, aged 39 from dieting related health issues and is buried along with his wife at St Mary's, Kingsclere. He had been careful with his race winnings, investing in a steel pen factory, an investment that provided for his family after death.

== Major wins ==
(United Kingdom) Great Britain

=== Classic races ===
- 1,000 Guineas – (2) – Virago (1854), Tomato (1864)
- 2,000 Guineas – Fitz-Roland (1858)
- Derby – (3) – Beadsman (1858), Musjid (1859), Blue Gown (1868)
- St. Leger – (2) – Saucebox (1855), Pero Gomez (1869)

== Bibliography ==
- Tanner, Michael; Cranham, Gerry (1992). Great Jockeys of the Flat. Enfield, Middlesex: Guinness Publishing. ISBN 0-85112-989-7.
- Wright, Howard (1986). The Encyclopaedia of Flat Racing. London: Robert Hale. ISBN 0-7090-2639-0.
