= Nat Flatman =

English flat racing jockey (1810–1860)

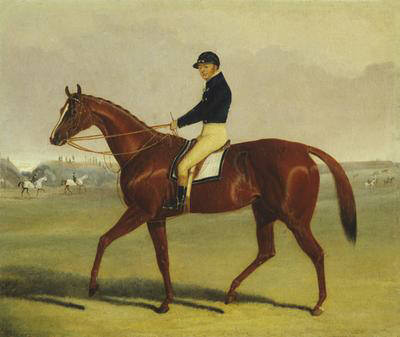
- Nat Flatman aboard Preserve at Newmarket Racecourse; 1835 painting by John Frederick Herring, Jr.

Personal information
- Born: 1810 Great Britain
- Died: 20 August 1860 (aged 49–50)
- Occupation: Jockey

Horse racing career
- Sport: Horse racing
- Career wins: Not found

Major racing wins
- Goodwood Cup (1834, 1837, 1852); Molecomb Stakes (1835, 1847, 1851, 1854, 1858); St. James's Palace Stakes (1835, 1845, 1846, 1848); Stewards' Cup (1841, 1846); Nassau Stakes (1842, 1843, 1847, 1849, 1852, 1859); July Stakes (1843); Coronation Stakes (1844, 1845, 1848, 1849, 1851); Ascot Gold Cup (1846); Doncaster Gold Cup (1850) British Classic Race wins: 1,000 Guineas (1835, 1847, 1857); Epsom Derby (1844); 2,000 Guineas (1845, 1851, 1856); St. Leger Stakes (1848, 1856, 1857) International race wins: Prix du Cadran (1843, 1845); Prix du Jockey Club (1837, 1846, 1856); Prix de Diane (1850, 1852); Grand Critérium (1855, 1856)

Racing awards
- British flat racing Champion Jockey (1840-1852)

Honours
- Nat Flatman Street, Newmarket, Suffolk, England

Significant horses
- Voltigeur, Preserve, Orlando, Alarm, Surplice
- Updated on 28 April 2013

Elnathan "Nat" Flatman (1810 – 20 August 1860), born Holton St. Mary, Suffolk, was the first Champion flat racing jockey of Great Britain. He began his thirty-four-year racing career as an apprentice jockey at age fifteen and by 1840 he was the dominant rider in British racing, winning the Champion Jockey title thirteen years in a row. During his career, Flatman won the patronage of many significant owners, including Lord George Bentinck, the Earl of Chesterfield, Admiral Rous, Lord Stradbroke and Lord Derby. For these owners, and others like them he won most of the important Thoroughbred horse races in England, including ten Classics, and some significant races in France. He continued to ride until the paddock accident that incapacitated him and ultimately led to his death at the age of 50.

== Early life ==
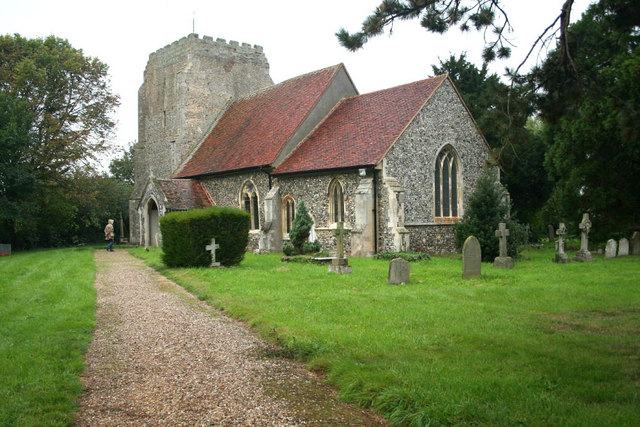
St. Mary's Church, Holton St. Mary, the village where Flatman was born

Flatman was born in Holton St. Mary, Suffolk in 1810 to a father who was a smallholder. In his youth, the family moved 10 miles north to the village of Bildeston, where they got to know a local horse breeder by the name of Wilson. Wilson had been responsible for breeding the renowned horse, Smolensko, winner of the 1813 2,000 Guineas and Derby and the young Flatman began to spend a lot of time there, formulating ideas of becoming a jockey. He attended a local clergyman's school as a child, but when his father ran into financial hardship in 1825 and he had to quit, he was prompted to move to the home of horseracing in Newmarket.

== Career ==
=== Apprenticeship ===
With all his belongings wrapped in a handkerchief and slung over his shoulder Flatman hiked from his home to Newmarket – a scruffy 15-year-old, 4 stone (25 kg) stripling looking for work. When he arrived at the yard of trainer, William Cooper, "one of the most upright trainers and best men that ever lived", he was initially dismissed on account of his dishevelled appearance. Cooper's wife took kindly to him, though, and pleaded Flatman's cause to her husband. As a result, Flatman was taken on as apprentice to the Cooper stable in 1825.

Flatman worked with Cooper for three years before he was offered his first opportunity to race in public. At this time he could ride at just a little over 6 stone (38 kg). This debut was a high-profile one, riding Lord Exeter's Golden (or Gold) Pin in the 1829 Craven Stakes, the first important race of the season at Newmarket. Among his opponents were Zinganee, ridden by Sam Chifney, Jr., and the King's favourite, Fleur-de-lis. In the race, Golden Pin finished unplaced behind Zinganee, but of greater long term consequence was the arrival of the young Flatman on the Newmarket scene. It wasn't until the following season that he had his first win, but after that "the boy's rise in his profession was rapid and unintermitted."

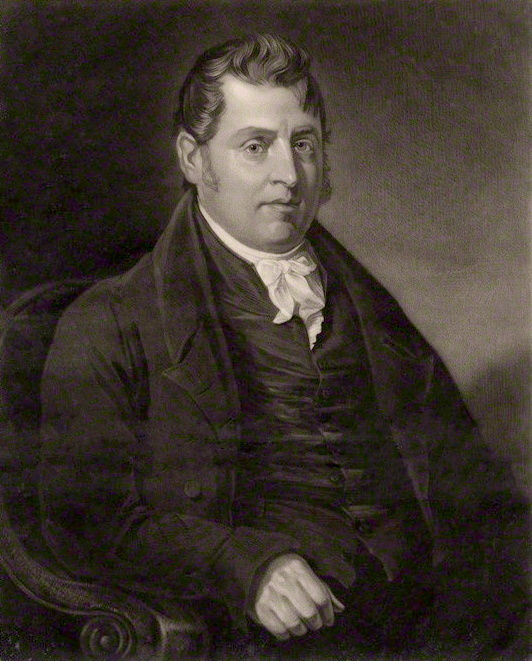
Colonel Jonathan Peel, for whom Flatman rode in his early years

=== 1830s ===
Cooper had several prominent owners at his yard, including Colonel Peel, the Earl of Strafford, General Yates, Captain Gardnor and, in later years, Mr. Payne, Mr. Greville, Lord Chesterfield and Lord Glasgow, so Flatman was well placed to ride winners. Yet, despite the profile and wealth of some of these patrons, Flatman never took a retainer from Cooper during his time at the yard and took no more than 20 per annum from Colonel Peel. He was, however, a remarkably loyal jockey. It was said that "never was there a more faithful or honest servant than Flatman proved himself to all his employers."

Soon, Flatman was taking up more rides than any other jockey, on account of his being able to ride at 7 stone 5 lbs (46.7 kg) and his profile began to rise. In 1832, he had his first classic rides for Cooper. He is reported as having ridden The General in that year's renewal of the Derby, although the Racing Calendar of 1832 shows no record of a horse with that name running in the race. He also rode Gretna Green in the Oaks but finished unplaced.

His first big race win came not for Cooper, but for James "Tiny" Edwards on the 1834 Goodwood Cup winner Glencoe I. The following year, his career took another step forward when he won the first of what would become ten Classics, the 1,000 Guineas, on the Charles Greville-owned Preserve. However, it was actually a losing ride on Ascot in the 1835 Derby, going down to Mundig by only a short neck, that "lifted Flatman into the first rank of jockeys". He would later recompense for this narrow miss by taking the St. James's Palace Stakes at Royal Ascot on the same horse. Big race victories would continue into late summer when he took Goodwood's Molecomb Stakes on Elis.

In the summer of 1837 he was now "at the height of his profession". He took the Goodwood Cup for a second time, as well as a first Doncaster Cup. He also formed a winning partnership with Mango, only to lose the ride, for unrecorded reasons, to Sam Day. Day rode the horse to victory in the St Leger, a race that would elude Flatman himself until the late 1840s.

Flatman had by now started to ride for George Payne, who became his regular master and for whom he would ride for the rest of his life.

=== 1840s ===
By the 1840s, Flatman was firmly established as the top rider of his generation. Prominent jockeys of earlier times such as Arthur Pavis, Patrick Conolly and John Chapple were no longer around to compete, the former two having met with early deaths.

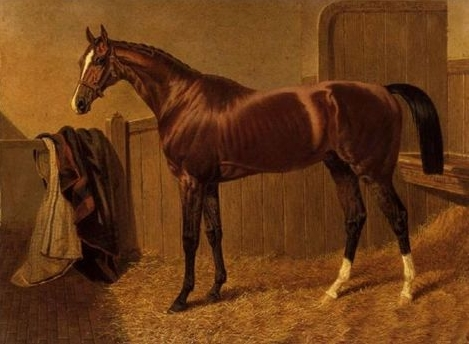
Orlando on whom Flatman won the controversial 1844 Derby

His profile was such that he began to be in demand at northern racecourses like Manchester and Newcastle, riding for Malton-based trainer John Scott. In a manner more akin to his modern day counterparts than some of his contemporaries, he would regularly travel up and down the country to take rides. On one occasion in 1840 he won the Chester Cup one day and rode at Newmarket next, a remarkable logistical achievement given the transportation of the time. This strategy bore fruit in the number of winners he was riding. In 1840, he rode 50 winners; in the period 1846-1848 he was creating new records year-on-year, peaking at 104 wins in 1848, the sport's first century of winners.

He missed a possible winning chance in the 1841 Derby when he was knocked off Alarm amongst a scuffle at the starting post. Then, in 1844, he was involved in one of the most controversial races in turf history. In the Derby of that year, he was beaten by Running Rein, on his mount Orlando. Subsequently, Running Rein was found to be a ringer and Orlando was awarded the race by stewards. By the end of the decade, he had also added a second 1,000 Guineas (Clementina in 1847), 2,000 Guineas (Idas in 1845) and a St. Leger (Surplice in 1848).

The first seasonal record of jockeys' winners was published in 1846 and from that first publication until 1852, Flatman was always at the top of the list. Records for the years before that show he also accumulated the most wins in the period from 1840 to 1845, equating to 13 jockeys' championships.

=== 1850s ===
The closing years of Flatman's career were not so successful. By the early 1850s, John 'Tiny' Wells, George Fordham, John Charlton, Henry Custance and brothers James and Luke Snowden were coming to the fore, all able to ride at 7 stone 7 lbs (47.6 kg). During his prime, Flatman had ridden at 7 stone 8 lbs (48.1 kg) but he could no longer compete at this weight. John Wells was the first to overhaul Flatman in the jockeys championship in 1853. By 1854, both Wells and Charlton had headed him, and from then on Flatman gradually fell out of favour until in his final year of riding in 1859, he won only fifteen races.

However, he did take part in one of the most famous races of the century, the so-called Great Match between Voltigeur and The Flying Dutchman at York in May 1851. Flatman rode Voltigeur, who had won the Derby, St. Leger and Doncaster Cup the previous year. In the latter race, he had inflicted The Flying Dutchman's only defeat. At York, unlike at Doncaster, he made the running, and held the lead into the straight, but in the final furlong dropped his whip, and The Flying Dutchman pulled ahead to win by a length.

Among his last brilliant victories were the 2,000 Guineas and the Great Yorkshire in 1856 on Fazzoletto, and the 1,000 Guineas on Imperieuse in 1857. In 1858 he came under criticism for the ride he gave Lord Derby's Toxopheolite in the Derby, but when Sam Rogers rode the same horse to defeat in the St. Leger his reputation was restored. Flatman rode Target for Lord Derby in the Oaks of that year, the last Epsom Classic he rode.

Flatman had his portrait painted by equine artist Harry Hall (1814–1882) and by John Frederick Herring, Sr. (1795–1865) and his son, John Herring, Jr. (1820–1907).

== Death ==
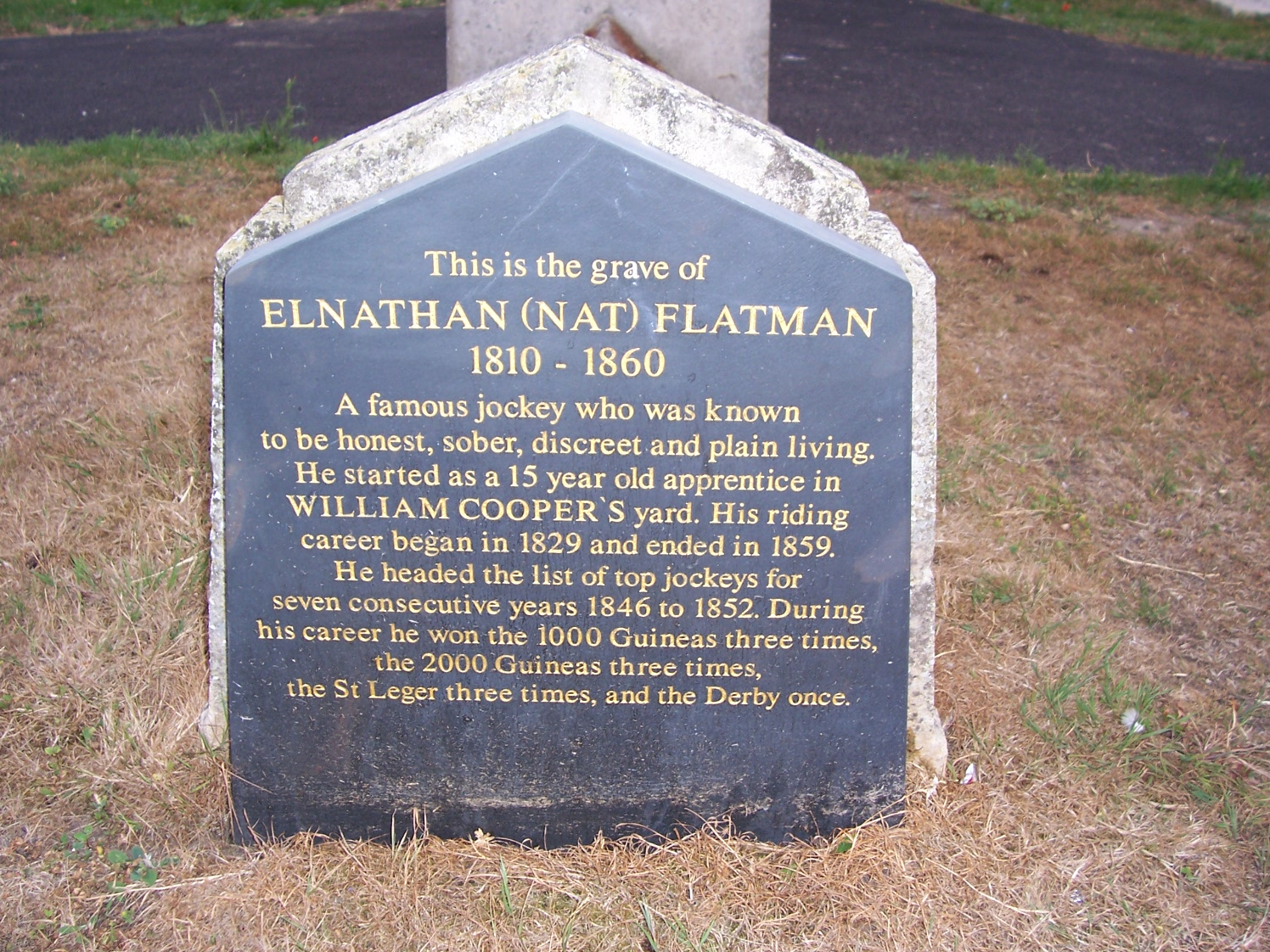
Nat Flatman is buried in All Saints churchyard, Newmarket

The last win of Flatman's career came on the Tuesday of the first October meeting of 1859. He won a match on Golden Rule for Admiral Rous. The following Thursday, he was riding again for Rous on a horse called Golden Pippin. The filly started at odds of 6/4 but was unruly and ended up beaten three-quarters of a length. It was to be the last ride of his career. On the way back to the weighing room, the mare kicked Flatman, breaking a rib. The story, however, appears differently from different sources. Some have the horse owned by the Duke of Bedford, not Rous. Some have Flatman falling from the horse rather than being kicked by it. It has even been said that it was a different horse entirely, Lord Aylesbury's Sudbury, which he had ridden in the Biennial Stakes. What is clear, is that for a while, Flatman was expected to fully recover. In reality, the rib had been driven into his lung, which became infected, and consumption followed. He began to relapse while out riding in his carriage and, after a lingering illness, died on Monday 20 August 1860. It had only been the second riding accident he had had in his long career. The first was a broken collar bone. By strange coincidence, the first race he had ever ridden was on Golden Pin, the last on Golden Pippin.

Flatman left £8,000 on his death. The epitaph on his headstone in All Saints Church, in Newmarket states that he was "known to be honest, sober, discreet and plain living." The town later named a street in Nat Flatman's honour. He had won 13 championships and 10 classics, every classic but the Oaks.

He was survived by a widow, three daughters and two sons, neither of which followed their father into the profession. One became a brewer, the other an architect and one of them (although it is not specified which) was an artist of renown. His daughters on the other hand all died young – one through an accident, the other two in the wreck of the Princess Alice when it collided with another boat on the River Thames in September 1878. His wife died in 1899. His brother Edward Flatman (c1807-1884) settled at Chantilly in France and rode four winners of the Prix du Jockey Club.

== Critical opinion ==
Flatman was known as an inelegant rider who lacked the "horsemanship and flashes of genius" of his contemporary Frank Butler. Instead, his success was attributed to his dependability or, put another way, to "a steady course of good riding and good conduct, extending over many years, rather than to any more characteristic qualities of jockeyship." He was not a whip jockey.

He "earned a reputation for honesty and talent combined, excelled by none of his compeers." Elsewhere, it is said that he rode scrupulously to orders and could not be induced to bet. Some other accounts dispute this, saying he occasionally bet like all jockeys, but was careful and shrewd. It is said that even though he rode many trials of horses, he would never afterwards reveal how they had performed. He was, in fact, "One of the most honourable and meritorious men of his class [that has been] ever encountered," "one of the most respectable and honourable knights of the pig-skin that ever performed upon an English race-course" and "a pleasant, cheerful fellow, a thoroughly good sportsman, and charitable withal."

=== Greatest rides ===
The dead heat between his horse Gibraltar and Crucifix in the 1839 Criterion Stakes has been described as "the race ... whereby his fame was established". However, his Doncaster Cup defeat of The Flying Dutchman on Voltigeur is often called his greatest triumph. It was the only time Flying Dutchman was beaten. Other races that have been put forward as highlights of his career are the 1834 Goodwood Cup on Glencoe and the 1846 Ascot Gold Cup on Alarm Flatman himself regarded Alarm as the best horse he rode.

== Career stats ==
Number of wins by season:

- pre-1839 – not known
- 1840 – 50
- 1841 – 68
- 1842 – 42
- 1843 – 60
- 1844 – 64
- 1845 – 81
- 1846 – 81
- 1847 – 89
- 1848 – 104
- 1849 – 94
- 1850 – 88
- 1851 – 78
- 1852 – 92
- 1853 – 78
- 1854 – 75
- 1855 – 43
- 1856 – 41
- 1857 – 46
- 1858 – 37
- 1859 – 15

== Classic race victories ==
(United Kingdom) Great Britain

- 1,000 Guineas – Preserve (1835), Clementina (1847), Imperieuse (1857)
- 2,000 Guineas – Idas (1845), Hernandez (1851), Fazzoletto (1856)
- Epsom Derby – Orlando (1844)
- St. Leger – Surplice (1848), Warlock (1856), Imperieuse (1857)

== Bibliography ==
- Foulkes, Nicholas (2011). Gentlemen & Blackguards: Gambling Mania and the Plot to Steal the Derby of 1844. Phoenix. ISBN 978-0753824757.
- Kent, John (1892). Lawley, Hon. Francis Charles (ed.). Racing life of Lord George Cavendish Bentinck, M. P. and other reminiscences. Edinburgh: Blackwood.
- Mortimer, Roger; Onslow, Richard; Willett, Peter (1978). Biographical Encyclopaedia of British Racing. London: Macdonald and Jane's. ISBN 0-354-08536-0.
- Silzter, Frank (1923). Newmarket: its sports and personalities. p. 80.
- Tanner, Michael; Cranham, Gerry (1992). Great Jockeys of the Flat – A celebration of two centuries of jockeyship. Guinness. ISBN 978-0-85112-989-1.
