= British Flat Jockeys Championship 2017 =

The 2017 British Flat Jockeys Championship was the competition to find the British flat racing Champion Jockey, the jockey with the most wins in Great Britain during the peak period of the British flat racing season from the start of the Guineas Meeting on Saturday 6 May to British Champions Day on Saturday 21 October 2017. It was won by Silvestre de Sousa for the second time. He finished with 155 winners in the qualifying period, ahead of the reigning champion, Jim Crowley. De Sousa had in fact passed 200 winners for the year at Lingfield on 18 October, and had effectively won the title many weeks before.

De Sousa was presented with award in a ceremony at Ascot. He said of the victory, "It's great to be here after a long season. I've worked really hard this year and I always wanted to win the title again and I finally did. For the last few weeks I've been very confident that no one could catch me. Whoever was in second and third, they were going to need to work twice as hard to catch me."

The Championship was sponsored by Stobart.

== Final table ==
Rank	Jockey	Wins	Rides	Strike rate	Total prize money (£)
1	Silvestre De Sousa	155	854	18%	1,786,226
2	Jim Crowley	111	636	17%	4,652,559
3	Ryan Moore	105	452	23%	7,466,059
4	Daniel Tudhope	93	517	18%	1,337,497
5	James Doyle	89	416	21%	3,031,776
6	Luke Morris	82	717	11%	1,071,084
7	P. J. McDonald	80	550	15%	1,438,987
8	Joe Fanning	78	510	15%	954,582
9	Oisin Murphy	76	578	13%	2,079,196
10	Andrea Atzeni	75	412	18%	2,786,970
11	Paul Mulrennan	70	538	13%	652,115
12	Jamie Spencer	67	417	16%	1,036,101
13	Graham Lee	66	543	12%	621,988
14	William Buick	64	285	22%	2,723,475
15	David Probert	62	507	12%	756,001
16	Adam Kirby	61	424	14%	1,486,389
17	Paul Hanagan	58	520	11%	1,138,360
18	Harry Bentley	57	373	15%	978,820
19	Franny Norton	57	455	13%	814,939
20	Pat Cosgrave	56	373	15%	737,832
21	Dane O'Neill	53	341	16%	578,290
22	Richard Kingscote	53	429	12%	799,198
23	David Egan	53	448	12%	572,817
24	Josephine Gordon	53	480	11%	866,361
25	Kieran Shoemark	52	393	13%	592,073
26	Ben Curtis	51	420	12%	398,595
27	Tom Marquand	49	470	10%	587,040
28	Tony Hamilton	49	479	10%	511,429
29	David Allan	48	395	12%	756,027
30	Kevin Stott	47	302	16%	483,091
31	Sean Levey	47	381	12%	956,277
32	Phillip Makin	43	354	12%	414,761
33	Shane Kelly	42	427	10%	365,911
34	Fran Berry	42	487	9%	638,293
35	Tom Eaves	42	507	8%	548,227
36	George Wood	41	294	14%	530,582
37	James Sullivan	41	459	9%	619,409
38	Andrew Mullen	41	468	9%	372,481
39	Frankie Dettori	40	185	22%	4,441,849
40	Charles Bishop	40	281	14%	453,691
41	J F Egan	40	348	11%	414,400
42	Martin Harley	40	367	11%	650,016
43	Jason Hart	40	367	11%	319,527
44	Robert Winston	38	330	12%	746,330
45	Connor Beasley	35	386	9%	326,256
46	Hollie Doyle	31	269	12%	349,875
47	Martin Dwyer	31	336	9%	398,424
48	Liam Keniry	30	379	8%	202,049
49	Lewis Edmunds	29	244	12%	242,248
50	Dougie Costello	28	347	8%	248,188
51	Callum Rodriguez	27	191	14%	343,223
52	Edward Greatrex	27	203	13%	240,520
53	Martin Lane	27	207	13%	254,816
54	Jack Garritty	26	291	9%	207,887
55	Pat Dobbs	25	297	8%	403,367
56	Adam McNamara	24	224	11%	242,890
57	Hector Crouch	24	252	10%	161,655
58	Adam Beschizza	24	260	9%	164,451
59	Clifford Lee	23	187	12%	257,480
60	Rowan Scott	23	231	10%	183,428
61	Charlie Bennett	23	249	9%	163,315
62	Daniel Muscutt	23	252	9%	282,405
63	Joshua Bryan	22	174	13%	136,448
64	Joe Doyle	22	246	9%	202,432
65	Tom Queally	22	300	7%	737,251
66	Callum Shepherd	21	228	9%	150,277
67	Jack Mitchell	20	183	11%	208,606
68	Stevie Donohoe	20	335	6%	332,615
69	Phil Dennis	19	173	11%	113,774
70	Ben Robinson	19	185	10%	113,502
71	Nathan Evans	19	212	9%	165,734
72	Steve Drowne	19	217	9%	150,785
73	Jane Elliott	18	185	10%	106,562
74	Mitch Godwin	18	228	8%	119,263
75	David Nolan	18	242	7%	179,218
76	Georgia Cox	17	109	16%	160,412
77	Connor Murtagh	17	209	8%	203,011
78	Kieran O'Neill	17	282	6%	193,088
79	Manuel Fernandes	16	81	20%	79,838
80	Robert Tart	16	116	14%	315,032
81	Jamie Gormley	16	152	11%	191,153
82	Finley Marsh	16	159	10%	119,292
83	Timmy Murphy	16	197	8%	91,147
84	Fergus Sweeney	16	221	7%	160,884
85	Rob Hornby	16	262	6%	164,490
86	Sam James	15	174	9%	133,556
87	Barry McHugh	15	220	7%	392,891
88	Joey Haynes	15	223	7%	196,250
89	Sammy Jo Bell	14	149	9%	134,820
90	William Carson	14	210	7%	124,073
91	Rachel Richardson	14	230	6%	231,247
92	William Cox	13	111	12%	79,663
93	Sam Hitchcott	13	154	8%	121,734
94	Royston Ffrench	13	216	6%	132,325
95	Gerald Mosse	12	79	15%	243,332
96	Jimmy Quinn	12	190	6%	213,017
97	Cam Hardie	12	323	4%	147,359
98	Paddy Pilley	11	130	8%	87,064
99	Kieren Fox	11	136	8%	89,395
100	Shane Gray	11	204	5%	95,703
