= British flat racing Champion Jockey =

British flat racing jockeys' championship

The champion jockey of flat racing in Great Britain is the rider who has the most wins during a season. For most of its existence, the jockeys championship was decided on the number of winners ridden between Lincoln Handicap Day and November Handicap Day, the traditional flat turf season. In 2015, it was announced that the title would be decided over a reduced timescale – the start of the Guineas Meeting and British Champions Day, roughly 24 instead of 32 weeks.

A prize of £25,000 to the champion jockey and £10,000 to the runner up was also introduced as part of the 2015 changes.

The championship was sponsored for the first time in 2009 by online casino 32Red and is currently sponsored by Stobart Group.

== Champions ==
The list below shows the champion jockey and the number of winners for each year since 1840. The seasonal record of jockeys' winners was published for the first time in 1846.

Jockeys are of British nationality unless stated

- 1840 - Nat Flatman - 50
- 1841 - Nat Flatman - 68
- 1842 - Nat Flatman - 42
- 1843 - Nat Flatman - 60
- 1844 - Nat Flatman - 64
- 1845 - Nat Flatman - 81
- 1846 - Nat Flatman - 81
- 1847 - Nat Flatman - 89
- 1848 - Nat Flatman - 104
- 1849 - Nat Flatman - 94
- 1850 - Nat Flatman - 88
- 1851 - Nat Flatman - 78
- 1852 - Nat Flatman - 92
- 1853 - John Wells - 86
- 1854 - John Wells - 82
- 1855 - George Fordham - 70
- 1856 - George Fordham - 108
- 1857 - George Fordham - 84
- 1858 - George Fordham - 91
- 1859 - George Fordham - 118
- 1860 - George Fordham - 146
- 1861 - George Fordham - 106
- 1862 - George Fordham - 166
- 1863 - George Fordham - 103
- 1864 - Jemmy Grimshaw - 164
- 1865 - George Fordham - 142
- 1866 - Sam Kenyon - 123
- 1867 - George Fordham - 143
- 1868 - George Fordham - 110
- 1869 - George Fordham - 95
- 1870 - William Gray / Charlie Maidment - 76
- 1871 - George Fordham / Charlie Maidment - 86
- 1872 - Tom Cannon, Sr. - 87
- 1873 - Harry Constable - 110
- 1874 - Fred Archer - 147
- 1875 - Fred Archer - 172
- 1876 - Fred Archer - 207
- 1877 - Fred Archer - 218
- 1878 - Fred Archer - 229
- 1879 - Fred Archer - 197
- 1880 - Fred Archer - 120
- 1881 - Fred Archer - 220
- 1882 - Fred Archer - 210
- 1883 - Fred Archer - 232
- 1884 - Fred Archer - 241
- 1885 - Fred Archer - 246
- 1886 - Fred Archer - 170
- 1887 - Charles Wood - 151
- 1888 - Fred Barrett - 108
- 1889 - Tommy Loates - 167
- 1890 - Tommy Loates - 147
- 1891 - Morny Cannon - 137
- 1892 - Morny Cannon - 182
- 1893 - Tommy Loates - 222
- 1894 - Morny Cannon - 167
- 1895 - Morny Cannon - 184
- 1896 - Morny Cannon - 164
- 1897 - Morny Cannon - 145
- 1898 - Otto Madden - 161
- 1899 - Sam Loates - 160
- 1900 - (United States) Lester Reiff - 143
- 1901 - Otto Madden - 130
- 1902 - Willie Lane - 170
- 1903 - Otto Madden - 154
- 1904 - Otto Madden - 161
- 1905 - Elijah Wheatley - 124
- 1906 - William Higgs - 149
- 1907 - William Higgs - 146
- 1908 - (United States) Danny Maher - 139
- 1909 - (Australia) Frank Wootton - 165
- 1910 - (Australia) Frank Wootton - 137
- 1911 - (Australia) Frank Wootton - 187
- 1912 - (Australia) Frank Wootton - 118
- 1913 - (United States) Danny Maher - 115
- 1914 - Steve Donoghue - 129
- 1915 - Steve Donoghue - 62
- 1916 - Steve Donoghue - 43
- 1917 - Steve Donoghue - 42
- 1918 - Steve Donoghue - 66
- 1919 - Steve Donoghue - 129
- 1920 - Steve Donoghue - 143
- 1921 - Steve Donoghue - 141
- 1922 - Steve Donoghue - 102
- 1923 - Steve Donoghue / Charlie Elliott - 89
- 1924 - Charlie Elliott - 106
- 1925 - Gordon Richards - 118
- 1926 - Tommy Weston - 95
- 1927 - Gordon Richards - 164
- 1928 - Gordon Richards - 148
- 1929 - Gordon Richards - 135
- 1930 - Freddie Fox - 129
- 1931 - Gordon Richards - 145
- 1932 - Gordon Richards - 190
- 1933 - Gordon Richards - 259
- 1934 - Gordon Richards - 212
- 1935 - Gordon Richards - 217
- 1936 - Gordon Richards - 174
- 1937 - Gordon Richards - 216
- 1938 - Gordon Richards - 206
- 1939 - Gordon Richards - 155
- 1940 - Gordon Richards - 68
- 1941 - Harry Wragg - 71
- 1942 - Gordon Richards - 67
- 1943 - Gordon Richards - 65
- 1944 - Gordon Richards - 88
- 1945 - Gordon Richards - 104
- 1946 - Gordon Richards - 212
- 1947 - Gordon Richards - 269
- 1948 - Gordon Richards - 224
- 1949 - Gordon Richards - 261
- 1950 - Gordon Richards - 201
- 1951 - Gordon Richards - 227
- 1952 - Gordon Richards - 231
- 1953 - Gordon Richards - 191
- 1954 - Doug Smith - 129
- 1955 - Doug Smith - 168
- 1956 - Doug Smith - 155
- 1957 - (Australia) Scobie Breasley - 173
- 1958 - Doug Smith - 165
- 1959 - Doug Smith - 157
- 1960 - Lester Piggott - 170
- 1961 - (Australia) Scobie Breasley - 171
- 1962 - (Australia) Scobie Breasley - 179
- 1963 - (Australia) Scobie Breasley - 176
- 1964 - Lester Piggott - 140
- 1965 - Lester Piggott - 160
- 1966 - Lester Piggott - 191
- 1967 - Lester Piggott - 117
- 1968 - Lester Piggott - 139
- 1969 - Lester Piggott - 163
- 1970 - Lester Piggott - 162
- 1971 - Lester Piggott - 162
- 1972 - Willie Carson - 132
- 1973 - Willie Carson - 164
- 1974 - (Republic of Ireland) Pat Eddery - 148
- 1975 - (Republic of Ireland) Pat Eddery - 164
- 1976 - (Republic of Ireland) Pat Eddery - 162
- 1977 - (Republic of Ireland) Pat Eddery - 176
- 1978 - Willie Carson - 182
- 1979 - Joe Mercer - 164
- 1980 - Willie Carson - 166
- 1981 - Lester Piggott - 179
- 1982 - Lester Piggott - 188
- 1983 - Willie Carson - 159
- 1984 - (United States) Steve Cauthen - 130
- 1985 - (United States) Steve Cauthen - 195
- 1986 - (Republic of Ireland) Pat Eddery - 176
- 1987 - (United States) Steve Cauthen - 197
- 1988 - (Republic of Ireland) Pat Eddery - 183
- 1989 - (Republic of Ireland) Pat Eddery - 171
- 1990 - (Republic of Ireland) Pat Eddery - 209
- 1991 - (Republic of Ireland) Pat Eddery - 165
- 1992 - (South Africa) Michael Roberts - 206
- 1993 - (Republic of Ireland) Pat Eddery - 169
- 1994 - (Italy) Frankie Dettori - 233
- 1995 - (Italy) Frankie Dettori - 211
- 1996 - (Republic of Ireland) Pat Eddery - 186
- 1997 - (Republic of Ireland) Kieren Fallon - 202
- 1998 - (Republic of Ireland) Kieren Fallon - 204
- 1999 - (Republic of Ireland) Kieren Fallon - 200
- 2000 - Kevin Darley - 155
- 2001 - (Republic of Ireland) Kieren Fallon - 166
- 2002 - (Republic of Ireland) Kieren Fallon - 136
- 2003 - (Republic of Ireland) Kieren Fallon - 207
- 2004 - (Italy) Frankie Dettori - 192
- 2005 - (Republic of Ireland) Jamie Spencer - 163
- 2006 - Ryan Moore - 180
- 2007 - Seb Sanders / (Republic of Ireland) Jamie Spencer - 190
- 2008 - Ryan Moore - 186
- 2009 - Ryan Moore - 174
- 2010 - Paul Hanagan - 191
- 2011 - Paul Hanagan - 165
- 2012 - (Republic of Ireland) Richard Hughes - 172
- 2013 - (Republic of Ireland) Richard Hughes - 208
- 2014 - (Republic of Ireland) Richard Hughes - 161
- 2015 - (Brazil) Silvestre de Sousa - 132
- 2016 - Jim Crowley - 148
- 2017 - (Brazil) Silvestre de Sousa -155
- 2018 - (Brazil) Silvestre de Sousa - 148
- 2019 - (Republic of Ireland) Oisin Murphy - 168
- 2020 - (Republic of Ireland) Oisin Murphy - 142
- 2021 - (Republic of Ireland) Oisin Murphy - 153
- 2022 - William Buick - 157
- 2023 - William Buick - 135
- 2024 - (Republic of Ireland) Oisin Murphy - 163
- 2025 - (Republic of Ireland) Oisin Murphy - 143
- 2026 - (Republic of Ireland) Billy Loughnane

== Records ==
- Most titles - 26, Gordon Richards
- Most consecutive titles - 13, Nat Flatman (1840-1852), Fred Archer (1874-1886)
- Most wins in a season - 269, Gordon Richards (1947)

== See also ==
- British flat racing Champion Apprentice
- British flat racing Champion Trainer
- British flat racing Champion Owner
- British jump racing Champion Jockey
- Leading sire in Great Britain & Ireland

== Bibliography ==
- Mortimer, Roger; Onslow, Richard; Willett, Peter (1978). Biographical Encyclopaedia of British Racing. London: Macdonald and Jane's. ISBN 0-354-08536-0.
- Wright, Howard (1986). The Encyclopaedia of Flat Racing. London: Robert Hale. ISBN 0-7090-2639-0.
