= Listed buildings in Holton St Mary =

Civil Parish in Suffolk, England

Holton St Mary is a village and civil parish in the Babergh District of Suffolk, England. It contains 14 listed buildings that are recorded in the National Heritage List for England. Of these one is grade II* and 13 are grade II.

This list is based on the information retrieved online from Historic England.

== Key ==
Grade	Criteria
I	Buildings that are of exceptional interest
II*	Particularly important buildings of more than special interest
II	Buildings that are of special interest

== Listing ==
Name	Grade	Location	Type	Completed (Note: The date given is the date used by Historic England as significant for the initial building or that of an important part in the structure's description.)	Date designated	Grid ref. (Note: The grid reference is based on the British national grid reference system, sometimes known as OSGB36, used by the Ordnance Survey.) Geo-coordinates	Notes	Entry number (Note: The "List Entry Number" is a unique number assigned to each listed building and scheduled monument by Historic England.)	Image	Wikidata
Holton Place	II	Bacons Green, Holton St. Mary			5 June 1987	TM0527237167; 51°59′42″N 0°59′19″E		1036982	Upload Photo	Q26288659
Mayfields	II	B 1070, Holton St. Mary			5 June 1987	TM0556837320; 51°59′47″N 0°59′35″E		1036981	Upload Photo	Q26288658
Barn Approximately 20 Metres North West of Four Sisters Farmhouse	II	B1070, Holton St. Mary			5 June 1987	TM0659436490; 51°59′18″N 1°00′27″E		1198496	Upload Photo	Q26494525
Church of St Mary	II*	B1070, Holton St. Mary	church building		22 February 1955	TM0592736787; 51°59′29″N 0°59′52″E		1351596	Church of St Mary More images	Q17534506
Four Sisters Farmhouse	II	B1070, Holton St. Mary			5 June 1987	TM0661736474; 51°59′18″N 1°00′28″E		1351597	Upload Photo	Q26634684
Holton Hall	II	B1070, Holton St. Mary			5 June 1987	TM0565636935; 51°59′34″N 0°59′39″E		1036980	Upload Photo	Q26288657
Holton St Mary War Memorial	II	B1070, CO7 6NP, Holton St. Mary	war memorial		7 January 2020	TM0590936778; 51°59′29″N 0°59′51″E		1465009	Holton St Mary War Memorial More images	Q81653520
Laburnam House	II	B1070, Holton St. Mary			5 June 1987	TM0594736759; 51°59′28″N 0°59′53″E		1036979	Upload Photo	Q26288656
Lampitts	II	B1070, Holton St. Mary			5 June 1987	TM0597536740; 51°59′27″N 0°59′55″E		1351595	Upload Photo	Q26634683
Dewlands Farmhouse	II	Sand Pits Lane, Holton St. Mary			5 June 1987	TM0433636726; 51°59′29″N 0°58′29″E		1036986	Upload Photo	Q26288664
Lark Hall	II	Sand Pits Lane, Holton St. Mary			22 February 1955	TM0503737021; 51°59′38″N 0°59′06″E		1036983	Upload Photo	Q26288660
Pintins	II	Sand Pits Lane, Holton St. Mary			5 June 1987	TM0479836835; 51°59′32″N 0°58′53″E		1036984	Upload Photo	Q26288661
Tiffins	II	Sand Pits Lane, Holton St. Mary			5 June 1987	TM0471736868; 51°59′33″N 0°58′49″E		1036985	Upload Photo	Q26288662

== See also ==
- Grade I listed buildings in Suffolk
- Grade II* listed buildings in Suffolk

== Sources ==
- Bettely, James; Pevsner, Nikolaus (2015) [1961], Suffolk: West, The Buildings of England, New Haven and London: Yale University Press, ISBN 978-0-300-19655-9
