= William Gray (jockey) =

British jockey

William Gray was a British jockey of the 19th century. He was the joint Champion Jockey of 1870, along with Charlie Maidment. He is one of the few British jockeys to have won the championship without winning any of the British Classic Races.

== Bibliography ==
- Wright, Howard (1986). The Encyclopaedia of Flat Racing. London: Robert Hale. ISBN 0-7090-2639-0.
