= Henry Constable (disambiguation) =

Henry Constable was an English poet and author on religious matters of the Elizabethan period.

Henry Constable may also refer to:

- Henry Constable (of Burton Constable) (c.1559–1608), English politician
- Henry Constable, 1st Viscount of Dunbar (1588–1645), English Catholic knight in the Peerage of Scotland
- Henry Constable known as Harry Constable (1854–1881), British jockey
