= Lottery (horse, foaled 1820) =

British Thoroughbred racehorse

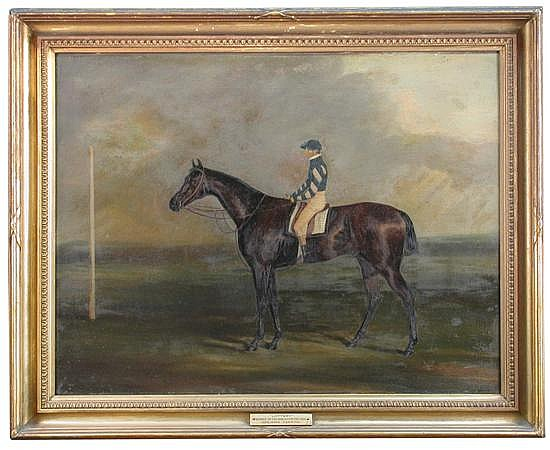
- Sire: Tramp
- Grandsire: Dick Andrews
- Dam: Mandane
- Damsire: Potoooooooo
- Sex: Stallion
- Foaled: 1820
- Country: Great Britain
- Colour: Brown
- Record: 11 wins

Lottery (1820 – 1845) was a British racehorse and sire. He won 11 races during his career, then was a successful sire.

== Background ==
Lottery was a talented horse that did not live up to expectations due in part to mismanagement and temperament issues.

== Racing career ==
Lottery won 11 races during his career, including the King's Plate at Newcastle, Fitzwilliams Stakes, York Cup, and Doncaster Cup.

== Stud career ==
Lottery's influence on jumping horses was notable with no less than eight winners of the Grand National within six generations.

Notable offspring:

- Chorister (1828) - won 1831 St Leger Stakes
- Lottery (1829) - won 1839 Grand National
- Sheet Anchor (1832) - continued the Joe Andrews branch of the Eclipse sire line

== Sire line tree ==
- Lottery
  - Chorister
  - Consul
    - Hamlet
    - Joe Chalmers
  - Tetotum
  - Lottery
  - Satin
    - Septimus
      - Porus
  - Saturn
    - Idle Boy
      - Pretty Boy
        - Gabier
  - Alteruter
    - Meudon
  - Inheritor
    - Godfrey
    - The Best Of Three
    - Sheraton
    - Testator
  - Red Rover
  - Zohrab
  - Cavendish
  - Lucifer
  - Luck's All
  - Sheet Anchor
    - Arcanus
    - Sirikol
    - Weatherbit
      - Weathergage
        - Misty Morn
      - Drumour
      - Beadsman
        - The Palmer
        - Blue Gown
        - Rosicrucian
        - Pero Gomez
        - Alvarez
        - Bethnal Green
        - Saxon
        - Coeruleus
        - Vasco Di Gama
        - Jolly Friar
      - Kelpie
        - Fireworks
        - Kingfisher
        - Newbold
        - Warlock
      - Uncle Ned
      - Neptunus
        - Young Apropros
        - Neptun
      - Beldemonio
        - Fechter
      - Brown Bread
        - Whitebait
        - Hilarious
        - Toastmaster
        - Hominy
        - Simnel
        - Sweetbread
      - Fair Wind
      - Mandrake
        - Sheldrake
      - Warlike
        - Rataplan
    - Collingwood
      - Potenate
        - Regno
      - Sultan
    - The Admiral
    - Malton
      - Sylvain
      - Black Eyes
    - Biron
    - Crown Prince
      - Pride Of Prussia
  - The Carpenter
  - Verulam
    - Vulcan
      - Volcano
    - Grimston
    - Wanderer

== Pedigree ==
Pedigree of Lottery (GB), brown horse, 1820
Sire Tramp (GB) 1810	Dick Andrews; 1797	Joe Andrews	Eclipse*
Sire Tramp (GB) 1810	Dick Andrews; 1797	Joe Andrews	Amaranda
Sire Tramp (GB) 1810	Dick Andrews; 1797	Highflyer mare	Highflyer^
Sire Tramp (GB) 1810	Dick Andrews; 1797	Highflyer mare	Cardinal Puff mare
Sire Tramp (GB) 1810	Gohanna mare 1803	Gohanna	Mercury^
Sire Tramp (GB) 1810	Gohanna mare 1803	Gohanna	Sister to Challenger^
Sire Tramp (GB) 1810	Gohanna mare 1803	Fraxinella	Trentham*
Sire Tramp (GB) 1810	Gohanna mare 1803	Fraxinella	Woodpecker mare^
Dam Mandane (GB) 1800	Potoooooooo; 1773	Eclipse*	Marske*
Dam Mandane (GB) 1800	Potoooooooo; 1773	Eclipse*	Spilletta*
Dam Mandane (GB) 1800	Potoooooooo; 1773	Sportsmistress	Sportsman
Dam Mandane (GB) 1800	Potoooooooo; 1773	Sportsmistress	Golden Locks
Dam Mandane (GB) 1800	Young Camilla; 1787	Woodpecker*^	Herod*^
Dam Mandane (GB) 1800	Young Camilla; 1787	Woodpecker*^	Miss Ramsden*
Dam Mandane (GB) 1800	Young Camilla; 1787	Camilla	Trentham*
Dam Mandane (GB) 1800	Young Camilla; 1787	Camilla	Coquette

* Lottery is inbred 4S x 5S x 3D to the stallion Eclipse, meaning that he appears fourth generation and fifth generation (via Mercury)^ on the sire side of his pedigree and third generation on the dam side of his pedigree.

*^ Lottery is inbred 5S x 3D to the stallion Woodpecker, meaning that he appears fifth generation (via Woodpecker mare)^ on the sire side of his pedigree and third generation on the dam side of his pedigree.

* Lottery is inbred 4S x 4D to the stallion Trentham, meaning that he appears fourth generation on the sire side of his pedigree and fourth generation on the dam side of his pedigree.

*^ Lottery is inbred 5S x 5S x 6S x 4D to the stallion Herod, meaning that he appears fifth generation twice (via Highflyer and Sister to Challenger)^ and sixth generation once (via Woodpecker mare)^ on the sire side of his pedigree and fourth generation once on the dam side of his pedigree.
