= Holton St Mary =

Village in Suffolk, England

Coordinates: 51.991°N 1.0°E

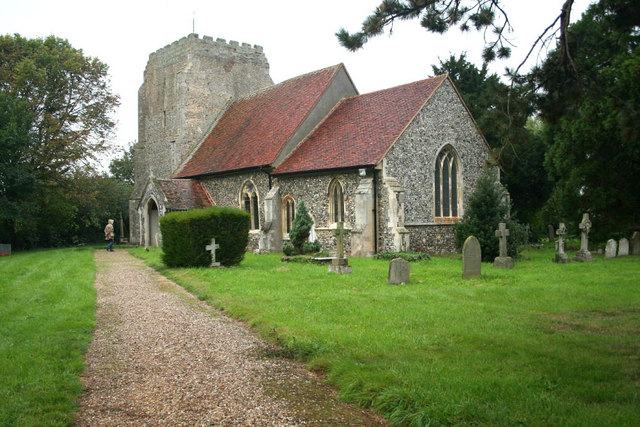
- St Mary's Church, Holton St Mary

- Location within Suffolk
- Population: 220 (2005)
- Civil parish: Holton St Mary
- District: Babergh
- Shire county: Suffolk
- Region: East
- Country: England
- Sovereign state: United Kingdom
- Post town: Colchester
- Postcode district: CO7
- UK Parliament: South Suffolk

Holton St Mary is a village and civil parish in the Babergh district, in the county of Suffolk, England. Located on the B1070 around five miles south-west of Ipswich and half a mile from the A12 (which forms the parish's south-east boundary). In 2021 the parish had a population of 236.

The western end of the parish is part of the Dedham Vale Area of Outstanding Natural Beauty and the Higham meadow nature reserve.

It was the birthplace of the 13 times British flat racing Champion Jockey, Nat Flatman.
