= British Flat Jockeys Championship 2013 =

The 2013 British Flat Jockeys Championship was the competition to find the jockey with the most wins in Great Britain during the traditional flat racing season from the Lincoln Handicap meeting at Doncaster Racecourse in March until the November Handicap meeting at the same racecourse in November. It was won by Richard Hughes for the second year in a row.

== Final table ==
Rank	Jockey	Wins	Rides	Strike rate
1	Richard Hughes	202		
2	Ryan Moore	182		
3	Silvestre de Sousa	152		
4	William Buick	113		
5	Paul Hanagan	106		
