= British Flat Jockeys Championship 2012 =

The 2012 British Flat Jockeys Championship was the competition to find the jockey with the most wins in Great Britain during the traditional flat racing season from the Lincoln Handicap meeting at Doncaster Racecourse in March until the November Handicap meeting at the same racecourse in November. It was won by Richard Hughes for the first time in his career.

== Final table ==
| Rank | Jockey | Wins | Rides | Strike rate |
|---|---|---|---|---|
| 1 | Richard Hughes | 172 | | |
| 2 | Silvestre de Sousa | 132 | | |
| 3 | William Buick | 124 | | |
| 4 | Ryan Moore | 115 | | |
| 5 | Paul Hanagan | 108 | | |
