= Sam Kenyon =

British jockey

Sam Kenyon (fl. 1855–1874) was a British jockey who was British Champion jockey in 1866, riding 123 winners. He has been described as "the most fashionable lightweight [jockey] of the mid-Victorian period." Amongst his key victories were the City and Suburban Handicap on Delight, the Manchester Cup on Retrousse, the Liverpool Autumn Cup on Beeswing and the Goodwood Stakes and Doncaster Cup on Rama. He never won a Classic, but it has been suggested he would have won th 1869 2,000 Guineas on Belladrum, if he had not defied trainer's orders.

== Bibliography ==
- Mortimer, Roger; Onslow, Richard; Willett, Peter (1978). Biographical Encyclopaedia of British Racing. London: Macdonald and Jane's. ISBN 0-354-08536-0.
- Wright, Howard (1986). The Encyclopaedia of Flat Racing. London: Robert Hale. ISBN 0-7090-2639-0.
