= Henry Hawley Smart =

English army officer and novelist

Henry Hawley Smart (1833–1893) was an English army officer and novelist, who wrote as Capt. Hawley Smart. He was praised for his realistic racing and hunting scenes, and depictions of military incidents.

== Family ==
Smart was born in Dover, Kent on 3 June 1833. He was the son of Major George Smart and his wife Katherine, sister of Sir Joseph Henry Hawley, 3rd Baronet, a wealthy racehorse owner whose wife Sarah Crosbie came from a landed Sussex family. His grandfather, Col. Henry Smart, had been governor of Dover Castle earlier in the century. Smart was married in 1883 to Alice Ellen, daughter of John Smart of Budleigh Salterton, Devon. Smart died at his residence there, Laburnum Cottage, West Hill, on 8 January 1893. His wife survived him.

== Army career ==
Smart was privately educated and then commissioned in the British Army as an ensign in the 1st Regiment of Foot (Royal Scots) in 1849, through the influence of the future Lord Raglan. He served through the Crimean War, being promoted to captain in 1855. He sailed in 1857 for India, where he served during the Indian Mutiny. In 1858 he switched to the 17th (Leicestershire) Regiment and was stationed in Canada. He left Quebec in 1864 and then sold out of the army.

== Novels ==
Losses on the turf spurred Smart into becoming a novelist. Among his models were the Irishman Charles Lever (1806–1872) and the Scotsman George Whyte-Melville (1821–1878). Beginning with Breezie Langton: a Story of Fifty-Two to Fifty-Five (1869, several times reprinted), one of the few British novels set in the Crimean War, he produced 38 novels in all, the last being A Racing Rubber (1895), which appeared posthumously. In line with practice at the time, many appeared first in instalments in periodicals, such as St James's Magazine, or in weekly parts in newspapers. They have been described as "novels of 'society', military life, racing, and hunting... entertainment rather than literature," whose weaknesses of plot and dialogue were offset by realistic racing and hunting scenes and by military incidents often drawn from his own experience.

Henry Hawley Smart was listed in the "Novelist" category in a poll on "Who are the Greatest Living Englishmen?" published in the Pall Mall Gazette in 1885. George Bernard Shaw in an 1888 lecture made a comparison of the readerships of Smart and George Eliot (1819–1880): "There are love affairs in Captain Hawley Smart's novels: so there in are in George Eliot's; but I suspect that the admirers of Captain Hawley Smart find George Eliot rather heavy. And I believe that 'rather heavy' means to them 'comparatively unreal'. The things of which Captain Hawley Smith writes, seen as he describes them, are vivid and interesting – pleasant parts of his readers' daily life and thought. On the other hand, the admirers of George Eliot do not see these things as Captain Hawley Smart sees them, and take no interest in the excitements and gaieties incidental to them. For example, one cannot imagine a disciple of George Eliot reading a sporting column of a newspaper, or sympathizing with the good luck of a hero who is saved from ruin by winning a fortune at the expense of the other gamblers on a racecourse. Nor can we imagine a disciple of Captain Hawley Smart subscribing to Mind, or recognizing any sense or importance in the scruples of the man who refuses to bet."

The Great Tontine (1881) was republished in 1984 in an anthology of four novels entitled Victorian Villainies, edited by Graham Greene with an introduction by his brother Hugh Greene. This was reprinted in 1995.

== Bibliography ==
- Breezie Langton, 3 vols (London: Bentley, 1869)
- Bitter is the Rind, etc., 3 vols (London: Bentley, 1870)
- Cecile: or, Modern Idolaters, etc., 3 vols (London: Bentley, 1871)
- False Cards 3 vols (London: Hurst and Blackett, 1872)
- A Race for a Wife 3 vols (London: Hurst and Blackett, 1872)
- Broken Bonds 3 vols (London: Hurst and Blackett, 1874)
- Two Kisses 3 vols (London: Bentley, 1875)
- Courtship: or, 1720 in 1860 3 vols (London: Chapman and Hall, 1876)
- Bound to Win: A Tale of the Turf 3 vols (London: Chapman and Hall, 1877)
- Sunshine and Snow: A Novel 3 vols (London: Chapman and Hall, 1878)
- Play or Pay. A Novelette (London, 1878)
- Social Sinners 3 vols (London: Chapman and Hall, 1880)
- Great Tontine: A Novel 3 vols (London: Chapman and Hall, 1881)
- At Fault: A Novel 3 vols (London: Chapman and Hall, 1883)
- Hard Lines: A Novel 3 vols (London: Chapman and Hall, 1883)
- From Post to Finish: A Novel 3 vols (London: Chapman and Hall, 1884)
- The Death Ride. A Story of Thanksgiving Day, 27 February 1872 (in the collection Praed (R. M.) Mrs.: For their Sakes, etc., 1884)
- Tie and Trick: A Melodramatic Story 3 vols (London: Chapman and Hall, 1885)
- The Outsider: A Novel 2 vols (London: F. V. White, 1886)
- Plucked: A Tale of a Trap, with other authors (London: Diprose and Bateman, 1886)
- Struck Down. A Tale of Devon (London: F. Warne and Co., 1886)
- Bad to Beat. A Novel (London: F. V. White, 1886)
- A False Start: A Novel 3 vols (London: Chapman and Hall, 1887)
- Saddle and Sabre 3 vols (London: Chapman and Hall, 1887)
- Cleverly Won. A Romance of the Grand National. A Novelette (London: F. V. White, 1887)
- The Master of Rathkelly 2 vols (London: F. V. White, 1888)
- The Pride of the Paddock (London: F. V. White, 1888)
- Long Odds: A Novel 3 vols (London: F. V. White, 1889)
- The Last Coup. A Novelette (London: F. V. White, 1889)
- Without Love or Licence: A Tale of South Devon 3 vols (London: Chatto and Windus, 1890)
- A Black Business. A Novelette (London: F. V. White, 1890)
- Beatrice and Benedick: A Romance of the Crimea 2 vols (London: F. V. White, 1891)
- The Plunger: A Turf Tragedy of Five-and-Twenty Years Ago 2 vols (London: F. V. White, 1891)
- Thrice Past the Post. A Novel (London: F. V. White, 1891)
- Vanity's Daughter. A Novel (London: F. V. White, 1893)
- A Racing Rubber 2 vols (London: F. V. White, 1895)
