= Chorister (horse) =

British-bred Thoroughbred racehorse

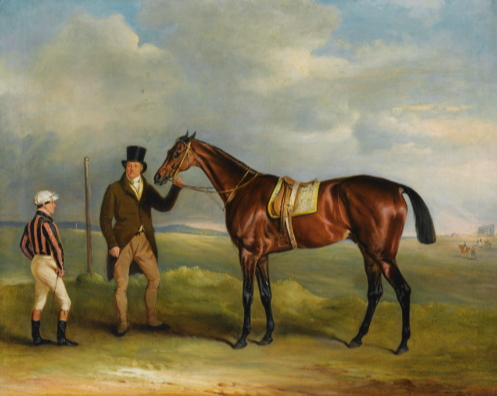
- The Marquis of Cleveland's 'Chorister, winner of the 1831 St. Leger, held by his trainer John Smith by John Ferneley
- Sire: Lottery
- Grandsire: Tramp
- Dam: Chorus mare
- Damsire: Chorus
- Sex: Stallion
- Foaled: 1828
- Country: United Kingdom
- Colour: Bay
- Breeder: John Smith or Lord Cleveland
- Owner: William Vane, 1st Duke of Cleveland
- Trainer: John Smith
- Record: 7: 4-2-0

Major wins
- St Leger Stakes (1831)

Chorister (1828–1833) was a British Thoroughbred racehorse best known for winning the classic St Leger Stakes in 1831. In a racing career which lasted from May 1830 until October 1831 he ran seven times and won four races. In the St Leger, he was not regarded as a serious contender but was given an extremely well-judged ride by John Barham Day to win by a short head from The Saddler. Chorister remained in training for two further seasons but never raced again and died in the autumn of 1833.

== Background ==
Chorister was a bay horse standing 15.3 hands high bred by Mr. John Smith. As a yearling he was bought for 300 guineas by William Vane, Marquess of Cleveland, although the General Stud Book suggested that Cleveland bred the colt himself.

Chorister's sire Lottery was a talented but temperamental horse, whose most important success came in the 1825 Doncaster Cup. At stud his other progeny included the Grand National winner Lottery and the influential stallion Sheet Anchor. Chorister was one of Lottery's first crop of foals and he was said to bear a strong resemblance to his sire. Chorister's dam, an unnamed mare by Chorus, was a granddaughter of Anticipation, whose other descendants included the outstanding racehorse and broodmare Alice Hawthorn.

== Racing career ==
=== 1830: two-year-old season ===
Chorister began his racing career at York Racecourse on 18 May when he was one of eleven runners in a sweepstakes for two-year-old colts and fillies. Ridden by Thomas Lye, he started the 6/4 favourite and attracted additional attention as the first of Lottery's offspring to appear on the racecourse. The start was delayed by several false starts leading Chorister to become agitated and to kick out at the other horses. Chorister took the lead in the closing stages and held off a strong challenge from Mr Walker's filly Victoire (ridden by Bill Scott) to win by a head. More than four months after his successful debut, Chorister ran in the Champagne Stakes on the opening day of the St Leger meeting at Doncaster. He started second favourite but appeared to be "dead amiss" and finished outside the first four in the race won by Thomas Houldsworth's filly Frederica.

=== 1831: three-year-old season ===
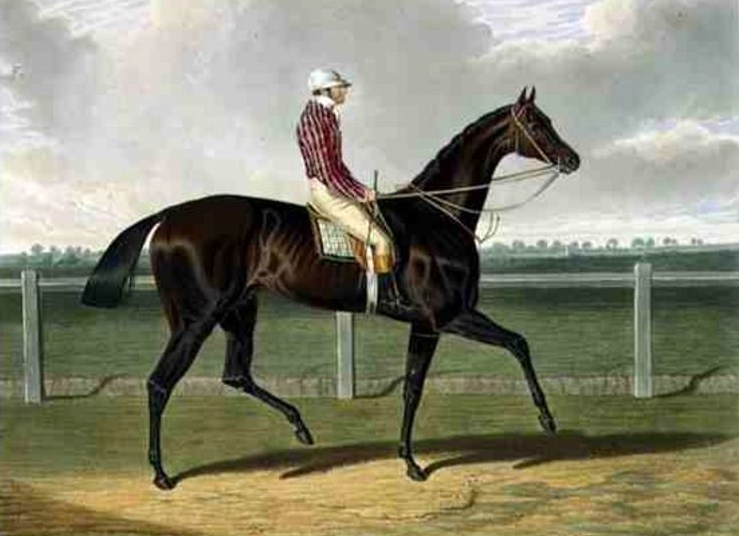
Chorister by John Frederick Herring, Sr.

Chorister made his three-year-old debut on 10 May at York in "The Shorts", a one-mile sweepstakes for which his only opponent was The Saddler, who had won the York St Leger on the previous afternoon. The Saddler led from the start and won by a length, leading the Sporting Magazine to comment that "Chorister appears to have lost all his voice". After a break of three months, Chorister returned to York in August where he contested weight-for-age subscription race over two miles. Ridden by Lye, he started the 6/4 favourite and won from the five-year-old mare Fortitude.

On 20 September, Chorister was one of twenty-four colts and fillies to contest the Great St Leger Stakes at Doncaster. The Saddler started 3/1 favourite ahead of Lord Cleveland's more fancied runner Marcus on 7/2, while Chorister, ridden by the southern jockey John Barham Day and started a 20/1 outsider. In a strongly run race, Day restrained Chorister just behind the leaders before producing the colt with a strong run on the outside in the straight. Well inside the final furlong, Chorister made a "tremendous rush" to catch and overtake The Saddler and win by a short head. The New Sporting Magazine expressed the view that The Saddler was by far the best horse in the race, and that Chorister's victory had been almost entirely due to Day's superior jockeyship.

Two days later, over the same course and distance, Chorister was matched against Liverpool, a horse who had finished unplaced in the St Leger, in the Gascoigne Stakes. The race was run at a slow pace before the horses accelerated entering the straight and after a strongly contested finish the two colts crossed the line together with the judge declaring dead heat. Lord Cleveland made an offer to divide the stakes, but Liverpool's owner insisted on a run-off later that afternoon. The deciding heat was again run at a very slow pace before the straight, but on this occasion Liverpool showed the superior acceleration to win by two lengths. Commenting on the fact that Chorister seemed better suited to racing in a large field of runners the Sporting Magazine's correspondent wrote that "it was more agreeable to him to sing with a full orchestra than take a part in a duet".

On 14 October, Chorister appeared for the final time at Northallerton, where he contested the local Gold Cup. He won the two-mile event from Lady Elizabeth.

Chorister never ran after his win at Northallerton. The New Sporting Magazine offered the opinion that he would be a "formidable goer" as a four-year-old, but he did not contest any races in 1832. According to the General Stud Book, Chorister died as a five-year-old in 1833. The New Sporting Magazine reporting on the 1833 St Leger meeting in September 1833 reported that Chorister had died "a day or two" previously.

== Pedigree ==
Pedigree of Chorister (GB), bay stallion, 1828
Sire Lottery (GB) 1820	Tramp; 1810	Dick Andrews	Joe Andrews*^
Sire Lottery (GB) 1820	Tramp; 1810	Dick Andrews	Highflyer mare
Sire Lottery (GB) 1820	Tramp; 1810	Gohanna mare	Gohanna
Sire Lottery (GB) 1820	Tramp; 1810	Gohanna mare	Fraxinella
Sire Lottery (GB) 1820	Mandane; 1800	Potoooooooo	Eclipse*
Sire Lottery (GB) 1820	Mandane; 1800	Potoooooooo	Sportsmistress
Sire Lottery (GB) 1820	Mandane; 1800	Young Camilla	Woodpecker*
Sire Lottery (GB) 1820	Mandane; 1800	Young Camilla	Camilla
Dam Chorus mare (GB) 1815	Chorus; 1802	Trumpator	Conductor
Dam Chorus mare (GB) 1815	Chorus; 1802	Trumpator	Brunette
Dam Chorus mare (GB) 1815	Chorus; 1802	Sea-Fowl	Woodpecker*
Dam Chorus mare (GB) 1815	Chorus; 1802	Sea-Fowl	Middlesex
Dam Chorus mare (GB) 1815	Orville mare 1811	Orville	Beningbrough*
Dam Chorus mare (GB) 1815	Orville mare 1811	Orville	Evelina
Dam Chorus mare (GB) 1815	Orville mare 1811	Anticipation	Beningbrough*
Dam Chorus mare (GB) 1815	Orville mare 1811	Anticipation	Expectation (Family:4-b)

*^ Chorister is inbred 5S x 4S to the stallion Eclipse, meaning that he appears fifth generation (via Joe Andrews)^ and fourth generation on the sire side of his pedigree.

* Chorister is inbred 4S x 4D to the stallion Woodpecker, meaning that he appears fourth generation on the sire side of his pedigree and fourth generation on the dam side of his pedigree.

* Chorister is inbred 4D x 4D to the stallion Beningbrough, meaning that he appears fourth generation twice on the dam side of his pedigree.
