= Willie Lane =

British jockey

Personal information
- Born: 1883
- Died: 1920 (aged 36–37)
- Occupation: Jockey

Horse racing career
- Sport: Horse racing

Major racing wins
- British Classic Race wins as jockey: 1,000 Guineas (1904); Epsom Oaks (1904); St Leger Stakes (1904)

Racing awards
- British flat racing Champion Jockey (1902)

Significant horses
- Pretty Polly

William "Willie" or "Wallie" Lane (1883–1920) was a British flat racing jockey.

He was the Champion Jockey of 1902, but is most commonly remembered for his feats riding the outstanding Pretty Polly, who in 1904 became only the fifth filly to win the British Fillies Triple Crown. Besides the Triple Crown, she also won the Coronation Stakes, Nassau Stakes and Park Hill Stakes.

Other races he won in his career include the St. James's Palace Stakes, Ascot Gold Cup, Norfolk Stakes, Gordon Stakes, Goodwood Cup, Yorkshire Oaks, Gimcrack Stakes and Doncaster Cup. Having achieved the Triple Crown, one of the rarest feats in racing, his career was cut short after a serious fall in a selling race at Lingfield. He died, aged 37, in 1920. Despite his short-lived career, he was still ranked at number 32 in the Racing Post's Top 50 jockeys of the 20th century.

Lane was the son of a jobmaster from Chelsea.

== Major wins ==
(United Kingdom) Great Britain

=== Classic races ===
- 1,000 Guineas – Pretty Polly (1904)
- Oaks – Pretty Polly (1904)
- St. Leger – Pretty Polly (1904)
