= Charlie Maidment =

British jockey (c. 1844–1926)

Charles Maidment
Personal information
- Born: c. 1844 Witchampton, Dorset
- Died: 1926
- Occupation: Jockey

Horse racing career
- Sport: Horse racing

Major racing wins
- British Classic Race wins as jockey: 1,000 Guineas; Epsom Oaks; Epsom Derby (2); St Leger Stakes (2)

Racing awards
- British flat racing Champion Jockey twice (1870, 1871) (tied both years)

Honours
- Fillies' Triple Crown (1871)

Significant horses
- Hannah

Charles Maidment (c. 1844–1926) was a British jockey, prominent in the early 1870s.

He was joint British Champion jockey in two successive years, 1870 and 1871, although is generally regarded as inferior to other jockeys of the time such as George Fordham and Tom Cannon, Sr. Besides his Championships, his main achievement was winning the Fillies' Triple Crown on Hannah in 1871.

He mainly rode for trainer Joseph Hayhoe and his major owners, Baron Meyer de Rothschild and Alexander and Hector Baltazzi. He retired in 1891 and was forced by financial circumstance to ride out for Newmarket stables until old age.

== Classic race victories ==
(United Kingdom) Great Britain

- 1,000 Guineas – Hannah (1871)
- Epsom Oaks – Hannah (1871)
- Epsom Derby – Cremorne (1872), Kisber (1876)
- St. Leger – Hannah (1871), Wenlock (1872)

== Bibliography ==
- Mortimer, Roger; Onslow, Richard; Willett, Peter (1978). Biographical Encyclopaedia of British Racing. London: Macdonald and Jane's. ISBN 0-354-08536-0.
