= Josephine Gordon =

British jockey (born 1993)

Personal information
- Born: 16 May 1993 (age 33)
- Occupation: Jockey

Horse racing career
- Sport: Horse racing

Racing awards
- British flat racing Champion Apprentice (2016); Lester Awards; Apprentice of the Year (2016); Lady Jockey of the Year (2016)

Josephine Gordon (born 16 May 1993) is a British jockey who competes in Flat racing. In 2016 Gordon won the British flat racing Champion Apprentice title, becoming only the third female jockey to win that title after Hayley Turner and Amy Ryan.

Gordon began her association with horses at her mother's livery stable but her early jockey career saw a period of 18 months between her first and second winners. She worked with retired jockey John Reid as a coach and became apprentice jockey at the stable of trainer Stan Moore. Her second winner came in June 2015 and she progressed to ride more than 70 winners in 2016, including 50 in the apprentice championship. She has also ridden for major trainers Sir Michael Stoute and Hugo Palmer. Shortly after clinching her title she was given a first ride by the Godolphin Racing organisation. In December 2016 Gordon was honoured twice at the annual Lester Awards, receiving the awards for Apprentice of the Year and Lady Jockey of the Year.

In 2017, she won her first big handicap race, the Victoria Cup at Ascot for William Haggas. Gordon rode her first group race winner when Koropick won the Chipchase Stakes at Newcastle in July 2017. She followed it up with a second Group 3 win for Hugo Palmer in the Princess Royal Stakes on Apphia on 29 September. She beat her 2016 total of winners and finished 24th in the jockeys' championship. In November she rode her 100th winner of the year, becoming the second female jockey to reach this milestone after Hayley Turner in 2008. In February 2019 Gordon decided to go freelance.
