= Blue Gown =

British-bred Thoroughbred racehorse

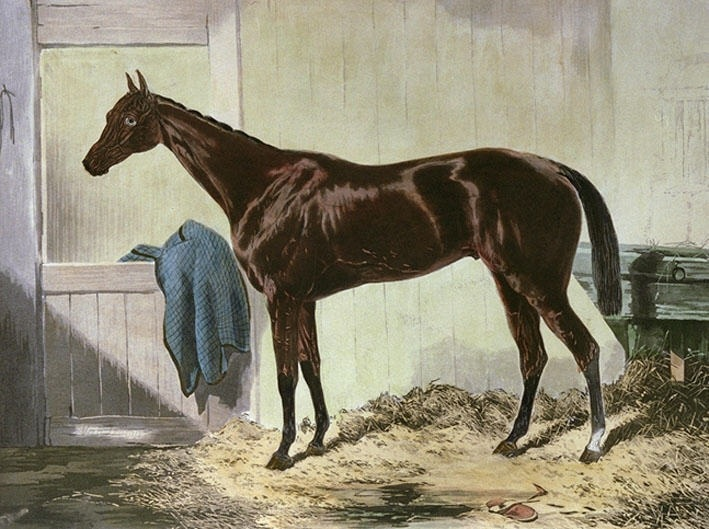
- Sire: Beadsman
- Grandsire: Weatherbit
- Dam: Bas Bleu
- Damsire: Stockwell
- Sex: Stallion
- Foaled: 1865
- Country: United Kingdom of Great Britain and Ireland
- Colour: Bay
- Breeder: Sir Joseph Hawley
- Owner: Sir Joseph Hawley; C J Lefevre; Princess Pless; James R. Keene
- Trainer: John Porter
- Record: 30: 18-4-0 (incomplete)

Major wins
- Sunning Hill Stakes (1867); Fern Hill Stakes (1867); Clearwell Stakes (1867); Derby Stakes (1868); Ascot Gold Cup (1868); Fitzwilliam Stakes (1868); Craven Stakes (1869); Newmarket Biennial Stakes (1869); Epsom Trial Stakes (1869); Goodwood Craven Stakes (1869); Winchester Queen's Plate (1869)

Blue Gown (1865 – November 25, 1880) was a British Thoroughbred racehorse that was the winner of the 1868 Epsom Derby and Ascot Gold Cup. He was one of the best colts of his generation at two, three years and four of age, but his form declined in 1870 after an unsuccessful period in France. He was retired to stud, where he had considerable success as a sire of winners in Germany. Blue Gown died in 1880 while being shipped to the United States.

== Background ==
Blue Gown was a bay horse standing 15.3 hands high, sired by the 1858 Epsom Derby winner Beadsman out of the Stockwell bred mare Bas Bleu. Blue Gown derived his name from the residents of medieval hospitals. The Beadsman sometimes wore blue gowns. Royal beadsmen received their alms from the reigning monarch in Scotland. Blue Gown was bred and owned by Sir Joseph Hawley. The colt was trained by John Porter, first at Cannon's Heath and then at Kingsclere.

== Racing career ==
=== 1867: two-year-old season ===
In 1867, Blue Gown won the Sunning Hill Stakes on his debut at Ascot Racecourse in spring and then finished third to the year's outstanding two-year-old Lady Elizabeth in the Weston Stakes at Bath. At Royal Ascot in June he won the Fern Hill Stakes over half a mile, racing against older horses. After a three month break he returned for the Champagne Stakes at Doncaster in September. He finished first, beating Virtue by half a length, but was disqualified when his jockey, John Wells weighed in more than two pounds over the stipulated weight. Blue Gown finished last in a sweepstakes at the same meeting.

Blue Gown's next race of the season was held in private. In early October, Hawley tried his three best two-year-olds against each other, and Blue Gown finished third behind Rosicrucian and the previously unraced filly Green Sleeve. Blue Gown returned to form to win the Clearwell Stakes at Newmarket's Second October meeting, winning very easily by one and a half lengths from St Ronan. At the same meeting Rosicrucian won the Criterion Stakes and then finished second to Green Sleeve in the Middle Park Stakes.

=== 1868: three-year-old season ===
Blue Gown began the 1868 as Hawley's third-string three-year-old and did not run in the 2000 Guineas, in which Green Sleeve and Rosicrucian ran poorly. At Newmarket in spring Blue Gown dead-heated with to The Earl in a Biennial Stakes and won two minor races. In a supposedly private trial race at Kingsclere (which soon became common knowledge), Blue Gown was beaten a neck by Rosicrucian as part of his preparation for The Derby.

Hawley continued to regard Blue Gown as inferior to his stable companions, but John Wells chose to ride him at Epsom and the colt was heavily supported in the betting. In the Derby he started 7/2 second favourite in a field of eighteen runners behind Lady Elizabeth on 7/4. Before the race he impressed observers with his free, long-striding action. The race began after three or four false starts and it was immediately apparent that Lady Elizabeth, who had not taken part in the pre-race parade, was struggling and had no chance. Wells positioned Blue Gown just behind the leaders and turned into the straight in third place, at which point the outsider King Alfred took the lead and Hawley's other two runners began to struggle. In the final furlong Wells produced Blue Gown with a challenge down the centre of the course, overtaking King Alfred near the finish and winning by half a length. Speculum finished third, Rosicrucian fifth, and Green Sleeve ninth. The Ascot Gold Cup in June saw a near repeat of the Derby result, as Blue Gown won from Speculum and King Alfred.

In autumn, Blue Gown won the Fitzwilliam Stakes at Doncaster before moving on to Newmarket in October. He finished unplaced under a weight of 123 pounds in the two and a quarter mile Cesarewitch and then finished second carrying 126 pounds in the Cambridgeshire Handicap over nine furlongs.

=== Later racing career ===
In 1869 Blue Gown won eight of his ten races including the Craven Stakes at Newmarket (a walkover), the Trial Stakes at Epsom and the Newmarket Biennial as well as finishing second to the filly Brigantine in the Ascot Gold Cup. Late in the year he was sold to a syndicate for £5,000 and exported to France. It was hoped to run him in major continental races but he made only one appearance, finishing unplaced under a heavy weight in an event at Lyon in 1870 before being sold again and returned to England. He failed to recapture his previous form, winning one minor handicap race at Newmarket in five appearances.

== Stud record ==
Blue Gown was eventually retired from racing as a five-year-old and was sent to Germany as a stud horse, where he was very successful. In 1879, Blue Gown was transferred back to England to the Marden Deer Park Stud in Caterham, Surrey. He was bought by American horseman James R. Keene in 1880 for £13,300 ($20,000) and was placed aboard the steamship Victoria for his trans-Atlantic crossing to New York. The ship ran into very stormy weather on November 25, leading to the destruction of its rudder and to the death of Blue Gown, who thrashed about in his cabin and ruptured a bowel. The body of the horse was cast overboard by the crew into the Atlantic Ocean.

== Sire line tree ==
- Blue Gown
  - Zutzen
    - Tormentor

== Pedigree ==
Pedigree of Blue Gown (GB), bay stallion, 1865
Sire Beadsman (GB) 1855	Weatherbit (GB); 1842	Sheet Anchor	Lottery^
Sire Beadsman (GB) 1855	Weatherbit (GB); 1842	Sheet Anchor	Morgiana
Sire Beadsman (GB) 1855	Weatherbit (GB); 1842	Miss Letty	Priam
Sire Beadsman (GB) 1855	Weatherbit (GB); 1842	Miss Letty	Orville mare
Sire Beadsman (GB) 1855	Mendicant (GB); 1843	Touchstone*	Camel*
Sire Beadsman (GB) 1855	Mendicant (GB); 1843	Touchstone*	Banter*
Sire Beadsman (GB) 1855	Mendicant (GB); 1843	Lady Moore Carew	Tramp*^
Sire Beadsman (GB) 1855	Mendicant (GB); 1843	Lady Moore Carew	Kite
Dam Bas Bleu (GB) 1858	Stockwell (GB); 1849	The Baron	Birdcatcher
Dam Bas Bleu (GB) 1858	Stockwell (GB); 1849	The Baron	Echidna
Dam Bas Bleu (GB) 1858	Stockwell (GB); 1849	Pocahontas	Glencoe
Dam Bas Bleu (GB) 1858	Stockwell (GB); 1849	Pocahontas	Marpessa
Dam Bas Bleu (GB) 1858	Vexation (GB); 1845	Touchstone*	Camel*
Dam Bas Bleu (GB) 1858	Vexation (GB); 1845	Touchstone*	Banter*
Dam Bas Bleu (GB) 1858	Vexation (GB); 1845	Vat	Langar
Dam Bas Bleu (GB) 1858	Vexation (GB); 1845	Vat	Wire (Family: 1-o)

* Blue Gown is inbred 3S x 3D to the stallion Touchstone, meaning that he appears third generation on the sire side of his pedigree and third generation on the dam side of his pedigree.

*^ Blue Gown is inbred 5S x 4S to the stallion Tramp, meaning that he appears fifth generation (via Lottery)^ and fourth generation on the sire side of his pedigree.
