= Saxon (horse) =

19th-century American Thoroughbred racehorse

- Sire: Beadsman
- Grandsire: Weatherbit
- Dam: Girasol
- Damsire: Asteroid
- Sex: Stallion
- Foaled: 1871
- Country: United Kingdom
- Color: Brown
- Breeder: Joseph Hawley
- Owner: Pierre Lorillard
- Trainer: William Pryor
- Record: 8 starts, 2 wins
- Earnings: $5,150 (about $147,000 today)

Major wins
- American Classics wins: Belmont Stakes (1874)

Saxon (1871–1895) was a British-bred American-trained Thoroughbred racehorse that won the 1874 Belmont Stakes, the eighth running of that stakes race.

== Background ==
Saxon was a brown stallion sired by Beadsman, and was bred in England, by Joseph Hawley. (Note: The racing chart for the 1874 Belmont Stakes gives his breeder as Thomas Hawley, but this is contradicted by the American Stud Book and other sources writing after the race.) He was imported into the United States by Pierre Lorillard, along with his dam. Saxon's dam was the imported mare Girasol, who was sired by Asteroid and out of the mare Gillyflower. Gillyflower was sired by Venison.

== Racing career ==
As a two-year-old, Saxon won the 1873 August Stakes.

Saxon won the 1874 Belmont while owned by Pierre Lorillard. This was the eighth running of the stakes race. The race was run on June 13, 1871 at a distance of 1 1/2 miles (i.e. 12 furlongs (2,400 meters)) on a fast track. He finished first by a neck over Grinstead, and third place went to Aaron Pennington. All the horses in the race carried 110 pounds (50 kg), and the value to the winner was $4,200 (about $120,000 today), with the winning time being 2 minutes and 39 1/2 seconds. The winning jockey was George Barbee, and the winning trainer was William Pryor.

In his racing career, Saxon won 2 times out of 8 starts, with total earnings of $5,150 (about $147,000 today).

== Stud record ==
As a breeding stallion, he sired three stakes winners: Gerald out of Girl of the Period by Virgil, Hiawasse out of Vandalite by Vandal, and Zamora out of Zoo Zoo by imported Australian. Gerald, an 1879 brown stallion, won the 1881 Foam Stakes. Hiawasse, an 1879 brown mare, won the 1882 Ladies Handicap, 1881 Monmouth Oaks, and the 1881 Mermaid Stakes. Hiawasse was undefeated as a three-year-old racehorse. Zamora, an 1881 gray mare, won the 1884 Tennessee Oaks.

Saxon was used as a breeding stallion by his owner, Pierre Lorillard. Once, Lorillard's brother George teased Pierre that Saxon's offspring were not as good as expected. Pierre then challenged George to a match race between one of Saxon's offspring against any racehorse that George owned. The result was that Hiawasse won the match race by four horse lengths.

Saxon died in February 1895 at the Cliff Lawn Stud, the farm of W. B. Cheatham, in Nashville.
