= Sir Joseph Henry Hawley, 3rd Baronet =

English Thoroughbred race horse owner and breeder

Sir Joseph Henry Hawley Bt. (1813–1875) was an English thoroughbred race horse owner and breeder.

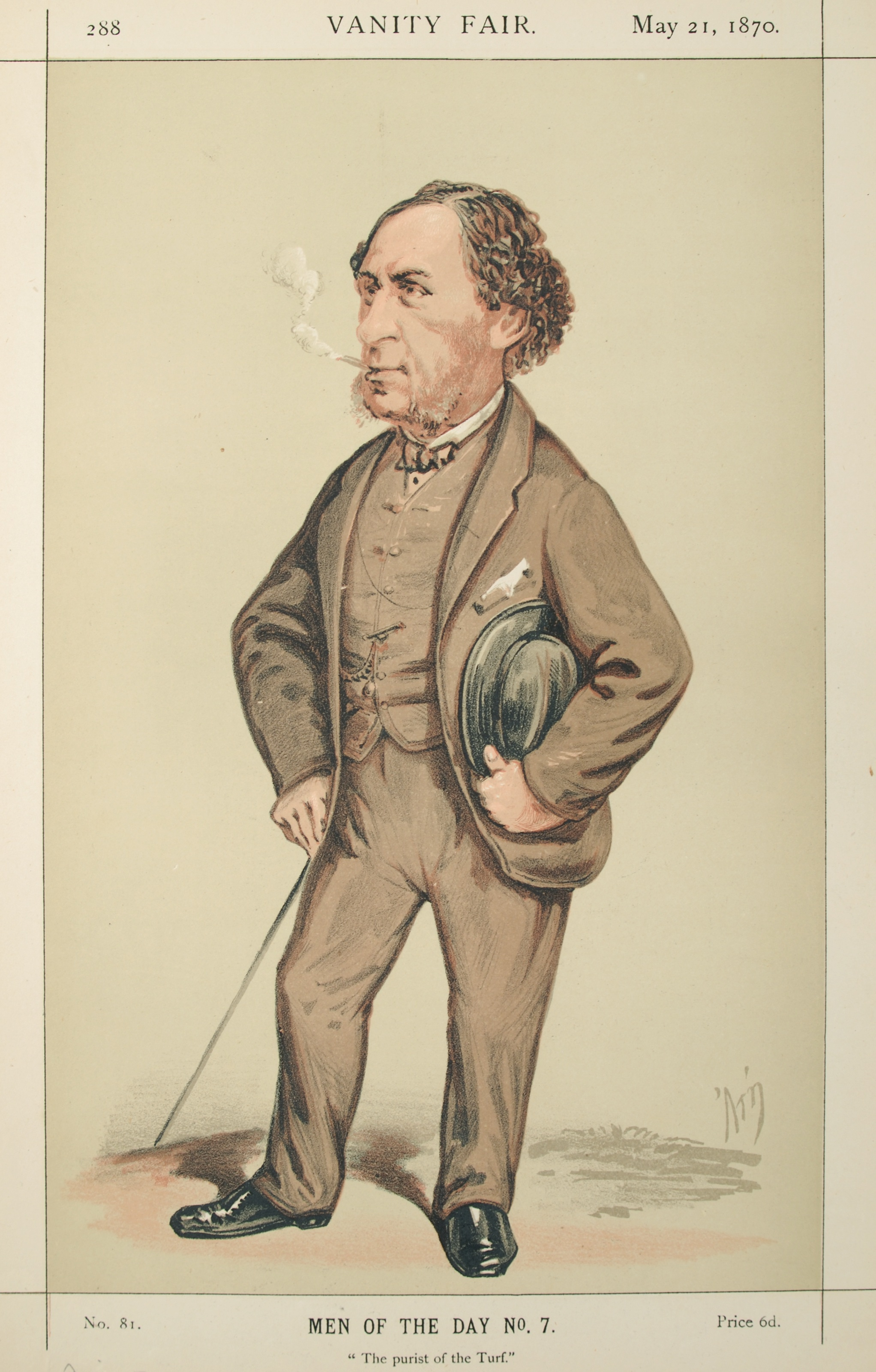
Caricature in Vanity Fair, 21 May 1870

== Life ==
Hawley was born in Harley Street, London, on 27 October 1813, the eldest in a family of ten children. His parents were Sir Henry Hawley, 2nd Baronet, who died in 1831, and his wife Catherine Elizabeth Shaw, daughter of Sir John Gregory Shaw, 5th Baronet.

In his early career Hawley trained privately at Fyfield in Wiltshire. Four of his horses won The Derby: Teddington (1851), Beadsman (1858), Musjid (1859) and Blue Gown (1868). Other classic horseracing wins were Fitz-Roland in the 1858 2,000 Guineas, Aphrodite in the 1851 1,000 Guineas, Miami in the 1847 Oaks and Pero Gomez in the 1869 St Leger. He thus won all five English Classics. He was the breeder of the 1874 Belmont Stakes winner Saxon.

Hawley served as High Sheriff of Kent for 1844. He disposed of land in Shropshire, in the family since the 1st baronet married Dorothy Ashwood of Madeley.

== Family ==
Hawley, then of Leybourne Grange, Kent, married on 18 June 1839, at St George's Hanover Square, Sarah Diana, third daughter of General Sir John Gustavus Crosbie, GCH, of Watergate House, Up Marden, Chichester, Sussex (1765-1843). They had three daughters: Mabel Diana (died 12 April 1852); Mildred Catherine (1849-1902) who married Captain Barrington Campbell, Scots Guards (later Lord Blythswood); and Morna Georgina (1848-1919), who married 25 June 1874 Percy-Fitzhardinge Raymond-Barker of Fariford Park, county Gloucestershire (died 1895).

The novelist Henry Hawley Smart, Hawley's nephew, set several of his books in the racing world.

Coat of arms of Sir Joseph Henry Hawley, 3rd Baronet

Crest
A dexter arm in armour Proper garnished Or holding in the hand a spear in bend sinister point downwards.
Escutcheon
Vert a saltire engrailed Or.

== See also ==
- Hawley baronets

Baronetage of Great Britain
Preceded by Henry Hawley	Baronet (of Leybourne Grange); 1831–1875	Succeeded by Henry Hawley
