= Harry Constable =

British jockey

Personal information
- Born: 1854 Kensal Green, London, England
- Died: 17 February 1881 (aged 26–27) Epson, Surrey, England
- Occupation: Jockey

Horse racing career
- Sport: Horse racing

Major racing wins
- British Classic Race wins as jockey: Epsom Derby (1878)

Racing awards
- British flat racing Champion Jockey (1873)

Significant horses
- Sefton

Henry Constable (1854 – 17 February 1881) was a British flat racing jockey of the Victorian era. He was the Champion Jockey of 1873 with 110 winners, denying the famous Fred Archer his first Jockeys' Championship by 3 wins. He also won the 1878 Derby on Sefton. His fame was short-lived though, and he died at a young age in 1881 aged 26. He was the favourite jockey of Lord Rosebery.

== Bibliography ==
- Tanner, Michael; Cranham, Gerry (1992). Great Jockeys of the Flat. Enfield, Middlesex: Guinness Publishing. ISBN 0-85112-989-7.
