= Elijah Wheatley =

British Jockey

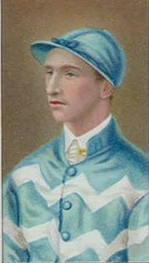
- Illustration of Elijah Wheatley from a 1906 Ogden's cigarette card

Personal information
- Born: c. 1885 Ilkeston, Derbyshire
- Died: October 1951 Ilkeston, Derbyshire
- Occupation: Jockey

Horse racing career
- Sport: Horse racing

Major racing wins
- British Classic Race wins as jockey: St Leger Stakes

Racing awards
- British flat racing Champion Jockey 1905

Significant horses
- Night Hawk, Hornet's Beauty

Elijah "Whippet" Wheatley (c. 1885–1951), nicknamed because of his small stature, was a British flat racing jockey who won the 1905 Jockeys' Championship.

== Career ==
=== Apprentice ===
Wheatley was born in Ilkeston, Derbyshire around 1885. From there, he moved to become apprentice at the yard of William Elsey of Baumber, Lincolnshire.

His career progressed rapidly and in 1905, while still an apprentice, he won 125 races to earn the title of British flat racing Champion Jockey, setting a new record for wins in a year by an apprentice in the process. He was the last Northern-based jockey to win the title until Kevin Darley won in 2000 and the first apprentice ever to win it.

=== Professional ===
On completing his apprenticeship, Elijah went to work at Dobson Peacock's stable in Middleham, Yorkshire where success seemed harder to come by. His seasonal win total began to tail off. In 1908, he only had 25 winners, in 1911 only 17. He did have some success though. In 1913, the last full season before the outbreak of World War I, he won his solitary Classic on Night Hawk in the St Leger and had other big race wins including the Portland Handicap at Doncaster on Hornet's Beauty and in the same year, his win total was back up to 79. During this time he also moved into the heart of British horseracing in Newmarket.

An interesting tale about Wheatley is recounted by his fellow jockey, Steve Donoghue. In the 1917 Champion Stakes Donoghue rode Gay Crusader, a horse which needed to be given a lead. Donoghue asked Wheatley, riding Nassovian, whether he might oblige. Wheatley refused, saying he had been given orders by his trainer to wait. All the other jockeys took the same stance, with the result that all four runners stood still at the start. The starter threatened he would report the jockeys to the stewards, they started at a slow canter, then Donoghue had the idea to crack Nassovian on the rear with his whip. Nassovian set off at speed, Gay Crusader tracked him before pulling past and winning comfortably. At the finish, Wheatley was found tending to the gash across his horse's hind quarters. He asked Donoghue, "What am I going to say when the trainer sees me?". Donoghue quipped back, "Tell him you've been promoted to lance-corporal and you've been given your first stripe."

After the war, though, Wheatley's career began to falter again. In 1923, he was kept out of action for most of the season through illness and even though he fully recovered and was riding again the following season, the lean spell continued to the point where "his past exploits would seem to have been almost forgotten" Eventually, Wheatley returned North, where he was once again a big fish in a small pond.

=== Trainer ===
Wheatley's next career step took him to Egypt where he spent most of the remainder of his life. In 1933, retired from racing, he was appointed principal trainer to King Fuad. He remained in Egypt until his wife's death in 1951, whereupon he returned home to Ilkeston. He died there in October 1951.

== Personal life ==
Wheatley married twice. His first wife died in the summer of 1912 and shortly after he married actress Maudie Wood, sister of music hall star Marie Lloyd, in Brixton, London.

== Major wins ==
(United Kingdom) Great Britain

- St. Leger – Night Hawk (1913)

== Career record ==
- 1905 – 125
- 1906 – not known
- 1907 – 44
- 1908 – 25
- 1909 – 27
- 1910 – 41
- 1911 – 17
- 1912 – 73
- 1913 – 79
- 1914 – 45
- 1915 onwards – not known
