= Beadsman (horse) =

British-bred Thoroughbred racehorse

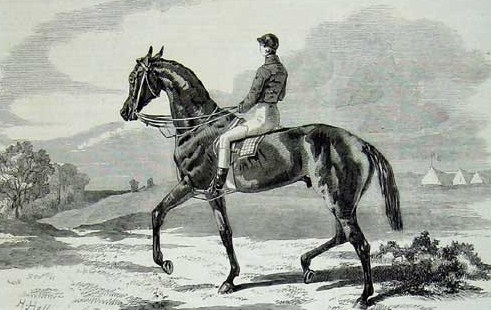
- Beadsman. From the Illustrated London News, 1858
- Sire: Weatherbit
- Grandsire: Sheet Anchor
- Dam: Mendicant
- Damsire: Touchstone
- Sex: Stallion
- Foaled: 1855
- Country: United Kingdom of Great Britain and Ireland
- Colour: Brown
- Breeder: Sir Joseph Hawley
- Owner: Sir Joseph Hawley
- Trainer: George Manning
- Record: 7: 5-0-2

Major wins
- Newmarket Stakes (1858); Epsom Derby (1858)

Beadsman (1855–1872) was a British Thoroughbred racehorse and sire. In a career that lasted from July 1857 to June 1858, he ran seven times and won five races. He was unbeaten as a three-year-old and recorded his most important success in the 1858 Epsom Derby. He was retired to stud at the end of the season and became a successful stallion, siring the winners of several important races.

== Background ==
Beadsman was a "blood-like, wiry-looking, but rather leggy" horse with a dark brown coat standing 15.2½ hands high. He was bred by his owner Sir Joseph Hawley. Beadsman was sent into training with George Manning, at his stable at Cannons Heath, near Kingsclere in Hampshire, although decisions regarding his racing career were all made by Hawley. Manning's stable was converted barn and was not noted for its hygiene: a stagnant pond "where frogs and beetles revel" stood close by the entrance and was blamed for causing outbreaks of fever and "malaria" among the inmates.

Beadsman’s sire, Weatherbit, was runner-up in the 1845 Goodwood Cup before going on to a successful stud career. His dam, Mendicant, was a "very superior racemare", winning the 1000 Guineas and The Oaks in 1846 before she was bought by Hawley in 1847.

== Racing career ==
=== 1857: two-year-old season ===
Beadsman was not highly tested as a two-year-old. He ran twice at Goodwood, and although he failed to win, he showed some promise. On 28 July in the £100 Ham Stakes he dead-heated for third place behind the filly Blanche of Middlebie. Two days later, on Goodwood Cup day, he finished third to the easy winner Toxophilite in a £200 Sweepstakes.

=== 1858: three-year-old season ===
Beadsman began his three-year-old season by beating Star of the East by a neck in a race at Newmarket in early April. He returned to the same course two weeks later for the second spring meeting and won twice. On 21 April he beat an unnamed colt by Collingwood out of Sneer to win a £100 Sweepstakes. Two days later he was moved up in class to establish himself as a Derby contender in the Newmarket Stakes. He made most of the running and after what Bell's Life described "one of the finest races ever seen" finished in a dead-heat with Eclipse (by Orlando). Beadsman’s stable had another Derby contender in the 2000 Guineas winner Fitz-Roland and opinion concerning the colts’ relative merits was divided. Manning felt that Fitz-Roland was better, but Hawley favoured Beadsman and the stable jockey John Wells, was undecided. Later stories claim that Hawley did everything he could to express public confidence in Fitz-Roland, causing Beadsman to be ignored and his odds for the Derby to lengthen.

At Epsom on 19 May, Beadsman was ridden by Wells and started at odds of 10/1 in a field of twenty-three runners. Toxophilite, owned by the Prime Minister Lord Derby started favourite for the race which took place on an unusually hot day and attracted the customary huge crowd. Beadsman was settled just behind the leaders and turned into the straight in fourth place behind Fitz-Roland, Toxophilite and Eclipse. Fitz-Roland soon weakened and Toxophilite looked the likely winner until Wells produced Beadsman with a challenge inside the last quarter mile. Beadsman took the lead inside the final furlong and won comfortably by a length from Toxophilite with The Hadji staying on strongly for third. Many of the jockeys lost weight during the race and when Wells was checked afterwards he was found to be slightly below his registered weight. He had to add Beadsman’s bridle to the judge’s scales before he could pass the weigh-in.

In his only race after the Derby, Beadsman won a Triennial Stakes at Stockbridge Racecourse. He was entered for at least three match races in the autumn, including one against the Cesarewitch winner Prioress, but none of these happened as either Hawley or the owner of Beadsman’s rival withdrew and paid a forfeit.

== Assessment ==
Beadsman was generally regarded as the best horse in a mediocre year for three-year-olds.

== Stud career ==
Beadsman was retired to his owner’s stud at Leybourne Grange in Kent, where he remained for the rest of his life apart from a period around 1866 when he stood at Middlethorpe in Yorkshire. Beadsman proved to be a successful stallion. He sired the Derby winner Blue Gown and the St Leger winner Pero Gomez among other good winners. He died after a "short but severe" illness on 5 July 1872.

== Sire line tree ==
- Beadsman
  - The Palmer
    - Confessor
    - Grey Palmer
    - Huntly
    - Forerunner
    - Kings Lynn
    - Richelieu
    - St Oswald
    - Ventnor
    - Pelligrino
      - Nasr-Ed-Din
    - Warrenby
    - Precursor
    - Palmbearer
    - Dominic
    - Palmy
      - Fatal
        - Alanes
      - Almendro
    - Valerius
  - Blue Gown
    - Zutzen
      - Tormentor
  - Rosicrucian
    - Chevron
      - Offenheit
        - Offenbach
    - Beauclerc
      - Chislehurst
        - Macdonald
      - Beauchamp
      - Luminary
      - Selby
      - Tyrant
        - Masque
      - Clwyd
    - Rossifer
    - Zanoni
      - Mariscal
      - Amianto
        - Malgarejo
    - Alchemist
    - Ercildoune
      - Masseur
      - Magus
        - Inlander
        - Wagram
        - Magnat
    - Althotas
    - Laureate
      - Chuctanunda
    - Glyndon
    - Rosy Morn
    - Zorilla
    - Jacobite
    - Rose Window
    - Dalberg
      - Rondinelli
  - Pero Gomez
    - Hidaldo
    - Peregrine
    - Sir Charles
    - Siddartha
    - Pontiac
      - Ramapo
      - Chickasaw
    - Perizonius
    - The Maroon
  - Alvarez
  - Bethnal Green
    - Bolton Green
    - Fryingpan
      - Fortunatus
  - Saxon
    - Gerald
  - Coeruleus
    - True Blue
    - Blue-Green
    - Odin
  - Vasco Di Gama
  - Jolly Friar

== Pedigree ==
Pedigree of Beadsman (GB), brown stallion, 1855
| Sire Weatherbit (GB) 1842 | Sheet Anchor; 1832 | Lottery | Tramp* |
| Sire Weatherbit (GB) 1842 | Sheet Anchor; 1832 | Lottery | Mandane |
| Sire Weatherbit (GB) 1842 | Sheet Anchor; 1832 | Morgiana | Muley |
| Sire Weatherbit (GB) 1842 | Sheet Anchor; 1832 | Morgiana | Miss Stephenson |
| Sire Weatherbit (GB) 1842 | Miss Letty; 1834 | Priam | Emilius |
| Sire Weatherbit (GB) 1842 | Miss Letty; 1834 | Priam | Cressida |
| Sire Weatherbit (GB) 1842 | Miss Letty; 1834 | Orville mare | Orville |
| Sire Weatherbit (GB) 1842 | Miss Letty; 1834 | Orville mare | Buzzard mare |
| Dam Mendicant (GB) 1843 | Touchstone; 1831 | Camel | Whalebone |
| Dam Mendicant (GB) 1843 | Touchstone; 1831 | Camel | Selim mare |
| Dam Mendicant (GB) 1843 | Touchstone; 1831 | Banter | Master Henry |
| Dam Mendicant (GB) 1843 | Touchstone; 1831 | Banter | Boadicea |
| Dam Mendicant (GB) 1843 | Lady Moore Carew; 1830 | Tramp* | Dick Andrews |
| Dam Mendicant (GB) 1843 | Lady Moore Carew; 1830 | Tramp* | Gohanna mare |
| Dam Mendicant (GB) 1843 | Lady Moore Carew; 1830 | Kite | Bustard |
| Dam Mendicant (GB) 1843 | Lady Moore Carew; 1830 | Kite | Olympia (Family: 13) |

* Beadsman is inbred 4S x 3D to the stallion Tramp, meaning that he appears fourth generation on the sire side of his pedigree and third generation on the dam side of his pedigree.
