= Paul Hanagan =

English jockey (born 1980)

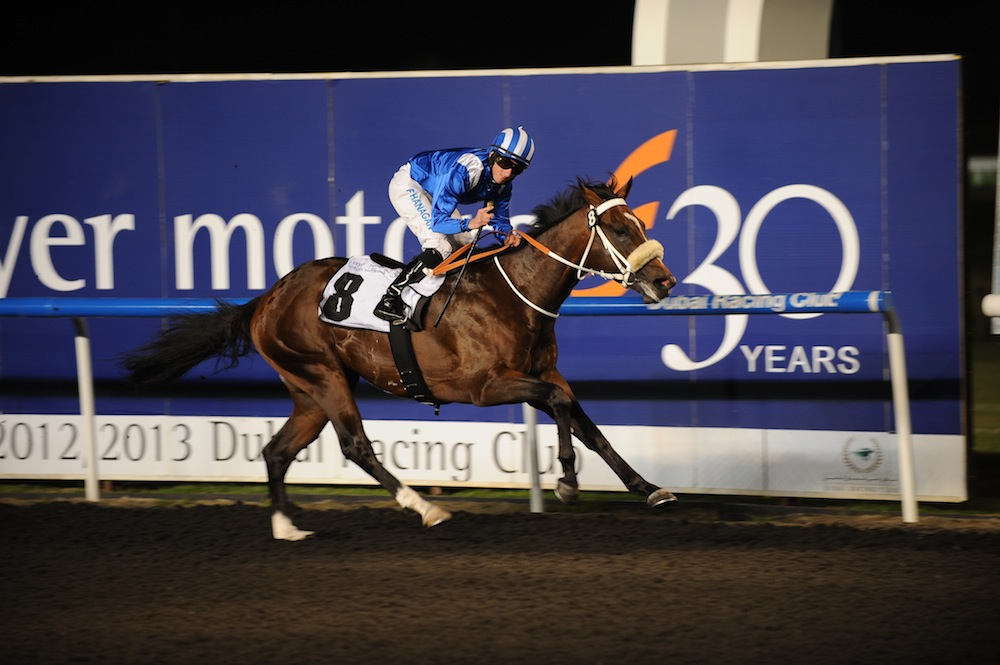
- Paul Hanagan winning UAE 2,000 Guineas on Soft Falling Rain

Personal information
- Born: 8 September 1980 (age 45) Warrington, Cheshire
- Occupation: Jockey

Horse racing career
- Sport: Horse racing

Major racing wins
- British Classic Race wins: Epsom Oaks (1)

Racing awards
- British flat racing Champion Jockey 2010, 2011

Significant horses
- Mayson, Soft Falling Rain, Wootton Bassett, Taghrooda

Paul Hanagan (born 8 September 1980 in Warrington, Cheshire) is a Classic-winning British flat racing jockey. Hanagan was twice been crowned champion jockey on the flat in Britain, riding 165 winners in 2011 to defend his title, having won his first title with 191 winners in 2010. Over a career spanning 25 years, he won a total of ten Group 1 races including the Epsom Oaks. From 1999 to 2022 he rode for the Malton-based trainer Richard Fahey, except for a four-and-a-half year break when he was retained by owner Sheikh Hamdan. He announced his retirement from race riding in August 2023.

== Childhood and early career ==
A graduate of the British Racing School, Hanagan sat on a horse for the first time aged 14, having previously harboured ambitions of playing football professionally, only to be told he was too small and light. His introduction to horse racing came through his father, Geoff, who had hoped to be a jockey and, having failed to make the grade in Newmarket, later rode out on weekends for local Warrington-based trainer Terry Caldwell. In a BBC interview in 2003, Hanagan recalls the moment he realised he wanted to be a jockey:

"My dad used to ride out at Terry Caldwell's yard and I followed him down one weekend…that was how it all started. Straight away I thought this is something totally different…I thought: 'This is what I want to do'. I was still only about 11, but it was kind of like a bug."

Hanagan went on to help out at Caldwell's yard in Warrington riding out for the first time aged 14 and continuing his work experience there until leaving school to start a 9-week course at the British Racing School in 1997.

Hanagan's first job in racing came with the Norton-based trainer Malcolm Jefferson, who despite being better known as a trainer of National Hunt horses, gave Hanagan his first racecourse ride on Stone Beck at Haydock Park on 4 September 1998, finishing 4th.

A year later and on the recommendation from Jefferson that he should join a flat yard, Hanagan joined the growing yard of trainer Richard Fahey at Malton as an apprentice jockey.

== Champion apprentice ==
Four years into a rapid growing career that had seen Hanagan register scores of 6, 23, and 29 in 1999, 2000 and 2001 respectively, Hanagan became British flat racing Champion Apprentice in 2002, recording a tally of 81 winners, the second-highest total for a champion apprentice in the post-war era behind Lee Newman, the 2000 champion with 87 winners.

In an interview after winning the apprentice championship, Hanagan was quick to praise his boss Fahey:

"The title was my aim at the start of the year…I’m very grateful for all the help and support I’ve received from everyone, especially from Richard Fahey. Without him, I wouldn’t be where I am today."

The 2002 season also saw Hanagan record the biggest win of his career at the time on Vintage Premium in the John Smith's Cup at York, leading trainer Fahey to comment "If this boy is not champion jockey one day I will give up the game."

== Maiden century ==
In 2004, Hanagan recorded his maiden century of winners, which had been one of his career ambitions when setting out as a young apprentice. His wins that year included victory in the historic Northumberland Plate at Newcastle on Mirjan, which came as a massive boost to Hanagan, who days earlier had incurred a 28-day ban at the Jockey Club for repeatedly not riding to his draw in races. 2004 represented another milestone for Hanagan, as he broke through the £1 million barrier for the first time.

== Champion jockey ==
Though his main patron Fahey had predicted big things for Paul Hanagan following his champion apprentice title in 2002, the challenge of becoming champion jockey for a northern-based jockey was a significant one, with just two other northern-based riders picking up the title in over a century (Elijah Wheatley in 1905 and Kevin Darley in 2000). However, benefiting from the increasing strength of the Fahey stable, Hanagan started the 2010 campaign with four winners on the opening day and was never headed in the race to the title, finishing with 191 winners from over 1,100 rides. In an interview with the Daily Telegraph shortly after being crowned champion jockey on 6 November 2010, Hanagan, who had been cheered on his return to the weighing room by both his colleagues and members of the public, said: "I owe the boss [Richard Fahey] so much, I've been with him for 14 years and I owe him a lot. It sounds great being champion jockey, I think it will take a while to sink in."

Hanagan's Championship season was enhanced by the top-class two-year-old Wootton Bassett, who finished the season unbeaten in five starts, the last four of those under Hanagan. These victories included major sales races at York and Doncaster, but most importantly a win in the Group 1 Prix Jean-Luc Lagardère at Longchamp, providing Hanagan with the first top-level success of his career. Though Wootton Bassett was unable to add to those successes at three and was retired to stud at the end of the 2011 campaign, he had played an important part in Hanagan's career.

A year after defeating Richard Hughes in the 2010 flat jockeys championship, Hanagan was successful in his defence of the title, beating the Brazilian jockey Silvestre De Sousa in a title race that once again went down to the very last day of the season. Hanagan finished the season with 165 winners, 4 clear of De Sousa, and described the feeling of retaining the title as "a big relief". However, after winning two titles in a row, Hanagan hinted in a Channel 4 interview that he would not be challenging for the title in 2012, claiming "I've got to take a step back. I can't keep going on like this or I won't last long."

Hanagan became the first northern-based jockey to win the flat championship more than once, and having initially suggested he would not go all out for a third title in a row in 2012, he suggested in late November 2011 that, while he wanted to focus on riding a better quality of horse, he may try to retain the championship, saying "If I can recharge the batteries and have a good rest then I might think 'well I might give it a good go... I say [I won't go for it again] every time but they ask you the question straight after you get off the horse – it's the worst possible time to ask."

== Later career ==
Hanagan's hopes of a third title did not materialise, and he finished fifth in the jockeys' championships of both 2012 and 2013, dropping out of the top 5 in 2014. In 2012 he became the retained jockey for owner Sheikh Hamdan, whose filly Taghrooda, trained by John Gosden, provided Hanagan with his first and only Classic win in the Oaks in 2014. The partnership went on to further Group 1 success that season in the King George VI and Queen Elizabeth Stakes at Ascot. Hanagan rode a total of seven Group 1 wins for Sheikh Hamdan before they parted company in 2016 and he returned to Fahey. The trainer and jockey had a Group 1 success with Sands Of Mali in the British Champions Sprint Stakes at Ascot in 2018.

Hanagan suffered fractures to his vertebrae in a fall at Newcastle in February 2020 but returned to riding later in the year and rode his 2000th winner in Britain at the same course in November 2020. In 2021 and 2022 Hanagan and Fahey won back-to-back victories in the Group 2 Norfolk Stakes at Royal Ascot with Perfect Power and, after having ended their formal association, The Ridler.

On 25 August 2023, Hanagan announced that he was retiring from race riding, with his final ride being at the Ebor Festival two days later.

== Personal life ==
Hanagan is married to Anna and the couple have two sons.

== Major wins ==
(United Kingdom) Great Britain

- British Champions Sprint Stakes – (2) – Muhaarar (2015), Sands of Mali (2018)
- Eclipse Stakes – (1) – Mukhadram (2014)
- July Cup – (2) – Mayson (2011), Muhaarar (2015)
- King George VI and Queen Elizabeth Stakes – (1) – Taghrooda (2014)
- Oaks Stakes – (1) – Taghrooda (2014)

France

- Prix Jean-Luc Lagardère – (1) – Wootton Bassett (2010)
- Prix Maurice de Gheest – (1) – Muhaarar (2015)

(United Arab Emirates) UAE

- Dubai Golden Shaheen – (1) Muarrab (2016)

Sporting positions
Preceded by Richard Hills	Hamdan Al Maktoum retained jockey 2012–2016	Succeeded by Jim Crowley
