= Guineas Meeting =

British flat racing event

The Guineas Meeting is the British flat racing event that takes place at Newmarket Racecourse at the beginning of May each year. It includes two British Classic Races:

- The 1,000 Guineas, a mile race for three year old fillies
- The 2,000 Guineas, a mile race for three year old colts and fillies
