= George Fordham =

British jockey (1837–1887)

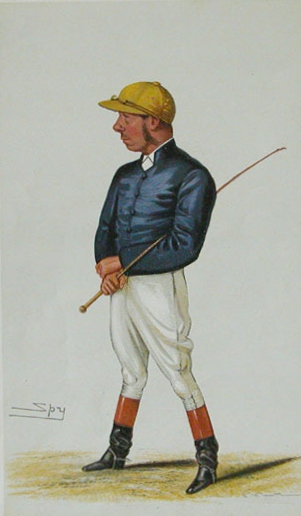
- Caricature by Spy published in Vanity Fair in 1882

Personal information
- Born: 21 September 1837 Newmarket
- Died: 13 October 1887 (aged 50) Slough
- Occupation: Jockey

Horse racing career
- Sport: Horse racing

Major racing wins
- Major race wins: 1,000 Guineas Stakes (1859, 1861, 1865, 1868, 1869, 1881, 1883); 2,000 Guineas Stakes (1867, 1868 [dead heat], 1880); Oaks Stakes (1859, 1868, 1870, 1872, 1881); Derby Stakes (1879); Ascot Gold Cup (1867, 1871, 1872, 1875, 1883); Goodwood Cup (1855, 1856, 1861, 1866, 1883); Champion Stakes (1882 [dead heat]); Sussex Stakes (1882); Middle Park Stakes (1879, 1880)

Significant horses
- Doncaster, Formosa, Sir Bevys, Summerside

George Fordham (1837–1887) was a British flat racing jockey. He was Champion Jockey every year between 1855 and 1863, as well as four other occasions in his own right and once as joint champion. He then won the Derby in 1879, won the Oaks five times, and the Grand Prix de Paris three times. His career high was 165 wins in 1862. He was described in 1910 as "one of the greatest jockeys of all-time".

== Background ==
Fordham was born in Cambridge on 24 September 1837, the son of James Fordham. His uncle was travelling head lad to Richard Drewitt in Middleham, North Yorkshire and it was here he became an apprentice. He was trained by Drewitt and Edward Smith, and at the age of thirteen had his first ride at Brighton after Drewitt moved to Lewes, Sussex.

== Riding career ==
George's first mount may have been on Cora [3yrs 5st 1lb] at Epsom [badly away and unplaced] on Tuesday 5 November 1850 for Mr Douglas.

In October 1851 he gained his first victory in the Trial Stakes at the Brighton autumn meeting. He won the Cambridgeshire in 1853 on Little David, for which he received a bible and a gold-mounted whip, and in the following year unexpectedly won the Chester Cup on Epaminondas. From this time Fordham became a very popular rider. In 1855, he was at the head of the list of winning jockeys with 70 winners, and during eight succeeding years he occupied the same position, his best record being 165 wins in 1862. In 1859 he won his first important race, the 1,000 Guineas on Mayonaise. The same year he won the Oaks on Summerside.

Fordham won the Ascot Cup five times, the Alexandra Plate once, the Gold Vase six times, the Ascot Stakes twice, and the Prince of Wales's Stakes four times. He rode several favourites for the Derby, but only won it in 1879 upon Sir Bevys. Fordham had, in all, twenty-two mounts for the Derby, his last appearance in the race being in 1883, when he was unplaced on Ladislas. He never won the St. Leger, though he rode twenty-two races. He won the Oaks five times. For the 2,000 Guineas, Fordham also had twenty-two mounts, but only won twice. He secured the 1,000 Guineas seven times out of twenty-one mounts. Many of Fordham's best efforts were in small races, when he frequently succeeded against expectation by his singular skill and resolution. His greatest achievement is said to have been in 1871, when he won the Cambridgeshire on Sabinus. His only Cesarewitch victory was in 1857, when the famous dead heat occurred between three.

Fordham was a great favourite on the continent, and especially in France, where he frequently rode. He won the Grand Prix de Paris in 1867, 1868, and 1881, the French Derby in 1861 and 1868, and the French Oaks in 1880. He had no superior as a rider of two-year-olds. His weight was only 3 st 12 lb when he won his first Cambridgeshire. His services were much in request from a very early period and one owner presented him with a Bible, a testimonial pin, and a gold-mounted whip, all of which he preserved through life, religiously following the motto engraved upon the whip of 'Honesty is the best policy.' He also received souvenirs from the Rothschilds, the Prince of Wales, and other patrons of the turf. He was frequently offered £1,500 a year to ride in England and France, but he would never agree to receive a fixed salary.

During the latter part of his career failing health frequently kept him out of the saddle. Between 1875 and 1878 he was not seen in public. His last win was in Leopold de Rothschild's colours on Brag in the Brighton Cup of 1883, and his last race the Park Stakes at Windsor in August 1884. He carried the most implicit confidence of all his employers, and was kind to young jockeys. It was said that he never attempted to take advantage of a youngster at the start.

== Personal life ==
Fordham was twice married: first to Miss Penelope Amelia Hyde of Lewes, who was the niece of the trainer Richard Drewitt. She died in early 1879 in the Isle of Wight, aged 40. His second marriage was to Lydia Selth in the last quarter of 1879. She survived him, dying in the Brighton area at the end of 1918 aged 74.

After the loss of his first wife he went to reside at West Brighton, where an accident in riding produced a concussion of the brain. He was in a serious condition for weeks. At the close of 1884 Fordham left Brighton and returned to Slough, where he had previously lived, and he died there 13 October 1887.

Fordham was devoted to his family. He was never known to give a vote for a parliamentary candidate in his life. He was extremely reticent on horse-racing, had a deep aversion to gambling of all kinds, and was anxious to keep his son from following him into a career on the turf. His own career was scrupulously honourable. He did, however, perform somewhat below his best on one occasion. Riding for Sir John Astley at Lewes, he was beaten a head in a close finish by a horse belonging to Mrs Drewitt the widow of his old master. Afterwards, he confessed to Sir John, "Well, you know, Mrs Drewitt has not been able to pay her rent, and all through the race I could not help thinking of that damned rent, and, you know, I ought just to have won'.

He left an estate of £19,903 on his death.

== Bibliography ==
- Mortimer, Roger; Onslow, Richard; Willett, Peter (1978). Biographical Encyclopaedia of British Racing. London: Macdonald and Jane's. ISBN 0-354-08536-0.
- Tanner, Michael (2017). The Demon: The Life of George Fordham. Bloomington, Indiana, USA: AuthorHouse. ISBN 9781524680114.
- Tanner, Michael; Cranham, Gerry (1992). Great Jockeys of the Flat. Enfield, Middlesex: Guinness Publishing. ISBN 0-85112-989-7.
