= List of racehorses =

This list includes racehorses that exist in the historical record.

== Racehorses ==
For competition horses, such as show jumpers and dressage horses, see List of historical horses § Competition horses.

=== A ===
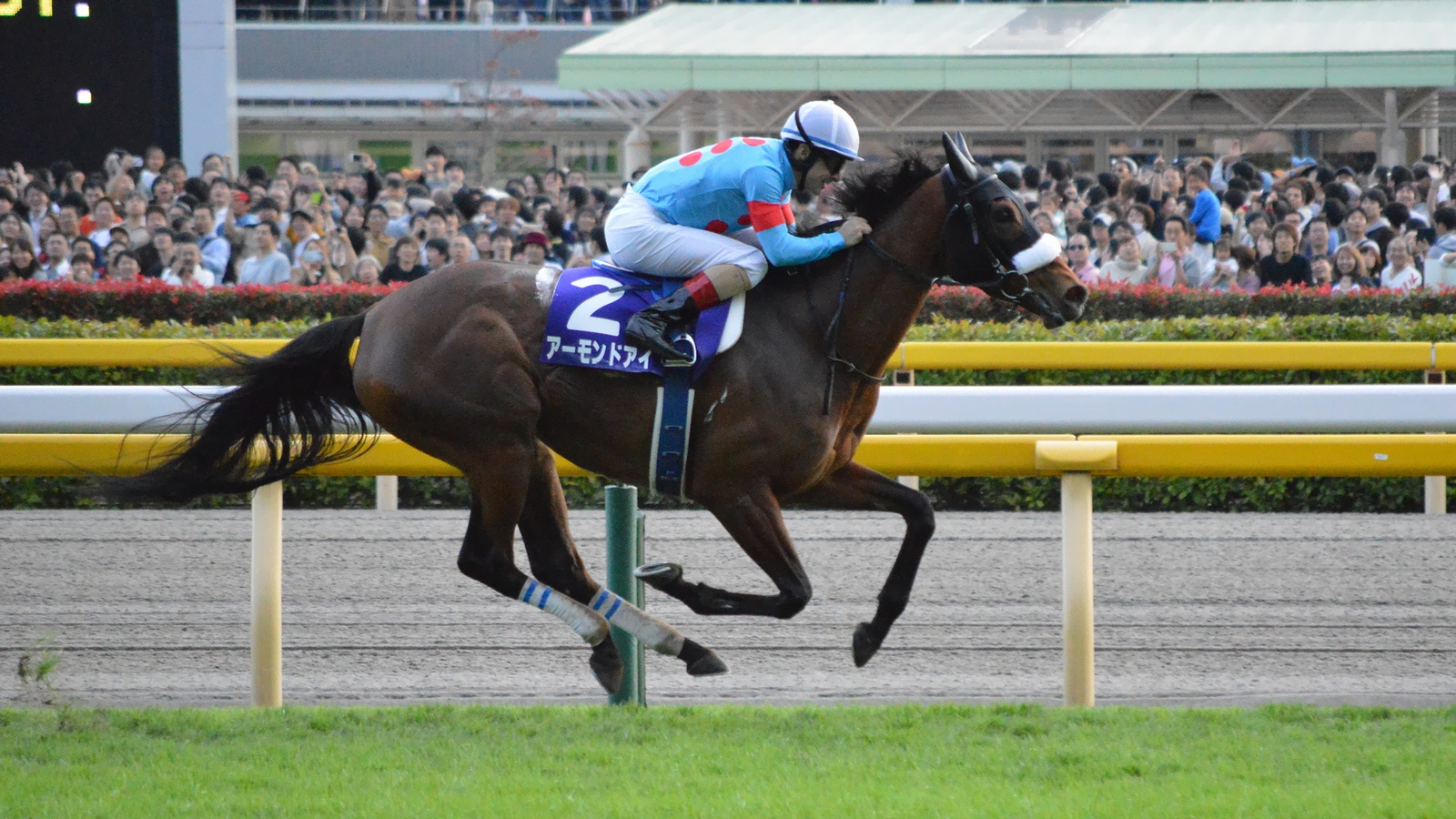
Almond Eye

- A.P. Indy: 1992 Santa Anita Derby, Belmont Stakes, and Breeders' Cup Classic winner, major breeding sire after racing
- Aboyeur: 1913 Epsom Derby winner
- Accelerate: 2018 Breeders' Cup Classic winner
- Ace Impact: Undefeated winner of the 2023 Prix de l'Arc de Triomphe
- Achievement: 1867 1000 Guineas Stakes, Coronation Stakes, and St Leger Stakes winner
- Ack Ack: 1971 American Horse of the Year
- Action This Day: 2003 Breeders' Cup Juvenile winner
- Adam's Apple: 1927 2000 Guineas Stakes winner
- Adayar: 2021 Epsom Derby and King George VI and Queen Elizabeth Stakes winner
- Adios Butler: Famous harness racer
- Admiral's Voyage: American multiple-stakes winner
- Admire Groove: Winner of the 2003 and 2004 Queen Elizabeth II Commemorative Cup
- Admire Moon: 2007 Japanese Horse of the Year, known for winning that year's Dubai Duty Free Stakes, Takarazuka Kinen and Japan Cup
- Admire Vega: Winner of the 1999 Japanese Derby
- Affectionately: 1962 American Champion Two-Year-Old Filly and 1965 American Champion Sprint Horse. Dam of 1970 co-American Horse of the Year Personality.
- Affirmed: U.S. Triple Crown winner (1978)
- Afleet Again: 2011 Breeders' Cup Marathon winner
- Afleet Alex: 2005 Preakness Stakes and Belmont Stakes winner, American champion 3-year-old of 2005
- Africander: 1903 Belmont Stakes winner and American Champion 3-year-old
- Agile: 1905 Kentucky Derby winner
- Agnes Digital: American-born Japanese racehorse known for winning the 2001 Tennō Shō (Autumn), the 2001 Hong Kong Cup, and the 2003 Yasuda Kinen, as well as his ability to run on dirt surfaces just as well as turf
- Agnes Flight: 2000 Tōkyō Yūshun winner
- Agnes Flora: 1990 Oka Sho winner. Dam of both Agnes Flight and Agnes Tachyon
- Agnes Tachyon: Undefeated 2001 Satsuki Sho winner, sire of Daiwa Scarlet
- Aimwell: 1785 Epsom Derby winner
- Air Groove: Winner of the 1996 Yushun Himba, 1997 Tennō Shō (Autumn), and 1998 Ōsaka Hai
- Air Jihad: Won both the Yasuda Kinen and Mile Championship in the same year (1999)
- Air Messiah: Winner of the 2005 Shūka Shō
- Air Shakur: Winner of the 2000 Satsuki Sho and Kikuka Sho
- Airborne: 1946 Epsom Derby and St. Leger Stakes winner
- Ajax: 18 consecutive race wins, before he was defeated at 1/40
- Ajina: 1997 Breeders' cup Distaff winner and American champion 3-year-old filly
- Alan-a-Dale: 1902 Kentucky Derby winner
- Albatross: Harness racer who won 59 of 71 races, and as a sire produced winners of over $130 million, including Niatross
- Alcide: 1958 St Leger Stakes and King George VI and Queen Elizabeth Stakes winner
- Algerine: 1876 Belmont Stakes winner
- Allabaculia: Winner of the inaugural St Leger Stakes in 1776
- Allez France: French Arc winner and first filly to win a million dollars
- Almahmoud: Influential broodmare, dam of Natalma and Cosmah
- Almond Eye: Won 9 G1 races, setting a new record in Japan, including all three of the Japanese Fillies' Triple Crown in 2018 and the Japan Cup twice (2018, 2020)
- Aloma's Ruler: 1982 Preakness Stakes winner
- Alphabet Soup: 1996 Breeders' Cup Classic winner
- Alsab: 1942 Preakness Stakes winner, American champion 2-year-old and 3-year-old, ranked in Top 100 American racehorses of the 20th Century
- Altisidora: 1813 St Leger Stakes winner
- Always Dreaming: 2017 Kentucky Derby winner
- Alydar: Finished second to Affirmed in all three 1978 Triple Crown races; successful sire
- Alysheba: 1987 Kentucky Derby and Preakness Stakes winner, 1988 Breeders' Cup Classic winner
- Amato: 1838 Epsom Derby winner, won in his only race
- Amberoid: 1966 Belmont Stakes winner
- Ambidexter: 1790 St Leger Stakes winner
- Ambrosio: 1796 St Leger Stakes winner
- American Flag: 1925 Belmont Stakes winner and American Champion 3-year-old
- American Pharoah: 2015 winner of the U.S. Triple Crown and Breeders' Cup World Championships in Lexington, Kentucky at Keeneland Race Course
- Andover: 1854 Epsom Derby winner
- Anees: 1999 Breeders' Cup Juvenile winner
- Angel of Empire: 2023 Arkansas Derby winner
- Animal Kingdom: American Thoroughbred racehorse; won 137th Kentucky Derby and 2013 Dubai World Cup
- Answer Lively: 1998 Breeders' Cup Juvenile winner
- Anthony Van Dyck: 2019 Epsom Derby winner
- Antonio: 1819 St Leger Stakes winner
- Apapane: 2010 Japanese Fillies' Triple Crown and Victoria Mile winner
- Apollo: 1882 Kentucky Derby winner
- April the Fifth: 1932 Epsom Derby winner
- Arazi: American-bred French-bred horse that won the Prix Morny, Prix de la Salamandre, Grand Critérium, and Breeders' Cup Juvenile in 1991. European Horse of the Year for 1991
- Arcangelo: 2023 Belmont Stakes and Travers Stakes winner
- Arcangues: 1993 Prix d'Ispahan and Breeders' Cup Classic winner
- Archduke: 1799 Epsom Derby winner
- Archer: First and second winner of the Melbourne Cup
- Arctic Cosmos: 2010 St Leger Stakes winner
- Arctic Prince: 1951 Epsom Derby winner
- Ard Patrick: 1902 Epsom Derby winner. Also winner of Prince of Wales's Stakes and Eclipse Stakes, and later a leading sire in Germany
- Aristides: Winner of the first Kentucky Derby
- Arkle: Highest Timeform rating for a steeplechase horseracer
- Arrogate: Winner of Travers Stakes, Breeders' Cup Classic, Pegasus World Cup, and Dubai World Cup in track record time and the richest U.S.-based racehorse of all time
- Artax: 1999 Breeders' Cup Sprint winner, American champion sprint horse
- Artie Schiller: 2005 Breeders' Cup Mile winner
- Arts and Letters: 1969 Belmont Stakes winner and American Horse of the Year
- Ashado: 2004 Breeders' Cup Distaff winner, American champion 3-year-old filly in 2004 and champion older mare in 2005
- Ashton: 1809 St Leger Stakes winner
- Ask Victor More: 2022 Kikuka-shō winner
- Assassin: 1782 Epsom Derby winner
- Assault: U.S. Triple Crown winner (1946)
- Assignee: 1894 Preakness Stakes winner
- Aston Machan: 2007 Sprinters Stakes winner whose career was cut short at age four due to acute heart failure
- Athens Wood: 1971 St Leger Stakes winner
- Atlantic: 1874 2000 Guineas Stakes winner
- Attila: 1842 Epsom Derby winner
- Audarya: French-bred British-trained horse that won the Prix Jean Romanet and Breeders' Cup Filly & Mare Turf in 2020
- Auguste Rodin: Winner of both the Epsom and Irish Derbies of 2023, as well as the Breeders' Cup Turf of the same year
- Aurelius: 1961 St Leger Stakes winner
- Aureole: 1954 Coronation Cup and King George VI and Queen Elizabeth Stakes winner. Significant sire after racing
- Australia: Irish-bred horse that won the Epsom Derby and Irish Derby in 2014
- Authentic: 2020 Kentucky Derby and Breeders' Cup Classic winner, American Horse of the Year
- Authorized: 2007 Epsom Derby and International Stakes winner
- Avatar: 1975 Belmont Stakes winner
- Awesome Again: winner of the 1997 Queen's Plate, Travers Stakes & Super Derby, 1998 Whitney Handicap and Breeders' Cup Classic
- Awesome Feather: 2010 Breeders' Cup Juvenile Fillies winner
- Ayrshire: 1888 2000 Guineas Stakes and Epsom Derby winner
- Azeri: 2002 Breeders' Cup Distaff winner and American horse of the year. American champion older mare 2002–2004
- Azor: 1817 Epsom Derby winner
- Azra: 1892 Kentucky Derby and Travers Stakes winner

=== B ===
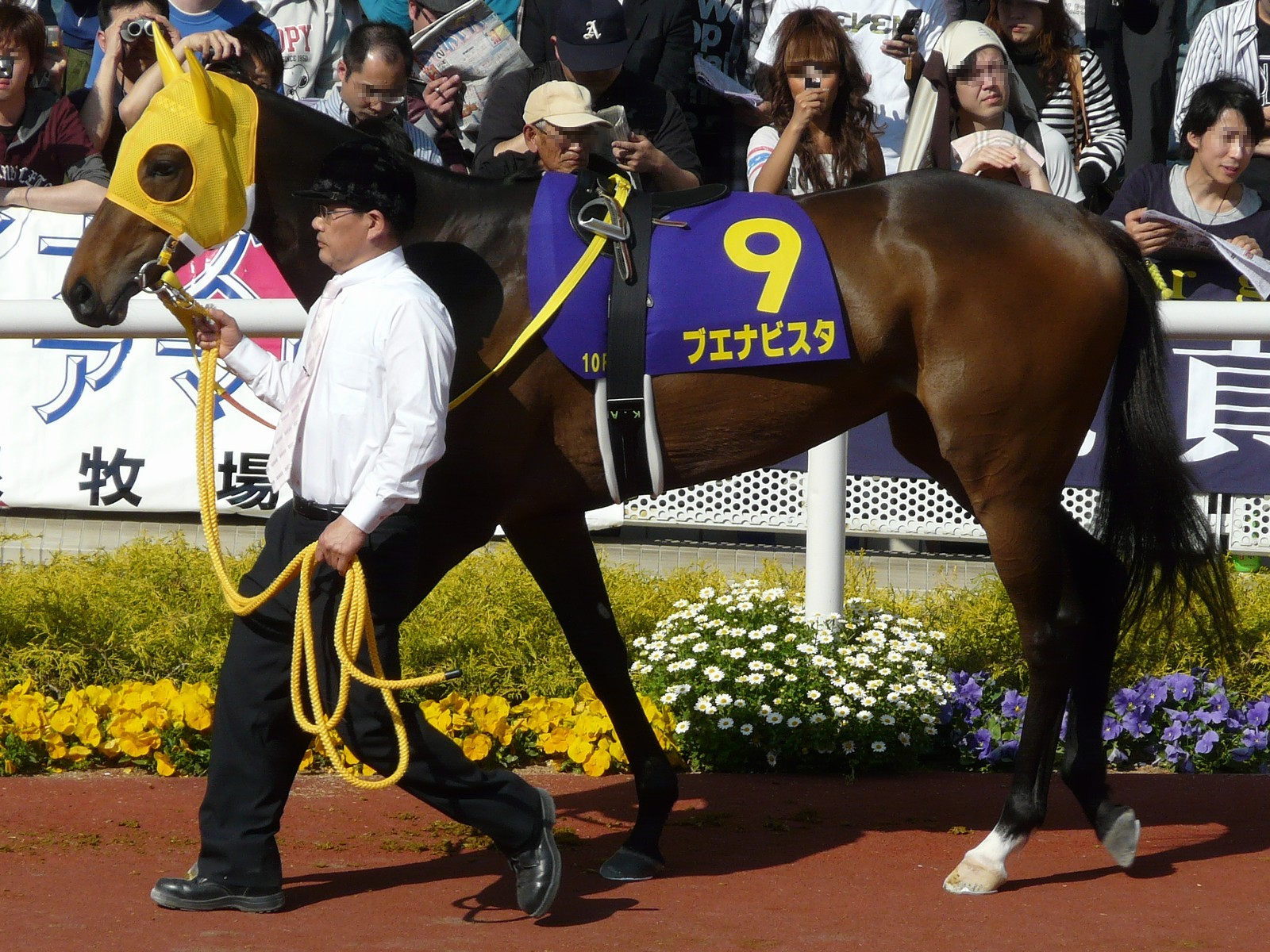
Buena Vista

- Baden-Baden: 1877 Kentucky Derby winner
- Bahram: Irish-bred British-trained horse that won the English Triple Crown in 1935
- Baldric: 1964 2000 Guineas Stakes and Champion Stakes winner
- Ballabriggs: National Hunt horse that won the 2011 Grand National
- Bally Ache: 1960 Preakness Stakes winner
- Ballymoss: 1957 Irish Derby and St Leger Stakes, and 1958 Prix de l'Arc de Triomphe winner.
- Banks Hill: British-bred French-trained horse that won the Coronation Stakes and Breeders' Cup Filly & Mare Turf in 2001 and the Prix Jacques Le Marois in 2002
- Barack Obama: Named after Barack Obama the 44th President of the United States, a New Zealand horse that competed in international endurance events.
- Barathea: Irish 2,000 Guineas winner in 1993 and Breeders' Cup Mile winner in 1994. European Horse of the Year in 1994
- Barbaro: American Thoroughbred who decisively won the 2006 Kentucky Derby, but shattered his leg two weeks later in the 2006 Preakness Stakes, ending his racing career; underwent several operations; eventually healed, but developed laminitis and could not be saved; euthanized January 29, 2007
- Barefoot: 1823 St Leger Stakes winner
- Basin: 2019 Hopeful Stakes winner
- Bast: Winner of the 2019 Del Mar Debutante Stakes, later a successful broodmare
- Batang Manda: Winner of the PCSO Presidential Gold Cup
- Battle of Midway: 2017 Breeders' Cup Dirt Mile winner
- Battleship (1927–1958): American thoroughbred racehorse who is the only horse to have won both the American Grand National and the Grand National steeplechase races.
- Bay Middleton: 1836 2000 Guineas Stakes and Epsom Derby winner. Two time leading sire in Britain and Ireland
- Bayakoa: Argentinian horse that won 13 Grade 1 stakes races, including the Breeders' Cup Distaff in 1989 and 1990; ranked a Top 100 American racehorse of the 20th Century
- Bayern: Winner of the 2014 Haskell Invitational Stakes and Breeders' Cup Classic
- Beadsman: 1858 Epsom Derby winner
- Beau Purple: One of the few horses to defeat Kelso
- Beautiful Pleasure: 1999 Breeders' Cup Distaff winner and American champion older mare
- Beauty Generation: New Zealand-bred horse that saw success in Hong Kong, winning the 2017 & 2018 Hong Kong Mile, 2018 and 2019 Champions Mile, 2018–2020 Queen's Silver Jubilee Cup, and 2019 Hong Kong Stewards' Cup. Hong Kong Horse of the Year in 2018 and 2019
- Bee Bee Bee: 1972 Preakness Stakes winner
- Behave Yourself: 1921 Kentucky Derby winner
- Beholder: Winner of the Breeders' Cup Juvenile Fillies, two-time winner of the Breeders' Cup Distaff, as well as the first filly to win the Pacific Classic
- Believe: Winner of the Sprinters Stakes in 2002 and the Takamatsunomiya Kinen in 2003, Japanese best older mare or filly for 2003
- Bellagio Opera: 2024 and 2025 Ōsaka Hai winner
- Belmar: 1895 Preakness Stakes and Belmont Stakes winner
- Ben Ali: 1886 Kentucky Derby winner
- Ben Brush: 1896 Kentucky Derby winner, American champion horse as a two-year-old and as an older-horse. Later a leading sire in North America
- Ben Nevis: Champion Maryland steeplechaser who won the Maryland Hunt Cup twice and the Grand National
- Bend Or: Very successful British Thoroughbred racehorse who won the 1880 Epsom Derby
- Beningbrough: 1794 St Leger Stakes winner
- Benny the Dip: 1997 Epsom Derby winner
- Bernardini: 2006 Preakness Stakes and Travers Stakes winner, later a major broodmare sire
- Bernborough: Australian racehorse and winner of 15 consecutive races at big weights; sold to US film producer Louis B. Mayer
- Best Mate: 2002, 2003 and 2004 Cheltenham Gold Cup winner; often given title 'Greatest Steeplechaser' since Arkle, and an equal to him
- Bet Twice: 1987 Belmont Stakes winner
- Better Talk Now: Five-time grade 1 stakes winner, including 2004 Breeders' Cup Turf
- Big Brown: 2008 Kentucky Derby and Preakness Stakes winner; first horse since Clyde Van Dusen to win the Kentucky Derby from the 20th post position
- Big Buck's: National Hunt horse that won the World Hurdle and Liverpool Hurdle four years in a row (2009–2012)
- Big Drama: 2010 Breeders' Cup Sprint winner, American champion sprint horse
- Big Game: 1942 2000 Guineas Stakes and Champion Stakes winner
- Biko Pegasus: Japanese horse that won multiple graded stakes
- Bimelech: 1940 Preakness Stakes and Belmont Stakes winner, American champion 2 and 3-year-old and ranked a Top 100 American racehorse of the 20th Century
- Birdstone: 2004 Belmont Stakes winner and successful sire
- Birmingham: 1830 St Leger Stakes winner
- Biwa Hayahide: Winner of the 1993 Kikuka-shō, 1994 Tennō Shō (Spring), and 1994 Takarazuka Kinen
- Black Caviar: Undefeated in 25 career starts; fifteen-time Group 1 winner
- Black Gold: 1924 Kentucky Derby winner, inspiration for the 1947 film Black Gold
- Black Hawk (Japan): British-bred Japanese-trained horse that won the Sprinters Stakes in 1999
- Black Jester: 1914 Sussex Stakes and St Leger Stakes winner
- Black Tarquin: 1948 St James's Palace Stakes and St Leger Stakes winner
- Black Tie Affair: 1991 Breeders' Cup Classic winner and American Horse of the Year
- Blair Athol: 1864 Epsom Derby and St Leger Stakes winner. Later a leading sire in Britain and Ireland in the 1870s
- Blakeney: 1969 Epsom Derby winner
- Blame: 2010 Breeders' Cup Classic winner
- Blink Bonny: 1857 Epsom Derby and Epsom Oaks winner, second filly to win the Derby
- Bloomsbury: 1839 Epsom Derby and Ascot Gold Cup winner
- Blucher: 1814 Epsom Derby winner
- Blue Gown: 1868 Epsom Derby and Ascot Gold Cup winner
- Blue Larkspur: 1929 Belmont Stakes winner, ranked a top-100 American horse of the 20th century
- Blue Man: 1952 Preakness Stakes winner
- Blue Peter (UK): British horse, winner of the Epsom Derby and 2000 Guineas Stakes in 1939. Later a leading broodmare sire in Britain and Ireland
- Blue Peter (US): American horse, winner of multiple graded stakes. American champion two-year-old for 1948
- Blue Prize: Argentinian horse that won the Breeders' Cup Distaff in 2019
- Blue Swords: Runner-up in 1943 Kentucky Derby and Preakness Stakes
- Bob's Return: 1993 St Leger Stakes winner
- Bobby's Kitten: 2014 Breeders' Cup Turf Sprint winner
- Bois Roussel: French horse that won the 1938 Epsom Derby. Later a successful broodmare sire in Britain and Ireland
- Bold: 1951 Preakness Stakes winner
- Bold Forbes: 1976 Kentucky Derby and Belmont Stakes winner
- Bold Reasoning: Known as the sire of Seattle Slew
- Bold Ruler: Leading sire of stakeswinners, best known for siring Secretariat; born in the same barn on the same night as Round Table
- Bold Venture: 1936 Kentucky Derby and Preakness Stakes winner
- Boldnesian: Santa Anita Derby winner, grandsire of American triple crown winner Seattle Slew
- Bolkonski: 1975 2000 Guineas Stakes and St James's Palace Stakes winner
- Bollin Eric: 2002 St Leger Stakes winner
- Bona Vista: 1892 2000 Guineas Stakes winner
- Bonnie Scotland: Runner up in the St. Leger Stakes, later a leading sire in North America in 1880 and 1882
- Book Law: 1927 Coronation Stakes, St Leger Stakes and Nassau Stakes winner
- Boston Harbor: 1996 Breeders' Cup Juvenile winner
- Bostonian: 1927 Preakness Stakes winner
- Boucher: 1972 St Leger Stakes winner
- Bounding Home: 1944 Belmont Stakes winner
- Bourbon: 1777 St Leger Stakes winner
- Bow Echo: 2026 2000 Guineas Stakes and St James's Palace Stakes winner
- Bowling Brook: 1898 Belmont Stakes winner
- Brave Raj: 1986 Breeders' Cup Juvenile Fillies winner and American champion 2-year-old filly
- Bret Hanover: One of only nine pacers to win the Triple Crown of Harness Racing for Pacers; had 62 wins from 69 starts; the only horse to be made Harness Horse of the Year three times
- Brian Boru: 2003 St Leger Stakes winner
- Brian's Time: American-trained racehorse with a successful stud career in Japan, sire of Japanese Triple Crown winner Narita Brian
- Bricks and Mortar: 2019 Breeders' Cup Turf winner and American Horse of the Year
- Brigadier Gerard: Winner of 17 of 18 races in England, including the 2000 Guineas and 11 other Group I races; joint third highest Timeform flat rating of all time
- British Idiom: 2019 Breeders' Cup Juvenile Fillies and American champion two-year-old filly
- Brocco: 1993 Breeders' Cup Juvenile and 1994 Santa Anita Derby winner
- Brokers Tip: 1933 Kentucky Derby winner, only race horse whose sole win was the Kentucky Derby
- Broomspun: 1921 Preakness Stakes winner
- Bruni: 1975 St Leger Stakes winner
- Bryn Mawr: 1904 Preakness Stakes winner
- Bubbling Over: 1926 Kentucky Derby winner
- Buchanan: 1884 Kentucky Derby winner
- Buck's Boy: 1998 Breeders' Cup Turf winner and American champion male turf horse
- Buckpasser: Won 15 consecutive races; one of the great broodmare sires
- Buddhist: 1889 Preakness Stakes winner
- Buena Vista: Won 6 Grade I races, including two of the Japanese Triple Tiara in 2009; 2010 Japanese Horse of the Year
- Burgomaster: 1906 Belmont Stakes winner
- Burgoo King: 1932 Kentucky Derby and Preakness Stakes winner
- Burlington: 1890 Belmont Stakes winner
- Burnham Square: 2025 Blue Grass Stakes winner
- Buskin: 1913 Preakness Stakes winner
- Bustino: 1974 St Leger Stakes and 1975 Coronation Cup winner. Later a successful sire, and a leading broodmare sire in Britain and Ireland
- Byzantine Dream: Active Japanese racehorse and 2025 Prix Foy winner; came second in the 2025 Tennō Shō (Spring) to Redentor

=== C ===
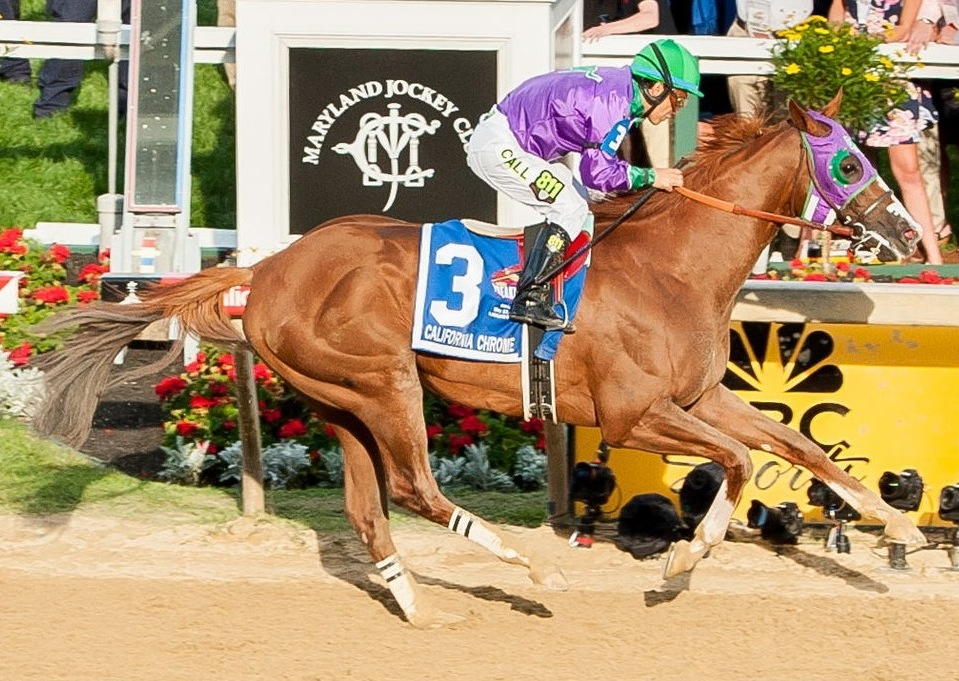
California Chrome

- Cadland: Winner of the 2000 Guineas Stakes and the Epsom Derby in 1828
- Cairngorm: 1905 Preakness Stakes winner
- Cajun Beat: 2003 Breeders' Cup Sprint winner
- Calandagan: Irish-bred racehorse with notable Grade 1 wins across several countries, including a 2025 Japan Cup win that set a world record for 2400 meters on turf
- Caleb's Posse: 2011 Breeders' Cup Dirt Mile winner
- Calidoscopio: Argentinian horse that won the Breeders' Cup Marathon in 2012
- California Chrome: Won the 140th Kentucky Derby; won the Preakness; won the 2016 Dubai World Cup; two-time American Horse of the Year
- California Flag: 2009 Breeders' Cup Turf Sprint winner
- Caligula: 1920 St Leger Stakes winner
- Call Boy: 1927 Epsom Derby winner
- Calstone Light O: 2004 Sprinters Stakes winner
- Calvin: 1875 Belmont Stakes winner
- Cambremer: 1956 St Leger Stakes and 1957 Prix du Cadran winner
- Camelot: Winner of the 2000 Guineas Stakes, Epsom Derby, and Irish Derby in 2012
- Cameronian: Winner of the 2000 Guineas Stakes and Epsom Derby in 1931
- Candy Spots: 1963 Preakness Stakes winner
- Cannonade: 1974 Kentucky Derby winner
- Cañonero II: Venezuelan horse that won the 1971 Kentucky Derby and Preakness Stakes
- Cantelo: 1959 St Leger Stakes winner
- Capot: 1949 Preakness Stakes and Belmont Stakes winner, American Horse of the Year
- Capote: 1986 Breeders' Cup Juvenile winner
- Capri: 2017 Irish Derby and St Leger Stakes winner
- Captain Cuttle: 1922 Epsom Derby winner
- Captain Steve: 2001 Dubai World Cup winner
- Cara Rafaela: Grade 1 Alcibiades Stakes winner (1995), later a leading broodmare
- Caractacus: 1862 Epsom Derby winner
- Caravel: Winner of the Breeders' Cup Turf Sprint in 2022 and the Jaipur Stakes in 2023
- Carbine: Outstanding racehorse and sire; winner of the Melbourne Cup
- Cardigan Bay: New Zealand's "million dollar pacer"; the first to win a million in the US; appeared on The Ed Sullivan Show
- Cardinal Beaufort: 1805 Epsom Derby winner
- Caressing: 2000 Breeders' Cup Juvenile Fillies winner
- Carry Back: 1961 Kentucky Derby and Preakness Stakes winner, listed as #83 on Top 100 American racehorses of the 20th Century
- Cash Run: 1999 Breeders' Cup Juvenile Fillies winner
- Castleshane: Winner of eight flat races and two jumps
- Cat Thief: 1999 Breeders' Cup Classic winner
- Cavalcade: 1934 Kentucky Derby winner and American Horse of the Year
- Cavan: Irish-bred horse that won the 1958 Belmont Stakes
- Caveat: 1983 Belmont Stakes winner
- Ce Ce: 2021 Breeders' Cup Filly & Mare Sprint winner and American champion female sprint horse
- Cedric: 1824 Epsom Derby winner
- Celtic Ash: British-bred horse that won the 1960 Belmont Stakes
- Cempaka: 1976 Indonesia Derby Winner
- Cesario: Japanese-bred racehorse, winner of the 2005 Yushun Himba and American Oaks
- Chaldean: 2023 2000 Guineas Stakes winner
- Challacombe: 1905 St Leger Stakes winner
- Challedon: 1939 Preakness Stakes winner, American Horse of the Year in 1939 and 1940. Ranked a Top 100 American racehorse of the 20th Century
- Chamant: 1877 2000 Guineas Stakes winner
- Champagne Room: 2016 Breeders' Cup Juvenile Fillies winner
- Champion: 1800 Epsom Derby and St Leger Stakes winner
- Chance Shot: 1927 Belmont Stakes winner
- Chant: 1894 Kentucky Derby winner
- Charismatic: Winner of the 1999 Kentucky Derby and Preakness Stakes
- Charles the Twelfth: Winner of the St Leger Stakes in the year 1839.
- Charlottown: Epsom Derby winner in 1966
- Chateaugay: 1963 Kentucky Derby and Belmont Stakes winner
- Cherokee Run: 1994 Breeders' Cup Sprint winner, American champion sprint horse
- Cheval Grand: Winner of the 2017 Japan Cup
- Chief Bearhart: Canadian horse that won the 1996 Breeders' Stakes and the 1997 Breeders' Cup Turf. Canadian horse of the year in 1997 and 1998, and American champion male turf horse in 1997
- Chief's Crown: 1984 Breeders' Cup Juvenile and 1985 Blue Grass Stakes winner. Later a successful sire
- Chorister: 1831 St Leger Stakes winner
- Christmas Day: 2026 Epsom Derby winner
- Chrono Genesis: 2020 JRA Special Award winner due to her victories in the Takarazuka Kinen and Arima Kinen in that year
- Chulmleigh: 1937 St Leger Stakes winner
- Churchill: Winner of the 2017 2000 Guineas Stakes and the Irish 2,000 Guineas
- Cicero: Winner of the 1905 Epsom Derby as the shortest-priced successful favourite in the history of the event
- Cigar: Champion in the 1990s who won 16 consecutive races
- Citation: U.S. Triple Crown winner (1948); also won 16 consecutive major stakes races; first horse to earn $1 million
- Citizen Bull: 2024 Breeders' Cup Juvenile winner
- City of Light: Winner of the 2018 Breeders' Cup Dirt Mile and 2019 Pegasus World Cup
- City of Troy: 2024 Epsom Derby winner. Cartier Horse of the Year in 2024
- Clairiere: Winner of the 2021 edition of the Cotillion Stakes and 2-time winner of the Ogden Phipps Stakes in both 2022 and 2023.
- Classic Cliche: 1995 St Leger Stakes and 1996 Ascot Gold Cup winner
- Classic Empire: 2016 Breeders' Cup Juvenile winner
- Classy 'n Smart: Winner of two legs of Canadian Triple Tiara, later leading broodmare in North America
- Clarissimus: 1916 2000 Guineas Stakes and Champion Stakes winner
- Cloud Computing: 2017 Preakness Stakes winner
- Cloverbrook: 1877 Preakness Stakes and Belmont Stakes winner
- Clyde Van Dusen: 1929 Kentucky Derby winner, named after his trainer Clyde Van Dusen, and is the only Kentucky Derby winner to be named in such a manner
- Coastal: 1979 Belmont Stakes winner
- Cockfighter: 1799 St Leger Stakes winner
- Cockney Rebel: 2007 2000 Guineas Stakes and Irish 2,000 Guineas winner
- Codex: Winner of the 1980 Preakness Stakes
- Cody's Wish: 2022 and 2023 Breeders' Cup Dirt Mile winner, 2023 American Horse of the Year; named after the late Cody Dorman who met him as a foal on a 2018 trip sponsored by Make-a-Wish
- Colin: 1908 Belmont Stakes winner, American Horse of the Year in 1907 and 1908, ranked as a top-100 American racehorse of the 20th Century
- Colombo: 1934 2000 Guineas Stakes winner
- Colonel Holloway: 1912 Preakness Stakes winner
- Colonial Affair: 1993 Belmont Stakes winner
- Colorado: Winner of the 2000 Guineas Stakes in 1926 and the Eclipse Stakes in 1927
- Colt by Fidget: 1797 Epsom Derby winner. Unnamed horse referred to only as being sired by Fidget
- Commanche Run: 1984 St Leger Stakes and 1985 Irish Champion Stakes winner
- Commander in Chief: Winner of the Epsom Derby and Irish Derby in 1993
- Commandment: 2026 Florida Derby winner
- Commando: 1901 Belmont Stakes winner, American Horse of the Year in 1900 and 1901, later a leading sire in North America
- Commendable: 2000 Belmont Stakes winner
- Common: Fifth horse to win the English Triple Crown (1891)
- Company: First Japanese eight-year-old horse to win an international G1 race (2009 Tennō Shō (Autumn))
- Comrade: First winner of the Prix de l'Arc de Triomphe
- Concern: Arkansas Derby and Breeders' Cup Classic winner in 1994
- Conduit: Irish-bred horse that won four group-1/grade-1 events, including the 2008 St. Leger Stakes and the 2008 & 2009 Breeders' Cup Turf
- Conquistador Cielo: 1982 Belmont Stakes winner and American Horse of the Year
- Continuous: 2023 St Leger Stakes winner
- Contrail: 2020 Japanese Triple Crown winner and third ever horse to win the Japanese Triple Crown while undefeated, with additional G1 victories in the Hopeful Stakes and Japan Cup
- Cool Reception: Canadian Hall-of-Fame horse, won seven consecutive races as a two-year-old
- Copano Rickey: Japanese thoroughbred nicknamed the "great actor of the dirt" with eleven total G1/JpnI wins
- Corinthian: Inaugural winner of the Breeders' Cup Dirt Mile in 2007
- Corniche: 2021 Breeders' Cup Juvenile winner
- Coroebus: 2000 Guineas Stakes and St James's Palace Stakes in 2022
- Coronach: Winner of the Epsom Derby and St Leger Stakes in 1926
- Coronation (France): Winner of the Poule d'Essai des Pouliches and the Prix de l'Arc de Triomphe in 1949
- Coronation (UK): 1841 Epsom Derby winner
- Cosmah: Influential broodmare, dam of Halo and Tosmah
- Cossack: 1847 Epsom Derby winner
- Cotherstone: 1843 2000 Guineas Stakes and Epsom Derby winner
- Cougar: Chilean-bred horse that competed in the United States. American champion male turf horse in 1972
- Count Fleet: sixth winner of the American Triple Crown (1943), named #5 in list of top-100 racehorses of the 20th Century. Later became a leading sire after racing
- Count Turf: 1951 Kentucky Derby winner
- Counterpoint: 1951 Belmont Stakes winner, 1951 American Horse of the Year
- Countess Diana: 1997 Breeders' Cup Juvenile Fillies winner
- Country House: Winner of Kentucky Derby 2019 after Maximum Security was demoted from 1st place for interference with other horses
- Court Martial: 1945 2000 Guineas Stakes and Champion Stakes winner
- Court Vision: Five-time Grade I winner, including 2011 Breeders' Cup Mile
- Coventry: 1925 Preakness Stakes winner
- Cozzene: 1985 Breeders' Cup Mile winner, American champion male turf horse
- Craig an Eran: 1921 2000 Guineas Stakes, St James's Palace Stakes, and Eclipse Stakes winner
- Creator: 2016 Belmont Stakes winner
- Creme Fraiche: 1985 Belmont Stakes winner
- Cremorne: Winner of the 1872 Epsom Derby, Grand Prix de Paris, and 1873 Ascot Gold Cup
- Crepello: 1957 2000 Guineas Stakes and Epsom Derby winner
- Crisp: Remembered for his epic race in the Grand National with Red Rum
- Croix du Nord: Japanese racehorse who won the 2024 Hopeful Stakes, 2025 Tokyo Yūshun, 2026 Osaka Hai, and 2026 Tennō Shō (Spring)
- Crow: 1976 St Leger Stakes winner
- Crucifix: Winner of the 1000 Guineas Stakes, 2000 Guineas Stakes, and Epsom Oaks in 1840. A successful broodmare after racing
- Crusader: 1926 Belmont Stakes winner and American Horse of the Year
- Cryptoclearance: Multiple Grade-1 stakes winner
- Culpepper: 1874 Preakness Stakes winner
- Curlin: Third richest US-based horse of all time, winner of 2007 Preakness Stakes and Breeders' Cup Classic and 2008 Dubai World Cup
- Curren Chan: Japanese racehorse known for winning five consecutive sprint races and two JRA Awards
- Cut Above: 1981 St Leger Stakes winner
- Cwrw: 1812 2000 Guineas Stakes winner

=== D ===
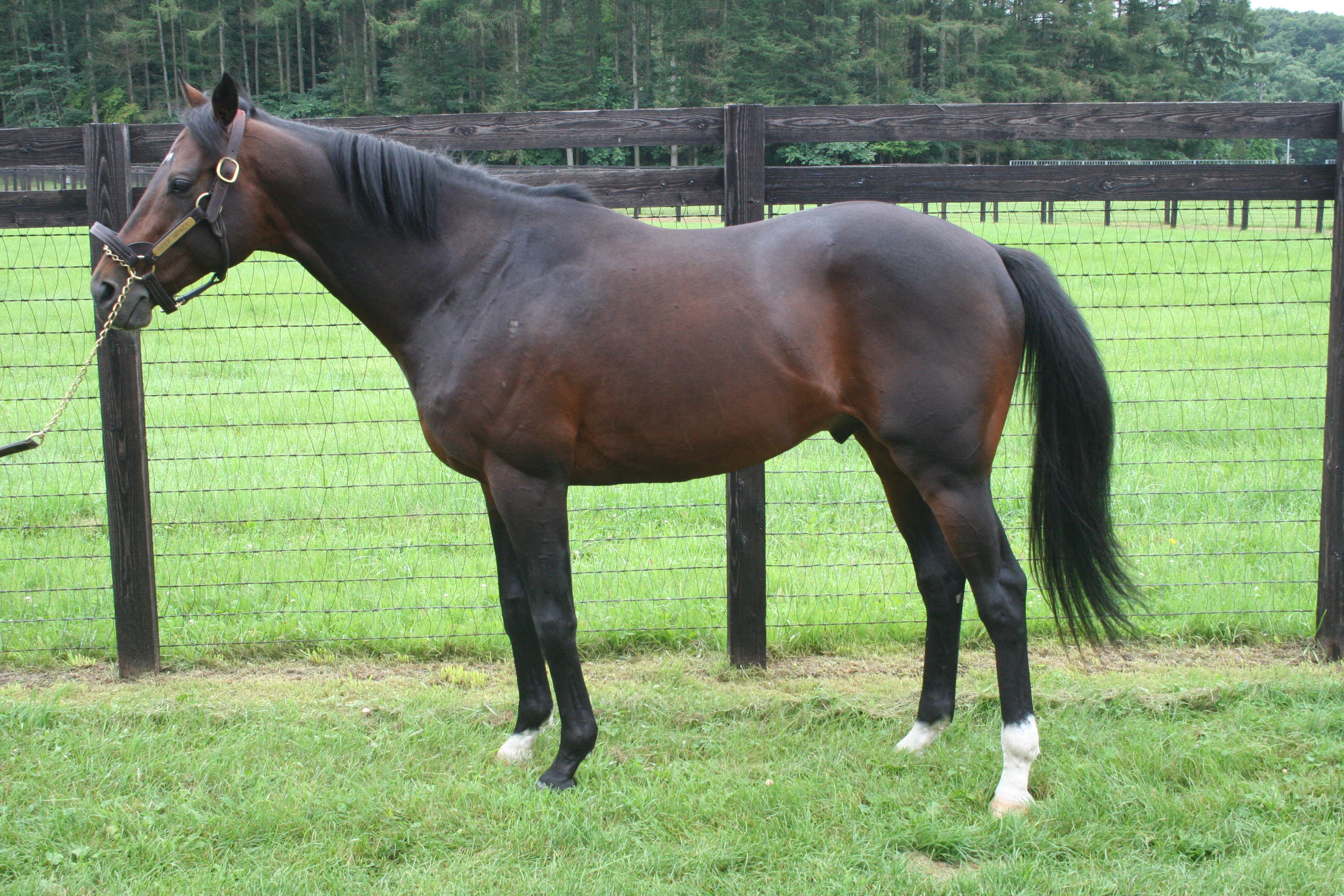
Deep Impact

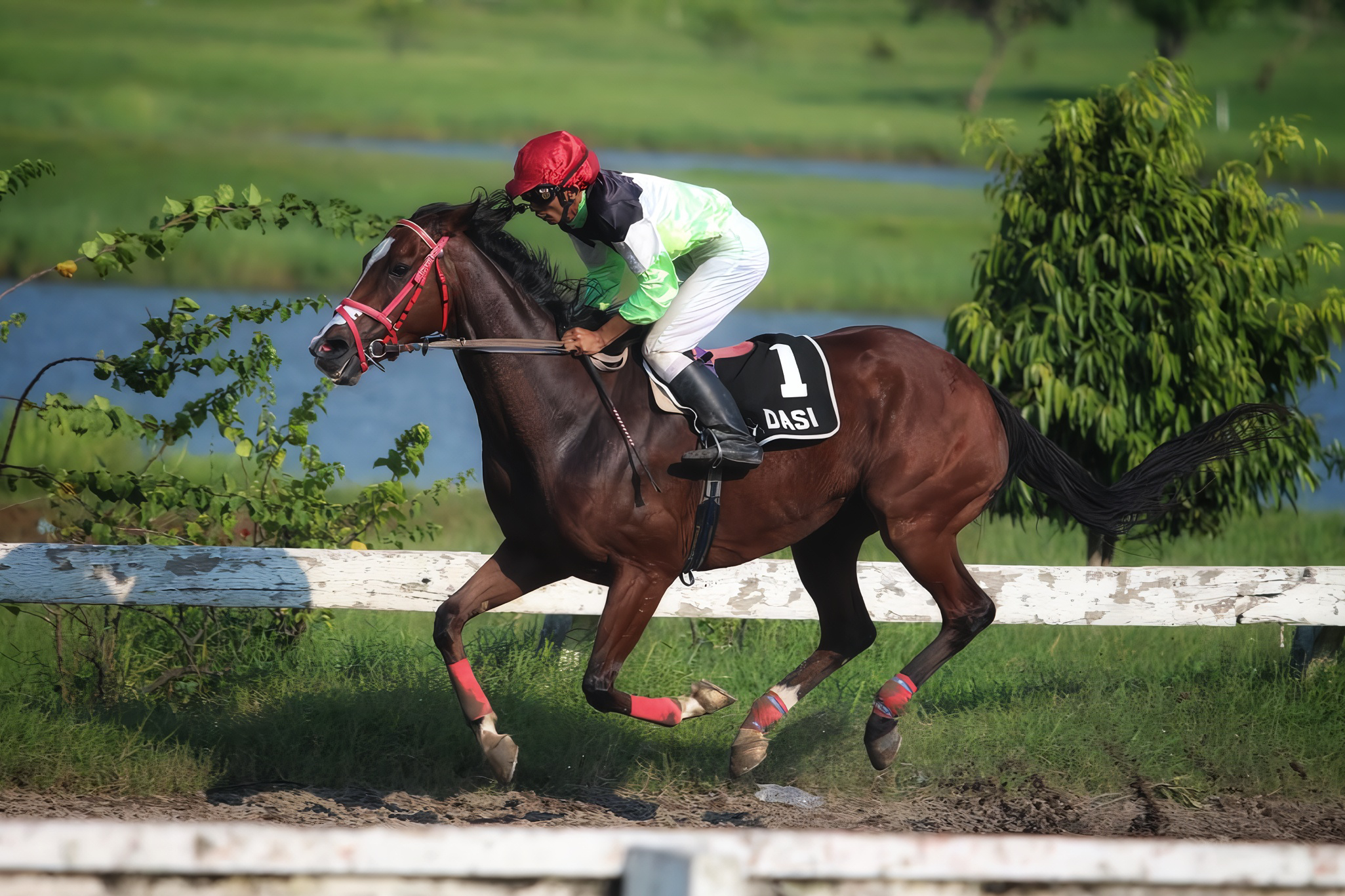
Djohar Manik

- Da Hoss: Breeders' Cup Mile winner in 1996 and 1998
- Da' Tara: 2008 Belmont Stakes winner
- Daedalus: 1794 Epsom Derby winner
- Daiichi Ruby: 1991 Yasuda Kinen and Sprinters Stakes winner
- Daitaku Helios: Winner of the 1991 and 1992 Mile Championship
- Daiwa Major: Winner of the 2004 Satsuki Shō, 2006 Tennō Shō (Autumn), 2006 and 2007 Mile Championship, and 2007 Yasuda Kinen; two-time winner of the JRA Award for Best Sprinter or Miler (2006, 2007)
- Daiwa Scarlet: Winner of the Oka Sho, Shuka Sho, and Queen Elizabeth II Cup (Japan), first filly in 37 years to win the Arima Kinen, never placed lower than second in all of her races, and half-sister to Daiwa Major
- Damascus: 1967 Preakness Stakes and Belmont Stakes winner, American Horse of the Year and ranked in the Top 100 American racehorses of the 20th Century
- Damrosch: 1916 Preakness Stakes winner
- Dan Patch: America's greatest pacer, who performed so dominantly in races that other owners began to refuse to enter races with him; lived out the remainder of his career performing in time trials and exhibitions as a celebrity
- Dance in the Dark: 1996 Kikuka-shō winner.
- Dance Smartly: Second Canadian filly ever to win the Canadian Triple Crown, and the first to win a Breeders Cup Race
- Dancing Brave: 1986 2000 Guineas Stakes and Prix de l'Arc de Triomphe winner. Also won King George VI and Queen Elizabeth Stakes and Eclipse Stakes
- Dancing in Silks: 2009 Breeders' Cup sprint winner, co-California horse of the year
- Dancing Spree: 1989 Breeders' Cup Sprint winner
- Danedream: Winner of the Prix de l'Arc de Triomphe, King George VI and Queen Elizabeth Stakes, Grosser Preis von Berlin, and Grosser Preis von Baden, won the Cartier Champion Three-year-old Filly and German Horse of the Year awards
- Danehill: American-bred and British-trained sprint champion who went on to become a champion sire in both the northern and southern hemispheres; the first major "shuttle stallion"
- Danehill Dancer: Champion 2-year-old in Ireland that won the Phoenix Stakes and National Stakes. Leading sire in Great Britain and Ireland in 2009
- Dangerous: 1833 Epsom Derby winner
- Dangerous Midge: American-bred British-trained horse that won the Breeders' Cup Turf in 2010
- Daniel O'Rourke: 1852 Epsom Derby winner
- Dank: British horse that won the Breeders' Cup Filly & Mare Turf in 2013
- Danon Decile: Winner of the 2024 Tokyo Yūshun and 2025 Dubai Sheema Classic
- Dante: 1945 Epsom Derby winner
- Dantsu Flame: 2002 Takarazuka Kinen winner
- Danzig: Most commercially successful sire in the second half of the 20th Century, the sire of nearly 200 graded stakes winners
- Danzig Connection: 1986 Belmont Stakes winner.
- Daring Tact: Winner of the Japanese Triple Tiara in 2020
- Darius: 1954 2000 Guineas Stakes and St James's Palace Stakes winner, and 1955 Eclipse Stakes winner
- Dark Star: 1953 Kentucky Derby winner
- Daryz: 2025 & 2026 Prix de l'Arc de Triomphe winner
- Dauber: 1938 Preakness Stakes winner
- David Junior: 2005 Champion Stakes and 2006 Dubai Duty Free and Eclipse Stakes winner
- Dawn Approach: 2013 2000 Guineas Stakes and St James's Palace Stakes. Cartier Champion Two-year-old Colt in 2012
- Dawn Run: Only horse ever to complete Champion Hurdle, Cheltenham Gold Cup double
- Day Star: 1878 Kentucky Derby winner
- Dayatthespa: 2014 Breeders' Cup Filly & Mare Turf winner
- Daylami: Irish-bred French-trained horse that won 7-grade 1/group 1 races. European Horse of the Year in 1999
- Decidedly: 1962 Kentucky Derby winner
- Deep Brillante: 2012 Tōkyō Yūshun winner
- Deep Impact: Japanese Triple Crown winner with seven Grade 1 victories, second ever Japanese horse to win the Triple Crown while undefeated; set and held the world record over 3200 metres from 2006 until it was surpassed by Kitasan Black in 2017; seven-time Leading sire in Japan, sire of Gentildonna and Contrail
- Delhi: 1904 Belmont Stakes winner, American champion 3-year-old-male in 1904 and champion older horse in 1905
- Delta Blues: 2004 Kikuka-shō and 2006 Melbourne Cup winner
- Deputed Testamony: 1983 Preakness Stakes winner, last Maryland-bred horse to win the Preakness
- Deputy Minister: Canadian-bred horse who was both American and Canadian champion 2-year-old in 1981, and Canadian Horse of the Year the same year. Later was the lead sire in North America in 1997 and 1998
- Desert Crown: 2022 Epsom Derby winner
- Desert Gold: Race mare who won 19 races successive races during World War I; often raced against Gloaming
- Desert Orchid: Won King George four times and Cheltenham Gold Cup
- Determine: 1954 Kentucky Derby winner, first grey horse to win the Kentucky Derby
- Diamond Jubilee: 9th horse to win the English Triple Crown (1900), later a leading sire in Argentina
- Didelot: 1796 Epsom Derby winner
- Diomed: Winner of the inaugural Epsom Derby in 1780
- Diophon: 1924 2000 Guineas Stakes winner
- Discovery: Top-100 American racehorse of 20th century, 1935 American Horse of the Year
- Display: 1926 Preakness Stakes winner
- Disraeli: 1898 2000 Guineas Stakes winner
- Ditto: 1803 Epsom Derby winner
- Djebel: French horse that won 15 of 22 races, including the Prix d'Essai and 2000 Guineas Stakes in 1940, and the Prix de l'Arc de Triomphe in 1942. Later a leading sire in France.
- Djohar Manik: Indonesia Triple Crown Winner (2014), won 37 of the 41 races she participated in, the third Triple Crown Winner in Indonesia.
- Do Deuce: 2024 Japanese Horse of the Year, winner of the Japanese Derby and Arima Kinen
- Domedriver: Irish-bred French-trained horse that won the Breeders' Cup Mile in 2002
- Don Enrique: 1907 Preakness Stakes winner
- Don John: 1838 St Leger Stakes winner
- Don't Forget Me: 1987 2000 Guineas Stakes and Irish 2,000 Guineas winner
- Donativum: British horse that won the Breeders' Cup Juvenile Turf in 2008
- Donau: 1910 Kentucky Derby winner
- Doncaster: 1873 Epsom Derby and 1875 Ascot Gold Cup winner, sire of the great Bend Or
- Donerail: 1913 Kentucky Derby winner, holds record for biggest upset in Kentucky Derby history after winning with 91-1 odds
- Donovan: Winner of the Epsom Derby and St. Leger Stakes in 1889
- Doricles: 1901 St Leger Stakes winner
- Dornoch: 2024 Belmont Stakes winner
- Dotted Swiss: 1960 Hollywood Gold Cup winner
- Doyoun: 1988 2000 Guineas Stakes winner
- Dr Devious: Winner of the 1992 Epsom Derby and Irish Champion Stakes
- Dr. Fager: "The Doctor"; set the world record at 1 mile on any surface, 1:32 1/5, and held it for more than 20 years. The only horse in American history who in 1968 won 'Racings Grand Slam'.
- Dr. Freeland: 1929 Preakness Stakes winner
- Dream Journey: Winner of 3 GI races, including the Takarazuka and Arima Kinen of 2009. Full brother of Orfevre.
- Dreaming of Anna: Winner of the Breeders' Cup Juvenile Fillies in 2006, and named American champion 2-year-old filly
- Drefong: 2016 Breeders' Cup Sprint winner, American champion sprint horse
- Drosselmeyer: 2010 Belmont Stakes and 2011 Breeders' Cup Classic winner
- Dubai Majesty: 2010 Breeders' Cup Filly & Mare Sprint and American champion female sprint horse
- Duke of Magenta: 1878 Preakness Stakes and Belmont Stakes winner
- Dunboyne: 1887 Preakness Stakes winner
- Dunfermline: 1977 Epsom Oaks and St Leger Stakes winner. Owned by Queen Elizabeth II
- Duramente: Satsuki Sho and Japanese Derby winner, leading sire whose progeny include Titleholder and Liberty Island
- Durezza: 2023 Kikuka-shō winner
- Durbar: French horse that won the 1914 Epsom Derby
- Durandal: Winner of 2003 Sprinters Stakes and two-time winner of the Mile Championship
- Dust Commander: 1970 Kentucky Derby winner
- Dutch Oven: 1882 Yorkshire Oaks and St Leger Stakes winner
- Dynaformer: Sire of Barbaro

=== E ===
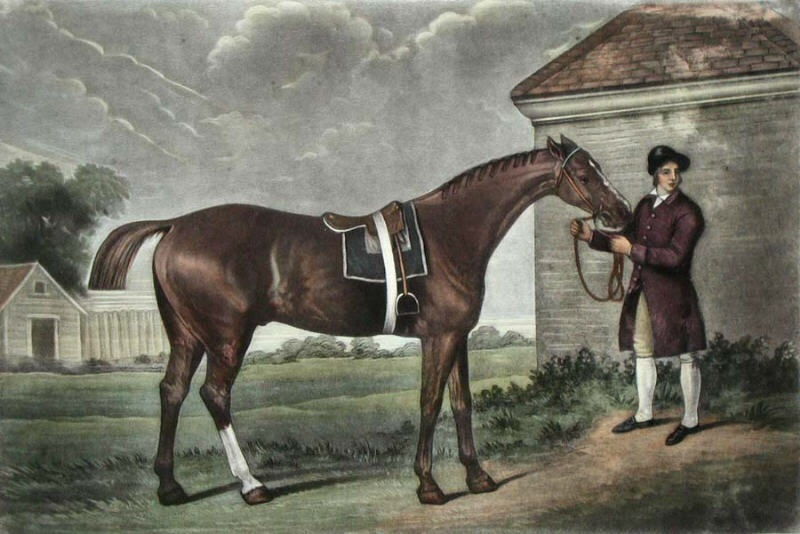
Eclipse

- Eager: 1791 Epsom Derby winner
- Early Voting: 2022 Preakness Stakes winner
- Easy Goer: Hall of Fame champion who ran the fastest mile of all time on dirt by any three-year-old Thoroughbred in 1:32.2; ran the second fastest Belmont Stakes of all time behind Secretariat; had a great rivalry with Sunday Silence
- Ebor: 1817 St Leger Stakes winner
- Echo Zulu: 2021 Breeders' Cup Juvenile Fillies and American champion two-year-old filly
- Eclipse: Celebrated 18th-century racehorse that won 18 races in 18 starts; influential sire
- Ecoro Duel: Steeplechase race horse who won four J-G1 races, including the Nakayama Grand Jump twice (2025, 2026), becoming the third horse in JRA history to win three J-G1 steeplechase races
- Editor's Note: 1996 Belmont Stakes winner
- Effendi: 1909 Preakness Stakes winner, made 160 career starts
- Efforia: Winner of 3 Grade I races in Japan.
- Eight Belles: First filly to win the Martha Washington Stakes, by a record 13½ lengths
- Eillo: Inaugural winner of the Breeders' Cup Sprint
- Eishin Flash: Winner of the 2010 Tokyo Yūshun and 2012 Tennō Shō (Autumn)
- El Condor Pasa: Winner of Grade I races in Japan and France; first Japanese trained horse to finish 2nd in the Prix de l'Arc de Triomphe
- El Gran Senor: American-bred Irish-trained horse that won the 2000 Guineas Stakes and Irish Derby in 1984
- Eldaafer: Winner of the Breeders' Cup Marathon in 2010
- Eleanor: 1801 Epsom Derby and Epsom Oaks winner, first filly to win the Derby
- Election: 1807 Epsom Derby winner, later a leading sire in Britain and Ireland
- Elis: 1836 St Leger Stakes winner
- Elite Power: Two-time winner of the Breeders' Cup Sprint
- Eliza: 1992 Breeders' Cup Juvenile Fillies winner
- Ellangowan: 1923 2000 Guineas Stakes, St James's Palace Stakes, and Champion Stakes winner
- Ellington: 1856 Epsom Derby winner
- Elocutionist: 1976 Preakness Stakes winner
- Elusive Quality: record-setting sprinter who later became a leading sire in the US, including being the sire of Smarty Jones
- Elwood: 1904 Kentucky Derby winner, first horse bred and owned by a woman to win the race
- Emilius: 1823 Epsom Derby winner
- Empery: 1976 Epsom Derby winner
- Empire Maker: 2003 Belmont Stakes winner
- Enable: Twice winner of the Prix de l'Arc de Triomphe, record three-time winner of the King George VI and Queen Elizabeth Stakes and the 2018 winner of the Breeders' Cup Turf
- Encke: 2012 St Leger Stakes winner
- Energico: 2025 Kikuka-shō winner
- English Channel: 2007 Breeders' Cup Turf winner and American champion male turf horse. Successful sire after racing
- Enterprise: 1887 2000 Guineas Stakes winner
- Enthusiast: 1889 2000 Guineas Stakes and Sussex Stakes winner
- Entrepreneur: 1997 2000 Guineas Stakes winner
- Epiphaneia: Won the 2013 Kikuka Sho and 2014 Japan Cup; sired the aforementioned Efforia and Daring Tact
- Epitome: 1987 Breeders' Cup Juvenile Fillies winner and successful broodmare
- Equinox: Two-time winner of the Autumn edition of the Tennō Shō, as well as both Arima and Takarazuka Kinens, and the Dubai Sheema Classic
- Erhaab: 1994 Epsom Derby winner
- Escena: 1998 Breeders' Cup Distaff winner and American champion older mare
- Espoir City: Japanese racehorse specializing in dirt who received the JRA Award for Best Dirt Horse in 2009 and 2010; winner of the Grade 1 Champions Cup in 2009 and February Stakes in 2010, as well as numerous domestic Grade 1 (JpnI) dirt wins
- Essential Quality: Winner of the Breeders' Cup Juvenile in 2020, and the Belmont Stakes, Travers Stakes, and Blue Grass Stakes in 2021
- Exaggerator: Winner of the 2016 Preakness Stakes
- Expert Eye: British-bred horse that won the City of York Stakes and Breeders' Cup Mile in 2018
- Exterminator: Exceedingly popular "iron horse" of American racing history

=== F ===
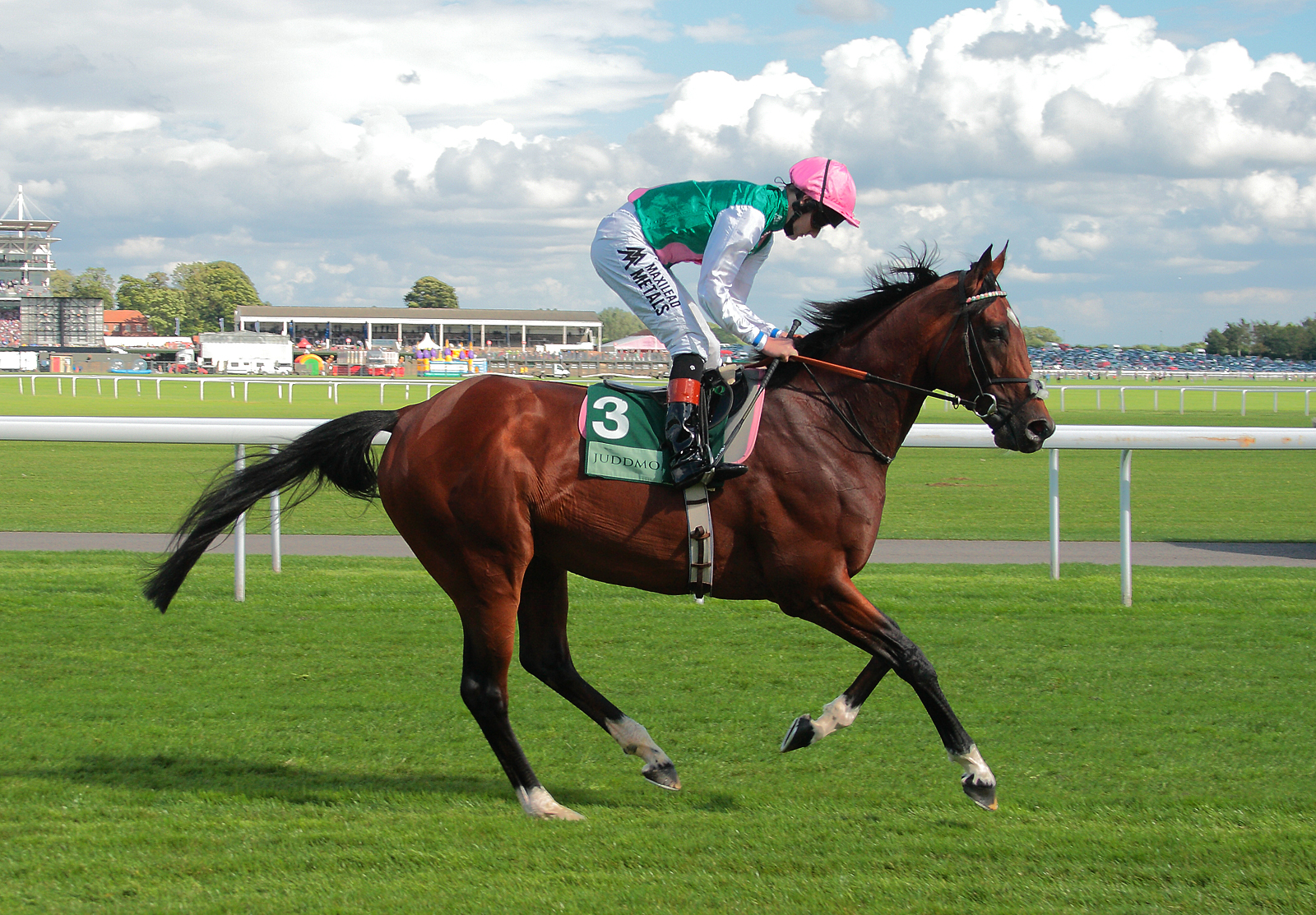
Frankel

- Fabius: 1956 Preakness Stakes winner
- Fair Play: Successful American Thoroughbred racehorse and very successful sire; sired the great Man o' War
- Faireno: 1932 Belmont Stakes winner
- Fairway: 1928 Eclipse Stakes and St Leger Stakes winner, and 1929 Jockey Club Cup winner.
- Falling In Love: Indonesian racehorse
- Fantastic Light: American-bred British-and-Dubai-trained multiple grade-1 stakes winner, including the 2000 Hong Kong Cup, 2001 Prince of Wales's Stakes, Irish Champion Stakes, and Breeders' Cup Turf. American champion male turf horse and European horse of the year in 2001
- Fappiano: Major sire, most notably of Unbridled
- Faugh-a-Ballagh: 1844 St Leger Stakes winner. An influential sire in both Britain and France after racing
- Faultless: 1947 Preakness Stakes winner
- Favonius: 1871 Epsom Derby winner
- Favorite Trick: Breeders' Cup Juvenile and American Horse of the Year in 1997.
- Felstead: 1928 Epsom Derby winner
- Fenian: 1869 Belmont Stakes winner
- Fenomeno: Two-time winner of the Tennō Shō (Spring), ranked top in the world in the 2013 World's Best Racehorse Rankings's extended distance category
- Ferdinand: winner of the 1986 Kentucky Derby and 1987 Breeders' Cup Classic
- Fierceness: 2023 Breeders' Cup Juvenile and 2024 Florida Derby & Travers Stakes winner
- Fierement: 2018 Kikuka-shō and 2019 & 2020 Spring Tennō Shō winner
- Fifinella: 1916 Epsom Derby and Epsom Oaks winner
- Filho da Puta: 1815 St Leger Stakes winner. Later a leading sire in Britain and Ireland
- Fine Motion: Irish-bred Japanese-trained horse that won the Shūka Shō in 2002
- Firdaussi: 1932 St Leger Stakes winner
- First Dude: 2011 Hollywood Gold Cup and Alysheba Stakes winner
- Flaming Page: Canadian Oaks and Queen's Plate winner in 1962. Best known as being the dam of Nijinsky.
- Flamingo: 1928 2000 Guineas Stakes winner
- Flanders: 1994 Breeders' Cup Juvenile Fillies winner
- Flightline: 2022 Breeders' Cup Classic winner and American Horse of the Year
- Flocarline: First filly to win the Preakness Stakes (1903)
- Fly So Free: 1990 Breeders' Cup Juvenile and 1991 Florida Derby winner
- Flying Ebony: 1925 Kentucky Derby winner
- Flying Fox: Eight horse to win the English Triple Crown (1899). Later a leading sire in France
- Flyingbolt: Widely considered as the second best steeplechase horseracer of all-time; stablemate of Arkle; Timeform rated 210. Rated 1 lb inferior to Arkle by the Official Handicapper
- Folklore: 2005 Breeders' Cup Juvenile Fillies winner
- Fonso: 1880 Kentucky Derby winner
- Foolish Pleasure: Winner of the 1975 Kentucky Derby
- Footstepsinthesand: 2005 2000 Guineas Stakes winner
- Forester: 1882 Belmont Stakes winner
- Forever Together (Ireland): 2018 Oaks Stakes winner
- Forever Together (US): winner of the Breeders' Cup Filly & Mare Turf in 2008
- Forever Unbridled: 2017 Breeders' cup Distaff winner, American champion 3-year-old dirt filly
- Forever Young: Winner of the Saudi Cup (2025, 2026), Saudi Derby (2024), UAE Derby (2024), Japan Dirt Classic (2024), Tokyo Daishōten (2024), and the Breeders' Cup Classic (2025). Awarded the JRA Award (2024).
- Formosa: Winner of the St Leger Stakes, 1000 Guineas Stakes, Epsom Oaks, and tied for first in a dead-head in the 2000 Guineas Stakes in 1868. First horse to win the English filly's triple crown
- Fort Larned: 2012 Breeders' Cup Classic winner
- Fort Marcy: Two-time winner of the Washington D.C. International
- Forte: 2022 Breeders' Cup Juvenile and 2023 Florida Derby winner
- Forward Pass: 1968 Kentucky Derby and Preakness Stakes winner, first horse to inherit a Kentucky Derby win from a disqualification of another horse
- Found: Irish horse that won the Breeders' Cup Turf in 2015 and the Prix de l'Arc de Triomphe in 2016. Cartier Champion Older Horse in 2016
- Foxford: 1891 Belmont Stakes winner
- Fraise: 1992 Breeders' Cup Turf winner
- Frankel: Undefeated in 14 career starts; highest rated flat race horse in history: WTR 140; Timeform 147, Racing Post 143
- Frederick: 1829 Epsom Derby winner
- Friar Rock: 1916 Belmont Stakes winner and American Horse of the Year
- Fuji Kiseki: Undefeated Japanese racehorse in four starts before retirement due to injury, influential breeding stallion
- Funny Cide: First gelding since Clyde Van Dusen to win the Kentucky Derby
- Further Ado: 2026 Blue Grass Stakes and Breeders' Cup Dirt Mile winner
- Furthest Land: 2009 Breeders' Cup Dirt Mile winner
- Fusaichi Pandora: 2006 Queen Elizabeth II Cup winner
- Fusaichi Pegasus: 2000 Kentucky Derby winner
- Fyldener: 1806 St Leger Stakes winner

=== G ===
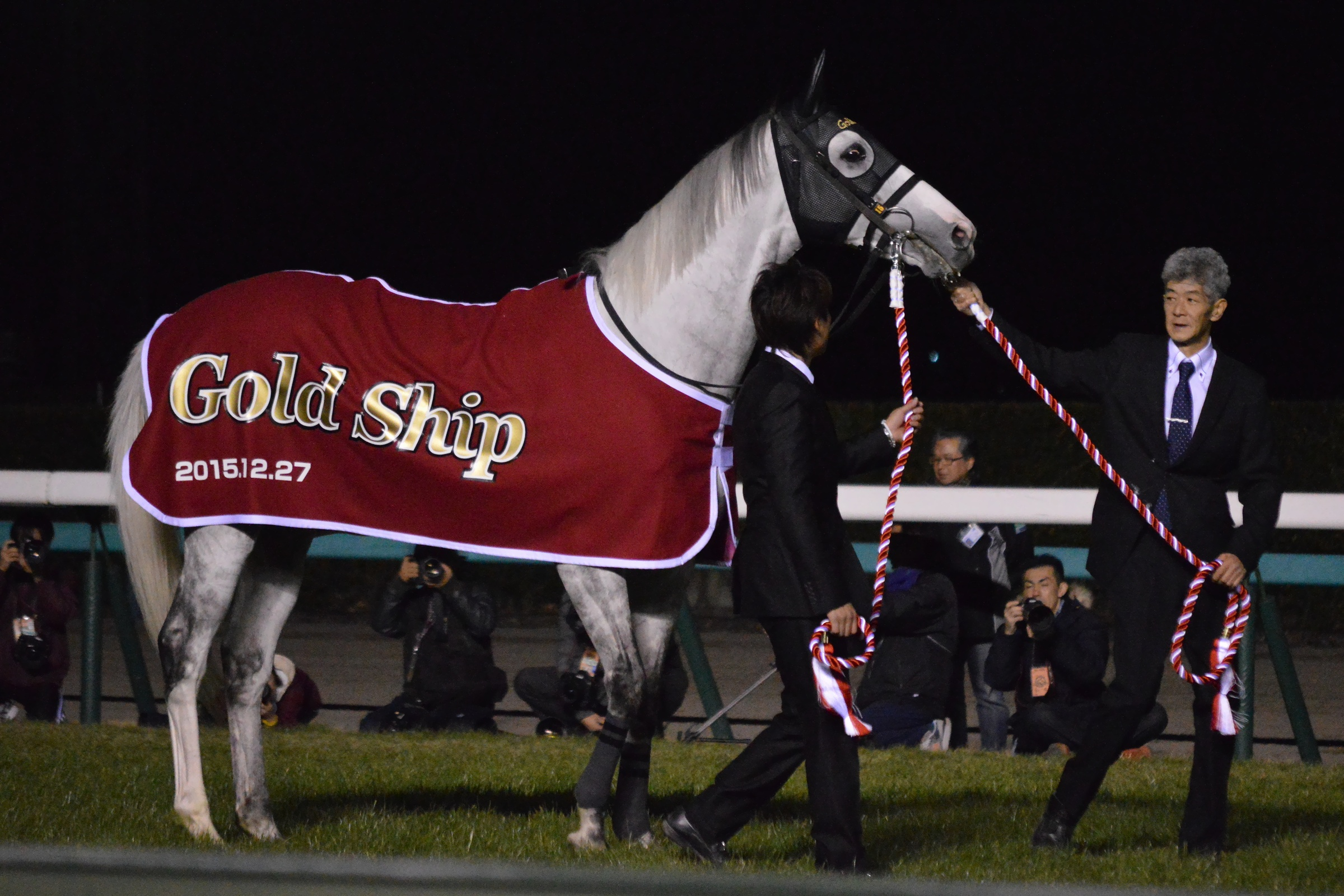
Gold Ship

- Gainsborough: Winner of the English Triple Crown in 1918; leading sire
- Galcador: 1950 Epsom Derby winner
- Galileo: 2001 Epsom Derby and Irish Derby winner. Seven-time Leading sire in Great Britain & Ireland; sire of Frankel; has sired 102 Group 1 winners worldwide as of December 2015
- Galileo Chrome: 2020 St Leger Stakes winner
- Galileo Gold: 2016 2000 Guineas Stakes and St James's Palace Stakes winner
- Gallahadion: 1940 Kentucky Derby winner
- Gallant Fox: 2nd winner of the American Triple Crown (1930), #28 on list of Top 100 American racehorses in the 20th Century
- Galliard: 1883 2000 Guineas Stakes winner
- Galopin: 1875 Epsom Derby winner, leading sire in Great Britain and Ireland 1888, 1889, and 1898
- Galtee More: Seventh horse to win the English Triple Crown (1897)
- Game Winner: 2018 Breeders' Cup Juvenile
- Gamine: 2020 Acorn Stakes and Breeders' Cup Filly & Mare Sprint winner. American champion female sprint horse for 2020
- Gang Forward: 1873 2000 Guineas Stakes and St James's Palace Stakes winner
- Garden Path: 1944 2000 Guineas Stakes winner
- Gate Dancer: 1984 Preakness Stakes winner
- Gato Del Sol: 1982 Kentucky Derby winner
- Gay Crusader: Winner of the English wartime Triple Crown in 1917
- General Duke: 1868 Belmont Stakes winner and American champion 3-year-old colt
- Generous: 1991 Epsom Derby and Irish Derby winner
- Gentildonna: Japanese Fillies' Triple Crown winner of 2012 and two-time winner of the Japan Cup (2012, 2013) with seven grade 1 victories overall
- Genuine Risk: Second filly to win the Kentucky Derby (1980)
- George Frederick: 1874 Epsom Derby winner
- George Kinney: 1883 Belmont Stakes winner
- George Smith, 1916 Kentucky Derby winner
- George Washington: 2006 2000 Guineas Stakes winner. Cartier Champion Two-year-old Colt in 2005 and Champion Three-year-old in 2006
- Ghanaati: 2009 1000 Guineas Stakes and Coronation Stakes winner
- Ghostzapper: 2004 Breeders' Cup Classic winner, American Horse of the Year and World's Top Ranked Horse in 2004
- Giacomo: 2005 Kentucky Derby winner
- Giant's Causeway: American-bred Irish-trained horse that won 5 Group One races Great Britain and Ireland. Cartier Horse of the Year in 2000. Later a leading sire in both Britain and North America
- Gilded Time: 1992 Breeders' Cup Juvenile winner
- Gilles de Retz: 1956 2000 Guineas Stakes winner
- Ginger Punch: 2007 Breeders' Cup Distaff winner and American champion older mare, successful broodmare in Japan after racing
- Girvin: 2017 Haskell Invitational Stakes winner
- Gladiateur: French horse that won the English Triple Crown in 1865. Also won Grand Prix de Paris in 1865 and Ascot Gold Cup in 1866. Considered one of the greatest racehorses of the 19th Century
- Glass Slippers: British horse that won the Prix de l'Abbaye de Longchamp in 2019 and the Flying Five Stakes & Breeders' Cup Turf Sprint in 2020
- Glencoe I: 1834 2000 Guineas Stakes and 1835 Ascot Gold Cup winner. Later a major breeding sire, and the leading sire in North America eight times between 1847 and 1858
- Gleneagles: 2015 2000 Guineas Stakes, Irish 2,000 Guineas, and St James's Palace Stakes winner. Cartier Champion Two-year-old Colt in 2014
- Gloaming: won 19 successive races in New Zealand and Australia; record was 67 starts for 57 wins and 9 seconds
- Go and Go: Irish-bred horse that won the 1990 Belmont Stakes
- Go for Gin: 1994 Kentucky Derby winner
- Go For Wand: 1989 Breeders' Cup Juvenile Fillies and 1990 Alabama Stakes. American champion two-year-old and three-year-old filly. Ranked a Top 100 American racehorse of the 20th Century
- Go Man Go: Champion running Quarter Horse
- Golan: 2001 2000 Guineas Stakes and 2002 King George VI and Queen Elizabeth Stakes winner
- Gold City: 1986 Hanshin Sansai Stakes winner
- Gold Ship: Winner of 6 Grade I races in Japan, two of which were the Takarazuka Kinen (2013, 2014), sire of Meisho Tabaru; well known for his unpredictable temperament
- Golden Horn: 2015 Epsom Derby, Irish Champion Stakes, and Prix de l'Arc de Triomphe. Cartier Horse of the Year for 2015
- Golden Fleece: 1982 Epsom Derby winner
- Golden Miller: Record five-time winner of the Cheltenham Gold Cup; only horse to win the Cheltenham Gold Cup and Grand National in the same year
- Golden Pal: Winner of the Breeders' Cup Juvenile Turf Sprint and Breeders' Cup Turf Sprint
- Golden Sixty: Won the Champions Mile for three years in a row, as well as a number of other GI races in Hong Kong
- Golden Tempo: Winner of the 2026 Kentucky Derby and Belmont Stakes, first winner of said races to be trained by a female trainer (Cherie DeVaux)
- Goldencents: American-bred Racehorse and 2-time winner of the Breeders' Cup Dirt Mile in both 2013 and 2014
- Goldikova: Irish-bred French-trained horse that won 14 total Group 1 races between Great Britain, France, and the US. Only horse to have won the Breeders' Cup Mile three times (2008–2010). European Horse of the Year in 2010
- Goldsmith Maid: Famous harness racing mare of the 19th century
- Good Magic: Winner of the 2017 Breeders Cup: Juvenile, the 2018 Blue Grass Stakes and the 2018 Haskell Stakes
- Goodnight Olive: Winner of the Breeders' Cup Filly & Mare Sprint in 2022 and 2023. American champion female sprint horse in 2022 and 2023
- Gorgos: 1906 2000 Guineas Stakes winner
- Gran Alegria: Japanese mare who dominated various sprint and mile races between 2020 and 2021, with wins including the 2019 Oka Shō, 2020 Yasuda Kinen, 2020 Sprinters Stakes, 2020 and 2021 Mile Championship, and 2021 Victoria Mile
- Grand Parade: 1919 Epsom Derby and St James's Palace Stakes winner
- Granville: 1936 Belmont Stakes winner and American Horse of the Year
- Grass Wonder: Winner of the 1999 Takarazuka and Arima Kinen; sired Screen Hero and Earnestly
- Graustark: Favorite to win American Triple Crown races before injury ended his career. Became a successful sire after being forced to retire from racing
- Great Communicator: 1988 Breeders' Cup Turf winner
- Greek Money: 1962 Preakness Stakes winner
- Green Dancer: Winner of the Poule d'Essai des Poulains in 1975. Later a leading sire in France
- Grenada: 1880 Preakness Stakes, Belmont Stakes, and Travers Stakes winner
- Grey Lag: 1921 Belmont Stakes winner, ranked a Top 100 American racehorse of the 21st Century
- Grey Momus: 1838 2000 Guineas Stakes and Ascot Gold Cup winner
- Greyhound: Named Trotting Horse of the Century in the US
- Grindstone: 1996 Kentucky Derby winner
- Groupie Doll: Breeders' Cup Filly & Mare Sprint winner in 2012 and 2013. American champion female sprint horse in 2012 and 2013
- Grundy: Winner of the Irish Derby, Irish 2,000 Guineas, and Epsom Derby in 1975
- Gulch: 1988 Breeders' Cup Sprint winner, American champion sprint horse
- Gun Runner: 2017 Breeders' Cup Classic winner and American Horse of the Year
- Gunrock: A Thoroughbred stallion who became the mascot of the UC Davis Aggies sports team
- Gustavus: 1821 Epsom Derby winner

=== H ===
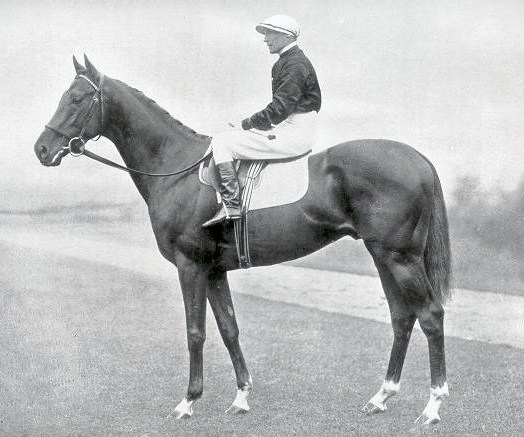
Hyperion

- Haafhd: 2004 2000 Guineas Stakes and Champion Stakes winner
- Hail To All: 1965 Belmont Stakes winner
- Hail To Reason: American Champion Two-Year-Old Colt of 1960 and leading sire in North America
- Haiseiko: Former-NAR racehorse who, after being moved to the JRA, won multiple high stakes races such as the Satsuki Sho and Takarazuka Kinen
- Half Time: 1899 Preakness Stakes winner
- Halfbridled: 2003 Breeders' Cup Juvenile Fillies winner
- Halma: 1895 Kentucky Derby winner, first Kentucky Derby winner to sire another Kentucky Derby winner (sired Alan-a-Dale)
- Halo: Two-time American leading sire and sire of Sunday Silence
- Hambletonian: 1795 St Leger Stakes winner. A successful sire after racing
- Hambletonian 10: The "father of American trotting"
- Handicapper: 1901 2000 Guineas Stakes winner
- Hannah: Winner of the 1871 1000 Guineas Stakes, Epsom Oaks, and St Leger Stakes. 2nd horse to win the British Fillies Triple Crown
- Hannibal: 1804 Epsom Derby winner
- Hanover: 1887 Belmont Stakes winner and American Horse of the Year. Later was the leading sire in North America for four consecutive years (1895–98)
- Hansel: 1991 Preakness Stakes and Belmont Stakes winner, champion American 3-year-old
- Hansen: 2011 Breeders' Cup Juvenile winner
- Happy Knight: 1946 2000 Guineas Stakes winner
- Harbour Law: 2016 St Leger Stakes winner
- Hard Ridden: Winner of the Irish 2000 Guineas and Epsom Derby in 1958
- Harlan's Holiday: 3-time Grade 1 winner, then became a successful sire
- Harold: 1879 Preakness Stakes winner
- Harry Bassett: 1871 Belmont Stakes winner. Was the American champion 2-year-old, 3-year-old, and older colt in successive years.
- Haru Urara: Became known throughout Japan "the shining star of losers everywhere" (負け組の星, makegumi no hoshi) as she never won a single race in her career.
- Harvester: Tied for the 1884 Epsom Derby win in a dead-heat.
- Harzand: 2016 Epsom Derby and Irish Derby winner
- Hastings: 1896 Belmont Stakes winner. Sire of Fair Play, who in turn sired the great Man o' War, successful racehorse
- Hasty Road: 1954 Preakness Stakes winner
- Havre de Grace: 2011 American Horse of the Year
- Head Play: 1933 Preakness Stakes winner. Also finished second in a Kentucky Derby battle that saw both his and race winner Brokers Tip's jockeys fight so hard that both would be suspended from racing.
- Heart's Cry: Japanese horse who competed against undefeated 2004 Triple Crown winner Deep Impact before handing him his first defeat at the 2005 Arima Kinen; also a successful sire
- Heart to Heart: Canadian Hall of Fame horse that won multiple graded stakes, most notable the 2018 Gulfstream Park Turf Handicap
- Henbit: 1980 Epsom Derby winner
- Henry of Navarre: 1894 Belmont Stakes winner, American Horse of the Year in 1894 and 1895
- Henrythenavigator: 2008 2000 Guineas Stakes, Irish 2,000 Guineas, St James's Palace Stakes, and Sussex Stakes winner
- Hephestion: 1810 2000 Guineas Stakes winner
- Herringbone: 1943 1000 Guineas Stakes and St Leger Stakes winner
- Hethersett: 1962 St Leger Stakes winner
- Hidden Lake: Grade-1 winning filly, American best dirt female horse in 1997
- High Chaparral: Irish horse that won the Epsom Derby in 2002 and the Breeders' Cup Turf in 2002 and 2003 (dead heat with Johar in 2003). American champion male turf horse in 2002 and 2003
- High Echelon: 1970 Belmont Stakes winner
- High Gun: 1954 Belmont Stakes winner and American champion 3-year-old colt, American champion older colt for 1955
- High-Rise: 1998 Epsom Derby winner
- Highland Reel: Irish horse that won 7 group 1/grade 1 races. Holds record for most prize money earned by a European racehorse.
- High Quest: 1934 Preakness Stakes winner
- Hill Gail: 1952 Kentucky Derby winner
- Hill Prince: 1950 Preakness Stakes winner and American Horse of the Year, ranked in Top 100 American racehorses of the 20th Century
- Hindoo: 1881 Kentucky Derby winner and successful sire
- Hindus: 1900 Preakness Stakes winner
- His Eminence: 1901 Kentucky Derby winner
- Hishi Akebono: 1995 Sprinters Stakes winner, Japanese best sprinter or miler for 1995
- Hishi Amazon: Japanese mare known for her strong placements in many races, including several against colts, with victories in the 1993 Hanshin Sansai Himba Stakes and 1994 Queen Elizabeth II Commemorative Cup; winner of the JRA awards for best two-year-old and three-year-old fillies
- Hishi Miracle: Winner of the Kikuka Sho in 2002 and the Spring Tennō Shō (Spring) and Takarazuka Kinen in 2003
- Hokko Tarumae: Winner of the 2014 JRA Award for Best Dirt Horse
- Holiday: 1914 Preakness Stakes winner
- Hollandoise: 1778 St Leger Stakes winner
- Hollywood Wildcat: 1993 Breeders' Cup Distaff winner and American champion 3-year-old filly
- Honor A.P.: 2020 Santa Anita Derby winner
- Hoop Jr.: 1945 Kentucky Derby winner
- Horlicks: New Zealand Racing Hall of Fame inductee; first filly to win the Japan Cup, as well as the first horse from the Southern Hemisphere to win the race
- Hot Rod Charlie: 2021 Pennsylvania Derby winner
- Hourless: 1917 Belmont Stakes winner and co-champion American 3-year-old colt
- Humorist: 1921 Epsom Derby winner
- Hurricane Fly: Irish hurdler, winner of a record 22 Grade I races
- Hurryoff: 1933 Belmont Stakes winner
- Hyperion: Winner of the Epsom Derby and the St Leger Stakes; top sire for six years in the UK

=== I ===
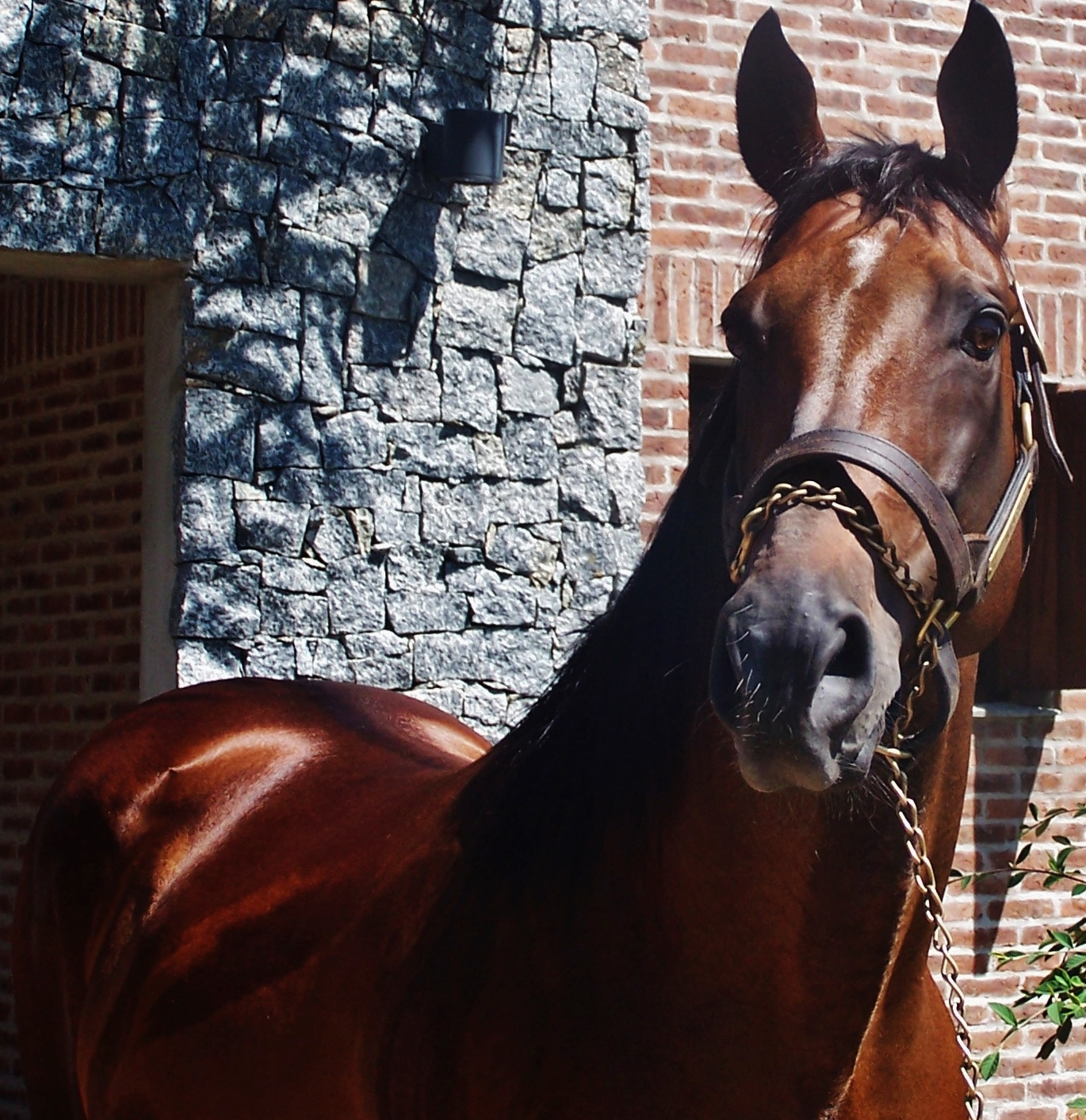
Invasor

- I'll Have Another: Winner of the 2012 Kentucky Derby and Preakness Stakes
- Ice Water: Multiple-race winning filly in Canadian graded stakes races
- Icecapade: American sprinter, better known as a successful sire
- Idiomatic: Multiple grade-1 winner, including 2023 Breeders' Cup Distaff
- Ildrim: 1900 Belmont Stakes winner
- Immortal Verse: Irish-bred French-trained filly that won the Coronation Stakes and Prix Jacques Le Marois in 2011. Later a successful broodmare
- Imperatrix: 1782 St Leger Stakes winner
- In the Wings: British-bred French-trained horse that won the Coronation Cup, Grand Prix de Saint-Cloud, and Breeders' Cup Turf in 1990
- Inari One: Japanese winner on both dirt and turf, with victories in the Tokyo Daishōten, Spring Tennō Shō, Takarazuka Kinen, and Arima Kinen
- Indian Blessing: 2007 Breeders' Cup Juvenile Fillies winner
- Indiana: 1964 St Leger Stakes winner
- Ines Fujin: Winner of the 1989 Asahi Hai Futurity Stakes and 1990 Tokyo Yūshun
- Informed Decision: 2009 Breeders' Cup Filly & Mare Sprint and American champion female sprint horse
- Inside Information: 1995 Breeders' Cup Distaff winner and American champion older mare
- Inspector B: 1886 Belmont Stakes winner
- Inspiral: British horse that won the Coronation Stakes in 2022, the Prix Jacques Le Marois in 2022 & 2023, and the Breeders' Cup Filly & Mare Turf in 2023
- Intercontinental: British-bred horse that won the Breeders' Cup Filly & Mare Turf in 2005
- Into Mischief: 7-time leading sire in North America
- Invasor: Winner of the Uruguayan Triple Crown, as well as the Dubai World Cup and Breeders' Cup Classic
- Ipi Tombe: Zimbabwean horse that won the Dubai Turf in 2003
- Iridessa: Irish horse that won the Matron Stakes and Breeders' Cup Filly & Mare Turf in 2019
- Irish War Cry: Graded-Stakes Winner, noted for his win in the Wood Memorial Stakes and for finishing second in the 2017 Belmont Stakes
- Iron Liege: 1957 Kentucky Derby winner
- Iroquois: First American-bred racehorse to win the Epsom Derby. Also won St Leger Stakes in 1881
- Is It True: 1988 Breeders' Cup Juvenile winner
- Isinglass: Sixth winner of the English Triple Crown (1893)
- Island Sands: 1999 2000 Guineas Stakes winner
- Islington: Irish-bred British-trained horse that won the Nassau Stakes in 2002, the Yorkshire Oaks in 2002 & 2003, and the Breeders' Cup Filly & Mare Turf in 2003
- Isonomy: Very successful racehorse and sire of The English Triple Crown winner Isinglass.
- Itsmyluckyday: Multiple graded stakes winner, finished second in the 2013 Preakness Stakes to Oxbow and won the Woodward Stakes in 2014.
- Izvestia: Ninth winner of the Canadian Triple Crown of Horse Racing (1990)

=== J ===
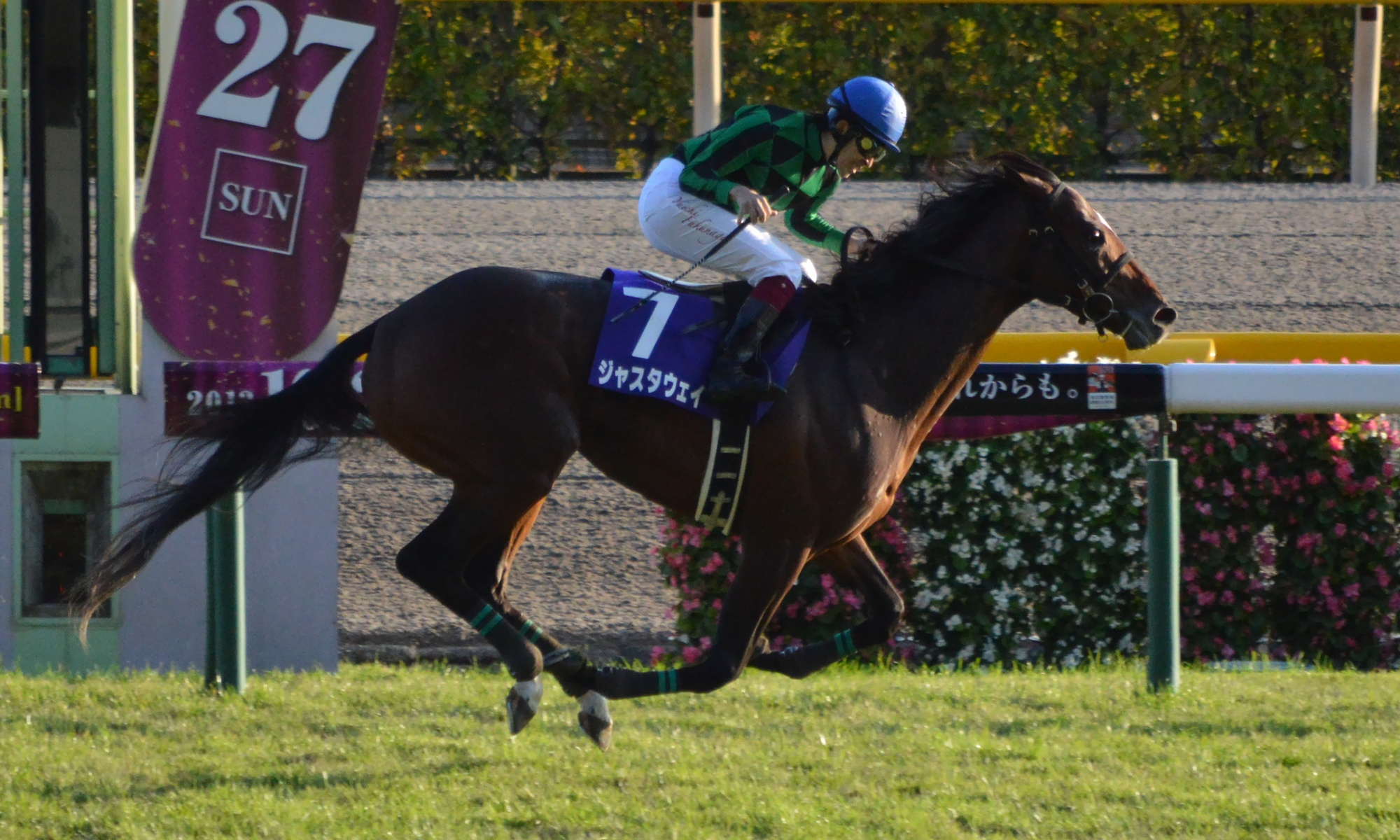
Just A Way

- Jaazeiro: Winner of the 1978 Irish 2,000 Guineas, St James's Palace Stakes, and Sussex Stakes
- Jack d'Or: 2023 Ōsaka Hai winner
- Jack Hare Jr.: 1918 Preakness Stakes winner
- Jack Spigot: 1821 St Leger Stakes winner
- Jacobus: 1883 Preakness Stakes winner
- Jaipur: 1962 Belmont Stakes winner and American champion 3-year-old colt
- Jannette: 1878 Epsom Oaks, Yorkshire Oaks, and St Leger Stakes winner
- Jantar Mantar: Winner of the 2023 Asahi Hai Futurity Stakes, the 2024 NHK Mile Cup, and the 2025 Yasuda Kinen and Mile Championship; current record-holder for the Mile Championship
- Jay Trump: Three-time winner of the Maryland Hunt Cup and the Grand National
- Jaywalk: 2018 Breeders' Cup Juvenile Fillies winner
- Jazil: 2006 Belmont Stakes winner
- Jean Bereaud: 1899 Belmont Stakes winner, American champion 2-year-old colt in 1898
- Jeddah: 1898 Epsom Derby winner
- Jerry: 1824 St Leger Stakes winner
- Jet Pilot: 1947 Kentucky Derby winner
- Jewel Princess: 1996 Breeders' Cup Distaff winner and American champion older mare
- Jim and Tonic: Most successful French racehorse by prize earnings. Winner of the Hong Kong Cup, Hong Kong Mile, Queen Elizabeth II Cup, and Dubai Turf
- Jim French: Contender for American Triple Crown races in 1971
- Joe Cotton: 1885 Kentucky Derby winner
- Joe Daniels: 1872 Belmont Stakes winner
- Johannesburg: Multiple group-1 winner, including the 2001 Breeders' Cup Juvenile. Champion 2-year-old in both American and Europe
- Johar: Co-won the 2003 Breeders' Cup Turf in a dead heat with High Chaparral.
- John Bull: 1792 Epsom Derby winner
- John Henry: U.S. Champion Turf Horse (1980, 1981, 1983, 1984)
- Johnstown: Winner of the 1939 Kentucky Derby and Belmont Stakes
- Johren: 1918 Belmont Stakes winner
- Journalism: 2025 Santa Anita Derby, Preakness Stakes, and Haskell Stakes winner
- Judge Himes: 1903 Kentucky Derby winner
- Judy the Beauty: 2014 Breeders' Cup Filly & Mare Sprint winner
- Julio Mariner: 1978 St Leger Stakes winner
- Jungle Pocket: 2001 winner of the Japanese Derby and Japan Cup, sire of Tosen Jordan
- Juryoku Pierrot: 2026 Yushun Himba winner
- Justify: 2018 winner of the U.S. Triple Crown
- Justin Palace: 2023 Spring Tenno Sho winner
- Just A Way: Won the Dubai Duty Free in 2014 at a record time still undefeated as of 2023, becoming the best rated horse that year as a result.
- Just F Y I: 2023 Breeders' Cup Juvenile Fillies winner

=== K ===
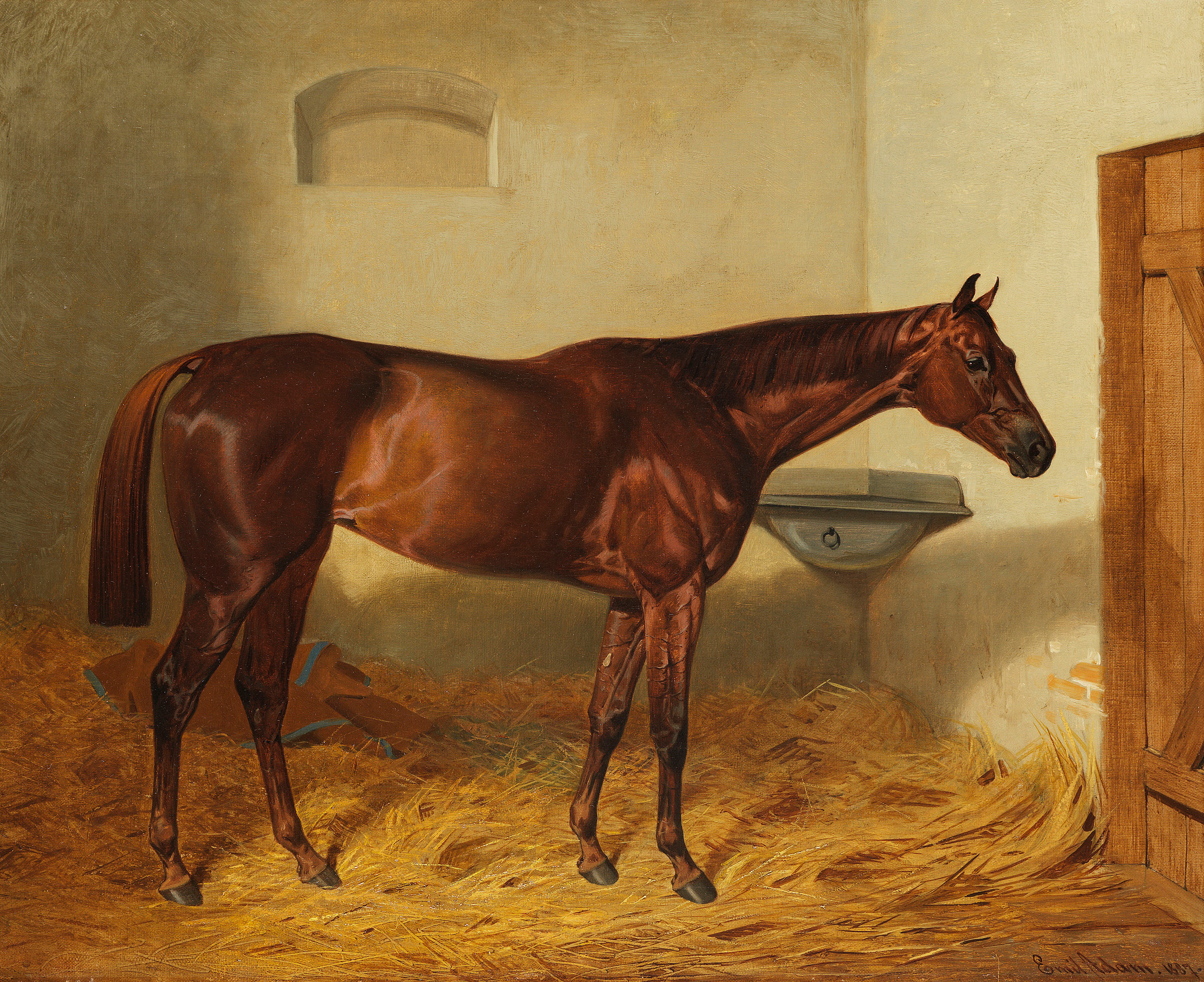
Kincsem

- Kahyasi: Irish-bred British-trained horse that won the Epsom Derby and Irish Derby in 1988
- Kalamoun: British-bred French-trained horse with multiple Group One wins in France, later became a successful sire
- Kalanisi: Irish-bred horse that won the Champion Stakes and Breeders' Cup Turf in 2000, named American champion male turf horse and European champion older horse
- Kalitan: 1917 Preakness Stakes winner
- Kameko: 2020 2000 Guineas Stakes winner
- Karakontie: Japanese-bred French-trained horse that won the Poule d'Essai des Poulains and Breeders' Cup Mile in 2014
- Kashmir: 1966 2000 Guineas Stakes winner
- Katsuragi Ace: First Japanese-trained horse to win the Japan Cup (1984), handed Triple Crown winner Symboli Rudolf his first ever loss
- Kauai King: 1966 Kentucky Derby and Preakness Stakes winner, Maryland-bred horse of the year
- Kauto Star: Record five-time winner of the King George VI Chase
- Kawakami Princess: 2006 Yushun Himba and Shūka Shō winner. JRA Award for Best Three-Year-Old Filly in 2006
- Keen Ice: 2015 Travers Stakes winner
- Kelso: Only five-time U.S. Horse of the Year, in the list of the top 100 U.S. thoroughbred champions of the 20th Century by The Blood-Horse magazine, Kelso ranks 4th
- Kennymore: 1914 2000 Guineas Stakes winner
- Kettledrum: 1861 Epsom Derby winner
- Kew Gardens: 2018 Grand Prix de Paris and St Leger Stakes winner
- Keysoe: 1919 Nassau Stakes and St Leger Stakes winner
- Ki Ming: 1951 2000 Guineas Stakes winner
- Kilwarlin: 1887 St Leger Stakes winner
- Kincsem: Hungarian race mare and most successful racehorse ever, winning all 54 starts in five countries
- Kindergarten: Weighted more than Phar Lap in the Melbourne Cup
- King Argentin: Indonesia Triple Crown Winner (2025), the fourth Triple Crown Winner in Indonesia
- King Halo: Japanese racehorse who won the 2000 Takamatsunomiya Kinen
- King Kamehameha: Successful race horse and sire in Japan.
- King of Kings: 1998 2000 Guineas Stakes winner
- King's Best: 2000 2000 Guineas Stakes winner
- Kingcraft: 1870 Epsom Derby winner
- Kingfisher: 1870 Belmont Stakes winner
- Kingman: 1891 Kentucky Derby winner
- Kingsbarns (Ireland): Irish-bred horse, 2012 Racing Post Trophy winner
- Kingsbarns (US): US-bred horse, winner of the Stephen Foster Stakes in 2024
- Kingston: All-time record holder of the most wins by a horse with 89
- Kingston Hill: 2014 St Leger Stakes winner. Cartier Champion Two-year-old Colt in 2013.
- Kingston Town: Won three Cox Plates; first Australian horse to top $1million in stakes earnings
- Kingsway: 1943 2000 Guineas Stakes winner
- Kip Deville: 2007 Breeders' Cup Mile winner. Oklahoma-bred horse of the year in 2007 and 2008
- Kirkconnel: 1895 2000 Guineas Stakes winner
- Kisber: Hungarian-bred British-trained horse that won the 1876 Epsom Derby and Grand Prix de Paris winner. Later a leading sire in Germany
- Kiseki: 2017 Kikuka-shō winner
- Kissin George: One of America's premier sprinting Thoroughbred racehorses
- Kitasan Black: Won 7 Grade 1 races in Japan including the Kikuka Sho, Tenno Sho (Spring) twice, and Tenno Sho (Autumn), owned by famous enka singer Saburo Kitajima; sire of Equinox and Croix du Nord
- Knicks Go: 2021 American Horse of the Year
- Knight of Ellerslie: 1884 Preakness Stakes winner
- Known Fact: 1980 2000 Guineas Stakes and Queen Elizabeth II Stakes winner
- Kona Gold: 2000 Breeders' Cup Sprint winner, American champion sprint horse
- Kotashaan: French-bred horse that won the 1993 Breeders' Cup Turf and was named American Horse of the Year
- Ksar: Two time winner of the Prix de l'Arc de Triomphe, among numerous other grade 1 victories, leading sire in France
- Kris Kin: 2003 Epsom Derby winner
- Kurifuji: JRA Hall of Fame horse that won the 1943 Tōkyō Yūshun, Yushun Himba, and Kikuka-shō.
- Kurofune: Winner of the 2001 NHK Mile Cup and Japan Cup Dirt
- Kyoei March: Winner of the 1997 Oka Shō, maternal grandmother of Marche Lorraine.

=== L ===
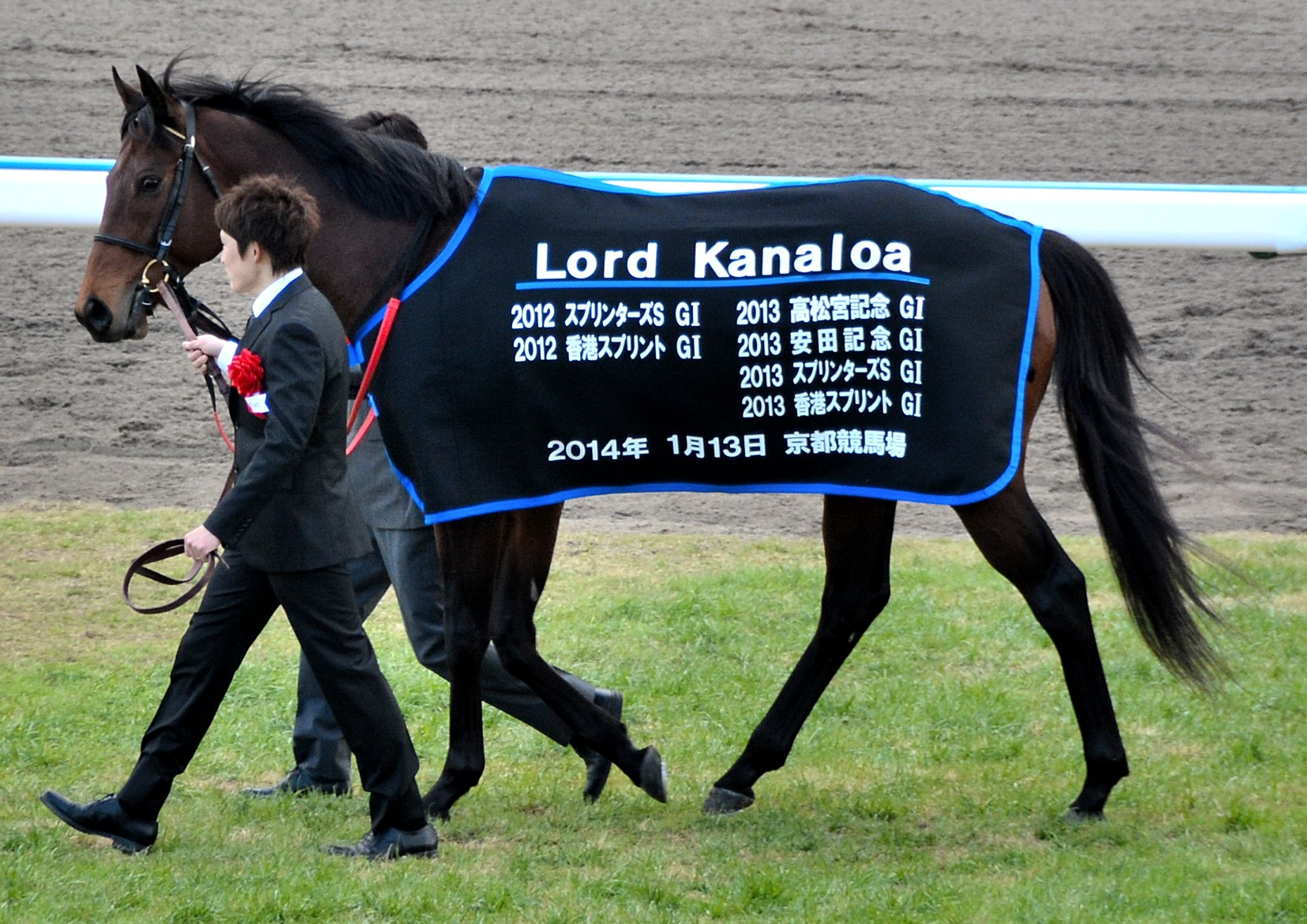
Lord Kanaloa

- La Fleche: Winner of the British Fillies' Triple Crown in 1892. Later an influential broodmare.
- La Troienne: Most important broodmare of the twentieth century
- Ladas: Winner of the 1894 2000 Guineas Stakes and Epsom Derby. Owner by British Prime Minister Lord Roseberry
- Lady Aria: 2018 Indonesia Derby Winner
- Lady Arion: Daughter of Lady Aria
- Lady Centavo: 1996 Indonesia Derby Winner
- Lady's Secret: 1986 Breeders' Cup Distaff winner and American Horse of the Year
- Lambert Simnel: 1941 2000 Guineas Stakes winner
- Lambourn: 2025 Epsom Derby and Irish Derby winner
- Lammtarra: American-bred British-trained horse that won the Epsom Derby and the Prix de l'Arc de Triomphe in 1995
- Lap-dog: 1826 Epsom Derby winner
- Larkspur: Irish horse that won the 1962 Epsom Derby
- Lashkari: British-bred horse that won the inaugural Breeders' Cup Turf in 1984
- Last Tycoon: Irish-bred French-trained horse that won the Breeders' Cup Mile in 1986. Later a leading sire in Australia
- Launcelot: 1840 St Leger Stakes winner
- Lavandin: 1956 Epsom Derby winner
- Lawrin: 1938 Kentucky Derby winner
- Layminster: 1910 Preakness Stakes winner
- Le Ksar: 1937 2000 Guineas Stakes winner
- Leading Light: 2013 St Leger Stakes and 2014 Ascot Gold Cup winner. Cartier Champion Stayer in 2014
- Legacy World: 1993 Japan Cup winner
- Lei Papale: 2021 Ōsaka Hai winner
- Lemberg: Winner of numerous major British stakes races, most notably the 1910 Epsom Derby
- Lemon Drop Kid: 1999 Belmont Stakes winner
- Leo Durban: Winner of the 1991 Kikuka-shō
- Leonatus: 1883 Kentucky Derby winner
- Lexington: America's leading 19th-century sire
- Liam's Map: 2015 Breeders' Cup Dirt Mile winner
- Liberty Island: 2023 Japanese Triple Tiara winner
- Lieut. Gibson: 1900 Kentucky Derby winner
- Life Is Good: Multiple Grade-I winner, including Breeders' Cup Dirt Mile in 2021 and Pegasus World Cup in 2022
- Life Is Sweet: 2009 Breeders' Cup Distaff winner
- Life's Magic: 1985 Breeders' Cup Distaff winner, 2-time Eclipse Award winner
- Light Cavalry: 1980 St Leger Stakes winner
- Lil E. Tee: 1992 Kentucky Derby winner
- Lit de Justice: 1996 Breeders' Cup Sprint winner, American champion sprint horse
- Little Current: 1974 Preakness Stakes and Belmont Stakes winner, American champion 3-year-old
- Little Mike: 2012 Breeders' Cup Turf winner and Florida-bred horse of the year
- Little Wonder: 1840 Epsom Derby winner
- Logician: 2019 St Leger Stakes winner
- Lomond: 1983 2000 Guineas Stakes winner
- Lonesome Glory: Only five-time winner of American champion steeplechaser
- Longfellow: 19th-century runner and stallion
- Lookin At Lucky: Winner of 2010 Preakness Stakes, sired Accelerate and Kentucky Derby winner Country House
- Lookout: 1893 Kentucky Derby winner
- Lord Clifden: 1863 St. Leger Stakes winner, champion sire in Germany (1872) and Britain & Ireland
- Lord Kanaloa: Two time winner of both the Sprinters Stakes in Japan and the Hong Kong Sprint (1876)
- Lord Lyon: Third horse to win the English Triple Crown (1866)
- Lord Murphy: 1879 Kentucky Derby winner
- Lottery: Winner of the Grand National steeplechase in 1839
- Louis Quatorze: 1996 Preakness Stakes winner
- Lounger: 1797 St Leger Stakes winner
- Louvois: 1913 2000 Guineas Stakes and Prince of Wales's Stakes winner
- Loves Only You: Undefeated winner of the 2019 Yushun Himba and current record-holder for the race, who went on to win the Queen Elizabeth II Cup in Hong Kong, the Breeders' Cup Filly & Mare Turf in the United States, and the Hong Kong Cup, all in 2021
- Lucarno: 2007 St Leger Stakes winner
- Lucency: American-bred, Filipino-trained horse that beat the record for 1300m and 1650m at The Horsemen's Track.
- Lucky Debonair: 1965 Kentucky Derby winner
- Lucky Lilac: Japanese mare who won the Japan-based Queen Elizabeth II Cup twice and, as a five-year-old, defeated male opponents to win the Ōsaka Hai
- Luke McLuke: 1914 Belmont Stakes winner
- Lure: Winner of the Breeders' Cup Mile in 1992 and 1993. Ranked a Top 100 American racehorse of the 20th Century
- Luthier: 1968 Prix Jacques Le Marois and Prix Lupin winner. Later become one of the leading sires in France, producing over 90 graded stakes winners
- Lyana Nagari: 2022 Indonesia Derby Winner
- Lyphard, American-bred French-trained horse, winner of the Prix Jacques Le Marois, later became a significant sire in both countries
- Lys Gracieux: 2019 Japanese Horse of the Year

=== M ===
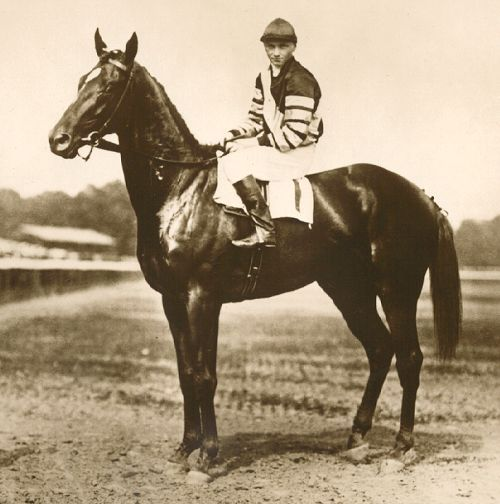
Man o' War

- Macaroni: 1863 2000 Guineas Stakes and Epsom Derby winner
- Macbeth II: 1888 Kentucky Derby winner
- Macho Uno: 2000 Breeders' Cup Juvenile winner and successful sire
- Mad Play: 1924 Belmont Stakes winner
- Mage: 2023 Kentucky Derby winner
- Magician: Irish-bred horse that won the Irish 2,000 Guineas and the Breeders' Cup Turf in 2013. Cartier Champion Three-year-old Colt for 2013
- Magna Grecia: 2019 2000 Guineas Stakes winner
- Mahmoud: French-bred British-trained racehorse, winner of the Epsom Derby in 1936. Became a prominent sire in North America after racing
- Mahubah: Dam of Man o' War
- Main Sequence: 2014 Breeders' Cup Turf winner
- Majestic Prince: 1969 Kentucky Derby and Preakness Stakes winner, listed at #46 of Top 100 American racehorses of the 20th Century
- Makahiki: Winner of the 2016 Tokyo Yūshun
- Makfi: Winner of the 2010 2000 Guineas Stakes and Prix Jacques Le Marois
- Makybe Diva: Won the Melbourne Cup on three occasions
- Malathaat: American Champion Three-Year-Old Filly, American Champion Older Dirt Female Horse and winner of the Ashland Stakes, Kentucky Oaks and Alabama Stakes.
- Man o' War: Often considered America's greatest racehorse; won 20 of 21 career starts
- Man of Iron: Winner of the 2009 Breeders' Cup Marathon
- Mandaloun: 2021 Kentucky Derby winner
- Mango: 1837 St Leger Stakes winner
- Manhattan Cafe: Winner of the 2001 Kikuka-sho and Arima Kinen and the 2002 Tennō Shō (Spring), later a leading sire in Japan
- Manila: 1986 Breeders' Cup Turf winner and American champion male turf horse
- Manna: 1925 2000 Guineas Stakes and Epsom Derby winner
- Manuel (Australia): Winner of the C F Orr Stakes in 2019
- Manuel (US): Winner of the 1899 Kentucky Derby
- Mameluke (UK): 1827 Epsom Derby winner
- Mameluke (US): 1951 Blue Grass Stakes winner
- Marche Lorraine: Japanese-bred horse that won the 2021 Breeders' Cup Distaff
- Margrave (UK): British horse that won the 1832 St Leger Stakes
- Margrave (US): American horse that won the 1896 Preakness Stakes
- Marialite: Winner of the 2015 Queen Elizabeth II Cup and 2016 Takarazuka Kinen
- Mark of Esteem: 1996 2000 Guineas Stakes winner
- Martial: 1960 2000 Guineas Stakes winner
- Maruzensky: Undefeated Japanese racehorse and successful sire
- Marvelous Sunday: 1997 Ōsaka Hai and Takarazuka Kinen winner
- Maryfield: Canadian horse that won the 2007 Breeders' Cup Filly & Mare Sprint
- Masar: 2018 Epsom derby winner
- Masked Marvel: 2011 St Leger Stakes winner
- Master Charlie: winner of the 1924 Remsen Stakes, Tijuana Futurity, Hopeful Stakes, Kentucky Jockey Club Stakes; awarded 1924 American Champion Two-Year-Old-Male/Colt
- Master Derby: 1975 Preakness Stakes winner, later a leading broodmare sire in Britain and Ireland
- Master of The Seas: Multiple grade-1 winning Irish horse that won the Woodbine Mile and the Breeders' Cup Mile in 2023
- Masterman: 1902 Belmont Stakes winner
- Mastery: 2009 St Leger Stakes and 2010 Hong Kong Vase winner.
- Mate: 1931 Preakness Stakes winner
- Matikanefukukitaru: 1997 Kikuka Sho winner
- Matikanetannhauser: 1993 Meguro Kinen winner
- Matilda: 1827 St Leger Stakes winner
- Maurice: 2015 Japanese Horse of the Year and recipient of the JRA Award for Best Sprinter or Miler, also in 2015
- Maximum Security: Winner of Kentucky Derby 2019 before disqualification from 1st place for disturbing other horses
- Mayano Top Gun: 1995 Japanese Horse of the Year, winner of the Arima Kinen, Kikuka Sho, Takarazuka Kinen, and Tenno Sho (Spring)
- Medina Spirit: Finished first in 2021 Kentucky Derby before later being disqualified for illegal drug usage. The incident resulted in major controversy for his trainer Bob Baffert, that led to his horses being banned from Churchill Downs until 2024.
- Meadow Star: 1990 Breeders' Cup Juvenile Fillies and 1991 Acorn Stakes winner
- Medaglia d'Oro: 2002 Travers Stakes and 2003 Whitney Handicap winner. Major sire after racing.
- Meisho Doto: Came second to his rival T. M. Opera O in five consecutive G1 races before defeating him in the 2001 Takarazuka Kinen
- Meisho Samson: Winner of the 2007 Spring and Autumn Tennō Shō
- Meisho Tabaru: Winner of the 2025 and 2026 Takarazuka Kinen
- Mejiro Ardan: 1989 Takamatsunomiya Hai winner
- Mejiro Bright: 1998 Spring Tennō Shō winner
- Mejiro Dober: 1996 Yushun Himba and Shūka Shō winner, 1998 & 1999 Queen Elizabeth II Cup winner
- Mejiro McQueen: Two-time winner of the Tenno Sho (spring), among other Grade 1 victories
- Mejiro Palmer: Fifth horse in history to win the Takarazuka Kinen and Arima Kinen in the same racing season (1992)
- Mejiro Ramonu: First Triple Tiara winner of Japan
- Mejiro Ryan: 1991 Takarazuka Kinen winner
- Meld: Winner of the English Fillies' Triple Crown in 1955
- Melton: 1885 Epsom Derby and St Leger Stakes winner
- Memnon: 1825 St Leger Stakes and 1827 Ascot Gold Cup winner
- Memoir: 1890 Epsom Oaks and St Leger Stakes winner
- Mendelssohn: Winner of the 2017 Breeders' Cup Juvenile Turf and the 2018 UAE Derby
- Meridian: 1911 Kentucky Derby winner, retroactively named 1911 American Horse of the Year
- Merry Hampton: 1887 Epsom Derby winner
- Meteor: 1842 2000 Guineas Stakes winner
- Michelozzo: 1989 St Leger Stakes winner
- Mid-day Sun: 1937 Epsom Derby winner
- Midday: British horse that won the Nassau Stakes a record three times (2009–2011). Also won Yorkshire Oaks, Prix Vermeille, and Breeders' Cup Filly & Mare Turf
- Middleground: 1950 Kentucky Derby and Belmont Stakes winner, American Horse of the Year
- Middleton: 1825 Epsom Derby winner
- Midnight Lute: Two-time winner of the Breeders' Cup Sprint, American champion sprint horse in 2007
- Midshipman: 2008 Breeders' Cup Juvenile winner
- Miesque: American filly with 10 total Grade I wins in Britain, France, and America, including the 1000 Guineas Stakes (1987), Poule d'Essai des Pouliches (1987), and the Breeders' Cup Mile (1987 & 1988). Ranked a Top 100 American racehorse of the 20th Century
- Miesque's Approval: 2006 Breeders' Cup Mile winner and American champion male turf horse
- Might and Power: World Champion Stayer (1997); Australian Horse of the Year (1998, 1999)
- Miho Shinzan: 1985 Kikuka-shō and 1987 Spring Tennō Shō winner
- Mihono Bourbon: Japanese Triple Crown contender, winning the 1992 Satsuki Shō and Tokyo Yūshun while undefeated and finishing second in the Kikuka-shō
- Mikki Queen: 2015 Japanese Double Tiara winner
- Milan: 2001 St Leger Stakes winner
- Mill George: Successful sire, particularly in Japan
- Mill Reef: American-bred British-trained racehorse, winner of the Epsom Derby and Prix de l'Arc de Triomphe in 1971. Considered one of the greatest racehorses to run in Europe post-World War II
- Millenary: Winner of the 2000 St Leger Stakes and 2004 Jockey Club Cup
- Milord: Indonesian racehorse
- Mine That Bird: 2009 Kentucky Derby winner
- Minnie Hauk: 2025 Epsom Oaks and Yorkshire Oaks winner
- Minoru: 1909 2000 Guineas Stakes and Epsom Derby winner
- Minster Son: 1988 St Leger Stakes winner
- Miss Alleged: American-bred French-trained horse that won the 1991 Breeders' Cup Turf, first of only two fillies to win the event
- Miss Disco: American sprinter racehorse, later became known as the dam of Bold Ruler
- Mister Baileys: 1994 2000 Guineas Stakes winner
- Mitole: Churchill Downs Stakes and Breeders' Cup Sprint winner in 2019, American champion sprint horse
- Mizdirection: Winner of the Breeders' Cup Turf Sprint in 2012 and 2013
- Mo Donegal: 2022 Belmont Stakes winner
- Modern Games: Irish-bred British-trained horse that won the 2021 Breeders' Cup Juvenile Turf and 2022 Poule d'Essai des Poulains and Breeders' Cup Mile. 2022 American champion male turf horse
- Moifaa: First New Zealand horse to win the Grand National
- Moira: Canadian-bred horse that won the Queen's Plate in 2022 and Breeders' Cup Filly & Mare Turf in 2024. Canadian Horse of the Year in 2022
- Mon Fils: 1973 2000 Guineas Stakes winner
- Mon Talisman: Winner of the Prix de l'Arc de Triomphe and French Derby
- Monarchos: 2001 Kentucky Derby winner, second Kentucky Derby winner with a time under two minutes
- Monomoy Girl: 2018 and 2020 Breeders' Cup Distaff winner, American champion 3-year old filly in 2018, and champion older mare in 2020
- Montague: 1890 Preakness Stakes winner
- Montjeu: Irish-bred French-trained horse that won the Irish Derby and Prix de l'Arc de Triomphe in 1999. Later a top sire in Europe producing numerous graded stakes winners
- Montrose: 1887 Kentucky Derby winner
- Moon Madness: Winner of the 1986 St Leger Stakes and 1987 Grand Prix de Saint-Cloud
- Moonax: 1994 St Leger Stakes and Prix Royal-Oak winner. European Champion Stayer for 1994
- Morston: 1973 Epsom Derby winner
- Morvich: 1922 Kentucky Derby winner
- Moses: 1822 Epsom Derby winner
- Motivator: 2005 Epsom Derby winner
- Mr. C. B.: Japanese Triple Crown winner and 1983 Japanese Horse of the Year; inducted into the Japan Racing Association Hall of Fame in 1986
- Mr Jinks: 1929 2000 Guineas Stakes and St James's Palace Stakes winner
- Mr. Prospector: One of the most successful U.S. sires of the late 20th century
- Mucho Macho Man: 2013 Awesome Again Stakes and Breeders' Cup Classic winner
- Mundig: 1835 Epsom Derby winner
- Museum Mile: winner of the 2025 Satsuki Shō and Arima Kinen and recipient of the 2025 JRA Award for Best Three-Year-Old Colt
- Musical Romance: 2011 Breeders' Cup Filly & Mare Sprint and American champion female sprint horse
- Musjid: 1859 Epsom Derby winner
- Mutafaweq: Winner of the 1999 St Leger Stakes, 2000 Deutschland-Preis and Canadian International Stakes, and 2001 Coronation Cup
- Muth: 2024 Arkansas Derby winner
- My Babu: 1948 2000 Guineas Stakes winner, later became major sire of eventing and show jumping horses
- My Flag: 1995 Breeders' Cup Juvenile Fillies and 1996 Coaching Club American Oaks winner
- My Love: French-trained horse that won the 1948 Epsom Derby and Grand Prix de Paris winner
- My Miss Aurelia: 2011 Breeders' Cup Juvenile Fillies winner
- Mystere: Indonesia Triple Crown Winner (1978), first Triple Crown Winner in Indonesia
- Mystik Dan: Winner of the 2024 Kentucky Derby
- Mystiko: 1991 2000 Guineas Stakes and Challenge Stakes winner

=== N ===
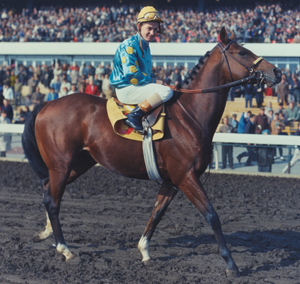
Northern Dancer

- Naga Sembilan: 2025 Indonesian Star of Stars and 2024 Piala Raja Hamengku Buwono X winner
- Nakayama Festa: 2010 Takarazuka Kinen winner
- Napoleon Solo, 2026 Preakness Stakes winner
- Narita Brian: 1994 Japanese Triple Crown winner
- Narita Taishin: 1993 Satsuki Shō winner
- Narita Top Road: Winner of the 1999 Kikuka-shō.
- Nashua: 1955 Preakness Stakes and Belmont Stakes winner, best known for a match race against Swaps. American Horse of the Year in 1955
- Nashwan: 1989 2000 Guineas Stakes and Epsom Derby winner
- Nasrullah: One of the most successful Thoroughbred sires of the 20th century, grandsire to Secretariat
- Natalma: Major broodmare, best known as the dam of Northern Dancer
- National Treasure: 2023 Preakness Stakes winner
- Native Dancer (also nicknamed the Gray Ghost): Won 21 of 22 career races, with only loss in the Kentucky Derby; sire whose descendants have come to dominate modern American Triple Crown racing
- Nearco: Italian bred Thoroughbred racehorse. ''Thoroughbred Heritage'' described him as "one of the greatest racehorses of the Twentieth Century" and "one of the most important sires of the century." He was undefeated and his sire line was dominant.
- Nearctic: Canadian Horse of the Year in 1958, later became major sire, most notably of Northern Dancer
- Nearula: 1953 2000 Guineas Stakes, St James's Palace Stakes, and Champion Stakes winner
- Nebbiolo: 1977 2000 Guineas Stakes winner
- Nedawi: 1998 St Leger Stakes winner
- Needles: The first Florida-bred horse to win the Kentucky Derby (1956), also won the Belmont Stakes
- Nefertiti: 1999 Indonesia Derby Winner
- Neil Gow: 1910 2000 Guineas Stakes and Eclipse Stakes winner
- Nellie Morse: 1924 Preakness Stakes winner and influential broodmare
- Neo Universe: Winner of the 2003 Satsuki Shō and Tokyo Yūshun, as well as the 2004 Osaka Hai; sire of Victoire Pisa
- Nest: Multiple Grade 1 events winner, American champion 3-year-old filly for 2022
- Never Bend: American champion two-year-old in 1962, later became a leading sire in Great Britain
- Never Say Die: 1954 Epsom Derby and St Leger Stakes winner. Leading sire in Britain and Ireland in 1962
- New Approach: 2008 Epsom Derby, Irish Champion Stakes, and Champion Stakes winner
- New Year's Day: 2013 Breeders' Cup Juvenile winner
- Newminster: 1851 St Leger Stakes winner
- Niatross: Pacer who won 37 of his 39 races and broke many records, considered to be one of the greatest harness racers of all time
- Nice Nature: Nicknamed "The Bronze Collector", Nice Nature became known for finishing third in the Arima Kinen for 3 years in a row, and post-retirement became the focus of a donation drive to help retired horses like himself
- Night Hawk: 1913 St Leger Stakes winner
- Night of Thunder: 2014 2000 Guineas Stakes winner
- Night Raid: Sire of Phar Lap
- Nijinsky: Last horse to win the English Triple Crown (1970)
- Niksar: 1965 2000 Guineas Stakes winner
- Nimbus (France): Winner of the Prix de Sablons, Prix Biennal, and Prix du Cadran in 1914.
- Nimbus (UK): 1949 2000 Guineas Stakes and Epsom Derby winner
- Ninety-three: 1793 St Leger Stakes winner
- Nishino Flower: Winner of the 1991 Hanshin Sansai Himba Stakes, 1992 Oka Sho, and 1992 Sprinters Stakes
- Nitrogen: Multiple grade-I stakes winner, including 2025 Alabama Stakes and 2026 Breeders' Cup Distaff
- Noble: 1786 Epsom Derby winner
- Nonoalco, 1974 2000 Guineas Stakes winner
- Norman: 1908 2000 Guineas Stakes winner
- North Flight: Japanese racehorse with 8 wins in 11 starts, including the 1994 Yasuda Kinen and Mile Championship
- North Light: 2004 Epsom Derby winner
- Northern Dancer: Canada's champion on the racetrack; most successful sire of the 20th century
- Northern Queen: 1965 Canadian Oaks winner
- Northern Spur: Irish-bred horse that won the 1995 Breeders' Cup Turf and was named American champion male turf horse
- Northern Taste: Winner of the 1974 Prix de la Forêt and one of the most successful leading sires in Japanese history
- Notable Speech: British horse with multiple Group 1 wins, including the 2000 Guineas Stakes in 2024 and the Breeders' Cup Mile in 2025
- Nownownow: Winner of the inaugural Breeders' Cup Juvenile Turf in 2007
- Nysos: Breeders' Cup Dirt Mile winner in 2025
- Nyquist: 2016 Kentucky Derby winner

=== O ===
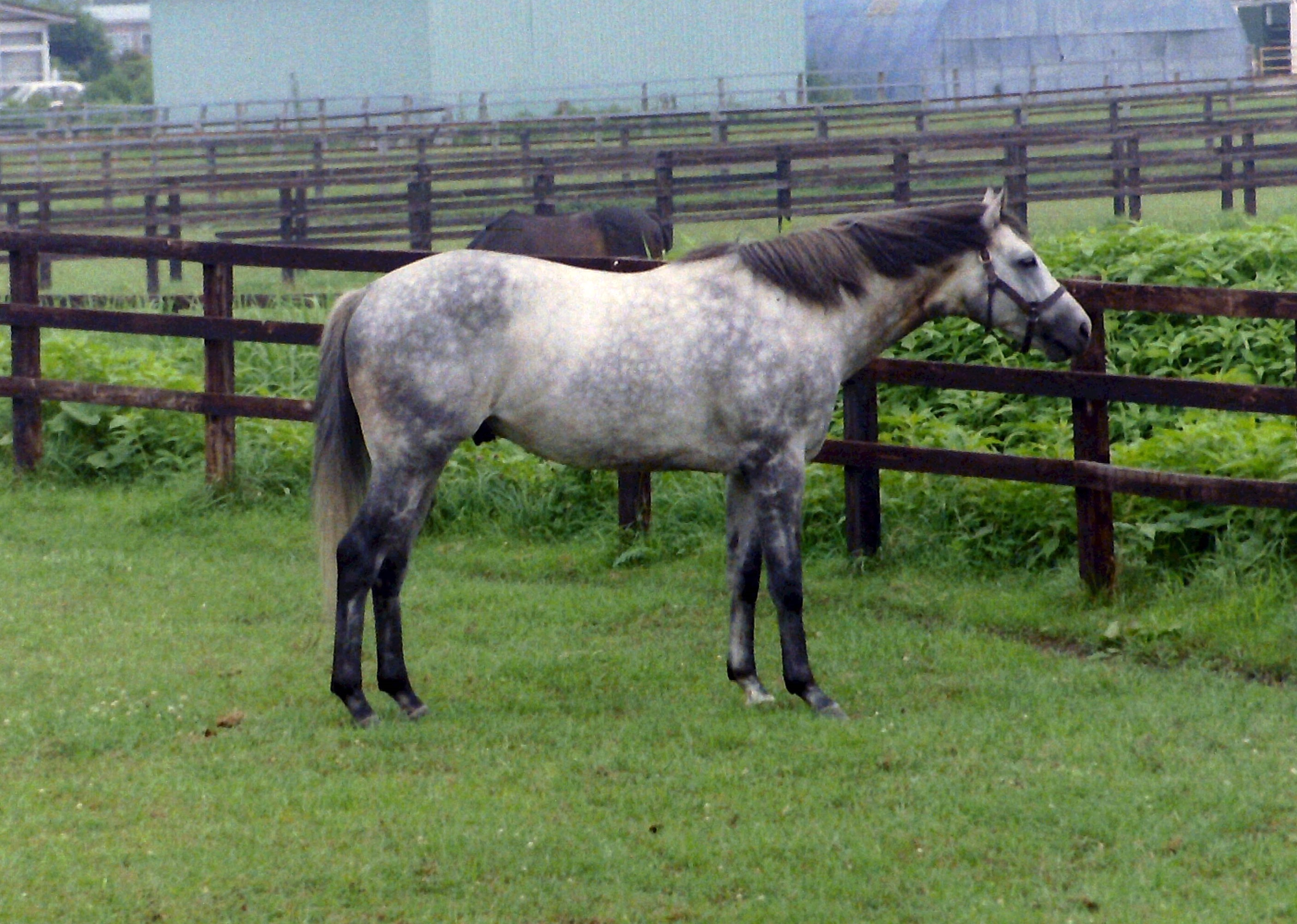
Oguri Cap

- Oath: 1999 Epsom Derby winner
- Ocean Swell: Winner of the 1944 Epsom Derby and Jockey Club Cup, and the 1945 Ascot Gold Cup
- Octavian: 1810 St Leger Stakes winner
- Octavius: 1812 Epsom Derby winner
- Oedipus: Winner of the American Steeplechase triple crown
- Oguri Cap: JRA Hall of Fame inductee; winner of many Grade 1 races and ushered in an era of heightened popularity of the sport during his racing career
- Oh So Sharp: Winner of the English Fillies' Triple Crown in 1985
- Oju Chosan: JRA Hall of Fame inductee; steeplechase race horse who won 9 JG1 races, most notably winning the Nakayama Grand Jump five times in a row.
- Oken Bruce Lee: 2008 Kikuka-shō winner
- Old England: 1902 Preakness Stakes winner
- Old Rosebud: 1914 Kentucky Derby winner and a top 100 American racehosrse of the 20th Century. Raced for 10 years and won 40 races in 80 starts before a fatal injury in his last race.
- Omaha: Third horse to win the American Triple Crown (1935), #61 on list of Top 100 racehorses of 20th Century
- Omar Khayyam: British-born racehorse that won the 1917 Kentucky Derby, the first foreign-born horse to win the race. Named after Persian mathematician, poet, and astronomer Omar Khayyam.
- Omphale: 1784 St Leger Stakes winner
- One Count: 1952 Belmont Stakes winner, 1952 American Horse of the Year
- One Dreamer: 1994 Breeders' Cup Distaff winner
- Open Mind: Breeders' Cup Juvenile Fillies winner in 1988 and Kentucky Oaks winner in 1989. Won the American Triple Tiara in 1989. Champion American filly as a two and three year old.
- Opening Verse: 1991 Breeders' Cup Mile winner
- Opera House: British racehorse who sired T. M. Opera O
- Orb: 2013 Kentucky Derby winner
- Orby: 1907 Epsom Derby and Irish Derby winner
- Order of Australia: Irish horse that won the Breeders' Cup Mile in 2020
- Orfevre: 2011 Japanese Triple Crown winner, and is one of the highest earning racehorses ever valued almost 20 million US dollars, sire of Juryoku Pierrot, Lucky Lilac, and Marche Lorraine
- Orientate: 2002 Breeders' Cup Sprint winner, American champion sprint horse
- Orlando: 1844 Epsom Derby
- Ormonde: Undefeated horse that was the 4th English Triple Crown winner (1886)
- Orville: 1802 St Leger Stakes winner. Later a leading sire in Britain and Ireland.
- Orwell: 1932 2000 Guineas Stakes winner
- Oscar Performance: Winner of the 2016 Breeders' Cup Juvenile Turf, the Belmont Derby in 2017, and the Woodbine Mile in 2018
- Ossian: 1883 Sussex Stakes and St Leger Stakes winner
- Otterington: 1812 St Leger Stakes winner
- Ouija Board: British horse that won multiple Group One races, including the 2004 Epsom Oaks and Irish Oaks, and 2004 & 2006 Breeders' Cup Filly & Mare Turf. European Horse of the Year in 2004 and 2006
- Our Babu: 1955 2000 Guineas Stakes winner
- Outstandingly: Won the inaugural Breeders' Cup Juvenile Fillies in 1984, and named American champion 2-year-old filly
- Outstrip: British horse that won the 2013 Breeders' Cup Juvenile Turf
- Overdose: Champion Hungarian sprinter and winner of 14 straight races.
- Owen Tudor: 1941 Epsom Derby winner
- Oxbow: 2013 Preakness Stakes winner

=== P ===
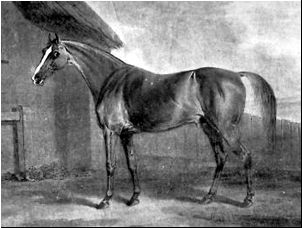
Potoooooooo

- Palace Malice: 2013 Belmont Stakes winner
- Palestine: 2000 Guineas Stakes, St James's Palace Stakes, and Sussex Stakes winner in 1950
- Pall Mall: Winner of the 2000 Guineas Stakes in 1958. Owned by Queen Elizabeth II
- Pan: 1808 Epsom Derby winner
- Panique: 1884 Belmont Stakes winner
- Panthalassa: First Japanese horse to win the Saudi Cup
- Papyrus: 1923 Epsom Derby winner
- Paradox: 1885 2000 Guineas Stakes and Grand Prix de Paris winner
- Paris: 1806 Epsom Derby winner
- Parth: Winner of the 1923 Prix de l'Arc de Triomphe
- Parthia: 1959 Epsom Derby and 1960 Jockey Club Cup winner
- Pasch: 1938 2000 Guineas Stakes and Eclipse Stakes winner
- Paseana: Argentinian horse that won 10 Grade-1 races between Argentina and the United States, including the 1992 Breeders' Cup Distaff
- Pass Catcher: 1971 Belmont Stakes winner
- Pasteurized: 1938 Belmont Stakes winner
- Pastille: 1822 2000 Guineas Stakes and Epsom Oaks winner
- Patron: 1894 Melbourne Cup winner
- Paul Jones: 1920 Kentucky Derby winner
- Paul Kauvar: 1897 Preakness Stakes winner
- Paulina: 1807 St Leger Stakes and 1809 Great Subscription Purse winner. Successful broodmare after racing.
- Pavot: 1945 Belmont Stakes winner, American champion 2-year-old colt in 1944
- Pay the Butler: American-bred horse, winner of the Japan Cup in 1988
- Pay Up: 1936 2000 Guineas Stakes winner
- Peace Chance: 1934 Belmont Stakes winner
- Pearl Diver: 1947 Epsom Derby winner
- Pebbles: British-bred horse that won the 1984 1000 Guineas Stakes and 1985 Eclipse Stakes, Champion Stakes, and Breeders' Cup Turf
- Peleid: 1973 St Leger Stakes winner
- Pennekamp: American-bred, French-trained horse that won the Prix de la Salamandre in 1994 and the 2000 Guineas Stakes in 1995
- Pensive: 1944 Kentucky Derby and Preakness Stakes winner
- Peregrine: 1881 2000 Guineas Stakes winner
- Perfect Shirl: 2011 Breeders' Cup Filly & Mare Turf winner
- Perfect Sting: 2000 Breeders' Cup Filly & Mare Turf winner
- Persimmon: Winner of the Epsom Derby and St Leger Stakes in 1896, and the Ascot Gold Cup in 1897
- Personal Ensign: 1988 Breeders' Cup Distaff winner, undefeated in 13 races
- Personality: 1970 Preakness Stakes winner and American Horse of the Year
- Peter Pan (Australia): winner of the Melbourne Cup in 1932 and 1934.
- Peter Pan (US): Winner of the Belmont Stakes in 1907, and had the Peter Pan Stakes named in his honor
- Petrarch: Winner of the 1876 2000 Guineas Stakes and St Leger Stakes, and the 1877 Ascot Gold Cup
- Petronel: 1880 2000 Guineas Stakes winner
- Petronius: 1808 St Leger Stakes winner
- Pewett: 1789 St Leger Stakes winner
- Phalanx: 1947 Belmont Stakes winner and American champion 3-year-old colt
- Phantom: 1811 Epsom Derby winner
- Phar Lap: Australia and New Zealand's most famed Thoroughbred racehorse; won 37 of his 51 career starts
- Phil Drake: 1955 Epsom Derby and Grand Prix de Paris winner
- Phone Chatter: 1993 Breeders' Cup Juvenile Fillies winner
- Phosphorus: 1837 Epsom Derby winner
- Pilgrimage: 1878 1000 Guineas Stakes and 2000 Guineas Stakes winner
- Pillory: 1922 Preakness Stakes and Belmont Stakes winner
- Pilsudski: Irish-bred horse that won Grade-I stakes in numerous countries, including the Grosser Preis von Baden and Breeders' Cup Turf in 1996, the Eclipse Stakes, Irish Champion Stakes, and Champion Stakes in 1997, and the Japan Cup in 1998
- Pindarrie: 1820 2000 Guineas Stakes winner
- Pine Bluff: 1992 Preakness Stakes winner
- Pink Star: 1907 Kentucky Derby winner
- Pinza: 1953 Epsom Derby and King George VI and Queen Elizabeth Stakes winner
- Pioneerof the Nile: Sire of American Triple Crown winner American Pharoah
- Pixie Knight: 2021 Sprinters Stakes winner
- Plaudit: 1898 Kentucky Derby winner
- Pleasant Colony: 1981 Kentucky Derby and Preakness Stakes winner
- Pleasant Stage: 1991 Breeders' Cup Juvenile Fillies winner
- Pleasant Tap: 1992 Jockey Club Gold Cup and Churchill Downs Handicap winner, and American champion older male horse for 1992. A successful sire after retiring
- Pleasantly Perfect: 2003 Breeders' Cup Classic winner
- Plenipotentiary: 1834 Epsom Derby and St James's Palace Stakes winner
- Pocahontas: Major broodmare, considered one of the most influential breeding thoroughbreds of all time, male or female
- Poetic Flare: Winner of the 2000 Guineas Stakes and St James's Palace Stakes in 2021
- Point Given: 2001 Preakness Stakes and Belmont Stakes winner, American Horse of the Year
- Polemarch: 1921 St Leger Stakes winner. Successful breeding stallion in Argentina after racing
- Polynesian: 1945 Preakness Stakes winner, sire of Native Dancer
- Pommern: Winner of the English wartime Triple Crown in 1915
- Ponder: 1949 Kentucky Derby winner
- Pont l'Eveque: British horse that won the Epsom Derby in 1940
- Pop Rock: 2006 & 2007 Meguro Kinen winner, runner-up in several Japanese and Australian grade I races.
- Popcorn Deelites: The main horse who played Seabiscuit in the Oscar Nominated film Seabiscuit
- Pope: 1809 Epsom Derby winner
- Potager: 2022 Ōsaka Hai winner
- Potoooooooo: 18th-century thoroughbred racehorse who won over 30 races and defeated some of the greatest racehorses of the time.
- Pounced: 2009 Breeders' Cup Juvenile Turf winner
- Pour Moi: Irish-bred French-trained horse that won the Epsom Derby win 2011
- Prairie Bayou: 1993 Preakness Stakes winner
- Precisionist: 1985 Breeders' Cup Sprint winner, U.S. champion sprint horse
- Premonition: 1953 St Leger Stakes winner
- Pretender: Winner of the 2000 Guineas Stakes and Epsom Derby in 1869
- Pretty Polly Irish Thoroughbred racehorse who won 15 consecutive races, fifth filly to win the British Fillies Triple Crown, record 24: 22–2–0
- Priam (Indonesia): 1974 Indonesia Derby winner
- Priam (UK): 1830 Epsom Derby winner
- Prince Leopold: 1816 Epsom Derby winner
- Prince Palatine: Won the 1911 St Leger Stakes, 1912 Eclipse Stakes. 1912 & 1913 Ascot Gold Cup, and 1913 Coronation Cup.
- Prince Rose: British-bred Belgian-trained racehorse, regarded as best horse in Belgian horse racing history
- Princely Gift: British sprinter, later had some success as a sire
- Princequillo: Irish-born horse who became a leading sire in North America
- Princess Gavi: Indonesian racehorse who won the Pertiwi Cup in 2025 (a 3-year-old mare only racing series)
- Princess Rooney: First winner of the Breeders' Cup Distaff, American champion older-mare in 1984
- Privy Councillor: 1962 2000 Guineas Stakes winner
- Prized: 1989 Breeders' Cup Turf winner
- Proud Clarion: 1967 Kentucky Derby winner
- Proud Truth: 1985 Florida Derby and Breeders' Cup Classic winner
- Provoke: 1965 St Leger Stakes winner
- Psidium: 1961 Epsom Derby winner
- Pyrrhus The First: 1846 Epsom Derby winner and notable sire

=== Q ===
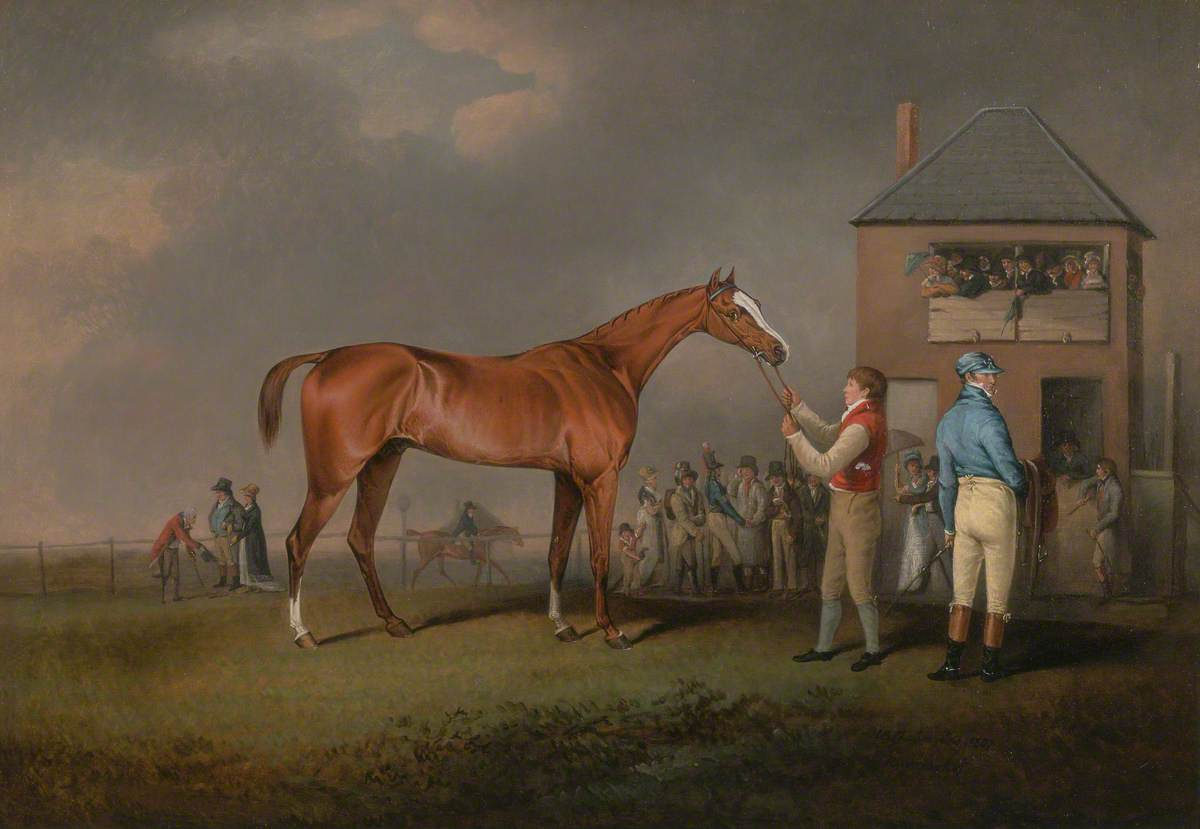
Quiz

- Qemah: Irish-bred French-trained horse that won the Coronation Stakes and Prix Rothschild in 2016
- Quadrangle: 1964 Belmont Stakes winner
- Quality Road: 2009 Florida Derby and 2010 Metropolitan Handicap winner. Also a successful sire
- Queen of Trumps: 1835 Epsom Oaks and St Leger Stakes winner
- Queensway: Won the Canadian Triple Crown
- Quest for Fame: 1990 Epsom Derby winner
- Questionnaire: Won the Brooklyn Stakes, the Empire City Handicap, and the Metropolitan Handicap in 1931
- Quevega: Only horse in the history to win at six consecutive Cheltenham Festivals
- Quiet American: Significant sire that produced multiple grade-1 winners
- Quill: American champion two-year-old filly, later a successful broodmare
- Quiz: 1801 St Leger Stakes winner

=== R ===
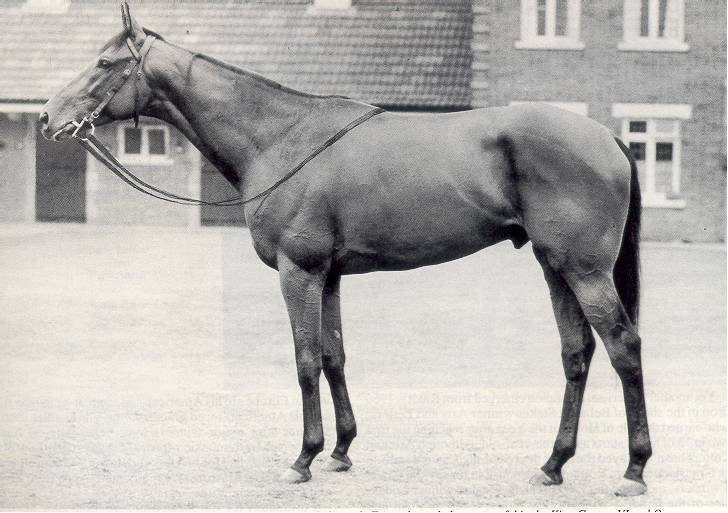
Ribot

- Rachel Alexandra: Filly and winner of the 2009 Preakness Stakes
- Rags to Riches: 2007 Belmont Stakes winner and American champion 3-year-old filly
- Rakwool: Australian bay gelding, won the 1931 Grand National Steeplechase
- Rapid Dash: 2024 Indonesia Derby Winner
- Ratu Mayangkara: 1997 Indonesia Derby Winner, one of the Undefeated Racehorses, with 100% win rate.
- Raven's Pass: 2008 Queen Elizabeth II Stakes winner, first English-trained horse to win Breeders' Cup Classic (2008)
- Rayon d'Or: French horse that won the 1879 Champion Stakes, Sussex Stakes, St James's Palace Stakes, St Leger Stakes, and 1880 Prix du Cadran. Later a leading sire in North America.
- Real Quiet: Winner of the 1998 Kentucky Derby and Preakness Stakes; lost the third leg of the U.S. Triple Crown, the Belmont Stakes, by a margin of four inches
- Rebel's Romance: Irish-bred British-trained horse that won multiple Group 1/Grade 1 events, including the Grosser Preis von Berlin (2022, 2025), the Preis von Europa (2022, 2024), and the Breeders' Cup Turf (2022, 2024)
- Red Bullet: 2000 Preakness Stakes winner
- Red Desire: Winner of the 2009 Shūka Shō, well known for her two second-place finishes in Grade 1 races to 2010 Japanese Horse of the Year Buena Vista
- Red Rocks: Irish-bred British-trained horse that won the Breeders' Cup Turf in 2006
- Red Rum: Only horse in the history of the Aintree Grand National to win the race three times (placed second on two other occasions)
- Reference Point: 1987 Epsom Derby and St Leger Stakes winner
- Refund: 1888 Preakness Stakes winner
- Refuse To Bend: 2003 2000 Guineas Stakes, Queen Anne Stakes, and Eclipse Stakes winner
- Regaleira: Japanese racehorse who won the 2023 Hopeful Stakes, 2024 Arima Kinen, and 2025 Queen Elizabeth II Cup
- Regret: First filly to win the Kentucky Derby (1915)
- Reigh Count: 1928 Kentucky Derby and 1929 Coronation Cup winner. 1928 American Horse of the Year
- Rejected: Santa Anita Handicap winner
- Relko: French horse that won the Poule d'Essai des Poulains and Epsom Derby in 1964, and the Grand Prix de Saint-Cloud and Coronation Cup in 1964
- Remembrancer: 1803 St Leger Stakes and 1804 Great Subscription Purse. A successful broodmare sire after racing.
- Renegade: 2026 Arkansas Derby winner
- Resistencia: 2019 Hanshin Juvenile Fillies winner and Japanese best two-year-old filly
- Reveller: 1818 St Leger Stakes and 1819, 1820, and 1821 Great Subscription Purse winner
- Rhadamanthus: 1790 Epsom Derby winner
- Rhein Kraft: Japanese racehorse who won the 2005 Oka Sho and NHK Mile Cup, unexpectedly died of acute heart failure during training in August 2006
- Rhine Maiden: 1915 Preakness Stakes winner
- Rhythm: 1989 Breeders' Cup Juvenile winner
- Ribero: 1968 Irish Derby and St Leger Stakes winner
- Ribocco: 1967 Irish Derby and St Leger Stakes winner
- Ribot: Thoroughbred undefeated in sixteen races
- Rice Shower: Winner of the 1992 Kikka Sho and two-time Tennō Shō winner; euthanized after breaking his leg during the 1995 Takarazuka Kinen
- Rich Strike: 2022 Kentucky Derby winner
- Riddlesworth: 1831 2000 Guineas Stakes winner
- Ridge Wood: 1949 St Leger Stakes winner
- Ridgewood Pearl: Irish filly that won the Irish 1,000 Guineas, Coronation Stakes, Prix du Moulin de Longchamp, and Breeders' Cup Mile in 1995. European Horse of the Year in 1995
- Right Tack: 1969 2000 Guineas Stakes, Irish 2,000 Guineas, and St James's Palace Stakes winner
- Riley: 1890 Kentucky Derby winner
- Risen Star: 1988 Preakness Stakes and Belmont Stakes winner and champion American 3-year-old. Has Risen Star Stakes named after him
- Riva Ridge: 1972 Kentucky Derby and Belmont Stakes winner, listed as #57 on Top 100 American racehorses of the 20th Century
- Riverman: American-bred French-trained horse, winner of the Poule d'Essai des Poulains and the Prix d'Ispahan. Later became a leading sire in France.
- Robert the Devil: 1880 Grand Prix de Paris, St Leger Stakes, Coronation Cup, and 1981 Ascot Gold Cup winner, regarded as one of the greatest racehorses of the 19th century.
- Roberto: 1972 Epsom Derby winner and sire of Brian's Time and Dynaformer
- Rock of Gibraltar: Irish horse that won seven consecutive Group 1 races, including the 2000 Guineas Stakes and Irish 2,000 Guineas in 2002. Cartier Horse of the Year in 2002
- Rock Sand: English Triple Crown winner (1903); sire of the dam of Man o' War
- Rockavon: 1961 2000 Guineas Stakes winner
- Rockingham: 1833 St Leger Stakes and 1835 Goodwood Cup winner
- Rodosto: Winner of the 2000 Guineas Stakes and Poule d'Essai des Poulains in 1933, and the Prix d'Ispahan in 1934
- Rodrigo de Triano: American-bred British-trained horse that won the 2000 Guineas Stakes, Irish 2,000 Guineas, International Stakes, and Champion Stakes in 1992. Cartier Champion Three-year-old Colt for 1992
- Roland Gardens: 1978 2000 Guineas Stakes winner
- Rombauer: 2021 Preakness Stakes winner
- Romantic Warrior: Winner of multiple Grade I races in Hong Kong, Australia, and Japan
- Roses In May: Winner of the Whitney Handicap in 2004 and Dubai World Cup in 2005
- Round Pond: 2006 Breeders' Cup Distaff winner
- Round Table: Sire of stakes winners; born in the same barn the same night as Bold Ruler, in 1954
- Rowton: 1829 St Leger Stakes and 1831 Great Subscription Purse winner
- Roy H: Two-time Breeders' Cup Sprint winner, American champion sprint horse in 2017 & 2018
- Roy Olcott: Harness racehorse
- Royal Academy: Breeders' Cup Mile winner in 1990
- Royal Delta: Winner of the Breeders' Cup Ladies' Classic in 2011 and 2012. American champion 3-year-old filly in 2011, and champion older mare in 2012 and 2013
- Royal Heroine: Irish horse that won the Child Stakes and Prix de l'Opéra in 1983 and the inaugural Breeders' Cup Mile in 1984
- Royal Lancer: 1922 St Leger Stakes and Irish St. Leger winner
- Royal Orbit: 1959 Preakness Stakes winner
- Royal Palace: Winner of the 2000 Guineas Stakes and Epsom Derby in 1967
- Royal Tourist: 1908 Preakness Stakes winner
- Ruffian: Two time winner of the Eclipse Award who won ten consecutive races and was euthanized after breaking her leg in a race at Belmont Park
- Rule of Law: 2004 St Leger Stakes winner. Top rated stayer for 2004
- Ruler: 1780 St Leger Stakes winner
- Ruler of the World: 2013 Epsom Derby winner
- Ruler on Ice: 2011 Belmont Stakes winner
- Runhappy: 2015 Breeders' Cup Sprint and Malibu Stakes winner, American champion sprint horse
- Ruthless: First ever winner of the Belmont Stakes, and the first of only three fillies ever to win the Belmont Stakes

=== S ===
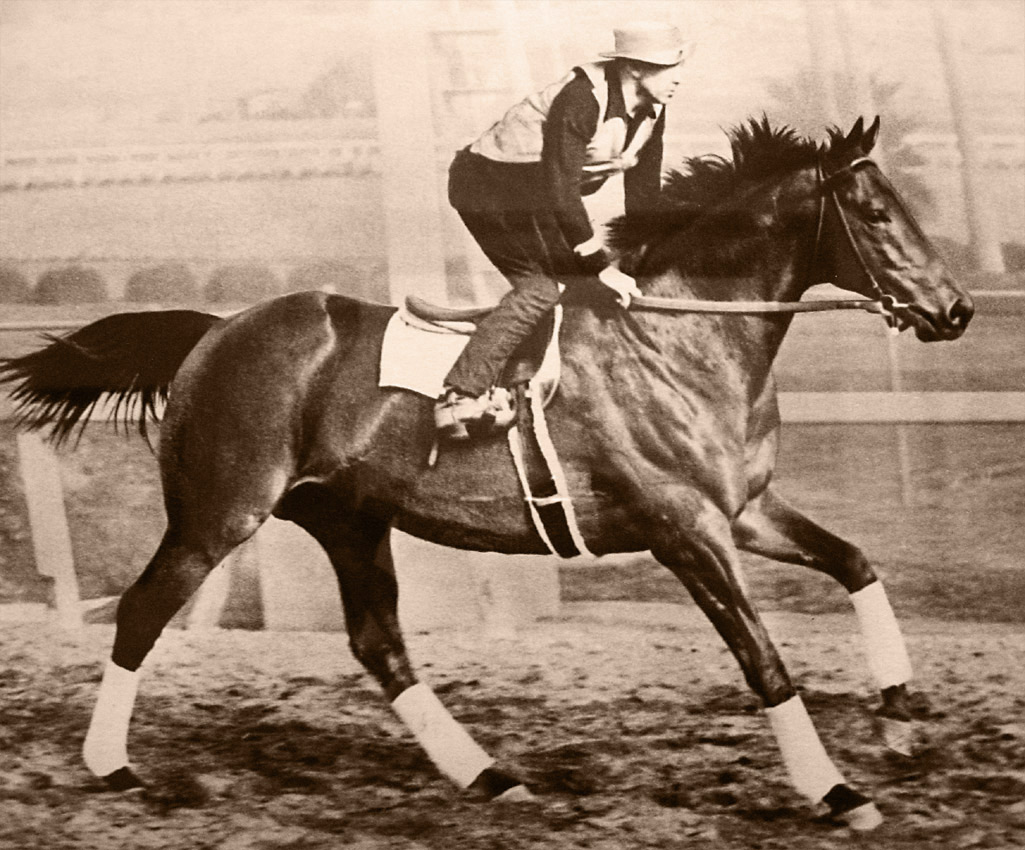
Seabiscuit

- Sacahuista: 1987 Breeders' Cup Distaff winner and American champion 3-year-old filly
- Sadler's Wells: One of Europe's most successful sires of the late 20th century
- Safely Kept, 1990 Breeders' Cup Sprint winner, American champion sprint horse
- Sailor: 1820 Epsom Derby winner
- Sainfoin: 1890 Epsom Derby winner, namesake for the HMS Sainfoin
- Saint Liam: 2005 Breeders' Cup Classic winner and American Horse of the Year
- Saint Lite: The first horse to win the Japanese Triple Crown (1941)
- Sakura Bakushin O: Winner of 1993 and 1994 Sprinters Stakes
- Sakura Chiyono O: Winner of the 1988 Tokyo Yūshun
- Sakura Laurel: 1996 Japanese Horse of the Year, winner of the Tenno Sho (spring) and Arima Kinen
- Sakura Star O: 1987 Satsuki Shō and Kikuka-shō winner. Japanese Horse of the Year for 1987.
- Salmon-Trout: 1924 St Leger Stakes winner
- Saltram: 1783 Epsom Derby winner
- Sam: 1818 Epsom Derby winner
- Sancho: 1804 St Leger Stakes winner
- Sandman: 2025 Arkansas Derby winner, named after Metallica song "Enter Sandman"
- Sandwich: 1931 St Leger Stakes winner
- Sansovino: 1924 Epsom Derby and Prince of Wales's Stakes winner
- Santa Claus: Winner of the Irish 2,000 Guineas, the Irish Derby, and the Epsom Derby in 1964
- Sarava: 2002 Belmont Stakes winner
- Sardanapale: Regarded as one of the best French-trained racehorses in history
- Sari Pohaci: 1987 Indonesia Derby Winner
- Satono Crown: Winner of the 2016 Hong Kong Vase and 2017 Takarazuka Kinen, sired Tastiera
- Satono Diamond: Winner of the 2016 Kikka Sho and Arima Kinen
- Satono Reve: 2025 & 2026 Takamatsunomiya Kinen winner
- Saunterer: 1881 Preakness Stakes and Belmont Stakes winner
- Saxon: British-bred American-trained horse that won the 1874 Belmont Stakes
- Saxon Warrior: 2018 2000 Guineas Stakes winner
- Sayajirao: 1947 St Leger Stakes winner
- Sayyedati: Winner of the 1000 Guineas Stakes and Prix Jacques Le Marois in 1993, and the Sussex Stakes in 1995
- Scandinavia: 2025 St Leger Stakes and 2026 Ascot Gold Cup winner
- Scat Daddy: 2006 Champagne Stakes and 2007 Florida Derby winner, a successful sire after injury ended his racing career early
- Sceptre: Only horse to win four British classic races (2000 Guineas Stakes, 1000 Guineas Stakes, Epsom Oaks, and St Leger Stakes, all in 1902)
- Schnell Meister: German-Bred Japanese-trained horse that won the 2021 NHK Mile Cup
- Scorpion: 2005 Grand Prix de Paris and St Leger Stakes winner
- Scot Free: 1884 2000 Guineas Stakes winner
- Scottish Chieftain: 1897 Belmont Stakes winner
- Scottish Union: 1938 St James's Palace Stakes and St Leger Stakes winner
- Scratch: Winner of the 1950 Prix du Jockey Club and St Leger Stakes, and the 1951 Prix Jean Prat
- Screen Hero: Winner of the 2008 Japan Cup, sire of Maurice
- Sea Bird: Winner of the Prix de l'Arc de Triomphe and the Epsom Derby in 1965. Second highest Timeform rated horse (rated 145)
- Sea Hero: 1993 Kentucky Derby and Travers Stakes winner
- Sea The Moon: 2014 Deutsches Derby winner
- Sea The Stars: First horse ever to win the 2,000 Guineas, Epsom Derby, and Arc de Triomphe in the same year (2009)
- Seabiscuit: Beat War Admiral in a nationally broadcast 1938 match race; like Phar Lap, raced during the Depression
- Seabreeze: 1888 Epsom Oaks, Coronation Stakes, Lancashire Plate, and St Leger Stakes winner
- Sealy Hill: First horse to win the Canadian Triple Tiara (2007)
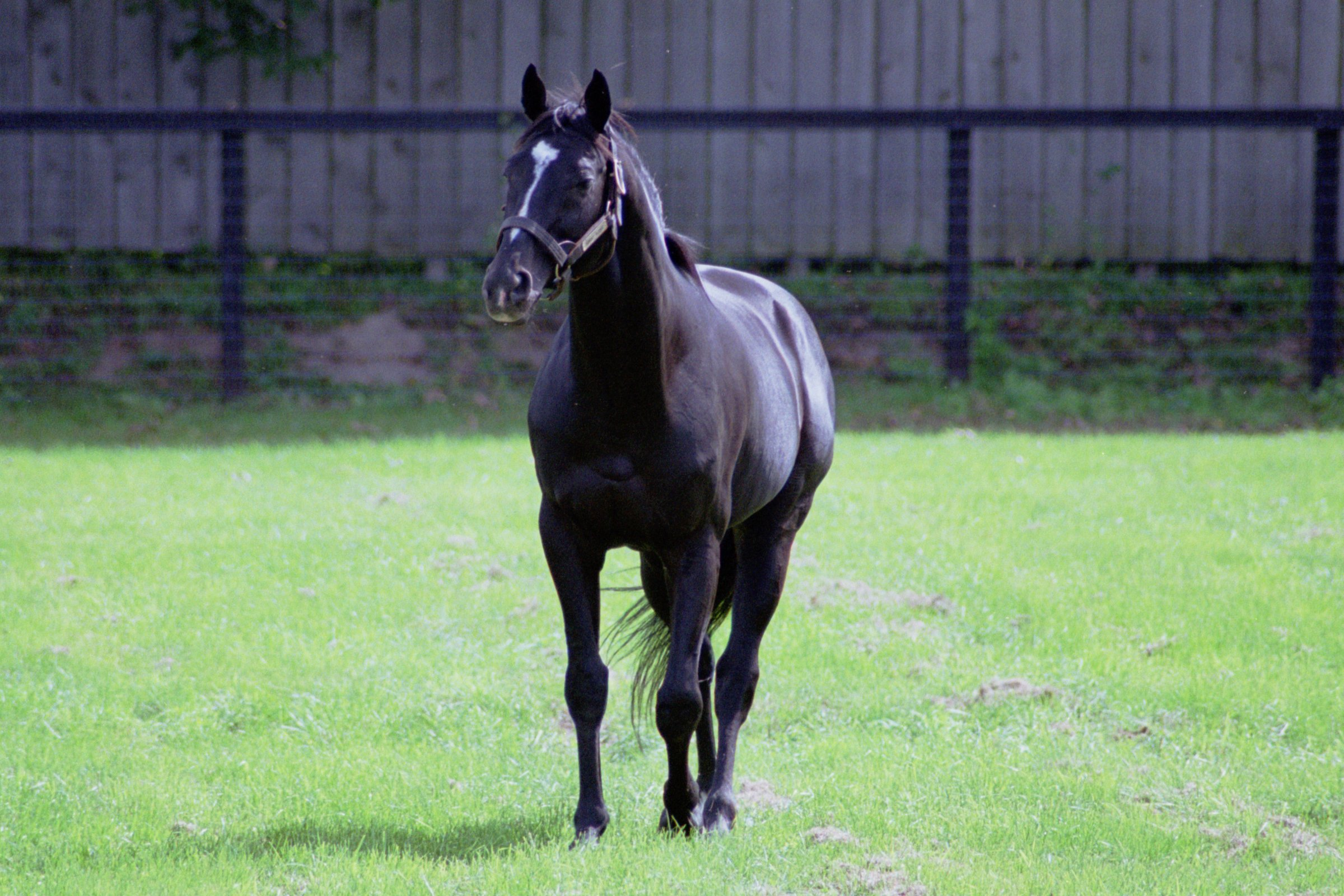
- Sunday Silence
  Seattle Slew: U.S. Triple Crown winner (1977)
- Seattle Smooth: Grade 1 Ogden Phipps Handicap winner (2009)
- Secret Circle: 2011 Breeders' Cup Juvenile Sprint, 2013 Breeders' Cup Sprint and 2015 Dubai Golden Shaheen winner
- Secretariat: U.S. Triple Crown winner (1973); one of the most famous horses in Thoroughbred racing, influential sire
- Secreto: 1984 Epsom Derby winner
- Seeking the Pearl: American-bred Japanese-trained horse that won the NHK Mile Cup in 1997 and the Prix Maurice de Gheest in 1998
- Sefton: 1878 Epsom Derby winner
- Seiun Sky: 1998 Japanese Double Crown winner, taking the Satsuki Shō and Kikuka-shō
- Seize the Grey: 2024 Preakness Stakes winner
- Serjeant: 1784 Epsom Derby and 1786 1200 Guineas Stakes winner
- Serpentine: 2020 Epsom Derby winner
- Shaamit: 1996 Epsom Derby winner
- Shackleford: 2011 Preakness Stakes winner
- Shadeed: 1985 2000 Guineas Stakes and Queen Elizabeth II Stakes winner
- Shahrastani: 1986 Epsom Derby and Irish Derby winner
- Shahryar: Winner of the 2021 Tokyo Yūshun and 2022 Dubai Sheema Classic
- Sham: The main competitor to Secretariat during the 1973 racing season
- Shanghai Bobby: 2012 Breeders' Cup Juvenile winner
- Shantou: 1996 St Leger Stakes winner
- She Be Wild: 2009 Breeders' Cup Juvenile Fillies winner
- Sheikh Albadou, British horse, winner of the 1991 Breeders' Cup Sprint
- Shenanigans: Leading broodmare, dam of Ruffian
- Shergar: Winner of the 1981 Epsom Derby by a record 10 lengths, the longest winning margin in a race run annually since 1781; kidnapped by the IRA in 1983, and was held for ransom, but the owner syndicate refused to pay, fearing that valuable horses would become targets; the stallion was never found
- Sherluck: 1961 Belmont Stakes winner
- Shinko Lovely: Irish-bred Japanese-trained horse that won the 1993 Mile Championship
- Shinzan: Japanese Triple Crown winner of 1964.
- Shirley: 1876 Preakness Stakes winner
- Shirley Heights: 1978 Epsom Derby and Irish Derby winner
- Shirocco: German-bred horse that won the Deutsches Derby in 2004 and Breeders' Cup Turf in 2005. German Horse of the Year in 2005
- Shotover: 1882 2000 Guineas Stakes and Epsom Derby winner. First filly to win the first two legs of the English triple crown
- Shut Out: 1942 Kentucky Derby and Belmont Stakes winner
- Sierra Leone: 2024 Breeders' Cup Classic winner
- Signorinetta: 1908 Epsom Derby and Epsom Oaks winner
- Silence Suzuka: Winner of the 1998 Takarazuka Kinen, known for an unusually aggressive front-running style, whose legs broke in the Tenno Sho that same year, leading to his untimely euthanization.
- Silic: French horse that won the Breeders' Cup Mile in 1999
- Silky Sullivan: An American racehorse best known for his come-from-behind racing style.
- Silver Charm: winner of the 1997 Kentucky Derby and Preakness Stakes, and of the 1998 Dubai World Cup
- Silver Patriarch: 1997 St Leger Stakes and Coronation Cup winner.
- Silver Train: 2005 Breeders' Cup Sprint winner
- Silverbulletday: 1998 Breeders' Cup Juvenile Fillies winner. Also won the 1999 Kentucky Oaks, Black-Eyed Susan Stakes, and Alabama Stakes
- Silvio: 1877 Epsom Derby and St. Leger Stakes winner
- Simple Verse: 2015 St Leger Stakes winner. Cartier Champion Stayer for 2015
- Singapore: 1930 St Leger Stakes winner
- Sinndar: Winner of the 2000 Epsom Derby, Irish Derby and Prix de l'Arc de Triomphe
- Sir Barton: First winner of the American Triple Crown (1919), #49 on list of Top 100 American racehorses of the 20th Century
- Sir Bevys: 1879 Epsom Derby winner
- Sir Dixon: 1888 Belmont Stakes winner
- Sir Gallahad: French racehorse who became a leading sire in North America during the 1920s and 1930s
- Sir Gaylord: Successful 2-year-old in 1961, became a successful sire after injury ended his racing
- Sir Harry (Canada): Winner of the 1927 Coffroth Handicap
- Sir Harry (UK): 1798 Epsom Derby winner
- Sir Hugo: 1892 Epsom Derby winner
- Sir Huon: 1906 Kentucky Derby and Latonia Derby winner
- Sir Ivor: American-bred Irish-trained horse that won the 2000 Guineas Stakes, Epsom Derby, Champion Stakes, and Washington D.C. International in 1968
- Sir John: 1890 Travers Stakes winner
- Sir Percy: 2006 Epsom Derby winner
- Sir Peter Teazle: 1787 Epsom Derby winner
- Sir Tatton Sykes: 1846 2000 Guineas Stakes and St. Leger Stakes winner
- Sir Thomas: 1788 Epsom Derby winner
- Sir Visto: 1895 Epsom Derby and St. Leger Stakes winner
- Sir Winston: Winner of 2019 Belmont Stakes
- Sirius Symboli: Winner of the 1985 Tokyo Yūshun and one of few Japanese horses at the time chosen to compete in Europe
- Sistercharlie: Irish horse that won the 2018 Breeders' Cup Filly & Mare Turf and was named American champion female turf horse
- Six Perfections: French-bred horse that won the 2003 Breeders' Cup Mile. European champion 2-year-old filly in 2002
- Sixties Icon: 2006 St Leger Stakes winner
- Skewball: Immortalized in 18th century poetry as a sku-ball winning against a Thoroughbred
- Skip Away: 10-time Grade 1 stakes winner, including 1997 Breeders' Cup Classic. 1998 American Horse of the Year
- Skyscraper: 1789 Epsom Derby winner
- Skywalker: 1986 Breeders' Cup Classic winner
- Slieve Gallion: 1907 2000 Guineas Stakes and St James's Palace Stakes winner
- Slip Anchor: 1985 Epsom Derby winner
- Sly Fox: 1898 Preakness Stakes winner
- Smart Falcon: Japanese racehorse known as the "Runner of the Dirt", two-time winner of the Tokyo Daishoten and JBC Classic, with a total of six grade 1 victories and 19 graded flat race wins
- Smart Strike: Canadian horse, leading sire in North America
- Smarten: Multiple-graded stakes winner, later sire of major broodmare Classy 'n Smart
- Smarty Jones: First unbeaten Kentucky Derby winner since Seattle Slew in 1977
- Smile: 1986 Breeders' Cup Sprint winner, American champion sprint horse
- Smolensko: 1813 2000 Guineas Stakes and Epsom Derby winner
- Snow Chief: 1986 Preakness Stakes winner, 3-time California Horse of the Year and 1986 American champion 3-year-old
- Snow Knight: 1974 Epsom Derby and 1975 Canadian International Stakes winner
- Snurge: 1990 St Leger Stakes and 1992 Canadian International Stakes winner
- So Happy: 2026 Santa Anita Derby winner.
- Soaring Softly: First winner of the Breeders' Cup Filly & Mare Turf in 1999
- Sodashi: First white horse to win a Grade 1 race (Hanshin Juvenile Fillies), and also went on to win 2 other Grade 1 races in her race career
- Sodium: 1966 Irish Derby and St Leger Stakes winner
- Somethingroyal: Successful broodmare, best known as the dam of Sir Gaylord and Secretariat
- Son of Love: 1979 St Leger Stakes winner
- Song of Wind: 2006 Kikuka-shō winner
- Songbird: 2015 Breeders' Cup Juvenile Fillies and 2016 Coaching Club American Oaks and Alabama Stakes winner. American champion two-year-old and three-year-old filly
- Soothsayer: 1811 St Leger Stakes winner. Later a leading sire in Britain and Ireland
- Southern Halo: American horse that won Swaps Stakes and Super Derby winner, later became a leading sire in Argentina and one of the most successful sires in South American horse racing
- Sovereignty: 2025 Kentucky Derby and Belmont Stakes winner
- Space Blues: Irish horse that won the Prix Maurice de Gheest in 2020 and Prix de la Forêt & Breeders' Cup Mile in 2021
- Spain: 2000 Breeders' Cup Distaff winner
- Spaniel: 1831 Epsom Derby winner
- Spearmint: 1906 Epsom Derby and Grand Prix de Paris winner
- Special Week: 1998 Tokyo Yūshun winner, as well as the Japan Cup and both Tennō Shōs, sire of Buena Vista
- Spectacular Bid: Hall of Fame champion who went undefeated as a four-year-old, and won 26 of 30 career starts
- Speightstown: 2004 Breeders' Cup Sprint winner and American champion sprint horse. Later a significant sire
- Spend a Buck: 1985 Kentucky Derby winner and American Horse of the Year
- Spendthrift: 1879 Belmont Stakes winner, later became a major sire producing numerous champion horses. Later became the namesake of the famed Spendthrift Farm
- Spinning World: American-bred French-trained horse that won the Irish 2,000 Guineas in 1996, the Prix Jacques Le Marois in 1996 & 1997, the Prix du Moulin de Longchamp in 1997, and the Breeders' Cup Mile in 1997
- Spion Kop: 1920 Epsom Derby winner
- Spokane: 1889 Kentucky Derby winner
- Spread Eagle: 1795 Epsom Derby winner
- Springbok: 1873 Belmont Stakes winner, American champion older male horse in 1874 and 1875
- Squirtle Squirt: 2001 Breeders' Cup Sprint winner, American champion sprint horse
- St. Amant: 1903 2000 Guineas Stakes and Epsom Derby winner
- St. Blaise: 1883 Epsom Derby winner
- St. Frusquin: 1896 2000 Guineas Stakes and Eclipse Stakes winner
- St. Gatien: Tied for first in a dead heat in the 1884 Epsom Derby. Also won the Ascot Gold Cup in 1885
- St. Giles: 1832 Epsom Derby winner
- St Louis: 1922 2000 Guineas Stakes winner
- St Nicholas Abbey: Irish horse that won the Coronation Cup three times in a row (2011–13). Also won the Breeders' Cup Turf in 2011
- St. Paddy: Epsom Derby and St Leger Stakes winner in 1960
- St Patrick: 1820 St Leger Stakes winner
- St. Simon: Undefeated British racehorse and successful sire
- Stage Door Johnny: 1968 Belmont Stakes winner and American champion 3-year-old-colt
- Star Appeal: Irish-bred German-trained horse, first German-trained horse to win the Prix de l'Arc de Triomphe
- Star Guitar: Four-times winner of Louisiana-bred Horse of the Year, considered one of the most significant Louisiana-bred horses of all time
- Stardom Bound: 2008 Breeders' Cup Juvenile Fillies winner
- Starine: French horse that won the Matriarch Stakes and the Breeders' Cup Filly & Mare Turf
- Staveley: 1805 St Leger Stakes
- Stay Gold: Dubbed "the Silver Collector" during his racing career before winning the 2001 Dubai Sheema Classic and Hong Kong Vase shortly before his retirement; went on to sire Orfevre, Gold Ship, Dream Journey, Nakayama Festa, Fenomeno, Win Bright, Indy Champ, and Oju Chosan
- Steel Dust: 19th-century quarter-mile racing horse.
- Steinlen: British-bred horse that won the Breeders' Cup Mile in 1989, and was American champion male turf horse
- Stellar Wind: Stellar Wind is an American Thoroughbred racehorse, known for her Eclipse Award winning three-year-old season, and later for her rivalry with the champion mare Beholder.
- Stephanie's Kitten: Winner of the Breeders' Cup Juvenile Fillies Turf in 2011 and the Breeders' Cup Filly & Mare Turf in 2012
- Stevie Wonderboy: 2005 Breeders' Cup Juvenile winner
- Still in Love: 2003 Japanese Fillies' Triple Crown winner
- Stockwell: 1852 2000 Guineas Stakes and St. Leger Stakes winner; 7 times leading sire in Britain and Ireland, and another 4 times 2nd-leading sire
- Stone Street: 1908 Kentucky Derby winner, holds record for slowest winning time for the Kentucky Derby
- Stopchargingmaria: 2015 Breeders' Cup Distaff winner
- Storm Cat: One of the most successful U.S. sires of the late 20th century
- Storm Flag Flying: 2002 Breeders' Cup Juvenile Fillies winner
- Storm Song: 1996 Breeders' Cup Juvenile Fillies winner
- Storm the Court: 2019 Breeders' Cup Juvenile winner
- Stormy Liberal: Winner of the Breeders' Cup Turf Sprint in 2017 and 2018
- Straight Deal: 1943 Epsom Derby winner
- Street Sense: 2006 Breeders' Cup Juvenile and 2007 Kentucky Derby winner
- Strike the Gold: 1991 Kentucky Derby winner
- Success Express: 1987 Breeders' Cup Juvenile winner
- Summer Bird: 2009 Belmont Stakes winner and American champion 3-year-old male
- Summer Squall: 1990 Preakness Stakes winner
- Summing: 1981 Belmont Stakes winner
- Sun Castle: 1941 St Leger Stakes winner
- Sun Chariot: 1942 1000 Guineas Stakes, Epsom Oaks, and St Leger Stakes winner - English filly's triple crown winner.
- Sun Goddess: 2026 Breeders' Cup Juvenile Fillies Turf winner
- Sunday Silence: 1989 Kentucky Derby and Preakness Stakes winner; champion sire in Japan
- Sunline: First Southern Hemisphere horse to top $10million in stakes earnings; three-time Australian (2000–2002); four-time New Zealand Horse of the Year (1999–2002); 13-time Group 1 winner
- Sunny's Halo: 1983 Kentucky Derby winner
- Sunstar: 2000 Guineas Stakes and Epsom Derby winner in 1911
- Super Creek: Japanese racehorse known for winning the 1988 Kikuka-shō and the 1989 Autumn and 1990 Spring Tenno Sho
- Super Saver: 2010 Kentucky Derby winner
- Surefoot: 1890 2000 Guineas Stakes and 1891 Eclipse Stakes winner
- Surplice: 1848 Epsom Derby and St Leger Stakes winner
- Survivor: First winner of the Preakness Stakes in 1873
- Swale: 1984 Kentucky Derby and Belmont Stakes winner, died eight days after the Belmont win
- Swaps: 1955 Kentucky Derby winner, 1956 American Horse of the Year, #20 on list of Top 100 American racehorses of the 20th Century
- Sweep: 1910 Belmont Stakes winner
- Sweep Tosho: Winner of the 2004 Shūka Shō, 2005 Takarazuka Kinen, and 2005 Queen Elizabeth II Cup
- Sweeper: French-bred British-trained racehorse that won the 1912 2000 Guineas Stakes
- Sweet Catomine: 2004 Breeders' Cup Juvenile Fillies winner
- Swiss Skydiver: 2020 Preakness Stakes winner
- Swynford: 1910 St Leger Stakes and 1911 Eclipse Stakes winner. Later both a leading sire and leading broodmare sire in Britain and Ireland.
- Symboli Kris S: Two time winner of the Arima Kinen, later sire of Epiphaneia
- Symboli Rudolf: Winner of the 1984 Japanese Triple Crown, and the first horse to win the Triple Crown undefeated, as well as the first horse in Japan to win 7 grade 1 victories, a record held for 35 years until surpassed by Almond Eye, sire of Tokai Teio
- Symmetry: 1798 St Leger Stakes winner

=== T ===
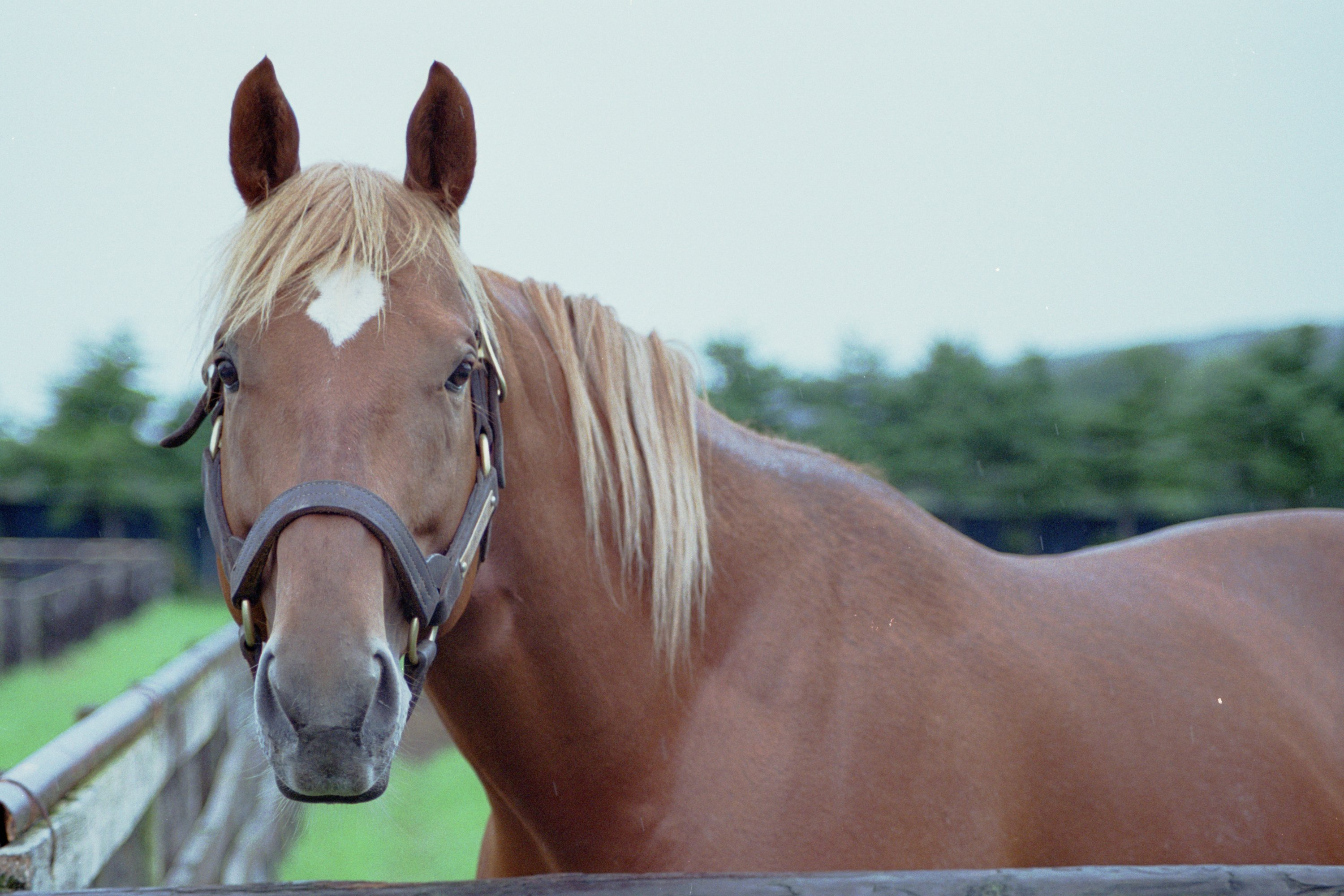
Taiki Shuttle

- T. M. Opera O: Became the Japanese Horse of the Year for the 2000 season after he went undefeated in all 8 races that he participated in, becoming the highest earning racehorse at the time in the process.
- T O Elvis: 2026 Churchill Downs Stakes and Breeders' Cup Sprint winner
- Ta Wee: Two-time American Champion Sprint Horse, and won her second Fall Highweight Handicap, at 10 stone (140 pounds) and her second Interborough Handicap, at 10 stone 2 pounds (142 pounds)
- Tabasco Cat: 1994 Preakness Stakes and Belmont Stakes winner
- Taboun: 1959 2000 Guineas Stakes winner
- Tagalie: 1912 1000 Guineas Stakes and Epsom Derby winner
- Taiki Shuttle: JRA Hall of Fame inductee, two-time Yasuda Kinen winner and the first Japanese-trained horse to win the Prix Jacques Le Marois.
- Take Charge Brandi: 2014 Breeders' Cup Juvenile Fillies and Starlet Stakes winner
- Talismanic: British-bred French-trained horse that won the 2017 Breeders' Cup Turf
- Talma: 1951 St Leger Stakes winner
- Tamamo Cross: First horse to win both the Spring and Autumn Tennō Shō in the same year (1988)
- Tamarkuz: 2016 Breeders' Cup Dirt Mile winner
- Tanino Gimlet: 2002 winner of the Japanese Derby; sire of Vodka
- Tank's Prospect: 1985 Preakness Stakes winner
- Tanya: Second filly ever to win the Belmont Stakes
- Tap Dance City: Winner of the 2003 Japan Cup and 2004 Takarazuka Kinen
- Tap On Wood: 1979 2000 Guineas Stakes winner
- Tapit: Three time Leading sire in North America
- Tapit Trice: 2023 Blue Grass Stakes winner
- Tapizar: 2012 Breeders' Cup Dirt Mile winner
- Tapwrit: Won the 2017 Belmont Stakes, and set a new stakes record for the Tampa Bay Derby
- Tarnawa: Irish-bred horse that won the 2020 Prix de l'Opéra, Prix Vermeille, and Breeders' Cup Turf
- Tarrare: 1826 St Leger Stakes winner
- Tartar: 1792 St Leger Stakes winner
- Tasso: 1985 Breeders' Cup Juvenile winner and U.S. champion two-year-old
- Tastiera: Japanese racehorse and winner of the Tōkyō Yūshun and the Hong Kong-based Queen Elizabeth II Cup
- Tecumseh: 1885 Preakness Stakes winner
- Ted Noffey: 2025 Breeders' Cup Juvenile winner
- Teddington: 1851 Epsom Derby and 1853 Emperor of Russia's Plate winner
- Teddy: French horse known as an influential sire
- Teenoso: 1983 Epsom Derby, 1984 Grand Prix de Saint-Cloud and King George VI and Queen Elizabeth Stakes winner
- Tehran: 1944 St Leger Stakes winner. Later a leading sire in Britain and Ireland.
- Tempera: Winner of the Breeders' Cup Juvenile Fillies in 2001. Named American champion two-year-old filly for 2001
- Temperence Hill: 1980 Belmont Stakes winner, American champion 3-year-old colt
- Ten Point: 1977 Arima Kinen winner who suffered a career ending injury that ultimately proved fatal despite efforts to save his life
- Tepin: American racehorse with success in the US and Britain. 2015 Breeders' Cup Mile and 2016 Queen Anne Stakes & Woodbine Mile winner
- Tesco Boy: British-bred racehorse who later became a leading sire in Japan
- Tetratema: 1920 2000 Guineas Stakes leader. Later a leading sire in Britain and Ireland
- Texas Red: 2014 Breeders' Cup Juvenile winner
- That's the Plenty: 2003 Kikuka-shō winner
- The Bard: 1886 Preakness Stakes winner
- The Baron: 1845 St Leger Stakes winner
- The Duke: First and second winner of the Grand National
- The Finn: 1915 Belmont Stakes winner and champion 3-year-old colt. Later a leading sire in North America
- The Flying Dutchman: Winner of the Epsom Derby and St Leger Stakes in 1849, and the Ascot Gold Cup in 1850
- The General: Owned by the 10th United States president, John Tyler
- The Lambkin: 1884 St Leger Stakes winner
- The Marquis: 1862 2000 Guineas Stakes and St Leger Stakes winner
- The Merry Monarch: 1845 Epsom Derby winner
- The Minstrel: Winner of Epsom Derby, Irish Derby and King George VI and Queen Elizabeth Stakes in 1977
- The Panther: 1919 2000 Guineas Stakes winner
- The Parader: 1901 Preakness Stakes winner
- The Pizza Man: Arlington Million winner in 2015 and Northern Dancer Turf Stakes winner in 2016
- Theatrical: Irish-bred horse that won the 1987 Breeders' Cup Turf. Later a successful sire
- Theodore: 1822 St Leger Stakes winner
- Thor's Echo: 2006 Breeders' Cup Sprint winner
- Thormanby: 1860 Epsom Derby and 1861 Ascot Gold Cup winner, later a leading sire in Britain
- Thorpedo Anna: 5-time Grade I stakes winner, second 3-year-old filly to ever be named American Horse of the Year
- Throstle: 1893 Coronation Stakes and 1894 St Leger Stakes winner
- Thunder Gulch: 1995 Kentucky Derby and Belmont Stakes winner, later a leading sire in North America
- Thunderhead: 1952 2000 Guineas Stakes winner
- Tiago: 2007 Santa Anita Derby, Swaps Stakes, and Goodwood Breeders' Cup Handicap
- Tikkanen: 1994 Breeders' Cup Turf winner
- Tim Tam: 1958 Kentucky Derby and Preakness Stakes winner, later became a successful sire
- Timber Country: 1994 Breeders' Cup Juvenile and 1995 Preakness Stakes winner. 1994 American champion 2-year-old
- Tiresias: 1819 Epsom Derby winner
- Tirol: 1990 2000 Guineas Stakes and Irish 2,000 Guineas winner
- Titleholder: Winner of 3 GI races in Japan, with his win at the Takarazuka Kinen setting a course record in 2022.
- Tiz the Law: 2020 Belmont Stakes and Travers Stakes winner
- Tiznow: Two-time winner of the Breeders' Cup Classic
- To-Agori-Mou: 1981 2000 Guineas Stakes, St James's Palace Stakes, and Queen Elizabeth II Stakes winner.
- Together Forever: Irish horse that won the Fillies' Mile in 2014
- Toho Jackal: 2014 Kikuka-shō winner
- Tokai Teio: Japanese Horse of the Year of 1991. After suffering multiple injuries including a broken leg, went on to win the 1993 Arima Kinen in the famous "Miracle Run".
- Tokino Minoru: Undefeated Japanese racehorse who died from tetanus 17 days after winning the Japanese Derby in 1951
- Tom Fool: Hall of Fame racehorse, named American Horse of the Year in 1953. Later became a leading sire, including of Buckpasser, Tim Tam, and Tompion
- Tom Ochiltree: 1875 Preakness Stakes winner, American champion 3-year old in 1875, American champion older horse in 1876
- Tom Rolfe: 1965 Preakness Stakes winner
- Tompion: Multiple-stakes winning horse, including Blue Grass Stakes and Santa Anita Derby
- Tomy Lee: 1959 Kentucky Derby winner
- Tonalist: Winner of 2014 Belmont Stakes, and two-time winner of the Jockey Club Gold Cup
- Tony Bin: Irish-bred winner of the 1988 Prix de l'Arc de Triomphe and leading sire in Japan, sired Air Groove, Winning Ticket, and Jungle Pocket
- Torquator Tasso: 2020 Grosser Preis von Berlin, 2021 Grosser Preis von Baden and Prix de l'Arc de Triomphe winner, three-time German Horse of the Year
- Tosen Jordan: 2011 Autumn Tennō Shō winner
- Tosho Boy: 1976 Japanese Horse of the Year with 10 wins in 15 starts, including the 1976 Satsuki Shō, 1976 Arima Kinen, and 1977 Takarazuka Kinen; sire of Mr. C. B.
- Tosmah: Champion filly as a two and three-year-old in 1963 and 1964
- Touch Gold: 1997 Belmont Stakes winner
- Touching Wood: 1982 St Leger Stakes and Irish St. Leger winner. Successful sire
- Touchstone: 1834 St Leger Stakes and 1836 & 1837 Ascot Gold Cup winner. Influential sire in Britain and Ireland after racing.
- Toulon: 1991 St Leger Stakes winner
- Tourist: 2016 Breeders' Cup Mile winner
- Tracery: 1912 St Leger Stakes winner, successful sire in Britain and Argentina after racing.
- Tranquil: 1923 1000 Guineas Stakes and St Leger Stakes winner
- Trigo: 1929 Epsom Derby, St Leger Stakes, and Irish St. Leger winner
- Trophonius: 1811 2000 Guineas Stakes winner
- Trot Thunder: 1995 Mile Championship and 1996 Yasuda Kinen winner
- Troutbeck: 1906 Sussex Stakes and St Leger Stakes winner.
- Troy: 1979 Epsom Derby and Irish Derby winner
- Tudor Minstrel: 1947 2000 Guineas Stakes and St James's Palace Stakes winner
- Tuesday: Irish horse that won the Epsom Oaks and Breeders' Cup Filly & Mare Turf in 2022
- Tulyar: 1952 Epsom Derby and St Leger Stakes winner
- Turcoman: 1827 2000 Guineas Stakes winner
- Turkhan: 1940 Irish Derby and St Leger Stakes winner
- Turn-To: British-born American-trained horse, successful sire. Sire of Hail To Reason
- Tuscalee: Steeplechaser and all-time record holder for most wins in a season, and for most steeplechase wins overall
- Twenty Grand: Winner of the Kentucky Derby, Belmont, and Travers Stakes, also was champion 3-year-old and Horse of the Year of 1931
- Twilight Ridge: Winner of the 1985 Breeders' Cup Juvenile Fillies
- Twin Turbo: Japanese racehorse and winner of the 1993 Sankei Sho All Comers, best known for his extreme front-running style
- Two Lea: Successful broodmare and filly winner of the Hollywood Gold Cup
- Typhoon II: 1897 Kentucky Derby winner
- Tyrant (UK): British horse that won the 1802 Epsom Derby
- Tyrant (US): American horse that won the 1885 Belmont Stakes

=== U ===
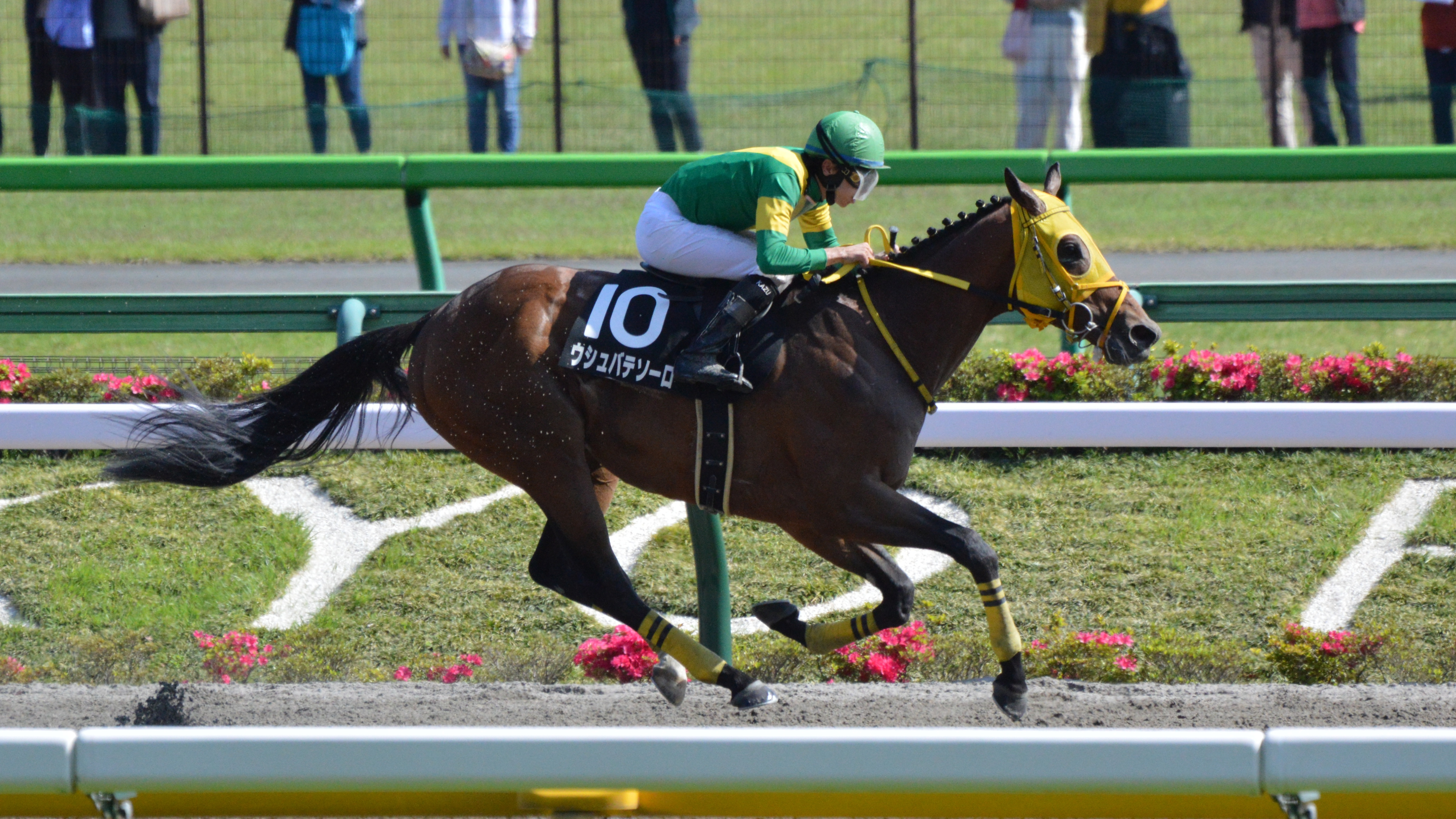
Ushba Tesoro

- U S Navy Flag: 2017 Middle Park Stakes and Dewhurst Stakes winner, and 2018 July Cup winner. Cartier Champion Two-year-old Colt for 2017.
- Unbreakable: Grandsire of great Native Dancer
- Unbridled: Winner of the Kentucky Derby and Breeders' Cup Classic and sire of the champion sire Unbridled's Song
- Unbridled's Song: Breeders' Cup Juvenile winner, and sire of the great Arrogate
- Unrivaled Belle: 2010 Breeders' Cup Ladies' Classic winner
- Untapable: 2014 Breeders' Cup Distaff winner and American champion 3-year-old filly
- Uncle Mo: 2010 Breeders' Cup Juvenile winner, sire of several Grade 1 stakes winners
- Union Rags: 2012 Belmont Stakes winner
- Urban Chic: 2024 Kikuka-shō winner
- User Friendly: 1992 Epsom Oaks, Irish Oaks, Yorkshire Oaks, and St Leger Stakes, and 1993 Grand Prix de Saint-Cloud winner. Cartier Horse of the Year and Champion Three-year-old Filly for 1993
- Ushba Tesoro: Winner of the 2023 Dubai World Cup

=== V ===
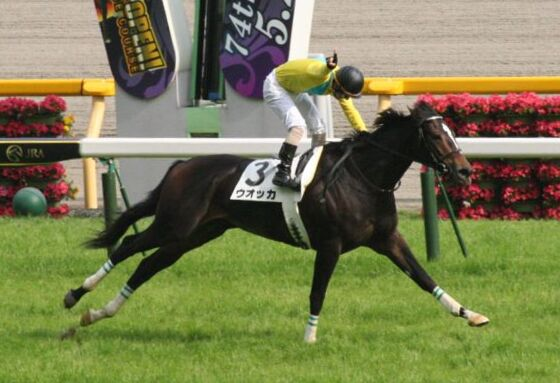
Vodka

- Vagrant: 1876 Kentucky Derby winner, first gelding to win the Kentucky Derby
- Vain: Champion front runner; great, great grandsire of Black Caviar
- Val Royal: French-bred horse that won the 2001 Breeders' Cup Mile
- Vale of York: Irish horse that won the Breeders' Cup Juvenile in 2009
- Valencia: 1975 Indonesia Derby Winner
- Vanguard: American racehorse that won the 1882 Preakness Stakes
- Varenne: Italy's most famous harness horse
- Vedas: 1905 2000 Guineas Stakes winner
- Vedette: 1857 2000 Guineas Stakes winner. Major sire after racing.
- Vega: Oka Shō and Yushun Himba winner in 1993. Dam of Admire Vega
- Venetian Way: 1960 Kentucky Derby winner
- Ventura: Winner of the Breeders' Cup Filly & Mare Sprint in 2008
- Vequist: 2020 Breeders' Cup Juvenile Fillies winner
- Vermillion: Won 9 G1/Jpn1 Japanese dirt races, including the 2007 Japan Cup Dirt
- Verxina: Two-time winner of the Victoria Mile
- Very Subtle: 1987 Breeders' Cup Sprint winner
- Victoire Pisa: Winner of the 2010 Satsuki Shō and Arima Kinen, first Japanese-trained racehorse to win the Dubai World Cup
- Victorian: 1928 Preakness Stakes winner
- Victory Gallop: Canadian-bred horse that won the 1998 Belmont Stakes
- Vigil II: 1923 Preakness Stakes winner
- Vindication: 2002 Breeders' Cup Juvenile winner
- Vino Rosso: 2019 Breeders Cup winner
- Vito: 1928 Belmont Stakes winner
- Vivlos: 2016 Shūka Shō winner
- Vo Rouge: Fast frontrunner and 3-time winner of the C F Orr Stakes, had the Vo Rogue Plate named in his honor
- Vodka: First filly in 64 years to win the Tokyo Yushun (Japanese Derby) in 2007, with seven total Grade 1 wins in Japan
- Volodyovski: 1901 Epsom Derby winner
- Volponi: 2002 Breeders' Cup Classic winner
- Voltaire: Winner of the 1828 Doncaster Gold Cup
- Voltigeur: Won the Epsom Derby and the St Leger Stakes in 1850 and beat The Flying Dutchman in the Doncaster Cup; was subsequently beaten in 1851 by The Flying Dutchman in a widely-known head-to-head race known as The Great Match

=== W ===
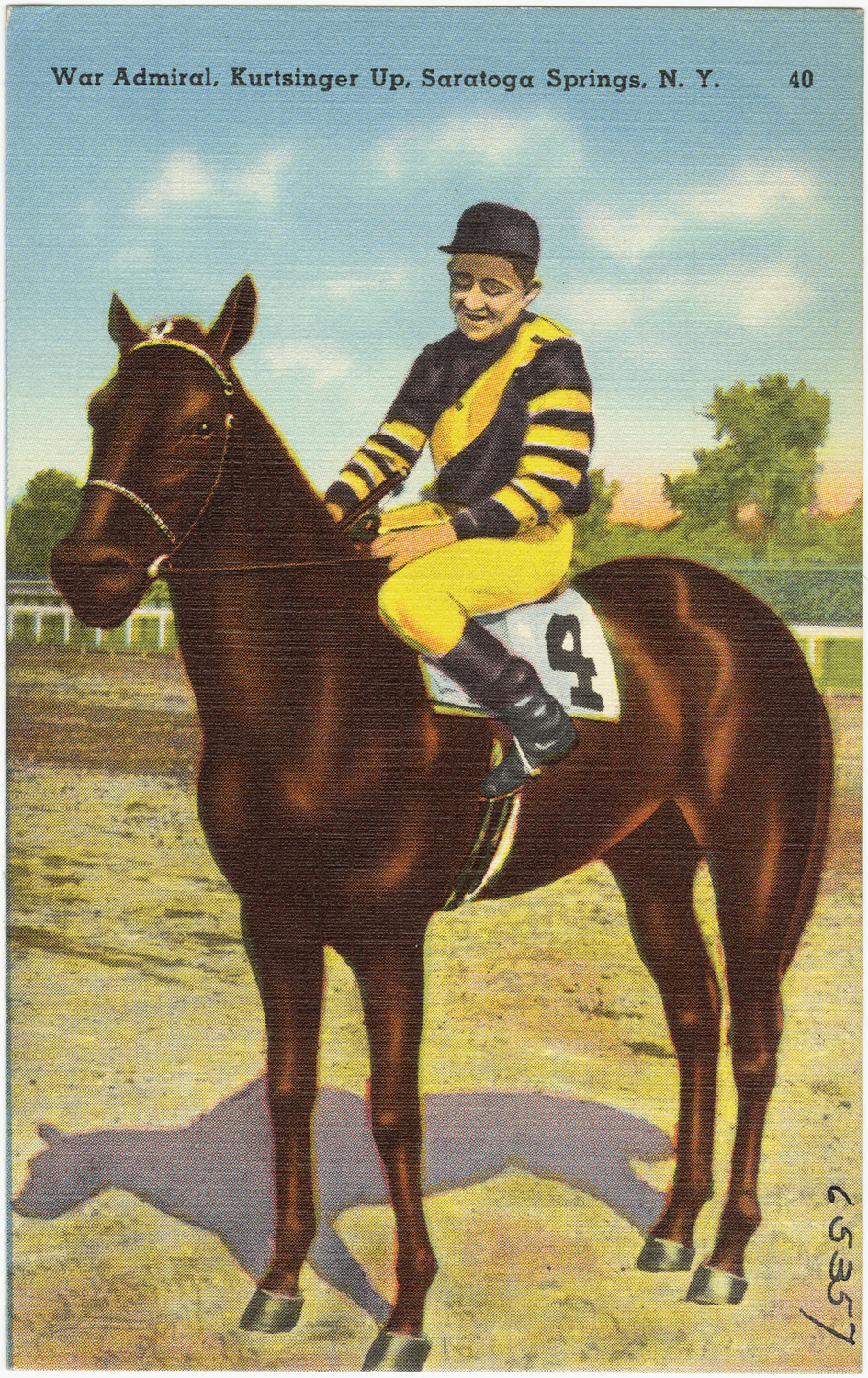
War Admiral

- Wando: Winner of the Canadian Triple Crown in 2003
- War Admiral: Fourth U.S. Triple Crown winner (1937)
- War Chant: 2000 Breeders' Cup Mile winner
- War Cloud: British-bred horse that won the 1918 Preakness Stakes, first horse to compete in all three American Triple Crown races
- War Emblem: 2002 Kentucky Derby and Preakness Stakes winner
- War Like Goddess: Multiple graded stakes winner, most notably the 2021 Flower Bowl Stakes
- War of Will: Winner of 2019 Preakness Stakes
- War Pass: 2007 Breeders' Cup Juvenile and Champagne Stakes winner
- Warlock: 1856 St Leger Stakes winner
- Watervale: 1911 Preakness Stakes winner
- Watling Street: 1942 Epsom Derby winner
- Waxy: 1793 Epsom Derby winner and influential sire
- Weekend Surprise: mutli-time race winner, later a successful broodmare and dam of A.P. Indy
- West Australian: First horse to win the English Triple Crown (1853). Also won Ascot Gold Cup in 1854
- Whalebone: 1810 Epsom Derby winner, major sire in Britain and Ireland
- What a Pleasure: A leading sire in North America in the 1970s
- Whimsical: 1906 Preakness Stakes winner
- Whirlaway: Fifth American Triple Crown winner
- Whisk Broom II: First of four horses ever to win the New York Handicap Triple
- Whisker: 1815 Epsom Derby winner
- Whiskery: 1927 Kentucky Derby winner
- Whistlejacket: Marquess of Rockingham's racehorse; painted by G. Stubbs (1762)
- White Abarrio: Winner of Florida Derby, Whitney Stakes, Breeders' Cup Classic, and Pegasus World Cup
- Whitmore: 2020 Breeders' Cup Sprint winner, American champion sprint horse
- Wicked Whisper: 2019 Frizette Stakes winner
- Wild Again: Winner of inaugural Breeders' Cup Classic
- Wild Dayrell: 1855 Epsom Derby winner
- Wildfowler: 1898 St Leger Stakes winner
- Wilko: 2004 Breeders' Cup Juvenile winner
- William: 1814 St Leger Stakes winner
- Win Marilyn: 2022 Hong Kong Vase winner
- Win Variation: 2011 Aoba Sho and 2014 Nikkei Sho winner
- Windsor Lad: Winner of the Epsom Derby and St Leger Stakes in 1934, Coronation Cup and Eclipse Stakes in 1935
- Wings of Eagles: 2017 Epsom Derby winner
- Winning Colors: Third filly to win the Kentucky Derby (1988)
- Winning Ticket: 1993 Tokyo Yūshun winner
- Wintergreen: 1909 Kentucky Derby winner
- Winx: Winner of 33 consecutive starts, including the Cox Plate four times
- Wise Dan: Two-time American Horse of the Year (2012, 2013); won Breeders' Cup Mile twice (same years)
- Wishing Well: Dam of Sunday Silence
- Wizard: Winner of the inaugural 2000 Guineas Stakes in 1809
- Wollow: 1976 2000 Guineas Stakes, Eclipse Stakes, and Sussex Stakes winner
- Wonder Acute: Oldest horse to win a Japanese Grade 1 race at age nine when he won the Kashiwa Kinen
- Wonder Wheel: 2022 Breeders' Cup Juvenile Fillies winner
- Wool Winder: 1907 St Leger Stakes and Sussex Stakes winner
- Work All Week: 2014 Breeders' Cup Sprint winner, American champion sprint horse
- Workforce: 2010 Epsom Derby and Prix de l'Arc de Triomphe winner
- World Approval: Multiple-grade 1 stakes winner, most notably 2017 Breeders' Cup Mile
- World Premiere: 2019 Kikuka-shō and 2021 Spring Tennō Shō winner
- Worth: 1912 Kentucky Derby winner
- Wuheida: British horse that won the Prix Marcel Boussac in 2016 and the Breeders' Cup Filly & Mare Turf in 2017

=== X ===
- Xaar: Winner of Prix de Cabourg (1997), Prix de la Salamandre (1997)
- Xtra Heat: Champion 3-year-old filly of 2001, and the only filly to win the Endine stakes twice

=== Y ===
- Yaeno Muteki: Winner of the Satsuki Shō in 1988 and the Autumn Tennō Shō in 1990
- Yamanin Zephyr: Two-time winner of the Yasuda Kinen (1992, 1993) and winner of the 1993 Tennō Shō (Autumn)
- Yeats: Only horse ever to win 4 Ascot Gold Cups, also won 3 other group 1 races
- Yibir: British-bred horse that won the 2021 Breeders' Cup Turf and earned American champion male turf horse honors
- Young Eclipse: 1781 Epsom Derby winner
- Young Traveller: 1791 St Leger Stakes winner
- Your Host: Winner of 1950 Santa Anita Derby, 1951 Santa Catalina Handicap, sire of the great Kelso
- Your Majesty: 1908 St Leger Stakes, Sussex Stakes, and St James's Palace Stakes winner. Later a leading sire in Argentina.
- Yukino Bijin: Popular Japanese horse despite only winning the grade-3 Queen Stakes

=== Z ===
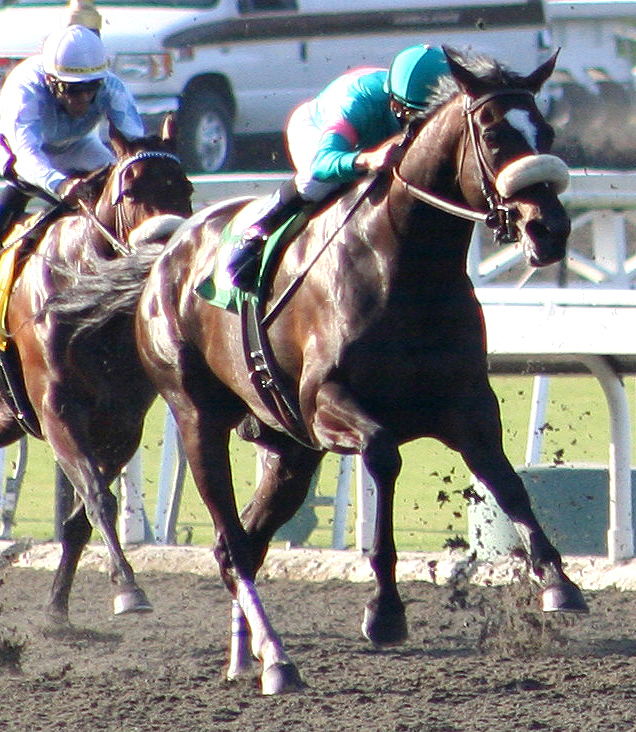
Zenyatta

- Zabeel: New Zealand sire of Octagonal and Vengeance of Rain
- Zaccio: Three-time winner of the Outstanding Steeplechase horse award in the 80s
- Zafonic: 1992 Prix de la Salamandre and 1993 2000 Guineas Stakes winner. Cartier Champion Two-year-old Colt for 1992
- Zagora: French-bred horse that won the Breeders' Cup Filly & Mare Turf in 2012
- Zenno Rob Roy: The only horse since T. M. Opera O to have won the Autumn Tennō Shō, Japan Cup, and the Arima Kinen within the same year (collectively known in Japan as the Autumn Triple Crown); also holds the speed record and longest standing record in the JRA for the Arima Kinen at 2:29.5
- Zenyatta: Won 19 of 20 starts; first mare to win the Breeders' Cup Classic (2009); first to win two different Breeders' Cup races (Ladies' Classic in 2008, Classic in 2009)
- Zev: Winner of the Belmont Stakes and the Kentucky Derby, as well as winner of a match race against Epsom Derby winner Papyrus
- Zieten: American-bred French-trained horse that won multiple graded stakes, most notable the Group 1 Middle Park Stakes in 1992
- Zino: 1982 2000 Guineas Stakes winner
- Zippy Chippy: Infamous for racing 100 times and losing every single time
- Zulu Alpha: 2020 Pegasus World Cup Turf Invitational winner

== See also ==
- List of leading Thoroughbred racehorses
- American Horse of the Year
- Australian Champion Racehorse of the Year
- New Zealand Horse of the Year
- Equine recipients of the Dickin Medal
- Old Friends Equine
- Wonder Horses
