= Mother Goose (horse) =

American Thoroughbred racehorse and broodmare

- Sire: Chicle
- Grandsire: Spearmint
- Dam: Flying Witch
- Damsire: Broomstick
- Sex: Mare
- Foaled: 1922
- Country: United States
- Colour: Brown
- Breeder: Harry Payne Whitney
- Owner: Harry Payne Whitney
- Trainer: Fred Hopkins
- Record: 10: 3-1-3
- Earnings: US$72,755

Major wins
- Belmont Futurity Stakes (1924); Fashion Stakes (1924)

Awards
- American Co-Champion Two-Year-Old Filly (1924)

Honors
- Mother Goose Stakes at Belmont Park

Mother Goose (foaled 1922 in Kentucky) was an American Thoroughbred racehorse who was named the American Co-Champion Two-Year-Old Filly of 1924. From the 128 runnings of the Belmont Futurity Stakes since its inception in 1888 through 2019, Mother Goose is one of only thirteen fillies to have ever won the event. The Mother Goose Stakes at New York's Belmont Park is named in her honor.

== Breeding ==
A Harry Whitney homebred, Mother Goose was a full brother to Whichone, himself an American Champion Two-Year-Old Colt who also won the Belmont Futurity in 1929. Their sire was Chicle who was bred and foaled in France by their American owner due to the complete shutdown of horseracing in 1911 and 1912 in the State of New York as a result of the Legislature's passage of the Hart–Agnew Law. Brought to the United States by owner/breeder Harry Whitney, Chicle would become the Leading sire in North America in 1929 and the Leading broodmare sire in North America in 1942. Chicle was the son of Spearmint, winner of the Epsom Derby in England and the Grand Prix de Paris in France, both races the then most prestigious in their country. Spearmint became an outstanding sire whose progeny included Johren, Plucky Liege Royal Lancer, Spion Kop. Jockey Danny Maher, U. S. Racing Hall of Fame inductee and twice the British flat racing Champion Jockey was quoted as saying that Spearmint was the best horse he ever rode. Spearmint's sire Carbine was a New Zealand Racing Hall of Fame and Australian Racing Hall of Fame inductee.

Chicle won the 1915 Champagne Stakes in fast time beating a field of six other runners including Friar Rock who in 1916 would be named American Horse of the Year. Chicle beat Friar Rock again in the 1916 Brooklyn Derby.

The dam of Mother Goose, and Whichone, was the unraced Flying Witch. She was a daughter of the three time Leading sire and U.S. Racing Hall of Fame inductee Broomstick who in turn was sired by Ben Brush, twice a U.S. National Champion runner and Leading Sire as well as a U.S. Racing Hall of Fame inductee.

== 1924: Two-year-old season ==
Several times during 1924 Mother Goose would go head-to-head with her stablemate Maud Muller, a filly who was also bred and owned by Harry Whitney. Trained by Fred Hopkins, the two fillies would share American Co-Champion Two-Year-Old Filly honors.

Mother Goose got her first career win on April 24, 1924, in a four and a half furlong event for two-year-old maiden fillies at Havre de Grace Racetrack. Ridden by Linus McAtee she won by two lengths, easily defeating six other runners while breaking the track record by two-fifths of a second.

At Jamaica Race Course, Mother Goose ran third in the May 13 Rosedale Stakes under future Hall of Fame jockey Ivan Parke. A rarity in racing, the winner Maud Miller, runner-up Swinging, and third-place finisher Mother Goose all had the same owner and trainer.

On May 25, Mother Goose earned first place money of $4,925 for winning the five furlong Fashion Stakes at Belmont Park under jockey Jimmy Burke beating stablemate Maud Muller by 1½ lengths in a field of seven.

At Aqueduct Racetrack Mother Goose ran second to stablemate Maud Muller in the July 4 Astoria Stakes run at five furlongs.

For the field of twenty-nine juveniles competing in the September 14 Belmont Futurity Stakes, it would be the most important event of the year. The purse was worth almost 13 times the amount Mother Goose has received for her win in the Fashion Stakes. Run at a distance of 6 furlongs, jockey Linus McAtee positioned the filly well. As they came into the homestretch, Mother Goose was running second to J. Edwin Griffith's Single Foot, a very good colt who had already won several top stakes on Maryland racetracks. Taking the lead, Mother Goose held off a strong charge from Marshall Field's Pimlico Futurity winner Stimulus to take the $65,730 first place money by a head.

From ten starts in 1924, Mother Goose ended her two-year-old campaign with a record of 3–1–3. She had earnings of $72,755 which ranked second in the United States to Master Charlie.

== 1925: Three-year-old season ==
On April 16 the Daily Racing Form reported that Mother Goose was being trained in Maryland for participation in the 1925 Kentucky Derby to be run May 16. She was also nominated for the May 30 Kentucky Oaks, and for the Preakness Stakes which in 1925 would be run eight days prior to the Kentucky Derby. Mother Goose did not run in any of these events and would end her career without racing as a three-year-old.

== Broodmare legacy ==
Mother Goose was sent to Whitney Farm near Lexington, Kentucky to stand as a broodmare. While none of her progeny made an impact in racing, her daughter Arbitrator by Peace Chance was the dam of Almahmoud who was bred by Harry Whitney's son, Cornelius Vanderbilt Whitney. Almahmoud holds an important place in Thoroughbred breeding as the dam of both Cosmah and Natalma. Cosmah was a top quality broodmare whose progeny includes Halo. Natalma was the dam of legendary sire and sire of sires Northern Dancer.

== Pedigree ==
Pedigree of Mother Goose, brown filly, 1922
Sire Chicle (FR)	Spearmint	Carbine	Musket
Sire Chicle (FR)	Spearmint	Carbine	Mersey
Sire Chicle (FR)	Spearmint	Maid of the Mint	Minting
Sire Chicle (FR)	Spearmint	Maid of the Mint	Warble
Sire Chicle (FR)	Lady Hamburg	Hamburg	Hanover
Sire Chicle (FR)	Lady Hamburg	Hamburg	Lady Reel
Sire Chicle (FR)	Lady Hamburg	Lady Frivoles	St. Simon
Sire Chicle (FR)	Lady Hamburg	Lady Frivoles	Gay Duchess
Dam Flying Witch (USA)	Broomstick	Ben Brush	Bramble
Dam Flying Witch (USA)	Broomstick	Ben Brush	Roseville
Dam Flying Witch (USA)	Broomstick	Elf	Galliard
Dam Flying Witch (USA)	Broomstick	Elf	Sylvabelle
Dam Flying Witch (USA)	Fly By Night	Peter Pan	Commando
Dam Flying Witch (USA)	Fly By Night	Peter Pan	Cinderella
Dam Flying Witch (USA)	Fly By Night	Dazzling	St. Leonards
Dam Flying Witch (USA)	Fly By Night	Dazzling	Splendour (family: 2-d)
