= Steady Aim =

British-bred Thoroughbred racehorse

- Sire: Felstead
- Grandsire: Spion Kop
- Dam: Quick Arrow
- Damsire: Casterari
- Sex: Mare
- Foaled: 1943
- Country: United Kingdom
- Colour: Bay
- Breeder: Alfred Butt
- Owner: Alfred Butt
- Trainer: Frank Butters

Major wins
- Epsom Oaks (1946)

Steady Aim (1943 – after 1966) was a British Thoroughbred racehorse and broodmare best known for her win in the 1946 Epsom Oaks. After winning one minor race as a juvenile she showed improved form in the following spring to finish third in a very competitive trial race Hurst Park and then came home an easy winner of the Oaks in June. Her racing career was ended by injury soon afterwards. As a broodmare she produced several good winners and was the female-line ancestor of the leading stallion Danzig.

== Background ==
Steady Aim was a bay mare with a narrow white blaze and a white sock on her right hind leg bred in England by her owner, Sir Alfred Butt. She was sent into training with Frank Butters at the Fitzroy House stable in Newmarket, Suffolk.

She was from one of the last crops of foals sired by Felstead who won the Epsom Derby in 1928. He was not a great success as a breeding stallion, but did sire the outstanding racemare Rockfel. Steady Aim's dam Quick Arrow was a French-bred mare who raced with modest success in France and England and was bought by Alfred Butt for 700 guineas in 1941. Her dam Quick Change was an influential broodmare whose other descendants included Kris Kin and the Prix de l'Arc de Triomphe winner Topyo.

== Racing career ==
=== 1945: two-year-old season ===
Steady Aim made little impact as a two-year-old in 1945 but she did record one success in a minor race.

=== 1946: three-year-old season ===
In April 1946 Steady Aim contested the Katheryn Howard Stakes over seven furlongs at Hurst Park and finished third behind Neolight and Hypericum. Her performance looked much more creditable after the 1000 Guineas at Newmarket Racecourse, which saw Hypericum win by one and a half lengths with Neolight in second place. On 7 of June at Epsom Racecourse Steady Aim was ridden by Harry Wragg and started at odds 7/1 for the 168th running of the Oaks Stakes over one and a half miles. The best of her nine rivals appeared to be Hypericum and the Lingfield Oaks Trial winner Iona. Steady Aim won easily by three lengths from Iona with a gap of three lengths back to Nelia in third place and Hypericum in fourth.

Steady Aim never raced again: she was being prepared for a run in the St Leger Stakes when she sustained a training injury and was retired from racing.

== Assessment and honours ==
In their book, A Century of Champions, based on the Timeform rating system, John Randall and Tony Morris rated Steady Aim an "average" winner of the Oaks.

== Breeding record ==
At the end of her racing career, Steady Aim was retired to become a broodmare. She produced at least thirteen foal and eight winners.

- King's Prize, a colt, foaled in 1949, sired by Big Game. Won two races.
- Ashburton, colt (later gelded), 1950, by Big Game. Failed to win a race.
- Immortal, dark bay or brown colt, 1951, by Dante. Won five races including the Newbury Spring Cup.
- Petitioner, bay filly, 1952, by Petition. Winner. Dam of Pas de Nom who in turn produced Danzig
- Roman Conquest, colt (gelded), 1953, by Nearco. Won Cornwallis Stakes.
- Objective, colt, 1954, by Nearco. Failed to win a race.
- Legal Shot, colt, 1955, by Petition. Winner.
- Nous Verrons, colt (gelded), 1957, by Nearco. Won three races.
- Sure Shot, bay filly, 1958, by Court Martial. Won three races.
- Aim High, colt, 1960, by Grey Sovereign. Failed to win a race.
- First Dawn, filly, 1962, by High Treason. Unraced.
- Telling, brown filly, 1963, by High Treason. Winner.
- Quick Aim, bay filly, 1966, by Pardal. Failed to win a race.

== Pedigree ==
Pedigree of Steady Aim (GB), bay mare, 1943
Sire Felstead (GB) 1925	Spion Kop (GB); 1917	Spearmint	Carbine (NZ)
Sire Felstead (GB) 1925	Spion Kop (GB); 1917	Spearmint	Maid of the Mint
Sire Felstead (GB) 1925	Spion Kop (GB); 1917	Hammerkop	Gallinule
Sire Felstead (GB) 1925	Spion Kop (GB); 1917	Hammerkop	Concussion
Sire Felstead (GB) 1925	Felkington (GB); 1918	Lemberg	Cyllene
Sire Felstead (GB) 1925	Felkington (GB); 1918	Lemberg	Galicia
Sire Felstead (GB) 1925	Felkington (GB); 1918	Comparison	William the Third
Sire Felstead (GB) 1925	Felkington (GB); 1918	Comparison	Combine
Dam Quick Arrow (FR) 1937	Casterari (FR); 1930	Fiterari	Sardanapale
Dam Quick Arrow (FR) 1937	Casterari (FR); 1930	Fiterari	Miss Bachelor (IRE)
Dam Quick Arrow (FR) 1937	Casterari (FR); 1930	Castleline (GB)	Son-in-Law
Dam Quick Arrow (FR) 1937	Casterari (FR); 1930	Castleline (GB)	Castelline
Dam Quick Arrow (FR) 1937	Quick Change (GB); 1924	Hurry On	Marcovil
Dam Quick Arrow (FR) 1937	Quick Change (GB); 1924	Hurry On	Toute Suite
Dam Quick Arrow (FR) 1937	Quick Change (GB); 1924	Broderie	Tracery (USA)
Dam Quick Arrow (FR) 1937	Quick Change (GB); 1924	Broderie	Princess Sonia (Family 7-a)
