= Whichone =

American Thoroughbred racehorse

- Sire: Chicle
- Grandsire: Spearmint
- Dam: Flying Witch
- Damsire: Broomstick
- Sex: Stallion
- Foaled: 1927
- Country: United States
- Color: Brown
- Breeder: Harry Payne Whitney
- Owner: Harry Payne Whitney
- Trainer: James G. Rowe Jr. (1929); T. J. Healey (1930)
- Record: 14: 10-2-1
- Earnings: US$192,705

Major wins
- Champagne Stakes (1929); Belmont Futurity Stakes (1929); Saratoga Special Stakes (1929); Ballot Handicap (1930); Miller Stakes (1930); Saranac Handicap (1930); Whitney Stakes (1930); Withers Stakes (1930)

Awards
- American Champion Two-Year-Old Colt (1929)

Whichone (1927–1944) was an American Thoroughbred racehorse who was named the American Champion Two-Year-Old Colt of 1929. Although Whichone earned important race wins as a three-year-old, injuries hampered his racing career including a bowed tendon sustained in the running of the 1930 Travers Stakes that ended his career.

== Background ==
A Harry Payne Whitney homebred, Whichone was a full brother to Mother Goose, herself an American Champion Two-Year-Old Filly in 1924. Their sire was Chicle who was bred and foaled in France by their American owner due to the complete shutdown of horseracing in 1911 and 1912 in the state of New York as a result of the Legislature's passage of the Hart–Agnew Law. Brought to the United States by owner/breeder Harry Payne Whitney, Chicle would become the Leading sire in North America in 1929 and the Leading broodmare sire in North America in 1942. Chicle was the son of Spearmint, winner of the Epsom Derby in England and the Grand Prix de Paris in France, both races the then most prestigious in their country. Spearmint became the outstanding sire whose progeny included Johren, Plucky Liege Royal Lancer, Spion Kop. Danny Maher, U. S. Racing Hall of Fame inductee and twice the British flat racing Champion Jockey was quoted as saying that Spearmint was the best horse he ever rode. Spearmint's sire Carbine was a New Zealand Racing Hall of Fame and Australian Racing Hall of Fame inductee.

Chicle won the 1915 Champagne Stakes in fast time beating a field of six other runners including Friar Rock who in 1916 would be named American Horse of the Year. Chicle beat Friar Rock again in the 1916 Brooklyn Derby.

The dam of Whichone, and Mother Goose, was the unraced Flying Witch. She was a daughter of the three time Leading sire and U.S. Racing Hall of Fame inductee Broomstick who in turn was sired by Ben Brush, twice a U.S. National Champion runner and Leading Sire as well as a U.S. Racing Hall of Fame inductee.

== 1929: Two-year-old season ==
Trained by Jimmy Rowe Jr. and ridden by Linus McAtee, in 1929 the two-year-old Whichone had wins in three stakes races. His first came in the August 10 Saratoga Special Stakes at Saratoga Race Course where he won by six lengths in beating eight other juveniles. On August 31, Whichone finished second in the Hopeful Stakes to his H. P. Whitney owned stablemate Boojum. The colt's biggest win would come on September 9 in the Belmont Futurity. In a field of 17, Whichone defeated Hi-Jack by four lengths with Gallant Fox another 1/2 length further back. Not only was the Futurity the richest race anywhere in the world, Whichone earned $100,730 marking the first time in American history any horse had earned $100,000 for first place money. The win cemented Whichone's two-year-old Champion honors. Whichone's final stakes win of 1929 came in the Champagne Stakes, a race won by his sire Chicle in 1915. For his efforts, Whichone earned $5,825, a minuscule purse compared to the Futurity. but one that would prove costly because the colt came out of the race with an injury that would keep him out of the 1930 Kentucky Derby won by Gallant Fox who he had easily beaten by 6 1/2 lengths in the Futurity.

== 1930: Three-year-old season ==
T. J. Healey, the Whitney stable's head trainer took over Whichone's race conditioning for his three-year-old campaign. Jimmy Rowe Jr. become head trainer for Greentree Stable belonging to Harry Whitney's sister-in-law, Helen Hay Whitney.

By early May 1930, Whichone's injury seemed behind him and he was back in training. In mid May it was reported the colt appeared sound and was scheduled to make his first start of the year on May 31 in the one mile Withers Stakes at Belmont Park. In a tune-up race for the 1930 Belmont Stakes Whichone showed very good form with an easy win in the May 28 Ballot Handicap over one mile at Belmont Park. Three days later, on a slow Belmont Park track, Whichone almost leisurely captured the May 31 Withers Stakes by four lengths in the slow time of 1:38 1/5 for the mile. Under instructions from trainer Healey, jockey Raymond Workman continued running for another quarter mile in preparation for the mile and one-half Belmont Stakes.

A June 3, 1930 Daily Racing Form story on the upcoming 1930 Belmont Stakes reported on the opinion of various horsemen as to whether it would be Whichone or Gallant Fox that would come out on top. The consensus was that Whichone would be the victor, the DRF stating it was important to note that for the most part the votes for the Whitney colt came from trainers and jockeys while those supporting Gallant Fox were handicappers and others who closely study horseracing. Among those jockeys and trainers who chose Whichone were future Hall of Fame inductees Laverne Fator, Mack Garner, Max Hirsch, Willie Knapp, and "Dick" Thompson. The Belmont would be Whichone's third start in 11 days and he finished second in a field of just four runners. On a track rated only as good, Whichone struggled until they made the turn for home but his challenge was not enough to catch Gallant Fox who won easily by three lengths and becoming the second horse to win the U.S. Triple Crown.

Scheduled to compete against Gallant Fox again in the June 28 Dwyer Stakes, yet again Whichone came up with another injury and had to be scratched. The quartercrack in a forefoot kept the colt out of racing until the August 6 Saranac Handicap at the Saratoga Race Course. Described as a "brilliant comeback" by the Brooklyn Daily Eagle, Whichone not only won with ease, he ran the mile in the fastest time of the racing season. Just three days later, Whichone got another easy win in the Whitney Stakes. Simply galloping over the finishing line he still won by four lengths. With all eyes watching the popular colt for any signs of leg trouble, the Form Chart for the mile and one-quarter race took an unusual step with a statement that said "He pulled up sound."

Once again, three days after that win, Whichone ran in the August 12 Miller Stakes as a final prep for the very important Travers Stakes in which he would be certain to meet Gallant Fox again. Whichone earned a third straight win in the 41st running of the Miller Stakes at Saratoga. He did it in the very fast time of 1:56 2/5 for a mile and three-sixteenths which broke the stakes record set by Enfilade in 1918 and equaled by the legendary Man o' War in 1920.

=== The Jim Dandy Travers ===
In what would become the most talked about upset in American Thoroughbred racing folklore, a 100 to 1 longshot named Jim Dandy won the August 16, 1930, Travers Stakes beating runner-up Gallant Fox by six lengths. Whichone finished five lengths further back in third being pulled up by jockey Raymond Workman when he knew the horse was seriously hurt. This latest injury turned out to be a career-ending bowed tendon.

== At stud ==
Harry Whitney died on October 26, 1930, and his horse racing stable and stud farm would be passed on to his son Cornelius Vanderbilt "Sonny" Whitney.

Whichone was retired to stand at Whitney's Kentucky stud farm beginning in 1931. While he would never sire any runner that was even remotely close to being his equal on the racetrack, he did produce several that met with some success. From Whichone's first crop in 1932, a colt bred and retained by Sonny Whitney named Today looked very promising after he won the 1935 Wood Memorial Stakes by three lengths. Among a field of 12, that the New York Times described as "the most formidable eligibles" for the Kentucky Derby, were Plat Eye owned by the Greentree Stable, the Brookmeade Stable colt Psychic Bid, William Ziegler Jr.'s very good filly Esposa, who would become the 1937 and 1938 American Champion Older Female Horse, and Omaha, a son of Whichone's great rival Gallant Fox.

Other of Whichone's progeny who met with some success in racing included winners:
Whichcee (1934) gelding : San Francisco Handicap, Los Angeles Handicap, San Antonio Handicap
Bourbon King (1935) colt : Remsen Stakes, Chesapeake Stakes
Handcuff (1935) filly : Wakefield Stakes, Acorn Stakes, Alabama Stakes, Delaware Oaks
Triplane (1935) gelding: Longacres Mile Handicap

== Sire line tree ==
- Whichone
  - Today
  - Ptolemy
    - Simple Samson
  - Whichcee
  - Bourbon King
  - Triplane

== Pedigree ==
Pedigree of Whichone, brown colt, 1927
Sire Chicle (FR)	Spearmint (GB)	Carbine	Musket
Sire Chicle (FR)	Spearmint (GB)	Carbine	Mersey
Sire Chicle (FR)	Spearmint (GB)	Maid of the Mint	Minting
Sire Chicle (FR)	Spearmint (GB)	Maid of the Mint	Warble
Sire Chicle (FR)	Lady Hamburg (USA)	Hamburg	Hanover
Sire Chicle (FR)	Lady Hamburg (USA)	Hamburg	Lady Reel
Sire Chicle (FR)	Lady Hamburg (USA)	Lady Frivoles	St. Simon
Sire Chicle (FR)	Lady Hamburg (USA)	Lady Frivoles	Gay Duchess
Dam Flying Witch (USA)	Broomstick (USA)	Ben Brush	Bramble
Dam Flying Witch (USA)	Broomstick (USA)	Ben Brush	Roseville
Dam Flying Witch (USA)	Broomstick (USA)	Elf	Galliard
Dam Flying Witch (USA)	Broomstick (USA)	Elf	Sylvabelle
Dam Flying Witch (USA)	Fly By Night (USA)	Peter Pan	Commando
Dam Flying Witch (USA)	Fly By Night (USA)	Peter Pan	Cinderella
Dam Flying Witch (USA)	Fly By Night (USA)	Dazzling	St. Leonards
Dam Flying Witch (USA)	Fly By Night (USA)	Dazzling	Splendour (family: 1-h)
