= Rockavon =

British-bred Thoroughbred racehorse

- Sire: Rockefella
- Grandsire: Hyperion
- Dam: Cosmetic
- Damsire: Sir Cosmo
- Sex: Stallion
- Foaled: 1958
- Country: United Kingdom
- Colour: Bay
- Breeder: Biddlesden Park Stud
- Owner: Thomas Yuill
- Trainer: George Boyd
- Record: 14:5-x-x
- Earnings: £24,253

Major wins
- 2000 Guineas (1961)

Awards
- Timeform rating 120

Rockavon (foaled 1958) was a British Thoroughbred racehorse and sire, best known for winning the classic 2000 Guineas in 1961. After winning three races on minor tracks as a two-year-old and being well-beaten on his three-year-old debut Rockavon created a 66/1 upset when winning the 2000 Guineas, becoming the first horse trained in Scotland to win a classic. He subsequently only won one minor race and has been regarded as one of the least distinguished classic winners. At the end of 1961 he was retired to stud where he made no impact as a sire of winners.

== Background ==
Rockavon was a dark-coated bay horse with no white markings bred at the Biddlesden Park Stud on the border of Northamptonshire and Buckinghamshire. He was sent to the Newmarket sales as a foal in December 1958 and was bought by R. J. Donworth for 420 guineas. Ten months later Donworth sold the horse on at a profit when Rockavon was bought for 2,200 guineas by Thomas Yuill, a farmer from Strathaven. The colt was sent into training with George Boyd at his Tilton House stables near Dunbar. Boyd was one of the leading Scottish trainers of the time and had won major handicap races in England including the Lincoln and the Cambridgeshire.

Rockavon was sired by Rockefella, the only foal produced by the 1000 Guineas and Oaks winner Rockfel before her death at the age of six. Apart from Rockavon, Rockefella sired the filly Outcrop, who won the Yorkshire Oaks and the Park Hill Stakes in 1963. Rockavon was one of eight winners produced by the broodmare Cosmetic, a daughter of the July Cup winner Sir Cosmo. Cosmetic's dam Beautiful Girl was a half-sister of Aura, who produced the Doncaster Cup winner Auralia.

== Racing career ==
=== 1960:two-year-old season ===
As a two-year-old in 1960, Rockavon ran eight times at minor racecourses in Scotland and Northern England winning three races including his last two. He won the Neilsland Nursery and one other race at Hamilton Park, near Glasgow and a race at the since closed Stockton-on-Tees Racecourse in Yorkshire. In the Free Handicap, a ranking of the season's best juveniles, Rockavon did not receive a rating, suggesting that he was at least thirty pounds below the best horses of his generation.

=== 1961:three-year-old season ===
The best two-year-olds seen in Britain in 1960 had either been fillies like Opaline and Sweet Solera, or sprinters like Floribunda, suggesting that the 1961 colts' classics might be rather sub-standard. Rockavon did little to establish himself as a contender for major honours on his seasonal debut, when he finished fourth in a handicap race at Newcastle. In the 2000 Guineas over Newmarket's Rowley Mile course on 26 April he started at odds of 66/1 in a field of twenty-two runners, with Pinturischio, who had won the Wood Ditton Stakes for unraced horses at the previous Newmarket meeting, being made the 7/4 favourite. George Boyd had planned to fly to Newmarket from Scotland but was delayed by fog at Edinburgh Airport and the colt was prepared at the course by Boyd's nephew, Tommy Craig, who had travelled down in Rockavon's horse-box. Ridden by Norman Stirk, Rockavon was always well positioned, took the lead a furlong from the finish, and won by two lengths from Prince Tudor and Irish-trained Time Greine, with Pinturischio in fourth. The subsequent Epsom Derby winner Psidium finished eighteenth. The colt's success, the first for a Scottish-trained horse in a British classic, was greeted enthusiastically in Scotland where Rockavon was described in the press as having "humbled the pride of England, Ireland and France". His owner, who had backed the horse at 100/1, said that while the win was unexpected, he had always hoped that the colt would be a good horse, having picked him out at the sales on his own initiative.

Rockavon reappeared in the Heddon Stakes over nine furlongs at Newcastle on 22 June and won from a single opponent, a four-year-old named Julia's Hamlet. He was then tried over one and a half miles in the King George VI and Queen Elizabeth Stakes at Ascot in July and finished third of the four runners behind Right Royal and St. Paddy. Rockavon returned to Scotland in September and finished unplaced in the Doonside Cup at Ayr. On his final appearance he was part of an international field for the Champion Stakes at Newmarket in October. He was among the leaders until two furlongs from the finish, but then faded to finish unplaced behind the French-trained Bobar.

== Assessment ==
As noted above, Rockavon's two-year-old form was not good enough to merit his inclusion in the official Free Handicap. The independent Timeform organisation awarded him a rating of 120, as a three-year-old, making him their lowest-rated 2000 Guineas winner. In their book A Century of Champions, based on a modified version of the Timeform system, John Randall and Tony Morris rated Rockavon the worst 2000 Guineas winner of the 20th century, commenting that he benefited from "the most inept of competition".

== Stud record ==
Rockavon was retired from racing to become a breeding stallion. He sired a few minor winners but nothing of any consequence and in 1970 he was exported to France where he did no better. His last reported foals were born in 1973.

== Pedigree ==
Pedigree of Rockavon (GB), bay stallion, 1958
Sire Rockefella (GB) 1943	Hyperion (GB); 1930	Gainsborough*	Bayardo*
Sire Rockefella (GB) 1943	Hyperion (GB); 1930	Gainsborough*	Rosedrop*
Sire Rockefella (GB) 1943	Hyperion (GB); 1930	Selene	Chaucer
Sire Rockefella (GB) 1943	Hyperion (GB); 1930	Selene	Serenissima
Sire Rockefella (GB) 1943	Rockfel (GB); 1935	Felstead	Spion Kop
Sire Rockefella (GB) 1943	Rockfel (GB); 1935	Felstead	Felkington
Sire Rockefella (GB) 1943	Rockfel (GB); 1935	Rockliffe	Santorb
Sire Rockefella (GB) 1943	Rockfel (GB); 1935	Rockliffe	Sweet Rocket
Dam Cosmetic (GB) 1940	Sir Cosmo (IRE); 1926	The Boss	Orby*
Dam Cosmetic (GB) 1940	Sir Cosmo (IRE); 1926	The Boss	Southern Cross
Dam Cosmetic (GB) 1940	Sir Cosmo (IRE); 1926	Ayn Hali	Desmond
Dam Cosmetic (GB) 1940	Sir Cosmo (IRE); 1926	Ayn Hali	Lalla Rookh
Dam Cosmetic (GB) 1940	Beautiful Girl (GB); 1933	Son-in-Law	Dark Ronald
Dam Cosmetic (GB) 1940	Beautiful Girl (GB); 1933	Son-in-Law	Mother in Law
Dam Cosmetic (GB) 1940	Beautiful Girl (GB); 1933	Ars Divina	Gainsborough*
Dam Cosmetic (GB) 1940	Beautiful Girl (GB); 1933	Ars Divina	Eos (Family 2-n)*

* Rockavon is inbred 3S x 4D to the stallion Gainsborough, meaning that he appears third generation on the sire side of his pedigree, and fourth generation on the dam side of his pedigree.

* Rockavon is inbred 4D x 5D to the stallion Orby, meaning that he appears fourth generation and fifth generation (via Eos) on the dam side of his pedigree.
