= Rockfel =

British-bred Thoroughbred racehorse (1935–1941)

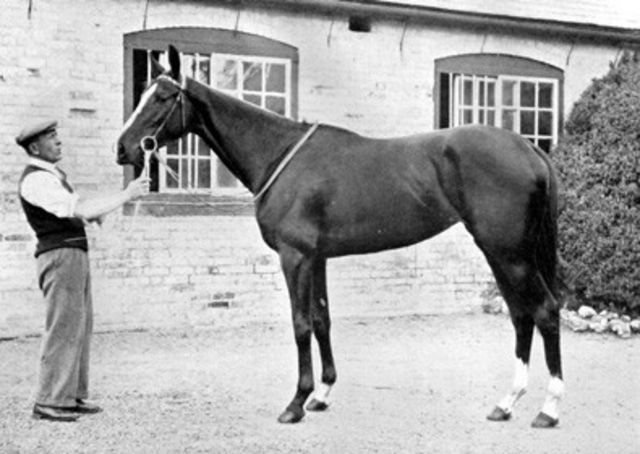
- Sire: Felstead
- Grandsire: Spion Kop
- Dam: Rockliffe
- Damsire: Santorb
- Sex: Mare
- Foaled: 1935
- Country: United Kingdom
- Colour: Brown
- Breeder: Weir Bank Stud
- Owner: Hugo Cunliffe-Owen
- Trainer: Ossie Bell
- Record: 13: 8–0–2

Major wins
- Princess Elizabeth Stakes (1938); 1000 Guineas (1938); Epsom Oaks (1938); Champion Stakes (1938)

Honours
- Top-rated British three-year-old (1938); Rockfel Stakes at Newmarket
- Last updated on 11 October 2025

Rockfel (1935 – November 1941) was a British-bred Thoroughbred racehorse and broodmare who won two Classics in 1938. In a career which lasted from July 1937 until May 1939 she ran thirteen times and won eight races. Rockfel began her career at the lowest level, being beaten in a selling race, but improved to become recognised as one of the best British racemares of the 20th century. In 1938 she was the dominant three-year-old in England, winning the 1000 Guineas over one mile at Newmarket and the Oaks over one and a half miles at Epsom. In the autumn she defeated colts in the Champion Stakes and the Aintree Derby and was retired after winning her only race as a four-year-old. She produced one foal before dying in November 1941.

== Background ==
Rockfel was a brown mare with a white blaze and three white socks, and was described in her prime as having "a very plain head and a light neck". She was sired by The Derby winner Felstead out of the mare Rockliffe who won ten minor races for her owner Lord Londonderry. The mating of Felstead and Rockliffe was arranged by Londonderry, who then sold the pregnant mare for 3,000 guineas to Felstead's owner Sir Hugo Cunliffe-Owen. The resulting filly was therefore officially bred by Cunliffe-Owen's Weir Park Stud.

Rockfel was sent into training with the Australian Oswald Marmaduke Dalby "Ossie" Bell at his Delamere House stable in Lambourn Berkshire. According to the Bloodstock Breeders' Review, Rockfel was an unusually intelligent and independent horse, leading to her being nicknamed "the old lady", by Bell's stable staff.

== Racing career ==
=== 1937: two-year-old season ===
Until 1946 there was no requirement for two-year-old British racehorses to have official names and the filly who became Rockfel remained unnamed throughout 1937. On her racecourse debut she finished unplaced in a selling race at Sandown Park in July. After finishing unplaced again she showed the first signs of ability when running third, beaten a head and a short head in a maiden race at Newmarket Racecourse over six furlongs on 28 September. "The Rockliffe filly" won at the fourth attempt when taking the five furlong Askham Maiden Plate at York Racecourse on 7 October. In the Free Handicap, a rating of the season's best two-year-olds, she was given a weight of 108 pounds, twenty-five pounds below the top-rated Portmarnock and twenty-one pounds behind the leading filly Radiant.

=== 1938: three-year-old season ===
In the spring of 1938 Rockfel showed improved form to finish third in the Free Handicap over seven furlongs and then recorded her most important success up to that time when winning the Princess Elizabeth Stakes at Epsom. At Newmarket Rockfel started at odds of 8/1 for the 1000 Guineas against nineteen other fillies. Ridden by Sam Wragg she led from the start and after being briefly challenged by Laughing Water two furlongs from the finish she drew away to win comfortably by one and a half lengths from Laughing Water, with Solar Flower third.

In the Oaks a month later, Sam Wragg was replaced as her jockey by his brother Harry and Rockfel started 3/1 favourite. She led from the start and won by four lengths from Radiant with Solar Flower third. Her winning time of 2:37.00 was 1.5 seconds faster than that recorded by Bois Roussel when winning the Derby at the same meeting. Rockfel was brought back in distance for the one mile Coronation Stakes at Royal Ascot in which she failed when attempting to concede fourteen pounds to the winner Solar Flower. In the Hyperion Stakes at the next Ascot meeting Rockfel defeated Solar Flower for the third time in four meetings, this time conceding three pounds.

In October, Rockfel was tried against colts and older horses in the ten furlong Champion Stakes at Newmarket. Ridden again by Harry Wragg she won by five lengths from the 2000 Guineas winner Pasch, who had been strongly fancied to beat her. On her final start of the season she again raced against colts in the thirteen furlong Aintree Derby on 9 November. She led from the start and accelerated away from her rivals in the closing stages, winning by three lengths from the Jockey Club Cup winner Foxglove and the St Leger runner-up Challenge. After the race the filly was escorted to the winner's enclosure by a "guard of honour" formed by cheering spectators. Wragg was reported to have described the filly as the best horse he had ever ridden, calling her a "perfect racing machine".

=== 1939: four-year-old season ===
Rockfel was kept in training at four and was aimed Ascot Gold Cup where she was expected to meet Bois Roussel. She began the season by easily winning the March Stakes at Newmarket in spring but then developed training problems and was retired to stud without racing again.

== Assessment and honours ==
At the end of 1938, Rockfel was rated equal with the Derby winner Bois Roussel, when both were assigned a weight of 133 pounds in the three-year-old version of the Free Handicap. Early in 1939 it was reported that she had been favourably compared to Pretty Polly and Sceptre.

In their book, A Century of Champions, based on the Timeform rating system, John Randall and Tony Morris rated Rockfel a "great" winner of the 1000 Guineas and Oaks and the seventh best British-trained filly of the 20th century.

The Rockfel Stakes a Group Two race for two-year-old fillies at Newmarket was named in the mare's honour in 1981.

== Breeding record ==
Rockfel's time at stud was brief: in November 1941 she became ill and died of a "twisted gut". Earlier that year she had produced her only foal, a colt sired by Hyperion. Named Rockefella, he won three races and sired the 2000 Guineas winner Rockavon and the leading Japanese sire China Rock. Rockefella was also the damsire of Sharpen Up, who was the sire of Kris, Sharpo, Diesis and Pebbles.

== Pedigree ==
Pedigree of Rockfel (GB), brown mare, 1935
Sire Felstead (GB)	Spion Kop	Spearmint	Carbine
Sire Felstead (GB)	Spion Kop	Spearmint	Maid of the Mint
Sire Felstead (GB)	Spion Kop	Hammerkop	Gallinule
Sire Felstead (GB)	Spion Kop	Hammerkop	Concussion
Sire Felstead (GB)	Felkington	Lemberg	Cyllene
Sire Felstead (GB)	Felkington	Lemberg	Galicia
Sire Felstead (GB)	Felkington	Comparison	William the Third
Sire Felstead (GB)	Felkington	Comparison	Combine
Dam Rockliffe (GB)	Santorb	Santoi	Queen's Birthday
Dam Rockliffe (GB)	Santorb	Santoi	Merry Wife
Dam Rockliffe (GB)	Santorb	Countess Torby	Morganatic
Dam Rockliffe (GB)	Santorb	Countess Torby	All Square
Dam Rockliffe (GB)	Sweet Rocket	Rock Flint	Rock Sand
Dam Rockliffe (GB)	Sweet Rocket	Rock Flint	Trigger
Dam Rockliffe (GB)	Sweet Rocket	Bustle	Eager
Dam Rockliffe (GB)	Sweet Rocket	Bustle	Sophie Arnould (Family 7-a)
