= Musket (horse) =

British-bred Thoroughbred racehorse

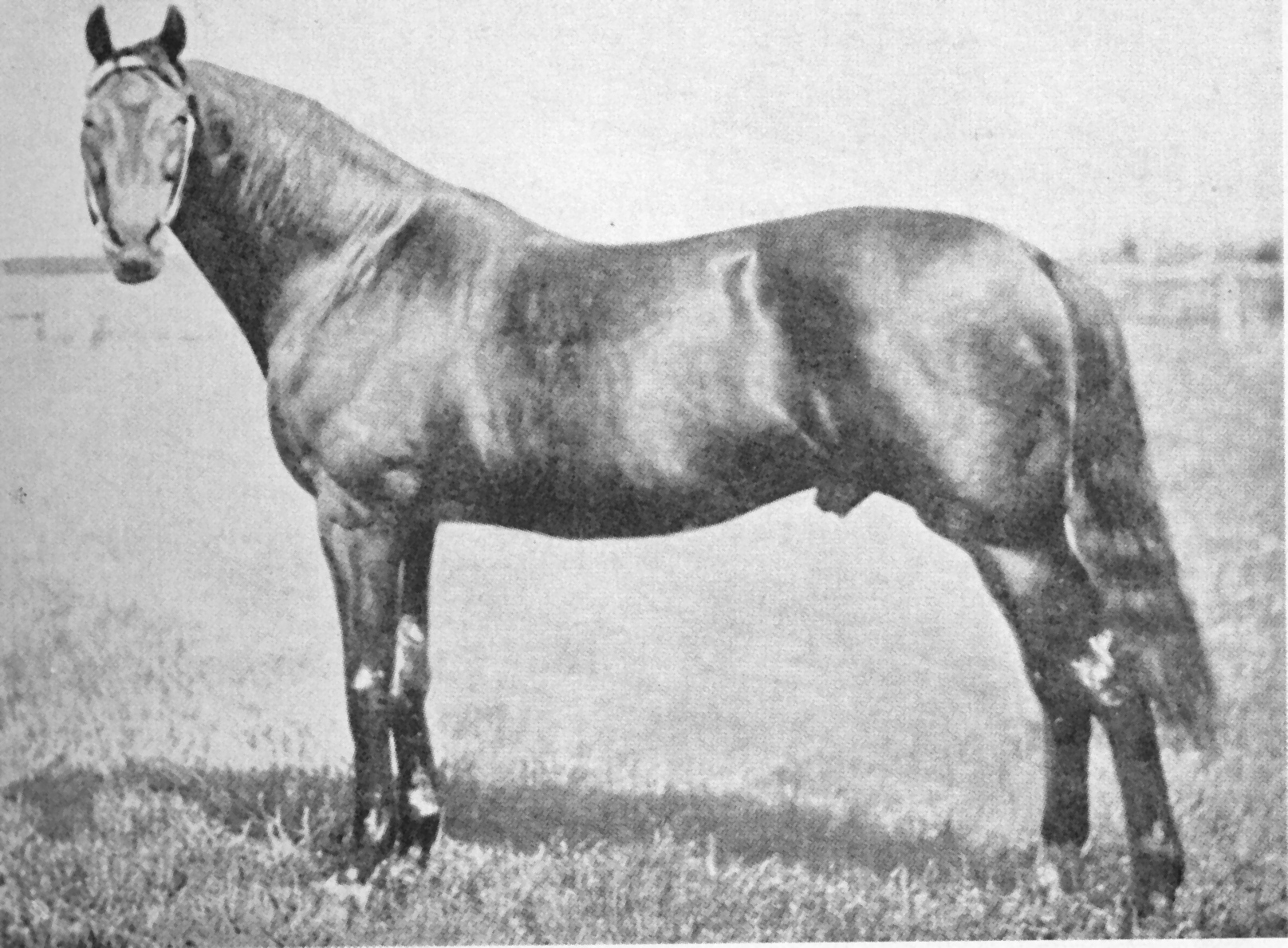
- Sire: Toxophilite
- Grandsire: Longbow
- Dam: West Australian mare (B. 1857)
- Damsire: West Australian
- Sex: Stallion
- Foaled: 1867
- Died: 1885 (aged 17–18)
- Country: Great Britain
- Colour: Bay or brown
- Breeder: Lord Glasgow
- Owner: George Payne
- Record: 14: 9-5-0

Major wins
- Flying Dutchman Handicap; Ascot Stakes (1870); Queen Alexandra Stakes (1872)

Awards
- Leading sire in Australia (1886, 1889, 1891)
- Last updated on 24 March 2010

Musket (1867–1885) was an English-bred Thoroughbred racehorse and a Leading sire in Australia and New Zealand.

== Breeding ==
He was sired by Toxophilite, his dam was a bay mare (1857) who was a half-sister to General Peel’s dam, by West Australian (winner of the 1853 British Triple Crown) from Brown Bess (1844) by Camel. Musket was inbred to Touchstone in the fourth generation (4x4).

== Racing record ==
In England Musket won nine races, including the Ascot Stakes before retiring to stud there where he only had limited patronage. In spite of this, he managed to sire Petronel winner of the 2,000 Guineas and Brown Bess (1876), winner of the Doncaster Cup and Goodwood Stakes.

== Stud record ==
In December 1878 Musket was imported into Victoria by the Auckland Stud Company and then sent to Auckland, New Zealand, the following month. Initially he was used here to cover "half-bred" mares to breed coach horses.

He sired 28 stakes winners, which had 107 stakes wins, including:

- Cuirassier, winner of the Great Northern Derby
- Foul Shot won the Auckland Derby
- Fusilade, won New Zealand Cup
- Fusileer, who won the Wanganui Derby
- Manton, Derby Stakes, New Zealand Cup, Wanganui Derby
- Martini-Henry, Victoria Derby, Melbourne Cup
- Nordenfeldt, Victoria Derby, AJC Australian Derby
- Trenton, ARC Welcome Stakes, CJC Champagne Stakes, VRC Royal Park Stakes (twice), etc., sire of good racehorses including Wakeful and Auraria.

Musket is best remembered for siring the famous Carbine (great-great-grandsire of Nearco), Nordenfeldt, Trenton (a leading sire in Australasia and then exported), Martini-Henry and Hotchkiss, all top sires. Carbine in his day was considered one of the greatest horses in the world, whose feats included winning the 1890 Melbourne Cup with the impost of 10 st 5 lb in the record time of 3:28¼. The bloodlines of Musket, including Carbine and Trenton, are still evident in many horses racing today.

Musket had his portrait painted by the noted equine artist, Martin Stainforth and it was reproduced in Racehorses in Australia.

== Sire line tree ==
- Musket
  - Petronel
    - Ragimunde
    - Son of a Gun
  - Martini-Henry
    - Rudolph
    - Singapore
  - Fusileer
  - Trenton
    - Gerard
    - Delaware
    - Light Artillary
    - Trenchant
    - Dreamland
    - O'Trigger
    - The Merry Boy
    - Cydnus
    - Onslow
    - Resolute
    - Aurum
    - Majestic
    - Reliance
    - Revenue
    - Tremarden
    - Torpoint
    - Knight Errant
      - Roamer
      - Hibler
  - Foul Shot
  - Fusilade
  - Matchlock
  - Nordenfeldt
    - Crackshot
    - Medallion
    - Strathmore
    - Zalinksi
      - Clean Sweep
    - Stepniak
      - Menschikoff
      - Orloff
      - All Red
    - Carnage
    - Havoc
    - Johansen
  - Maxim
    - Maxio
      - Rossfenton
  - Cuirassier
  - Carbine
    - Wallace
      - Emir
      - F J A
      - True Scot
      - Mountain King
      - Trafalgar
      - Wolawa
      - Kingsburgh
      - Patrobas
    - Fucile
    - Amberite
    - Pistol
      - Paratoo
        - White Nose
    - Greatorex
      - Nobleman
      - Relish
      - Dignitary
        - Tenon
    - Foresight
      - Forbra
    - Spearmint
      - Assagai
        - Mint Briar
      - Catmint
      - Cyklon
        - Trivalve
      - Polygonum
      - Chicle
        - Cherry Pie
        - Whichone
      - Spearhead
        - Spearfelt
      - Lord Archer
        - Master Charlie
      - Telephus
      - Johren
        - Edisto
      - Spion Kop
        - Felstead
        - Kopi
        - The Buzzard
        - Hill Song
        - Landscape Hill
        - Battle Song
      - Royal Lancer
        - Good Citizen
      - Spike Island
        - Amur
      - Spelthorne
      - Zionist
        - Pomme d'Api
        - Scolopax
        - Mas d'Antipes
      - Steel Point
        - Freebooter
      - Money Maker
      - Wavetop
        - Knight's Crest
    - Ramrod
    - Wax Bullet
      - Dog Fox
  - Hotchkiss
    - True Blue
      - Blue Spec
  - Manton

== Pedigree ==
Pedigree of Musket (GB), B.h. 1867
Sire Toxophilite Bay 1855	Longbow; Bay 1849	Ithulriel	Touchstone*
Sire Toxophilite Bay 1855	Longbow; Bay 1849	Ithulriel	Verbena
Sire Toxophilite Bay 1855	Longbow; Bay 1849	Miss Bowe	Catton
Sire Toxophilite Bay 1855	Longbow; Bay 1849	Miss Bowe	Orville mare (21) (1812)
Sire Toxophilite Bay 1855	Legerdemain; Bay 1846	Pantaloon	Castrel
Sire Toxophilite Bay 1855	Legerdemain; Bay 1846	Pantaloon	Idalia
Sire Toxophilite Bay 1855	Legerdemain; Bay 1846	Decoy	Filho da Puta
Sire Toxophilite Bay 1855	Legerdemain; Bay 1846	Decoy	Finesse
Dam West Australian mare Bay 1857	West Australian; Bay 1850	Melbourne	Humphrey Clinker
Dam West Australian mare Bay 1857	West Australian; Bay 1850	Melbourne	Cervantes mare (1-a) (1825)
Dam West Australian mare Bay 1857	West Australian; Bay 1850	Mowerina	Touchstone*
Dam West Australian mare Bay 1857	West Australian; Bay 1850	Mowerina	Emma
Dam West Australian mare Bay 1857	Brown Bess; Bay 1844	Camel*	Whalebone*
Dam West Australian mare Bay 1857	Brown Bess; Bay 1844	Camel*	Selim mare (1812)*
Dam West Australian mare Bay 1857	Brown Bess; Bay 1844	Brutandorf mare (1829)	Brutandorf
Dam West Australian mare Bay 1857	Brown Bess; Bay 1844	Brutandorf mare (1829)	Gohanna mare (1803) (family: 3-d)

* Musket is inbred 5S x 5D x 3D to the stallion Camel, meaning that he appears fifth generation (via Touchstone) on the sire side of his pedigree, and fifth generation (via Touchstone) and third generation on the dam side of his pedigree.

* Musket is inbred 4S x 4D to the stallion Touchstone, meaning that he appears fourth generation on the sire side of his pedigree, and fourth generation on the dam side of his pedigree.

== See also ==
- Thoroughbred racing in New Zealand
