= Felstead (horse) =

British-bred Thoroughbred racehorse

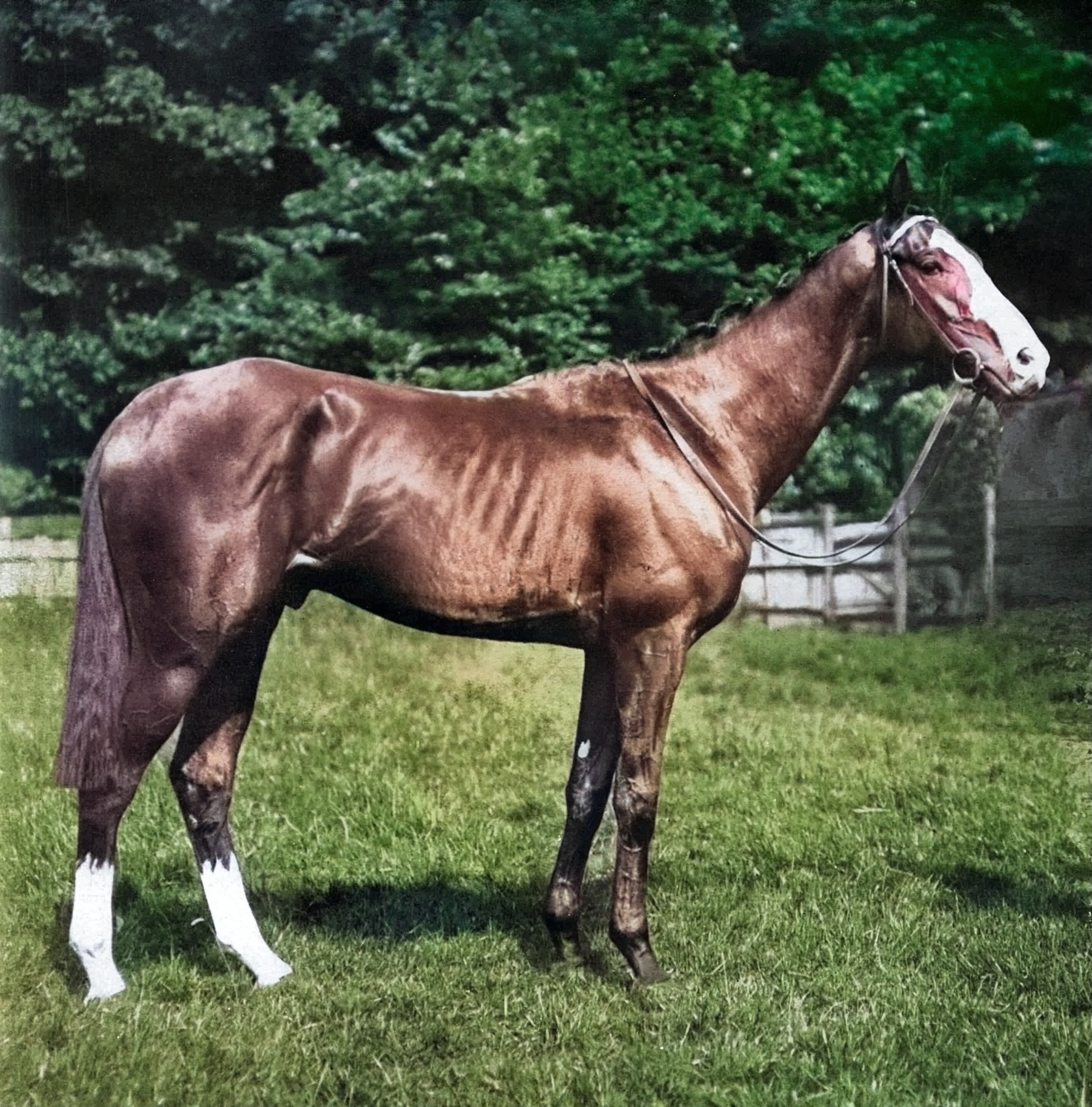
- Felstead in 1928.
- Sire: Spion Kop
- Grandsire: Spearmint
- Dam: Comedienne
- Damsire: Lemberg
- Sex: Stallion
- Foaled: 1925
- Country: United Kingdom of Great Britain and Ireland
- Colour: Bay
- Breeder: Hugo Cunliffe-Owen
- Owner: Hugo Cunliffe-Owen
- Trainer: Oswald Bell
- Record: 9: 3-1-1
- Earnings: £

Major wins
- Epsom Derby (1928)

Felstead (1925–1946) was a British Thoroughbred racehorse and sire. After failing to show any worthwhile form as a two-year-old he made exceptional improvement as a three-year-old to win the 1928 Epsom Derby at odds of 33/1 in record time. Soon after his win at Epsom, Felstead was injured in training and never ran again. He later had some success as a stallion.

== Background ==
Felstead, a bay horse standing 16.2 hands high with a white blaze and white socks on his hind legs was bred by his owner Sir Hugo Cunliffe-Owen at his Sunningdale Stud in Berkshire. Cunliffe-Owen paid 2,100 gns at the Newmarket sales in July 1924 for the mare Felkington who was then in foal (pregnant) to the Derby winner Spion Kop. The resulting foal was named Felstead and grew into a powerful-looking individual with "a rump on him which a heavyweight hunter could not better."

Felkington had been a successful racehorse and went on to be a successful broodmare: apart from Felstead she produced six other winners including the Gold Cup winner Finis. Spion Kop was a good sire of stayers, with his progeny including Kopi (Irish Derby), Bongrace (Doncaster Cup) and The Bastard (Yorkshire Cup, Leading sire in Australia). Felstead was inbred 3x4 to the New Zealand bred Carbine (see below), to whom he was said to bear a striking resemblance.

Felstead was sent into training with the Australian Oswald "Ossie" Bell at his Delamere House Stables in Lambourn. Bell's involvement and Carbine's southern hemisphere origins led the Sydney Sun to describe Felstead's Epsom victory as "Australia's Derby". The first LNER Class A3 steam locomotive, a development of the earlier Class A1, was named after the horse.

== Racing career ==
=== 1927: two-year-old season ===
Like his sire Spion Kop, Felstead made little impact in his first season. He failed to win in four races, with his best effort coming when he finished second in a "very small" handicap race at Chepstow.

=== 1928: three-year-old season ===
According to his owner, Felstead was off his food in the early part of the year, and only made progress after being fed on "Bemax", a commercial form of wheatgerm. On his three-year-old debut, Felstead provided evidence that he had made significant improvement over the winter by easily winning a maiden race at Newbury. He was then placed in a seven furlong handicap on his first visit to Epsom before being sent to Newmarket for the 2000 Guineas. Given his pedigree, which suggested that Felstead would be a stayer, he produced a promising effort to finish sixth of the seventeen runners behind Flamingo. On his final race before the Derby, Felstead was moved up to middle distances for the first time and won the Davis Stakes at Hurst Park.

On unusually hard ground at Epsom, Felstead started a 33/1 outsider in front of a huge and enthusiastic crowd which included the King and Queen. Fairway was a strong favourite, but lost his chance by becoming highly agitated and upset before the start. Felstead was ridden in the race by Ossie Bell's stable jockey Harry Wragg, a rider whose expertise in riding horses from off the pace led to his being nicknamed "The Head Waiter". The early pace in the Derby was extremely strong as Flamingo and Sunny Trace disputed the lead, going "hell for leather", with Wragg holding up Felstead several lengths behind the leading pair. Sunny Trace weakened early in the straight and Flamingo took a clear lead as Wragg moved Felstead up into a challenging position. Inside the final furlong Felstead took the lead on the inside and pulled ahead to win "quite comfortably" by one and a half lengths. The winning time of 2:34.4 equalled the race record set by Call Boy in the previous year. Shortly after the race a writer in Punch published an analysis of thirty-three Newspaper "prophecies" for the race, showing that there had been 19 tips for Fairway, 8 for Flamingo, 4 for Sunny Trace and 2 for other horses. None of the "prophets" had even mentioned Felstead as a place prospect.

Felstead was rested after the Derby and it was expected that he would reappear in the St Leger. His reputation and potential were emphasised when Cunliffe-Owen reportedly turned down a £100,000 American offer for the colt in July. The offer was the equal-highest ever made for a thoroughbred at the time. Felstead developed a splint soon after Epsom however, and by mid-August he was lame, ruling him out of the St Leger and ending his season. Attempts to bring him back as a four-year-old failed after further training problems and he was retired to stud.

== Assessment ==
Felstead's injury and the premature ending of his racing career made him a difficult horse to assess authoritatively. In their book A Century of Champions, John Randall and Tony Morris rated Felstead a "poor" Derby winner, although they placed him slightly ahead of his sire.

== Stud career ==
Felstead had little success with his male offspring, but sired two excellent fillies. The better of the two was Rockfel who won the 1000 Guineas, Oaks and Champion Stakes in 1938, while Steady Aim won the Oaks in 1946. It is mainly through Steady Aim, the female line ancestor of Danzig that Felstead continues to appear in the pedigrees of modern thoroughbreds. Felstead died on April 9, 1946, and was buried at the Kingwood Stud at Lambourn.

== Pedigree ==
Pedigree of Felstead (GB), bay stallion, 1925
| Sire Spion Kop (GB) 1917 | Spearmint; 1903 | Carbine* | Musket* |
| Sire Spion Kop (GB) 1917 | Spearmint; 1903 | Carbine* | Mersey* |
| Sire Spion Kop (GB) 1917 | Spearmint; 1903 | Maid of the Mint | Minting |
| Sire Spion Kop (GB) 1917 | Spearmint; 1903 | Maid of the Mint | Warble |
| Sire Spion Kop (GB) 1917 | Hammerkop; 1900 | Gallinule | Isonomy* |
| Sire Spion Kop (GB) 1917 | Hammerkop; 1900 | Gallinule | Moorhen |
| Sire Spion Kop (GB) 1917 | Hammerkop; 1900 | Concussion | Reverberation |
| Sire Spion Kop (GB) 1917 | Hammerkop; 1900 | Concussion | Astwith |
| Dam Felkington (GB) 1918 | Lemberg; 1907 | Cyllene | Bona Vista |
| Dam Felkington (GB) 1918 | Lemberg; 1907 | Cyllene | Arcadia* |
| Dam Felkington (GB) 1918 | Lemberg; 1907 | Galicia | Galopin* |
| Dam Felkington (GB) 1918 | Lemberg; 1907 | Galicia | Isoletta* |
| Dam Felkington (GB) 1918 | Comparison; 1910 | William The Third | St Simon* |
| Dam Felkington (GB) 1918 | Comparison; 1910 | William The Third | Gravity |
| Dam Felkington (GB) 1918 | Comparison; 1910 | Combine | Carbine* |
| Dam Felkington (GB) 1918 | Comparison; 1910 | Combine | Molly Morgan(Family: 3-j) |

* Felstead is inbred 3S x 4D to the stallion Carbine, meaning that he appears third generation on the sire side of his pedigree, and fourth generation on the dam side of his pedigree.

* Felstead is inbred 4S x 5D x 5D to the stallion Isonomy, meaning that he appears fourth generation once on the sire side of his pedigree, and fifth generation twice (via Arcadia and Isoletta) on the dam side of his pedigree.

* Felstead is inbred 4D x 5D to the stallion Galopin, meaning that he appears fourth generation and fifth generation (via St Simon) on the dam side of his pedigree.
