= Caligula (horse) =

Irish-bred Thoroughbred racehorse

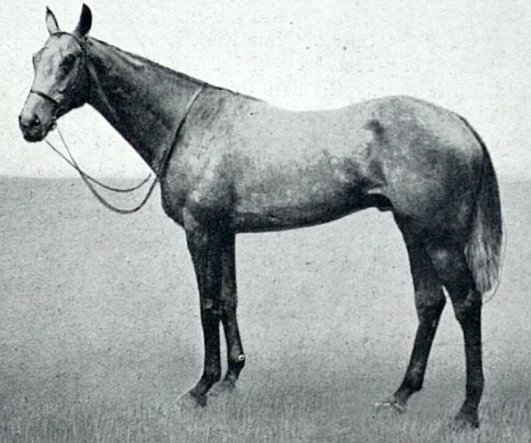
- Caligula in 1920.
- Sire: The Tetrarch
- Grandsire: Roi Herode
- Dam: Snoot
- Damsire: Parigord
- Sex: Stallion
- Foaled: 1917
- Country: Ireland
- Colour: Grey
- Breeder: James J Maher
- Owner: Seymour Edward Frederick Egerton, 6th Earl of Wilton; Mathradas Goculdas
- Trainer: Harvey Leader
- Record: 9: 3-1-1
- Earnings: £7,941

Major wins
- Ascot Derby (1920); St Leger (1920)

Caligula (1917 – after 1936) was an Irish-bred British-trained Thoroughbred racehorse and sire. He was unraced as a two-year-old in 1919 before emerging as a top-class stayer in the following year. In his first eight races as a three-year-old he won a minor race at Newmarket and the Ascot Derby but looked outpaced when tried over shorter distances. He recorded his biggest win on his final appearance when he recorded an upset victory over a strong field in the St Leger. After being briefly exported to India he stood as a breeding stallion at various European locations but had little success as a sire of winners.

== Background ==
Caligula was a "striking" grey horse bred in County Kildare Ireland by James J. Maher. As a yearling he was put up for auction and bought for 3,100 guineas by Seymour Edward Frederick Egerton, 6th Earl of Wilton. Lord Wilton sent the colt into training with Harvey Leader at Newmarket, Suffolk.

He was sired by The Tetrarch an unbeaten horse who was regarded as one of the fastest two-year-old ever seen in Britain and Ireland, but whose career was ended by injury before he could race at three. The Tetrarch showed very little interest in his stud duties: his attitude towards sex was described as being "monastic in the extreme". Although he sired few foals his progeny included several major winners. Caligula's dam Snoot was an influential broodmare whose other descendants include Nashua, La Sorellina (Prix de l'Arc de Triomphe), King of Kings, American Flag, Blue Swords, Noverre, and Dance Partner.

== Racing career ==
=== 1920: three-year-old season ===
Caligula, who was unraced as a two-year-old, made his racecourse debut in the Severals Stakes at Newmarket Racecourse in April and finished second to Cicerole. At the next Newmarket meeting he finished down the field behind Tetratema in the 2000 Guineas and then recorded his first success in a minor race under a light weight of 100 pounds. Later that month he ran disappointingly when 1/3 favourite for a race at York Racecourse in May. In June, it became apparent that Lord Wilton, who was well known for his heavy betting, was experiencing financial difficulties: he withdrew Caligula from the Derby and was forced to cancel a "large private luncheon party". At Royal Ascot in June Caligula, ridden by Joe Childs started at odds of 10/1 for the Ascot Derby and won "easily" from Paladin and Novello, while the leading fancies Abbot's Trace and Hugo Cunliffe-Owen's Orpheus were unplaced. On the following day the colt was dropped in distance and was beaten into third behind Allenby and Edward Hulton's Silvern in the St James's Palace Stakes over one mile. At Goodwood Racecourse in July he ran unplaced behind Braishfield in the Sussex Stakes. On his last run before the St Leger Caligula ran in the £1,000 Richemount Plate at Hurst Park in August and finished a close fourth behind Bracket, Bideford and Most Beautiful.

In the late summer of 1920 Lord Wilton financial problems worsened and his creditors refused to let his horses race. With Caligula scheduled to run in the St Leger but unable to do so under Wilton's ownership, Harvey Leader embarked on a search for a new owner for the colt and a week before the race arranged his sale to the Indian industrialist and businessman Mathradas Goculdas. The sale was private but the price was reported to be approximately 8,000 guineas.

On 8 September, in front of an exceptionally large crowd at Doncaster Racecourse, Caligula stated at odds of 100/6 (approximately 16.7/1) for the 145th running of the St Leger over 14 1/2 furlongs. Shortly before the race the colt had performed very impressively in a training gallop at Newmarket leading the London Sportsman's correspondent to describe him as a likely winner but this was a minority view. The Derby winner Spion Kop started favourite at 3/1 in a field of fourteen despite having had injury problems in the build up to the race, while the other fancied runners included Allenby, Silvern, Abbot's Trace and Orpheus. The race was run in a fog, and for most of the race the runners were not visible from the stands. When the leaders emerged from the murk in the straight Black Gauntlet was in front but Caligula, ridden by Arthur Smith, took the lead approaching the final furlong and held off a challenge from Silvern to win by half a length, with three lengths back to Lady James Douglas's Manton (a 33/1 outsider) in third place. Caligula's victory was surprising from a pedigree viewpoint as The Tetrarch's stock had previously been regarded as deficient in stamina.

Caligula earned £7,941 in 1920, making him the second most financially successful horse of the season behind the 1000 Guineas winner Cinna.

It was reported that Goculdas had imported Caligula in late September to India with the intention of racing him at least once (in the Viceroy's Cup) before standing him at stud. Later reports suggested that Goculdas had brought the colt to India simply to look at him before returning Caligula to England to begin his career as a breeding stallion.

== Assessment and honours ==
In their book, A Century of Champions, based on the Timeform rating system, John Randall and Tony Morris rated Caligula an "inferior" winner of the St Leger.

== Stud record ==
Caligula stood as a breeding stallion in Britain and Germany, with his last foals being born in 1938. He had fertility problems throughout his stud career and sired few foals, but did get some good winners including The Consul (Yorkshire Cup).

== Pedigree ==
Pedigree of Caligula (IRE), grey stallion, 1917
Sire The Tetrarch (IRE) 1911	Roi Herode (FR); 1904	Le Samaritain	Le Sancy
Sire The Tetrarch (IRE) 1911	Roi Herode (FR); 1904	Le Samaritain	Clementina (GB)
Sire The Tetrarch (IRE) 1911	Roi Herode (FR); 1904	Roxelane	War Dance
Sire The Tetrarch (IRE) 1911	Roi Herode (FR); 1904	Roxelane	Rose of York (GB)
Sire The Tetrarch (IRE) 1911	Vahren (GB); 1897	Bona Vista	Bend Or
Sire The Tetrarch (IRE) 1911	Vahren (GB); 1897	Bona Vista	Vista
Sire The Tetrarch (IRE) 1911	Vahren (GB); 1897	Castania	Hagioscope
Sire The Tetrarch (IRE) 1911	Vahren (GB); 1897	Castania	Rose Garden
Dam Snoot (IRE) 1906	Perigord (GB); 1890	St Simon	Galopin
Dam Snoot (IRE) 1906	Perigord (GB); 1890	St Simon	St Angela
Dam Snoot (IRE) 1906	Perigord (GB); 1890	Effie Deans	Strathconan
Dam Snoot (IRE) 1906	Perigord (GB); 1890	Effie Deans	Lufra
Dam Snoot (IRE) 1906	N.R.A. (GB); 1902	Deuce of Clubs	Robert the Devil
Dam Snoot (IRE) 1906	N.R.A. (GB); 1902	Deuce of Clubs	Ursula
Dam Snoot (IRE) 1906	N.R.A. (GB); 1902	Miss Gunning	Petronel
Dam Snoot (IRE) 1906	N.R.A. (GB); 1902	Miss Gunning	Rose Maylie (Family 7)
