= Hypericum (horse) =

British-bred Thoroughbred racehorse

- Sire: Hyperion
- Grandsire: Gainsborough
- Dam: Feola
- Damsire: Friar Marcus
- Sex: Mare
- Foaled: 1943
- Country: United Kingdom
- Colour: Bay
- Breeder: King George VI
- Owner: King George VI
- Trainer: Cecil Boyd-Rochfort
- Record: 8: 3-2-0

Major wins
- Dewhurst Stakes (1945); 1000 Guineas (1946)

Hypericum (1943 – after 1964) was a British Thoroughbred racehorse and broodmare. Bred and owned by King George VI she was one of the best two-year-old fillies in England in 1945 when she won two of her four races including the Dewhurst Stakes as well as finishing second in the Middle Park Stakes. In the following year she became increasingly temperamental but after finishing second on her seasonal debut she won the 1000 Guineas despite throwing her jockey and bolting before the start. In her two subsequent races she finished fourth in the Epsom Oaks and unplaced in the Coronation Stakes. As a broodmare she had an enduring influence on the breed through her granddaughter Highclere.

== Background ==
Hypericum was a bay mare bred and owned by King George VI. She was trained throughout her racing career by Cecil Boyd-Rochfort at the Freemason Lodge Stable in Newmarket, Suffolk. The filly was ridden in most of her races by Doug Smith.

She was sired by Hyperion, who won the Epsom Derby and the St Leger Stakes in 1933 and went on to become an internationally significant sire: Hypericum's successes enabled Hyperion to claim the second and third of his six sires' championships in 1945 and 1946. Her dam Feola finished second in the 1000 Guineas and third in the Epsom Oaks before becoming a very successful broodmare. Her other female-line descendants included Round Table, Pebbles, Aureole, Lassalle, Jet Ski Lady and Johannesburg.

== Racing career ==
=== 1945: two-year-old season ===
In 1945 Hypericum won one of her first two races. In October the filly was stepped up in class for the Middle Park Stakes over six furlongs and finished second to the Aga Khan's colt Khaled. Later that month she started 4/7 favourite and won the seven-furlong Dewhurst Stakes. In the Free Handicap, a ranking of the season's best juveniles, Hypericum was assigned a weight of 122 pounds, eight pounds below the top filly Neolight.

=== 1946: three-year-old season ===
On her debut as a thee-year-old Hypericum finished second to Neolight in the Katheryn Howard Stakes at Hurst Park. On 3 May she started at odds of 100/6 for the 133rd running of the 1000 Guineas over the Rowley Mile course. Neolight was made the 4/6 favourite while the best-fancied horses were the Aga Khan's Cama and Lord Rosebery's Iona. As the thirteen runners approached the starting tapes Hypericum swerved, unseating Doug Smith and cantered three-quarters of a mile before she was caught and returned to the start. When the race began, fifteen minutes later, the filly swerved again but soon settled and won by one and a half lengths from Neolight, with Iona three-quarters of a length back in third. Hypericum's victory, which was witnessed by Princess Elizabeth, was described as one of the most popular ever seen at Newmarket. After her victory it was explained that Hypericum was a "problem" horse who had thrown off every rider who had mounted her, including her trainer.

In the Epsom Oaks on 7 June Hypericum started 9/4 second favourite behind Iona but after misbehaving at the start again she finished fourth of the ten runners behind Steady Aim, Iona and Nelia. The filly was dropped back in distance for the Coronation Stakes over one mile at Royal Ascot but ran poorly behind Neolight and was retired from racing soon afterwards.

== Assessment and honours ==
In their book, A Century of Champions, based on the Timeform rating system, John Randall and Tony Morris rated Hypericum an "average" winner of the 1000 Guineas.

== Breeding record ==
After her retirement from racing to become a broodmare for the Royal Stud. On the death of the King in 1952 she passed into the ownership of Queen Elizabeth II. She produced at least seven foals between 1949 and 1964:

- Prescription, a chestnut filly, foaled in 1949, sired by Epigram.
- Belladonna, bay filly, 1952, by Donatello. Winner. Dam of Ben Marshall (won St Leger Italiano).
- Medici, colt, 1953, by Donatello.
- Restoration, bay colt, 1955, by Persian Gulf. Won King Edward VII Stakes.
- Highlight, bay filly, 1958, by Borealis. Winner. Dam of Highclere and female-line ancestor of Deep Impact and Height of Fashion.
- Eucumbene, bay filly, 1962, by Sica Boy. Winner; second in the Yorkshire Oaks. Dam of Eucalyptus (Ballymoss Stakes).
- Narcotic, bay filly, 1964, by Narrator.

== Pedigree ==
Pedigree of Hypericum (GB), bay mare, 1943
Sire Hyperion (GB) 1930	Gainsborough (GB); 1915	Bayardo	Bay Ronald
Sire Hyperion (GB) 1930	Gainsborough (GB); 1915	Bayardo	Galicia
Sire Hyperion (GB) 1930	Gainsborough (GB); 1915	Rosedrop	St. Frusquin
Sire Hyperion (GB) 1930	Gainsborough (GB); 1915	Rosedrop	Rosaline
Sire Hyperion (GB) 1930	Selene (GB) bay 1919	Chaucer	St. Simon
Sire Hyperion (GB) 1930	Selene (GB) bay 1919	Chaucer	Canterbury Pilgrim
Sire Hyperion (GB) 1930	Selene (GB) bay 1919	Serenissima	Minoru
Sire Hyperion (GB) 1930	Selene (GB) bay 1919	Serenissima	Gondolette
Dam Feola (GB) 1933	Friar Marcus (IRE); 1912	Cicero (GB)	Cyllene
Dam Feola (GB) 1933	Friar Marcus (IRE); 1912	Cicero (GB)	Gas
Dam Feola (GB) 1933	Friar Marcus (IRE); 1912	Prim Nun (GB)	Persimmon
Dam Feola (GB) 1933	Friar Marcus (IRE); 1912	Prim Nun (GB)	Nunsuch
Dam Feola (GB) 1933	Aloe (GB); 1926	Son-in-Law	Dark Ronald (IRE)
Dam Feola (GB) 1933	Aloe (GB); 1926	Son-in-Law	Mother In Law
Dam Feola (GB) 1933	Aloe (GB); 1926	Alope	Gallinule
Dam Feola (GB) 1933	Aloe (GB); 1926	Alope	Altoviscar (Family:2-f)
