= Royal Lancer =

Irish-bred Thoroughbred racehorse

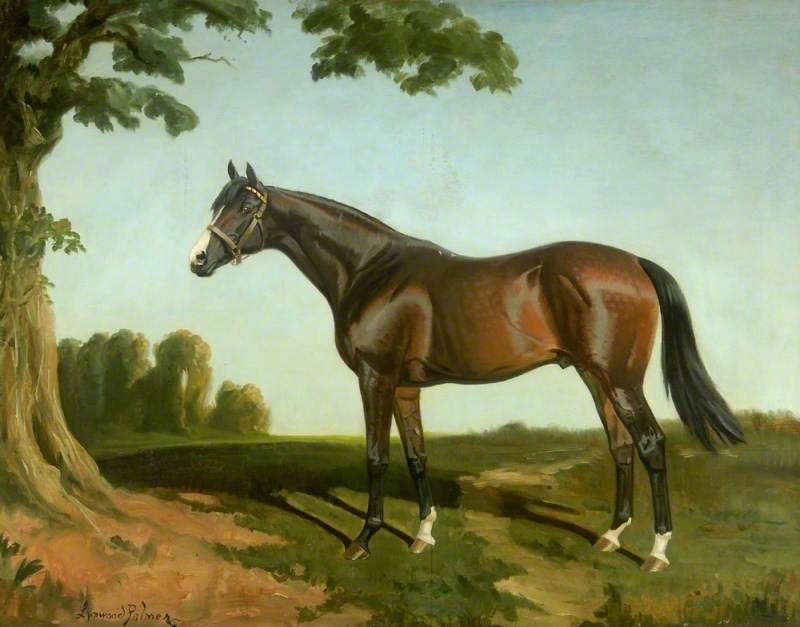
- Royal Lancer, by James Lynwood Palmer, Doncaster Museum And Art Gallery
- Sire: Spearmint
- Grandsire: Carbine
- Dam: Royal Favour
- Damsire: White Eagle
- Sex: Stallion
- Foaled: 1919
- Country: Ireland
- Colour: Bay
- Breeder: National Stud
- Owner: Hugh Lowther, 5th Earl of Lonsdale
- Trainer: Alfred Sadler
- Record: 13: 6-2-0
- Earnings: £14,522 (1922)

Major wins
- St Leger (1922); Irish St. Leger (1922)

Awards
- Biggest prize-money winner in Britain (1922)

Royal Lancer (1919 – after 1937) was an Irish Thoroughbred racehorse and sire. He showed little promise as a juvenile when he won one minor race from six attempts. In the following year he made steady improvement, winning three handicap races before recording a 33/1 upset victory in the St Leger. He followed up by taking the Irish St. Leger but never won again and was retired from racing in 1923. He made no impact as a breeding stallion.

== Background ==
Royal Lancer was a bay horse with a white blaze and three white socks bred in County Kildare Ireland by the National Stud and leased during his racing career to Hugh Lowther, 5th Earl of Lonsdale. The leasing arrangement meant that one third of the horses earnings went to the Stud. He was a very late foal, being born towards the end of May and was undersized and unprepossessing as a yearling. The colt was sent into training with Alfred "Flash Alf" Sadler at the Freemason Lodge table in Newmarket, Suffolk.

His sire Spearmint won the Derby and the Grand Prix de Paris in 1906 before becoming a successful breeding stallion whose other foals included Spion Kop, Zionist (Irish Derby), Johren and Plucky Liege. Royal Lancer was the first foal of his dam Royal Favour a great-granddaughter of the British broodmare St Cypria (foaled 1888) whose other descendants have included Bold Ruler, The Panther, Touching Wood and Speciosa.

The name Royal Lancer had previously been given to a top-class racehorse who won the Sussex Stakes in 1902.

== Racing career ==
=== 1921: two-year-old season ===
Royal Lancer showed moderate ability in his first season on the track. After failing to win or place in his first five starts he eventually recorded a victory in the £275 Leyester Nursery at Warwick Racecourse.

=== 1922: three-year-old season ===
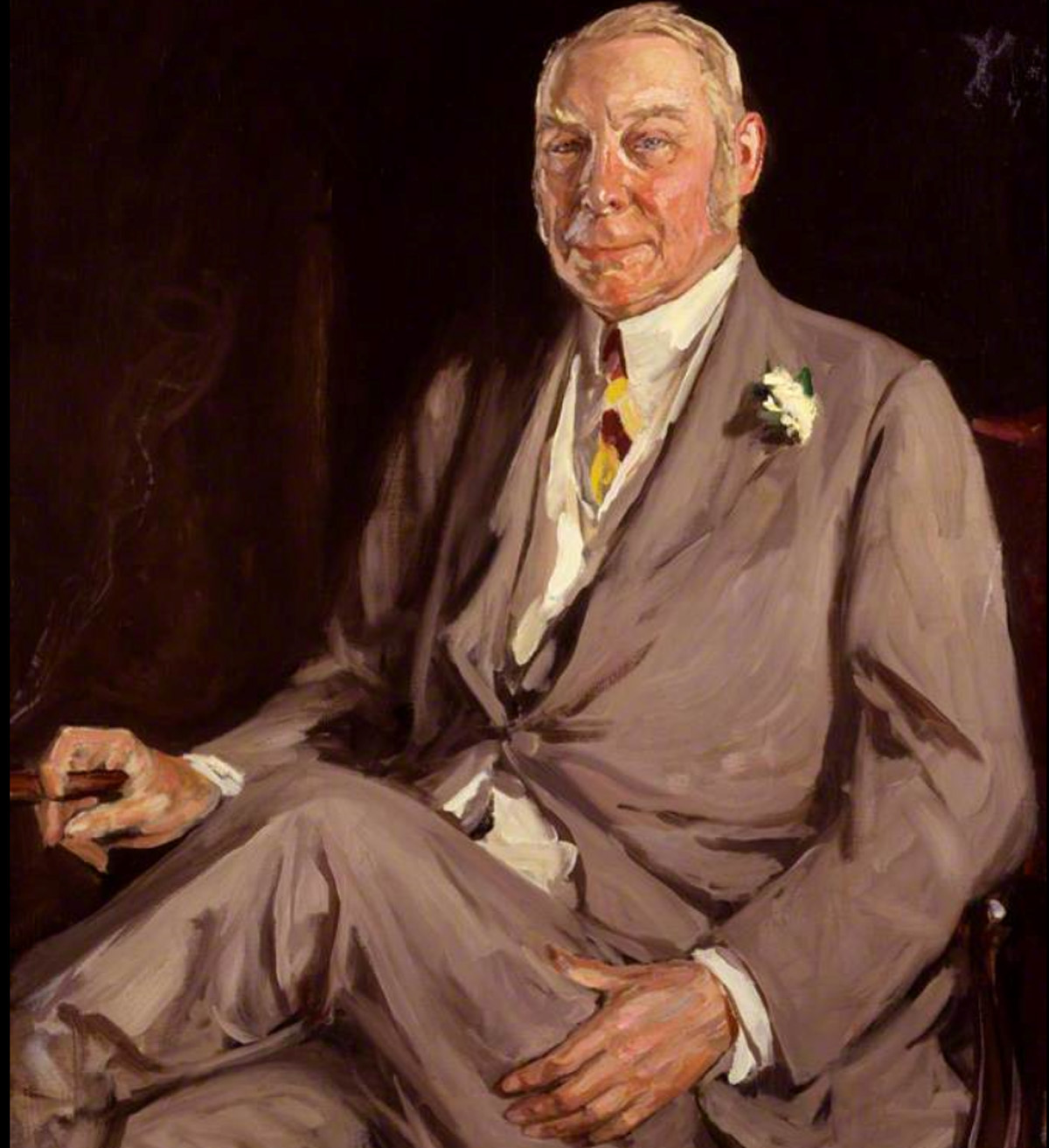
Lord Lonsdale, Royal Lancer's owner

On his first appearance as a three-year-old Royal Lancer contested the Newark Three-Year-Old Handicap over one mile at Nottingham Racecourse and won from twelve rivals under a weight of 118 pounds. He followed up by carrying 109 pounds to victory in the New Stands Handicap over ten furlongs at Pontefract and then finished second to Fred Power in the Dee Stakes at Chester. Royal Lancer first attracted serious attention on 20 May when he won the Royal Windsor Three-Year-Old Handicap over 1 1/2 miles at Windsor Racecourse, a performance which saw him being described as a "high-class" horse.

On 13 September Royal Lancer was stepped up sharply in class for the 147th St Leger over 14 1/2 furlongs at Doncaster Racecourse in which he was ridden by the seventeen-year-old apprentice jockey Robert "Bobby" Jones. He started a 33/1 outsider in a twenty-two runner field headed by the French challenger Ramus, winner of the Prix du Jockey Club. The complexion of the race was changed at the start when Ramus missed the break and was left a long way behind the other runners. Royal Lancer was always in contention, went to the front in the straight and won the race "easily" by two lengths from Lord Derby's Silurian, with a further two lengths back to Abe Bailey's Ceylonese in third. Lord Londale was pleased but surprised by the result, stating that the winner had been regarded as much inferior to his unplaced stablemate Diligence. Bobby Jones said "Royal Lancer could have gone to the front much sooner than he did had I cared to let him, and once I got there it was smooth going for me and I was confident of winning my first classic."

Eight days after his victory at Doncaster, Royal Lancer won the Irish St. Leger at the Curragh. On 26 October at Newmarket the colt started the 4/5 for the Jockey Club Cup but was beaten into second place by Bucks Hussar.

Royal Lancer earned £14,522 in 1922, making him the most financially successful racehorse in the season ahead of Golden Myth, Captain Cuttle and Pogrom.

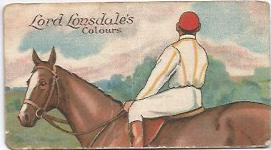
Lord Lonsdale's racing colours by E & W Anstie Ltd cigarette card (1922)

=== 1923: four-year-old season ===
Royal Lancer remained in training as a four-year-old in 1923 but sustained a serious injury in spring and did not race again. He was retired from racing at the end of the year.

== Assessment and honours ==
In their book, A Century of Champions, based on the Timeform rating system, John Randall and Tony Morris rated Royal Lancer as a "poor" winner of the St Leger.

== Stud record ==
At the end of his racing career, Royal Lancer was retired to become a breeding stallion at Lord Lonsdale's stud at Barleythorpe in Rutland. He had very little success as a breeding stallion and was exported to South Africa where his last foals were born in 1938.

== Pedigree ==
Pedigree of Royal Lancer (GB), bay stallion, 1919
Sire Spearmint (GB) 1903	Carbine (NZ); 1885	Musket (GB)	Toxophilite
Sire Spearmint (GB) 1903	Carbine (NZ); 1885	Musket (GB)	West Australian mare
Sire Spearmint (GB) 1903	Carbine (NZ); 1885	Mersey	Knowsley
Sire Spearmint (GB) 1903	Carbine (NZ); 1885	Mersey	Clemence
Sire Spearmint (GB) 1903	Maid of the Mint (GB); 1897	Minting	Lord Lyon
Sire Spearmint (GB) 1903	Maid of the Mint (GB); 1897	Minting	Mint Sauce
Sire Spearmint (GB) 1903	Maid of the Mint (GB); 1897	Warble	Skylark
Sire Spearmint (GB) 1903	Maid of the Mint (GB); 1897	Warble	Coturnix
Dam Royal Favour (IRE) 1914	White Eagle (GB); 1905	Gallinule	Isonomy*
Dam Royal Favour (IRE) 1914	White Eagle (GB); 1905	Gallinule	Moorhen
Dam Royal Favour (IRE) 1914	White Eagle (GB); 1905	Merry Gal	Galopin*
Dam Royal Favour (IRE) 1914	White Eagle (GB); 1905	Merry Gal	Mary Seaton*
Dam Royal Favour (IRE) 1914	Order of Merit (GB); 1904	Collar	St Simon*
Dam Royal Favour (IRE) 1914	Order of Merit (GB); 1904	Collar	Ornament
Dam Royal Favour (IRE) 1914	Order of Merit (GB); 1904	Lady Rayleigh	Hampton
Dam Royal Favour (IRE) 1914	Order of Merit (GB); 1904	Lady Rayleigh	St Cypria (Family 8-d)

* Royal Lancer is inbred 4D x 5D to the stallion Isonomy, meaning that he appears fourth generation and fifth generation (via Mary Seaton) on the dam side of his pedigree.

* Royal Lancer is inbred 4D x 5D to the stallion Galopin, meaning that he appears fourth generation and fifth generation (via St Simon) on the dam side of his pedigree.
