= Martin Stainforth =

English painter

Martin Frank Stainforth (14 August 1866 – 22 April 1957) was a British-born artist best known for his portraits of Thoroughbred racehorses he painted in England and while living in Australia and the United States.

== Biography ==
Born at Martley, Worcestershire, Stainforth began his artistic career as a traditional artist doing religious portraits and wood engravings in the vein of the Italian Old Masters. The quality of his work brought invitations to exhibit at the Royal Academy as well as at venues in Berlin, Germany; Brussels, Belgium; and Paris, France. At the beginning of the 20th century, he began working as a magazine illustrator but a visit to North Queensland, Australia in 1908 led to his settling there and developing his skills as a painter of animals and especially equine portraiture. Among his works, there is a portrait of the 1912 AJC Queen Elizabeth Stakes winner, Trafalgar. The publication "Racehorses in Australia with paintings by Martin Stainforth" is an important standard reference work in Australian Thoroughbred literature. First published in 1922 with many tipped in plates, a facsimile reprint was issued in 1983 but without any tipping in. Good copies of the original with dust jackets are hard to find. The book contained reproductions of paintings of many notable Thoroughbreds including Carbine, Comedy King, Kennaquhair, Poitrel and Eurythmic.

Martin Stainforth lived in Sydney for close to twenty years but around 1928 he spent time in New Zealand before returning to his native England in 1930 where he was commissioned to do the portraits of a number of racehorses including Hyperion for Edward Stanley, 17th Earl of Derby and other prominent owners such as King George V. Near the end of 1934, Stainforth moved to New York City where he would remain for nearly fifteen years, spending considerable time at the hotel Breslin. He was hired to paint many famous American horses, including future U.S. Hall of Fame horse, Johnstown and 1937 U.S. Triple Crown winner, War Admiral as well as early American champion Sir Archy and Man o' War.

Martin Stainforth returned to England around 1949 where he died in 1957. Some of his works can be seen at the Australian Jockey Club at Randwick Racecourse near Sydney, New South Wales as well as at the National Museum of Racing and Hall of Fame in Saratoga Springs, New York. A watercolour of Carbine by the artist (who painted the great horse on a number of occasions) sold for A$25,000 at a Sotheby's auction in Sydney in late 2007.
