= Danzig (horse) =

American-bred racehorse and sire

- Danzig's grave at Claiborne Farm
- Sire: Northern Dancer
- Grandsire: Nearctic (CAN)
- Dam: Pas de Nom
- Damsire: Admiral's Voyage
- Sex: Stallion
- Foaled: February 12, 1977
- Died: January 4, 2006 (aged 28)
- Country: United States
- Colour: Bay
- Breeder: Derry Meeting Farm & William S. Farish III
- Owner: Henryk de Kwiatkowski
- Trainer: Woody Stephens
- Record: 3: 3–0–0
- Earnings: $32,400

Awards
- Leading sire in North America (1991, 1992, 1993)

Danzig (February 12, 1977 – January 4, 2006) was an American Thoroughbred racehorse who is best known as a leading sire. He was purchased for $310,000 (equivalent to $1.5 million in 2025) by Henryk de Kwiatkowski at the 1978 Saratoga Yearling Sale. The son of Hall of Famer Northern Dancer and the most commercially successful sire of the second half of the 20th century, he won all three of his races before knee problems ended his racing career.

== Stud record ==
Danzig was retired to stand at stud at Claiborne Farm near Paris, Kentucky, where he became one of the world's most important sires. He led the U.S. sires list from 1991 to 1993 and topped the sire list in Spain and the United Arab Emirates.

Danzig sired 188 graded stakes race winners and 10 champions. His foals have earned more than $100 million in purse money and include Breeders' Cup winners Chief's Crown, Lure, Dance Smartly, and War Chant as well as European champions Dayjur and Anabaa. Danzig also sired 1992 Preakness Stakes winner Pine Bluff and is the sire of Canadian Horse Racing Hall of Fame inductee Langfuhr, who in turn sired Canadian Triple Crown winner and Horse of the Year Wando.

A leading sire of sires, Danzig sired Danehill, the first Thoroughbred in history to sire 300 stakes winners, while another son, Green Desert, has champions Oasis Dream, Ouija Board, Sea The Stars, and Kingman amongst his descendants. Danzig was also the damsire of Fusaichi Pegasus and Dancethruthedawn and was the grandsire of 2008 Kentucky Derby and Preakness winner Big Brown. His son Hard Spun finished second in the 2007 Kentucky Derby behind Street Sense.

Danzig and his son Danehill were dominant bay sires along with another 17 of Danzig's sons: they would not produce chestnut progeny and only a grey if the foal's dam was grey.

Danzig was pensioned at 27 in 2004 and on January 3, 2006, was humanely euthanized due to the infirmities of old age. He was buried at Claiborne Farm's equine cemetery.

At maturity, he reached 15.3 hands (63 inches, 160 cm) high.

== Pedigree ==
Pedigree of Danzig (USA), bay stallion, 1977
Sire Northern Dancer (CAN) B.1961	Nearctic (CAN); Br.1954	Nearco	Pharos
Sire Northern Dancer (CAN) B.1961	Nearctic (CAN); Br.1954	Nearco	Nogara
Sire Northern Dancer (CAN) B.1961	Nearctic (CAN); Br.1954	Lady Angela	Hyperion
Sire Northern Dancer (CAN) B.1961	Nearctic (CAN); Br.1954	Lady Angela	Sister Sarah
Sire Northern Dancer (CAN) B.1961	Natalma; B. 1957	Native Dancer	Polynesian
Sire Northern Dancer (CAN) B.1961	Natalma; B. 1957	Native Dancer	Geisha
Sire Northern Dancer (CAN) B.1961	Natalma; B. 1957	Almahmoud	Mahmoud
Sire Northern Dancer (CAN) B.1961	Natalma; B. 1957	Almahmoud	Arbirator
Dam Pas de Nom Br. 1968	Admiral's Voyage; Br. 1959	Crafty Admiral	Fighting Fox
Dam Pas de Nom Br. 1968	Admiral's Voyage; Br. 1959	Crafty Admiral	Admiral's Lady
Dam Pas de Nom Br. 1968	Admiral's Voyage; Br. 1959	Olympia Lou	Olympia
Dam Pas de Nom Br. 1968	Admiral's Voyage; Br. 1959	Olympia Lou	Louisiana Lou
Dam Pas de Nom Br. 1968	Petitioner (GB); Bay 1952	Petition	Fair Trial
Dam Pas de Nom Br. 1968	Petitioner (GB); Bay 1952	Petition	Art Paper
Dam Pas de Nom Br. 1968	Petitioner (GB); Bay 1952	Steady Aim	Felstead
Dam Pas de Nom Br. 1968	Petitioner (GB); Bay 1952	Steady Aim	Quick Arrow (Family: 7-a)

== See also ==
- Claiborne Farm
- List of leading Thoroughbred racehorses
- Northern Dancer
- Northern Dancer sire line
- Thoroughbred breeding theories
