= Carbine (horse) =

New Zealand-bred Thoroughbred racehorse

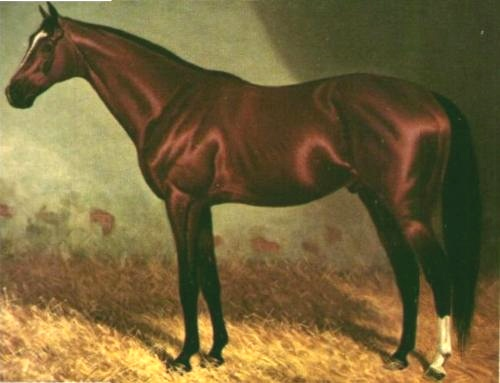
- Carbine c. 1897
- Sire: Musket (GB)
- Grandsire: Toxophilite
- Dam: Mersey (GB)
- Damsire: Knowsley
- Sex: Stallion
- Foaled: 1885
- Died: 1914 (aged 28–29)
- Country: New Zealand
- Colour: Bay
- Breeder: N.Z. Stud Co.
- Owner: Donald Smith Wallace
- Trainer: Walter S. Hickenbotham
- Record: 43: 33-6-3
- Earnings: £29,626 (a record for over 20 years)

Major wins
- Cumberland Stakes (1888); Sydney Cup (1889, 1890); All Aged Stakes (1889, 1890); AJC Plate (1889, 1890, 1891); Melbourne Stakes (1890); Craven Plate (1890); Melbourne Cup (1890); AJC Spring Stakes (1890)

Honours
- Australian Racing Hall of Fame; New Zealand Racing Hall of Fame (2006)
- Last updated on 8 May 2009

Carbine (1885–1914) was a champion New Zealand-bred Thoroughbred racehorse who won 30 principal races in New Zealand and Australia. He was very popular with racing fans, and sporting commentators of the day praised him for his gameness, versatility, stamina and weight-carrying ability, as well as for his speed. He was one of five inaugural inductees into both the New Zealand Racing Hall of Fame and the Australian Racing Hall of Fame.

== Background ==
Carbine was foaled at Sylvia Park Stud near Auckland, New Zealand on 18 September 1885. He was a bay stallion who was sired by the Ascot Stakes winner and successful sire Musket. His dam was the imported British mare Mersey, whose sire was Knowsley. Carbine was inbred to Brown Bess in the third and fourth generations. He was a half-brother to the stakes winning stallion Carnage who won the Victoria Derby, Champagne Stakes, Spring Stakes, and Essendon Stakes. When fully mature, Carbine stood about 16 hands 1 inch in height, possessed good conformation and temperament, although he had some foibles.

== Racing career ==
During his career on the race track, Carbine started 43 times for 33 wins, six seconds and three thirds, failing to place only once due to a badly split hoof.

Carbine, nicknamed "Old Jack", was undefeated in five starts in top-class races as a two-year-old in New Zealand. He then was taken to Australia, where he won nine of 13 starts as a three-year-old. One highlight that year was his win in the AJC Sydney Cup of 2 miles (3,220 metres) carrying 12 lb (5.5 kg) over weight-for-age. Despite suffering interference at the half-mile post and being buffeted back to last place, Carbine won by a head in a record time of 3 min 31 s. (Race times were slower in Carbine's era than now due, among other factors, to the rough state of tracks and the upright posture in the saddle assumed by 19th-century jockeys.) At the end of his three-year-old racing season, Carbine was sold by his owner-trainer Dan O'Brien for 3,000 guineas and prepared by his new owners for racing in Sydney and Melbourne.

As a four- and five-year-old, Carbine won 17 of what would prove to be his last 18 races. On four occasions Carbine won twice on the same day. His victory in the 1890 Melbourne Cup was noteworthy. He set a weight-carrying record of 10 st 5 lb (66 kg) in the Cup, defeating a field of 39 starters and setting a record time for the race. He carried 53 lb (24 kg) more than the second-place horse, Highborn.

Carbine was owned for most of his Australian career by Donald Wallace, a wealthy horse-breeder, investor, and Member of the Victorian Parliament. Walter Hickenbotham, a prominent Melbourne-based horseman, trained him. Wallace and Hickenbotham planned to enter Carbine in the 1891 Melbourne Cup and other major events of that year's turf calendar but a chronic heel injury thwarted their intentions, and Carbine was retired to Wallace's stud.

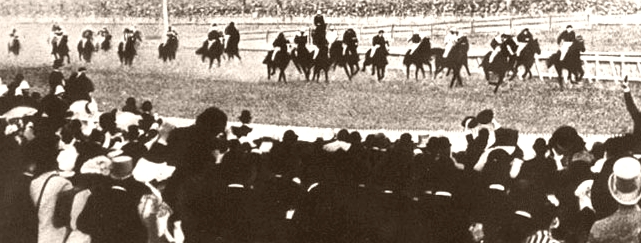
Carbine winning the Melbourne Cup

== Stud record ==
Carbine proved his stud potential the following year, 1892, by siring a colt named Wallace, who went on to become an exceptionally good racehorse and sire. Wallace was considered the best of Carbine's Australian-bred progeny. He won the VATC Caulfield Guineas, Victoria Derby, Sydney Cup and other good races. Despite limited stud opportunities Wallace was the Leading sire in Australia in the 1915/16 season. Wallace also finished second three times and third three times on the leading sires' table. During Carbine's short Australian stud career he sired the winners of 203½ races worth £48,624, including the multiple stakes winners, Amberite (won Victoria Derby and Caulfield Cup etc.) and La Carabine (Sydney Cup and VRC Australian Cup etc.).

In 1895, the Duke of Portland purchased Carbine for 13,000 guineas. He was shipped from Melbourne to the Duke's English stud at Welbeck Abbey where he was the second stud sire to the outstanding St. Simon, who covered the best mares. A son of Carbine, Greatorex, was a minor race winner in England before he was exported to South Africa, where he became a leading sire on ten occasions and influenced bloodlines there. Carbine sired Spearmint, the 1906 Epsom Derby and 1906 Grand Prix de Paris winner. Spearmint in turn sired Spion Kop, who also won the Epsom Derby. Spion Kop's offspring included another Derby winner, Felstead. Spion Kop's son, The Buzzard, later stood at stud in Australia. History came full circle when two of The Buzzard's offspring, Old Rowley and Rainbird, won the Melbourne Cup, in 1940 and 1945, respectively. Spearmint was the sire of American three-year-old champion, Johren, foaled in 1915 in England and exported to America as a yearling. Johren was the winner of the 1918 Belmont Stakes and was awarded the American Eclipse Award for Horse of the Year.

Over half of the 65 Melbourne Cup winners from 1914 to 1978 were descendants of Carbine, including Comic Court, Phar Lap, Rising Fast, Rain Lover and Think Big. Statistics and contemporary assessments indicate that he was a dominant antipodean racehorse of the 19th century, and he still ranks with such 20th-century Thoroughbreds as his descendants Danzig, Nearco, Northern Dancer, Mr. Prospector, Nasrullah, Nijinsky II (winner of the UK Triple Crown), Royal Charger and Royal Palace (who have established their own sire-lines) in terms of renown among turf historians.

The descendants of Carbine include eight of the nine horses to earn $10,000,000 or more in stakes wins. These horses are Deep Impact, Makybe Diva, Narita Brian, Sunline, Symboli Kris S, T M Opera O, Viva Pataca and Vodka. Modern day competitors Mine That Bird, Rachel Alexandra and Australian champion Winx trace to Carbine through both their sire and dam.

== Death and subsequent fame ==
Carbine died at Welbeck on 10 June 1914. He had suffered a stroke and was put down with a drug to end his suffering, according to the horse's 'biographer', Grania Polliness. The Duke of Portland gave his skeleton to the Melbourne Museum. Today it is displayed at the Australian Racing Museum and Hall of Fame in Melbourne. Carbine's combined record of documented success as both a racehorse and an international sire is possibly unequalled by any other Australasian Thoroughbred.

Carbine had his portrait painted by the noted equine artist, Martin Stainforth and it was reproduced in Racehorses in Australia.

Carbine's mounted head and tail are in the collection of the Auckland War Memorial Museum.

Carbine's name is immortalised in the name of the road which runs through what was once the Sylvia Park Stud, Carbine Road.

The Perkins Brewery (Toowoomba) named a beer after Carbine, "Carbine Stout" in 1915. When the brewery closed in 1958 Carbine Stout was brewed at Castlemaine Perkins' famous Milton site until 2005, and to this day XXXX receive requests from Stout fans who continue trying to convince Castlemaine to brew it again.

The historic mining town Mount Carbine in Queensland, Australia, is named after him. The name was chosen after his 1890 Melbourne Cup win.

== Sire line tree ==
- Carbine
  - Wallace
    - Emir
    - F J A
    - True Scot
    - Mountain King
    - Trafalgar
    - Wolawa
    - Kingsburgh
    - Patrobas
  - Fucile
  - Amberite
  - Greatorex
    - Nobleman
    - Relish
    - Dignitary
      - Tenon
  - Foresight
    - Forbra
  - Spearmint
    - Assagai
      - Mint Briar
    - Catmint
    - Cyklon
      - Trivalve
    - Polygonum
    - Chicle
      - Cherry Pie
      - Whichone
        - Today
        - Ptolemy
        - Whichcee
        - Bourbon King
        - Triplane
    - Spearhead
    - Lord Archer
      - Master Charlie
    - Telephus
    - Johren
      - Edisto
    - Spion Kop
      - Felstead
      - Kopi
      - The Buzzard
        - Old Rowley
      - Hill Song
      - Landscape Hill
        - Cromwell
        - Monaveen
      - Battle Song
    - Royal Lancer
      - Good Citizen
    - Spike Island
    - Spelthorne
    - Zionist
      - Pomme d'Api
      - Scolopax
      - Mas d'Antipes
    - Steel Point
      - Freebooter
    - Money Maker
    - Wavetop
      - Knight's Crest
  - Wax Bullet
    - Dog Fox

== Pedigree ==
Pedigree of Carbine (NZ) (2-h), bay stallion, 1885
| Sire Musket (GB) Bay 1867 | Toxophilite; Bay 1855 | Longbow | Ithuriel* |
| Sire Musket (GB) Bay 1867 | Toxophilite; Bay 1855 | Longbow | Miss Bowe |
| Sire Musket (GB) Bay 1867 | Toxophilite; Bay 1855 | Legerdemain | Pantaloon |
| Sire Musket (GB) Bay 1867 | Toxophilite; Bay 1855 | Legerdemain | Decoy |
| Sire Musket (GB) Bay 1867 | West Australian mare Bay 1857 | West Australian | Melbourne |
| Sire Musket (GB) Bay 1867 | West Australian mare Bay 1857 | West Australian | Mowerina* |
| Sire Musket (GB) Bay 1867 | West Australian mare Bay 1857 | Brown Bess* | Camel* |
| Sire Musket (GB) Bay 1867 | West Australian mare Bay 1857 | Brown Bess* | Brutandorf mare (1829)* |
| Dam Mersey (GB) Ch. 1874 | Knowsley; Bay 1859 | Stockwell | The Baron |
| Dam Mersey (GB) Ch. 1874 | Knowsley; Bay 1859 | Stockwell | Pocahontas |
| Dam Mersey (GB) Ch. 1874 | Knowsley; Bay 1859 | Orlando mare (1853) | Orlando* |
| Dam Mersey (GB) Ch. 1874 | Knowsley; Bay 1859 | Orlando mare (1853) | Brown Bess* |
| Dam Mersey (GB) Ch. 1874 | Clemence; Ch. 1865 | Newminster | Touchstone* |
| Dam Mersey (GB) Ch. 1874 | Clemence; Ch. 1865 | Newminster | Beeswing |
| Dam Mersey (GB) Ch. 1874 | Clemence; Ch. 1865 | Eulogy | Euclid |
| Dam Mersey (GB) Ch. 1874 | Clemence; Ch. 1865 | Eulogy | Martha Lynn (family 2-h) |

* Carbine is inbred 3S x 4D to the mare Brown Bess, meaning that she appears third generation on the sire side of his pedigree, and fourth generation on the dam side of his pedigree.

* Carbine is inbred 5S x 5S x 5D x 4D to the stallion Touchstone, meaning that he appears fifth generation twice (via Ithuriel and Mowerina) on the sire side of his pedigree, and fifth generation once (via Orlando) and fourth generation once on the dam side of his pedigree.

* Carbine is inbred 4S x 5D x 5D to the stallion Camel, meaning that he appears fourth generation on the sire side of his pedigree, and fifth generation twice (via Brown Bess and Touchstone) on the dam side of his pedigree.

== See also ==
- List of leading Thoroughbred racehorses
- List of racehorses
- Repeat winners of horse races
- Thoroughbred racing in New Zealand
