= Spearmint (horse) =

British-bred Thoroughbred racehorse

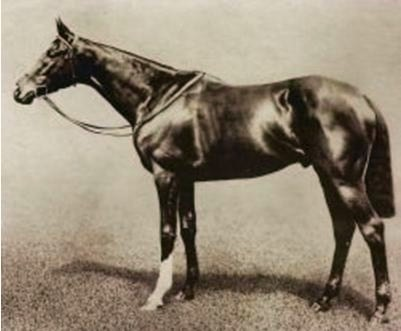
- Sire: Carbine
- Grandsire: Musket
- Dam: Maid of the Mint
- Damsire: Minting
- Sex: Stallion
- Foaled: April 6, 1903
- Died: 1924 (aged 20–21)
- Country: United Kingdom of Great Britain and Ireland
- Colour: Bay
- Breeder: Sir Tatton Sykes
- Owner: Major Eustace Loder
- Trainer: Peter-Purcell Gilpin
- Record: 5: 3-1-0
- Earnings: Not found

Major wins
- Epsom Derby (1906); Grand Prix de Paris (1906)
- Last updated on 17 May 2009

Spearmint (1903–1924) was a British Thoroughbred racehorse and a sire. In a brief racing career which lasted from 1905 until June 1906, he ran five times and won three races. After showing moderate form in 1905, he won The Derby on his seasonal debut at age three and then became the first British horse for twenty years to win France's most important race, the Grand Prix de Paris. He became a successful breeding stallion, siring major winners in Europe and the United States. His daughters produced the winners of eight classic races. Spearmint was placed on the winning sires and brood-mare sires lists on several occasions.

== Background ==
Spearmint was a bay horse with a white blaze and a white sock on his left foreleg who stood 16 hands high. He was bred by Sir Tatton Sykes at the famous Sledmere Stud in Yorkshire. He was by the outstanding racehorse and sire Carbine, a New Zealand Racing Hall of Fame and Australian Racing Hall of Fame inductee to whom he was said to bear a striking resemblance. His dam was the unraced mare Maid of the Mint, by Minting. The mating of Spearmint's parents had actually been arranged by the Maid of the Mint's owner, Sir James Duke, but an expensive lawsuit then forced him to sell the now pregnant mare to Sir Tatton Sykes. Spearmint was doubly inbred to Stockwell in the 4th and 5th generations (4m x 4f x 5f).

Spearmint was sent to the Doncaster sales as a yearling and was purchased by Major Eustace Loder, who had been impressed by the colt when viewing him at Sledmere. The price of 300 guineas reflected the low opinion held by British breeders of Spearmint's sire. Spearmint was sent into training with Peter Purcell-Gilpin at Newmarket where, according to press reports, he was known as "Tom".

== Racing record ==
=== 1905: two-year-old season ===
Spearmint showed modest form in three starts as a two-year-old in 1905. He made his debut in the £835 Great Foal Plate at Lingfield on 15 July, where he started at odds of 9/4 in a field of ten runners and won by a head in a time of 59.2 seconds, despite meeting interference in running. He was then moved up in class for the Breeders' Foal Plate at Derby Racecourse in September and finished third to Black Arrow. On his final start of the year, he ran in the Richmond Nursery, a handicap race for two-year-olds at the Newmarket Houghton meeting in late October. Carrying top weight, he finished fourth. He was regarded as probably the third best juvenile in his stable after the colt Admirable Crichton (a half-brother to Pretty Polly) and the filly Flair. There was some speculation that Spearmint had only been entered in the Derby to act as a pacemaker for one of his more fancied stable companions.

=== 1906: three-year-old season ===
Spearmint made good progress over the winter, and Gilpin planned to prepare the colt to challenge for the Grand Prix de Paris at Longchamp in June, a race which had not been won by a British horse since the victory of Spearmint's maternal grandsire Minting in 1886. By spring, however, Admirable Crichton failed to make the expected progress between two and three, while Flair sustained a serious injury after winning the 1000 Guineas, leaving Spearmint as the stable's only viable Derby contender. He did not race in public before the Derby but beat Pretty Polly and the Cesarewitch winner Hammerkop in a private trial race. When the results of this "private" trial became public, Spearmint began to attract serious support in the betting markets, and his odds fell from 20/1 on 15 May to 11/2 a week later.

At Epsom on 30 May, Spearmint started the 6/1 second favourite for the Derby behind Lally (on 4/1) and was ridden by the American jockey Danny Maher. He faced twenty-one opponents in what was considered an unusually strong field. The race run in fine weather attracted a crowd estimated at 500,000, including King Edward VII. Despite sweating freely in the hot conditions, Spearmint made a strong impression before the race as he demonstrated his "long-sweeping stride" on the way to the start. The early pace was exceptionally strong as the lead passed back and forth between Troutbeck and Picton, with Spearmint settled close behind. Two furlongs from the finish, Spearmint produced a strong run to take the lead and pulled ahead "in determined fashion" to win by one and a half lengths from Picton, with Troutbeck two lengths back in third. The winning time of 2:36.8 broke the race record set a year earlier by Cicero by 2.8 seconds. It was the third Derby win in four years for Maher, who had won on Cicero and on Rock Sand in 1903.

Eleven days later, Spearmint was sent to Longchamp for the Grand Prix de Paris, run over a distance of 3000 metres. Ridden by the Irish jockey Bernard Dillon, he started 9/10 favourite in a field of thirteen which included the Prix du Jockey Club winner Maintenon. After a sprint for the lead to the first turn, Spearmint was settled in front by Dillon and held a clear advantage into the straight. The outsider Brisecoeur emerged as his only serious challenger, but Spearmint ran on strongly to win by half a length with Storm finishing third. Dillon revealed that he had taken the colt to the lead from the start to forestall any attempts by the French jockeys to impede him. He described Spearmint as "the gamest horse I think I ever was on" and claimed that "the farther we had to go the farther he would have won". Spearmint received a warmer reception from the French crowd than was customary for a British winner, and was even kissed by several "fashionable French ladies". Major Loder was personally congratulated by French president Armand Fallières, who also paid a visit to the racecourse stables to view the winner. During his return from Longchamp, Spearmint had a "remarkable escape" when he emerged from a train accident near Amiens with only minor bruising to his head. Spearmint developed leg problems after his win in Paris, reportedly throwing a splint, and was withdrawn from his remaining engagements in 1906.

Spearmint was kept in training in 1907, but his problems continued and by summer it was becoming clear that his legs would not stand up to further racing. He did not run again, and at the end of the year he was retired to stud.

== Stud record ==
Spearmint stood as a stallion at Major Loder's Old Connell Stud in Ireland. He sired the winners of 295 races for £166,855 in prizemoney, including classic winners in Great Britain, Ireland and the United States. His daughters produced the winners of eight classic races. Spearmint was placed on the winning sires and brood-mare sires lists on several occasions.

Among his offspring, he notably sired:

- Catnip (b.m. 1910) - An Irish mare who went to stud in Italy where she became the second dam of the great Nearco
- Chicle (b. 1913) - won Champagne Stakes, Brooklyn Derby, Leading sire in North America (1929), Leading broodmare sire in North America (1942)
- Cyklon, won nine stakes races, sire of 12 stakeswinners, including Trivalve (won Melbourne Cup).
- Fausta won nine races, including the Italian Derby and Italian Oaks. Dam of three Italian Derby winners, Michelangelo, Melozzo da Forli, and Meissonier.
- Johren (b. 1915) - very successful racing in the United States; wins included the 1918 Belmont Stakes
- Lord Archer b. 1914 - sire of Master Charlie, Championship Racehorse in US
- Money Maker was exported to Yugoslavia and became a leading sire there.
- Plucky Liege (b. 1912) - one of the most important broodmares of the 20th century. Dam of Admiral Drake, Bois Roussel, Bull Dog and Sir Gallahad III
- Royal Lancer (b. 1919) - won the English Classic, the St. Leger Stakes, and the Irish St. Leger
- Seaweed, dam of Hotweed (Prix du Jockey Club, the Grand Prix de Paris, Prix du Cadran, Prix Hocquart, Prix Lupin and Prix Gontaut-Biron, sire of Pearlweed) and Brulette (won Goodwood Cup, Prix du Cadran and Prix La Rochette etc.)
- Sentiment (b. 1912) - dam of Night Raid, sire of Phar Lap and Nightmarch
- Spelthorne, won Irish St Leger Stakes and sire in Australia.
- Spion Kop (b. 1917), won 1920 Epsom Derby, sire of Felstead etc.
- Spike Island (b. 1919) - won Irish 2000 Guineas, Irish Derby
- Zionist (1922) - Irish Derby.

Spearmint died on 24 June 1924.

== Sire line tree ==
- Spearmint
  - Assagai
    - Mint Briar
  - Catmint
  - Cyklon
    - Trivalve
  - Polygonum
  - Chicle
    - Cherry Pie
    - Whichone
      - Today
      - Ptolemy
        - Simple Samson
      - Whichcee
      - Bourbon King
      - Triplane
  - Spearhead
    - Spearfelt
      - Darkfelt
  - Lord Archer
    - Master Charlie
  - Telephus
  - Johren
    - Edisto
  - Spion Kop
    - Felstead
    - Kopi
    - The Buzzard
      - Old Rowley
    - Hill Song
    - Landscape Hill
      - Cromwell
      - Monaveen
    - Battle Song
  - Royal Lancer
    - Good Citizen
  - Spike Island
    - Amur
  - Spelthorne
  - Zionist
    - Pomme d'Api
    - Scolopax
    - Mas d'Antipes
  - Steel Point
    - Freebooter
  - Money Maker
  - Wavetop
    - Knight's Crest

== Pedigree ==
Pedigree of Spearmint (GB), bay stallion, 1903
Sire Carbine (NZ) B. 1885	Musket (GB); Bay 1867	Toxophilite	Longbow
Sire Carbine (NZ) B. 1885	Musket (GB); Bay 1867	Toxophilite	Legerdemain
Sire Carbine (NZ) B. 1885	Musket (GB); Bay 1867	West Australian mare (B. 1857)	West Australian
Sire Carbine (NZ) B. 1885	Musket (GB); Bay 1867	West Australian mare (B. 1857)	Brown Bess*
Sire Carbine (NZ) B. 1885	Mersey (GB); Ch. 1874	Knowsley	Stockwell*
Sire Carbine (NZ) B. 1885	Mersey (GB); Ch. 1874	Knowsley	Orlando mare*
Sire Carbine (NZ) B. 1885	Mersey (GB); Ch. 1874	Clemence	Newminster
Sire Carbine (NZ) B. 1885	Mersey (GB); Ch. 1874	Clemence	Eulogy
Dam Maid of the Mint 1897	Minting; Bay 1883	Lord Lyon	Stockwell*
Dam Maid of the Mint 1897	Minting; Bay 1883	Lord Lyon	Paradigm
Dam Maid of the Mint 1897	Minting; Bay 1883	Mint Sauce	Young Melbourne*
Dam Maid of the Mint 1897	Minting; Bay 1883	Mint Sauce	Sycee
Dam Maid of the Mint 1897	Warble; Bay 1884	Skylark	King Tom
Dam Maid of the Mint 1897	Warble; Bay 1884	Skylark	Wheat-Ear*
Dam Maid of the Mint 1897	Warble; Bay 1884	Coturnix	Thunderbolt*
Dam Maid of the Mint 1897	Warble; Bay 1884	Coturnix	Fravolina (Family: 1-c)

* Spearment is inbred 4S x 4D x 5D to the stallion Stockwell, meaning that he appears fourth generation on the sire side of his pedigree, and fourth generation and fifth generation (via Thunderbolt) on the dam side of his pedigree.

* Spearmint is inbred 4S x 5S to the mare Brown Bess, meaning that she appears fourth generation and fifth generation (via Orlando mare) on the sire side of his pedigree.

* Spearmint is inbred 4D x 5D to the stallion Young Melbourne, meaning that he appears fourth generation and fifth generation (via Wheat-Ear) on the dam side of his pedigree.
