= Splints =

Condition in horses

Splints is an ailment of the horse or pony, characterized by a hard, bony swelling, usually on the inside of a front leg, lying between the splint and cannon bone or on the splint bone itself. It may be "hot," meaning that it occurred recently and is still painful; or "cold," meaning that the splint has completely recovered and there is no longer any pain associated with it. Bucked shins are sometimes called 'shin splints,' which involve small stress fractures of the dorsal cannon bone, often seen in race training, and discussed elsewhere.

== Anatomy ==
The splint bones, (metacarpal or metatarsal II and IV), which are remnants of two of the five toes of prehistoric horses, run down either side of the cannon bone. They narrow as they go from the carpal or tarsal joint down, and form a "button" at the bottom or their length, a few inches above the fetlock. Splint bones are attached to the cannon by interosseous ligaments, providing some mobility in the young horse. As the horse ages, the interosseous ligaments are typically replaced by bone. In some older horses, the cannon and splint bones may become completely fused.

== Causes ==
Direct trauma, such as from an interference injury or a kick from another horse, is a common causes of splints. The periosteum is damaged by the trauma, and the horse's body lays down new bone in the injured area. Splints caused by trauma are more commonly seen lower down the leg than ones caused by strain. The splints may occur in a front leg or hind, in one leg or both. Severe enough trauma can fracture the splint bone. If minimally displaced, and in the lower portion, some heal well. Others may need surgical removal of a portion of the damaged splint bone.

Concussion is another cause of splints. Concussive forces run from the carpus or tarsus into the splint bones. Working a horse on hard surfaces increases the concussion received by the interosseous ligament, which causes tearing. Splints caused by concussion are usually found on both front legs, most commonly on the inside of the leg a few inches below the knee.

Overworking young or unfit horses at speed or in tight circles may cause splints. The uneven loading of the limb in tight circles places excessive force on the medial splint, which can cause it to move excessively relative to the cannon bone, causing tears in the interosseous ligament and periosteal reaction.

Bench-kneed conformation causes excess loading of the medial splint bone, which can lead to splints.

== Blind splints ==
Because the splint bone does have some mobility independent of the cannon bone, it can cause tension and strain on the periosteum of the splint bone where the interosseous ligament attaches. The horse will then lay down new bone and the area will become inflamed. "Blind splints" are named because the bony reaction happens on the inside border between the splint bone and cannon bone, where it can not be seen, and is usually not palpable. Besides causing pain as any active splint reaction can, the swelling can impinge on the suspensory ligament. This condition is difficult to diagnose, but ultrasound is generally diagnostic. MRI and CT also show these well.

== Symptoms ==
Splints usually cause mild lameness (a grade of 1–2 out of 5). The injured area is hot, painful, and inflamed with a small bony swelling. However, splints do not always cause lameness, especially once "cold". More severe lameness is sometimes associated with a fractured splint bone, or soft tissue injury adjacent to the splints.

"Blind splints" usually produce mild lameness that is difficult to pinpoint because there is no obvious swelling, pain, or bony changes related to the exterior of the splint bone. At times, bone proliferation on the axial border of the splint bone can be seen radiographically, but ultrasound is much more sensitive for detecting blind splints.

The body will eventually absorb some of the bone it placed down in the splint, flattening out the splint over several months and possibly making it completely disappear.

== Treatment ==
The horse should have a reduced workload for 1–3 weeks. If a trainer does not decrease the workload sufficiently, and the splint bone continues to receive concussion, the injury is likely to continue or worsen. Light exercise on soft ground is best for a horse with splints, as work can help encourage the needed bone growth to heal the splint. Those trainers concerned with the cosmetic appearance of their horse usually prefer to hand-walk twice daily and keep the animal stalled until the splint is resolved, eliminating the chance that the splint will accidentally be knocked during work and the swelling increased.

Several days of cold therapy, sweats, and NSAIDs can help a "hot" splint. NSAIDs can help reduce the inflammation and help the bone growth by doing so. However, none of these treatments are incredibly effective. The most important factor is time. Counter-irritants, which increase inflammation, only hinder the formation of bone and can actually prolong the healing process.

Surgery to remove the fractured end of the splint bone, particularly in the lower third, is typically successful. However, surgical removal of the bone growth in large splints, performed by chiseling it away, usually does not produce satisfying results. Often, bone growth is stimulated by the surgery, and the size of the splint is increased. Only about a third of the time is surgery at all successful.

== Prognosis ==
Prognosis is excellent in uncomplicated cases. The horse will be able to return to full work once the inflammation and pain ceases. Although the horse usually recovers quite quickly, horses with "blind splints" may take longer because there may be impingement on the suspensory ligament. The ossification of the splint is usually a permanent blemish, though over a period of many years, the excess ossification may be remodeled to varying degrees, occasionally to the point that the splint is no longer visible.

== General and cited references ==
- King, Christine, BVSc, MACVSc, and Mansmann, Richard, VDM, PhD (1997). Equine Lameness. Grand Prairie, Tex.: Equine Research, Inc. pp. 752–757. ISBN 9780935842128. OCLC 37104440.
