= Master Charlie =

British-bred Thoroughbred racehorse

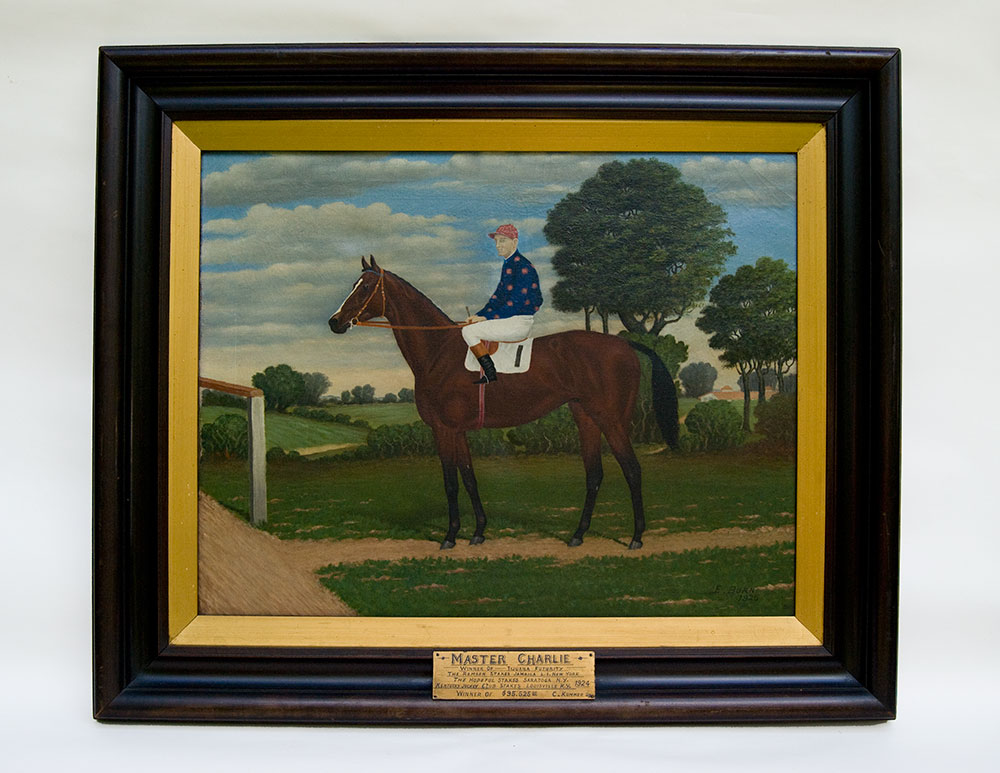
- Master Charlie: Champion American Racehorse 1924
- Sire: Lord Archer
- Grandsire: Spearmint
- Dam: Bachelor's Choice
- Damsire: Bachelor's Double
- Sex: Stallion
- Foaled: 1922
- Country: Great Britain
- Colour: Bay
- Breeder: J. Musker
- Owner: 1) Phil T. Chinn; 2) William Daniel
- Trainer: Andrew G. Blakely
- Record: 12: 7-?-?
- Earnings: US$95,525

Major wins
- Tijuana Futurity (1924); Colorado Stakes (1924); Remsen Stakes (1924); Hopeful Stakes (1924); Kentucky Jockey Club Stakes (1924)

Awards
- American Champion Two-Year-Old Colt (1924)

Master Charlie was a championship thoroughbred American race horse born in Great Britain in 1922, from the line of the famed New Zealand horse Carbine. He was purchased for $1,000 in 1923 by turfman William Daniel of Chicago.

== Pedigree ==
Master Charlie was sired by Lord Archer-Bachelor's Choice, who was sired by Spearmint-Baroness La Fleche, who was sired by Carbine, the famed New Zealand Thoroughbred racehorse. (1)http://www.pedigreequery.com/master+charlie

== Racing career ==
1924 races won by Master Charlie

1. Tijuana Futurity
2. The Remsen Stakes, Jamaica Race Course run by the Metropolitan Jockey Club Jamaica New York. The Remsen Stakes is influential as one of the last graded stakes race for two-year-olds on the New York racing circuit, and its winner is generally among the winterbook favorites for the following year's Kentucky Derby.
3. The Hopeful Stakes, Saratoga Race Course, Saratoga N.Y. The Saratoga Race Course opened in 1863 and is the oldest organized sporting venue of any kind in the United States. Master Charlie won in 1924 with jockey George Babin, posting a time of 1:13:00. The "oral" bookmakers had him at 50 to 1 in the 1924 Hopeful
4. Kentucky Jockey Club Stakes in Louisville Kentucky. Run annually during the last week of November at Churchill Downs in Louisville, Kentucky. A Grade II event, the race is open to two-year-olds willing to race one and one-sixteenth miles on the dirt.

His winnings totaled $95,525, and his career consisted of 12 starts and 7 wins.

Awards of distinction: turf hallmarks include the 1924 American Champion Two-Year-Old Colt championship award.

Sired by Lord Archer, Master Charlie was owned by William Daniel of the Union Stockyards, Chicago, Illinois. In 1924, Master Charlie travelled from New Orleans to the Jamaica track on Long Island. His next race took him to Havre de Grace, where trainer Andrew Blakely started him in the $10,000 Chesapeake Stakes.

== Master Charlie in the press ==
Daily Racing Form, April 21, 1925
Master Charlie Arrives: Reaches Jamaica Track in Fine Fettle and Bodily Health. In April 1926, Master Charlie was the favorite for the Kentucky Derby. The horse traveled from New Orleans to Jamaica with trainer Andy Blakely and jockey George Cooper. Early in the season, Master Charlie was afflicted with splints, but he debutrf in the Chesapeake Stakes at Havre de Grace, a trial for Preakness and Kentucky Derby candidates.

May, 1926, Popular Science Monthly
It's a Game of Glorious Uncertainties: How the Science of Making Race Horses Often Is Upset in the Stern Test of the Track"

After being purchased by $1,000 in 1923, the following year Master Charlie won stakes and purses aggregating $95,525 and was acclaimed by some to be the best horse of any age in the country. But before the first spring stakes of 1925, he developed unsound legs and was withdrawn from racing.

Master Charlie Prize Painting, by listed American Artist Edward Burn, signed and dated 1925, with a list of Master Charlie's race victories and total prize earnings. Mailed to horse owner William Daniel, c/o Exchange Building, Union Stockyards, Chicago.

== See also ==
- List of racehorses
