= Spion Kop (horse) =

Irish-bred Thoroughbred racehorse

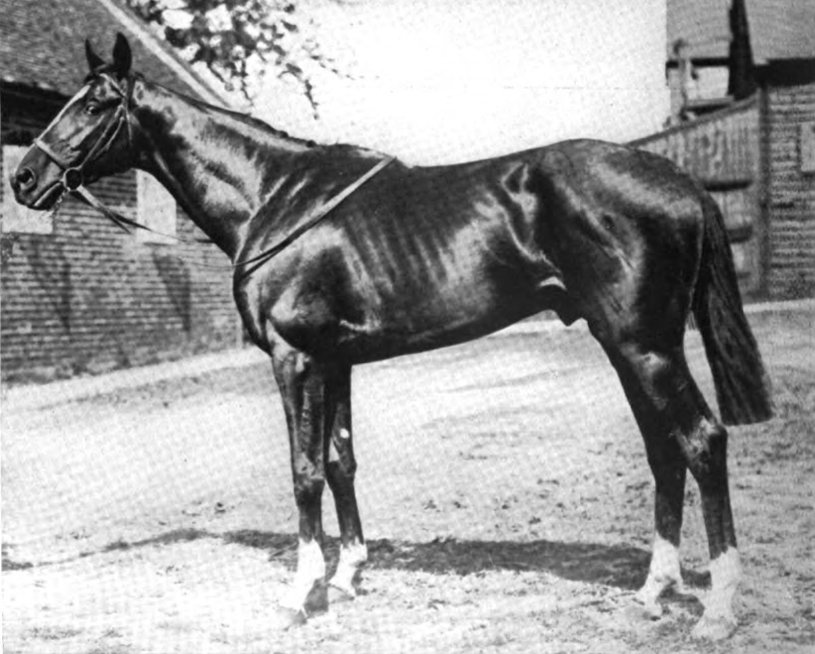
- Sire: Spearmint
- Grandsire: Carbine
- Dam: Hammerkop
- Damsire: Gallinule
- Sex: Stallion
- Foaled: 1917
- Country: Ireland
- Colour: Bay
- Breeder: Giles Loder
- Owner: Giles Loder
- Trainer: Peter Gilpin
- Record: 14: 2-6-2
- Earnings: £

Major wins
- Epsom Derby (1920)

Spion Kop (1917–1941) was an Irish-bred, British-trained Thoroughbred racehorse and sire. In a career that lasted from 1919 until 1921, Spion Kop ran fourteen times winning two races. After an undistinguished early career in which he lost his first six races, he improved as a three-year-old to win The Derby in record time in 1920. After his retirement from racing he had some success as a stallion.

== Background ==
Spion Kop, a "strong, handsome" bay horse with a white blaze and four white socks, was bred by his owner Major Giles Loder who had inherited the Eyrefield Stud near Caragh in County Kildare from his uncle Eustace "Lucky" Loder in 1914. He was named after the Battle of Spion Kop (1900).

Spion Kop's sire Spearmint had been Eustace Loder's most successful horse winning the Derby and the Grand Prix de Paris in 1906. At stud, he was fairly successful, siring Royal Lancer (St Leger), Zionist (Irish Derby) and Plucky Liege. Hammerkop, Spion Kop's dam was a top-class staying racehorse who won the Yorkshire Oaks in 1903 and the Cesarewitch Handicap in 1905, but produced no other winners in a long stud career.

Spion Kop was sent into training with Peter Gilpin at his Clarehaven Stables at Newmarket, Suffolk.

== Racing career ==
=== 1919: two-year-old season ===
As the offspring of two slow-maturing stayers, Spion Kop was not expected to excel as a two-year-old in 1919. He failed to win in six starts, but showed some consistency by reaching the frame in all his races, finishing second five times and third once. At the end of the year, in the Free Handicap, a rating list of the leading juveniles, Spion Kop was given a weight of 102 pounds, suggesting that he was at least twenty pounds below top class.

=== 1920: three-year-old season ===
In the spring of 1920 there were rumours that Spion Kop had made exceptional improvement and was likely to be a major contender for the Derby. On his debut in May he went some way towards substantiating the stories when he won a race at Kempton impressively, and his odds for the Derby were cut to 9/1. He did not run again in public but was instead tried in a private trial race against the best of his trainer's other three-year-olds. He was well beaten by his stable companions, finishing last of the four runners behind Sarchedon, Comrade and Paragon, and a result his odds for the Derby lengthened again. The stable jockey Arthur Smith, who had rejected the eventual winner Grand Parade in the 1919 Derby, was instructed to ride Sarchedon at Epsom, with the mount on Spion Kop being given to the American Frank O'Neill.

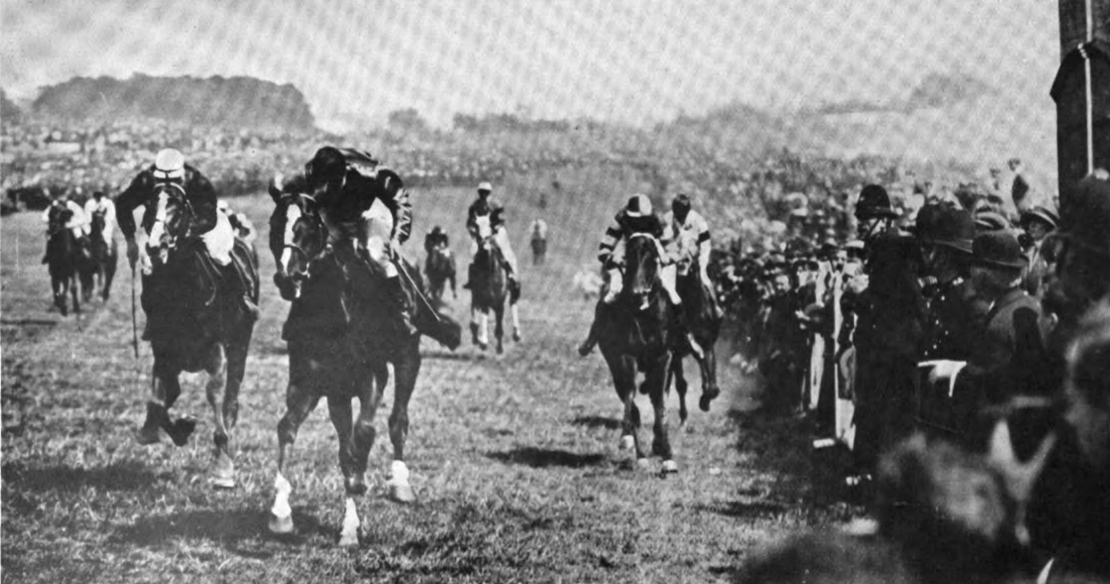
Spion Kop (foreground) wins the Epsom Derby.

The Derby was run on an unusually hot day in front of an estimated crowd of 250,000 including the King and Queen. Spion Kop started at odd of 100/6 (approximately 16/1) in a field of 19 runners. The favourite was the 2000 Guineas winner Tetratema a colt noted for his exceptional early speed but with dubious stamina. Tetratema went into an early lead and set an extremely fast pace as he was challenged by Abbot's Trace (ridden by Steve Donoghue), while O'Neill settled Spion Kop well back in the field. Tetratema dropped back soon after half way and Abbot's Trace led into the straight as Spion Kop made rapid progress from the rear. Spion Kop took the lead three furlongs from the finish and ran on strongly up the straight to win by two lengths from Archaic and Orpheus in a new race record time of 2:34.8. The most dramatic incident of the race occurred in the closing stages when Abbot's Trace was brought down in a collision with Sarchedon, who finished fourth.

Spion Kop then attempted to emulate his sire by travelling to France for the Grand Prix de Paris at Longchamp, a much anticipated event, which, with a first prize of £12,000, was the most valuable race in the world at the time. Having narrowly escaped a fire which destroyed his horse-box, Spion Kop started joint-favourite, but finished unplaced behind Comrade. There were excuses however, as the race was extremely rough, with one report claiming that Spion Kop had been "treated like a shuttlecock". Spion Kop failed to recover his form in autumn. He prepared for the St Leger by taking on Abbott's Trace in a two-runner race for the Derbyshire Three-Year-Old Plate at Derby and was beaten a short head in a "desperate" finish. He nevertheless started favourite for the St Leger but finished unplaced behind Caligula. On his final start he was unplaced again behind Orpheus in the Champion Stakes .

=== 1921: four-year-old season ===
Spion Kop failed to re-establish his reputation in two starts as a four-year-old. He returned to Epsom's Derby meeting for the Coronation Cup but finished well beaten behind Silvern. At Royal Ascot he was moved up in distance to two and a half miles for the Ascot Gold Cup and produced his best performance in over a year by finishing third (promoted from fourth) to Periosteum. There were hopes that he would appear later in the year in the Cesarewitch or the Cambridgeshire Handicap, but he never ran again.

== Assessment ==
In their book A Century of Champions, John Randall and Tony Morris rated Spion Kop a "poor" Derby winner. More specifically, they rated him equal with Aboyeur as one of the two worst colts to have won the race in the 20th Century. Spion Kop was not even the best middle distance colt in his own stable, that honour clearly belonging to Comrade.

== Stud career ==
Spion Kop was retired to his owner's Old Connell Stud, near Newbridge, County Kildare, where he became a "respectable" sire with a clear tendency to produce runners with stamina. His most notable progeny included Felstead, Kopi (Irish Derby) and Bongrace (Doncaster Cup). His son The Bastard won the Yorkshire Cup and, after being renamed The Buzzard was twice the leading stallion in Australia, siring the Melbourne Cup winner Rainbird.

Spion Kop died in 1941 and was buried at the Eyrefield Stud.

== Sire line tree ==
- Spion Kop
  - Felstead
  - Kopi
  - The Buzzard
    - Old Rowley
  - Hill Song
  - Landscape Hill
    - Cromwell
    - Monaveen
  - Battle Song

== Pedigree ==
Pedigree of Spion Kop (IRE), bay stallion, 1917
Sire Spearmint (GB) 1903	Carbine; 1885	Musket	Toxophilite
Sire Spearmint (GB) 1903	Carbine; 1885	Musket	West Australian mare
Sire Spearmint (GB) 1903	Carbine; 1885	Mersey	Knowsley
Sire Spearmint (GB) 1903	Carbine; 1885	Mersey	Clemence
Sire Spearmint (GB) 1903	Maid of the Mint; 1897	Minting	Lord Lyon
Sire Spearmint (GB) 1903	Maid of the Mint; 1897	Minting	Mint Sauce
Sire Spearmint (GB) 1903	Maid of the Mint; 1897	Warble	Skylark
Sire Spearmint (GB) 1903	Maid of the Mint; 1897	Warble	Coturnix*
Dam Hammerkop (GB) 1900	Gallinule; 1884	Isonomy	Sterling
Dam Hammerkop (GB) 1900	Gallinule; 1884	Isonomy	Isola Bella
Dam Hammerkop (GB) 1900	Gallinule; 1884	Moorhen	Hermit
Dam Hammerkop (GB) 1900	Gallinule; 1884	Moorhen	sister to Ryshworth
Dam Hammerkop (GB) 1900	Concussion; 1885	Reverberation	Thunderbolt*
Dam Hammerkop (GB) 1900	Concussion; 1885	Reverberation	The Golden Horn
Dam Hammerkop (GB) 1900	Concussion; 1885	Astwith	Wenlock
Dam Hammerkop (GB) 1900	Concussion; 1885	Astwith	Skirmisher mare (Family: 19)

* Spion Kop is inbred 5D x 4D to the stallion Thunderbolt, meaning that he appears fifth generation (via Coturnix) and fourth generation on the dam side of his pedigree.
