= Minting (horse) =

British Thoroughbred racehorse

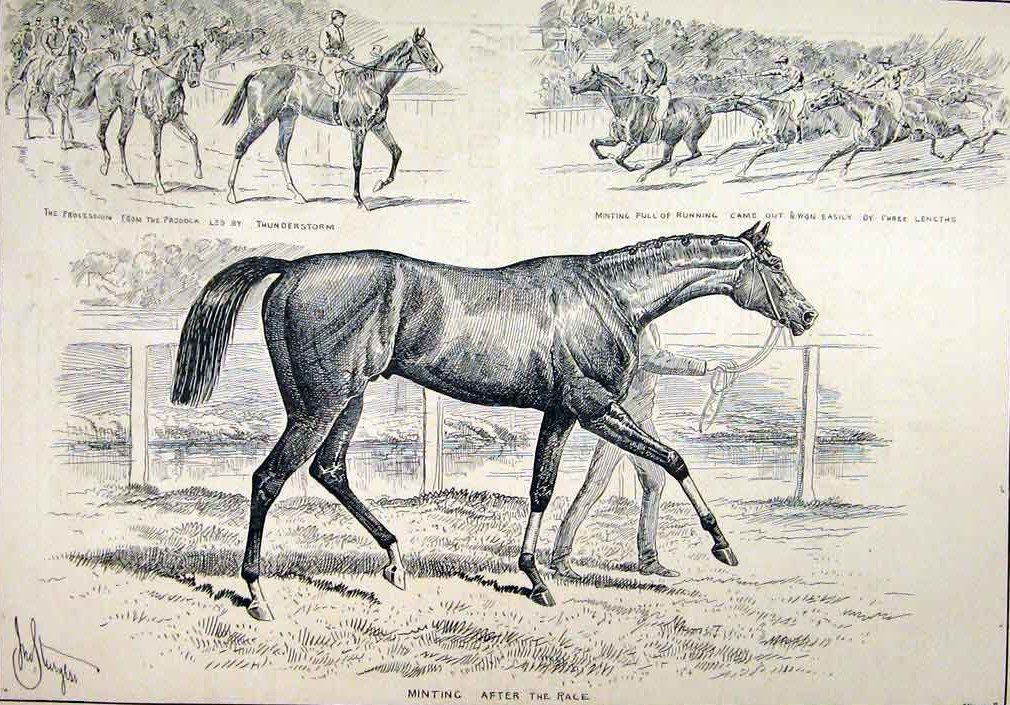
- Minting at Kempton 1888
- Sire: Lord Lyon
- Grandsire: Stockwell
- Dam: Mint Sauce
- Damsire: Young Melbourne
- Sex: Stallion
- Foaled: 1883
- Country: United Kingdom
- Colour: Bay
- Breeder: William Beauclerk, 10th Duke of St Albans
- Owner: Robert Charles de Grey Vyner
- Trainer: Mathew Dawson
- Record: 12:9-3-0
- Earnings: £

Major wins
- Seaton Delaval Stakes (1885); Champagne Stakes (1885); Middle Park Plate (1885); Grand Prix de Paris (1886); Great Jubilee Handicap (1888); Hardwicke Stakes (1888)

Minting (1883–1909) was a British Thoroughbred racehorse and sire. In a career that lasted from 1885 to 1888 he ran twelve times and won nine races. He was the leading British two-year-old of 1885 and went on to win the Grand Prix de Paris in June 1886. His career was often overshadowed by that of his contemporary Ormonde who defeated him on both of the occasions they met on the racecourse.

== Background ==
Minting was a “gigantic” bay horse standing just over 16 hands high, bred by the Duke of St. Albans. He was later acquired by Robert Charles de Grey Vyner and sent into training with Mathew Dawson at Heath House stable at Newmarket, Suffolk.

Minting’s sire Lord Lyon, who died in 1887, was an outstanding racehorse who won the English Triple Crown in 1866. He was not a great success as a stallion: apart from Minting his only notable offspring was the filly Placida, who won The Oaks in 1877. Indeed, Lord Lyon had been almost forgotten before the arrival of Minting. Minting was one of three Classic winners produced by the mare Mint Sauce. She had already foaled The Lambkin who won the St Leger in 1884 and went on to produce the 1000 Guineas winner Minthe.

Apart from the obvious reference to his dam, Minting's name also refers to the Lincolnshire village, near which his owner kept a residence called Minting Lodge.

== Racing career ==
=== 1885: two-year-old season ===
Minting made his debut at Newcastle, where he won the £470 Seaton Delaval Stakes. At Goodwood in July Minting won the Prince of Wales’s Stakes in impressive fashion, causing a writer for Bell's Life to predict that he could become one of the best horses “within men’s memory.” In the Champagne Stakes at Doncaster on 15 September he started at odds of 20/55 against five opponents. Ridden by Fred Archer, he took the lead and won very easily by one and a half lengths from Gay Hermit. At Newmarket in October he won a three runner race for the Triennial Produce Stakes and was then sent to contest the Middle Park Plate, at that time the most prestigious two-year-old race of the season. He started at odds of 4/7 with Saraband being regarded as his most serious rival. Minting appeared to be unsuited by the heavy ground, but was driven out to win by a neck from Braw Lass, with Saraband third. Following this victory he ended his first season unbeaten in five races and was quoted at odds of 4/1 for the following year’s Derby. With the other unbeaten colts Ormonde and The Bard in contention the crop of three-year-old for the following season looked to be the strongest for many years.

=== 1886: three-year-old season ===
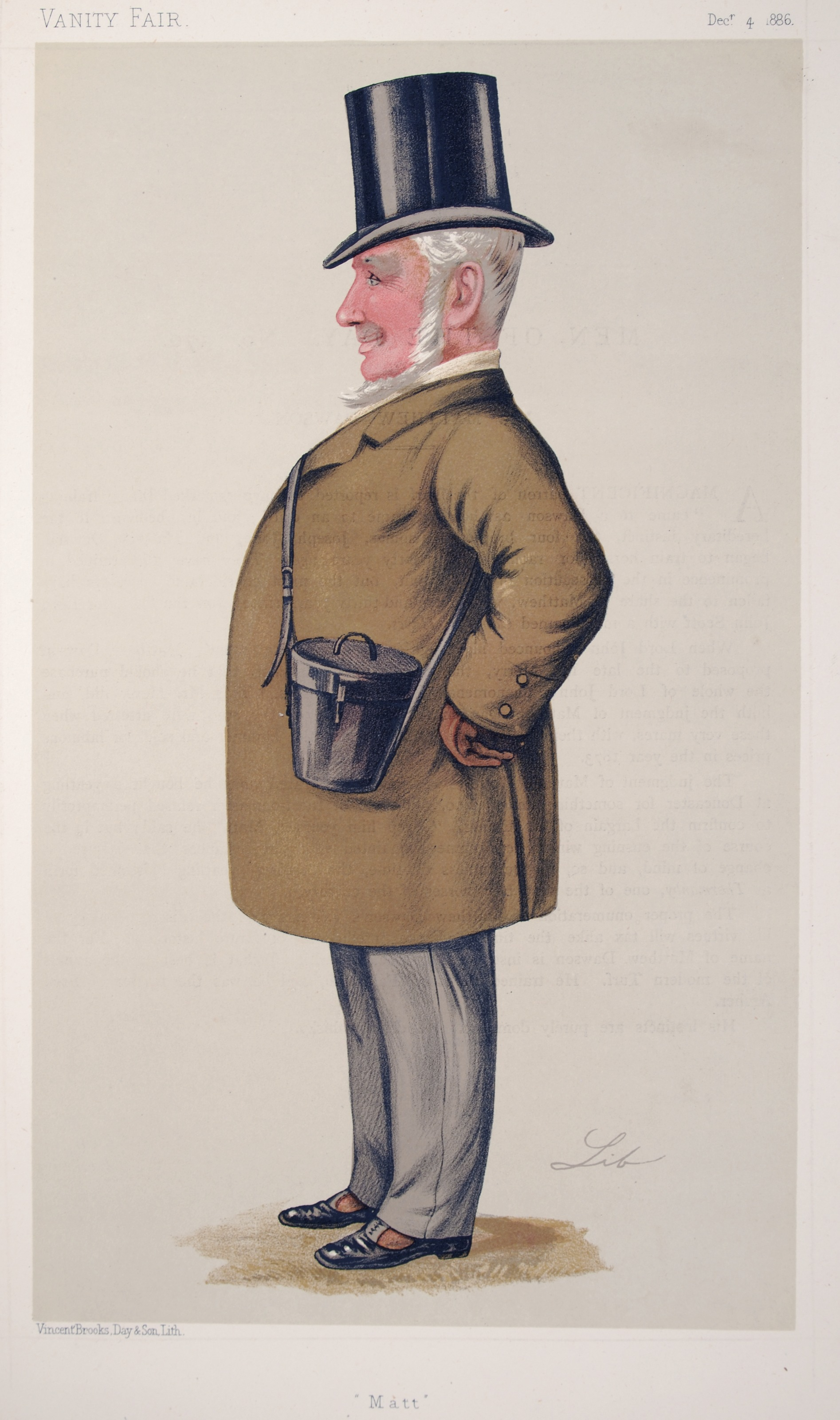
Mathew Dawson, Minting's trainer

In early 1886 the betting for the Classics was dominated by Minting and the also undefeated Ormonde, In March Minting was 2/1 favourite for the 2000 Guineas with Ormonde on 5/2, while the colts were 11/2 joint favourites for the Derby. On 28 April Minting started the 2000 Guineas at Newmarket at odds of 11/10. The race was run at an exceptionally strong pace and Minting, ridden by John Watts, tracked the leaders in the early stages before moving up to dispute the lead with Ormonde just after half way. Minting went a neck in front as the two colts drew away from the rest of the field, but Ormonde’s superiority became evident as he pulled away in the closing stages to win by two lengths. There was a gap of ten lengths back to Mephisto in third.

Rather than take on Ormonde again in the Derby, Minting’s connections opted to wait for the Grand Prix de Paris on 6 June. This race, run over 3000m at Longchamp, was the most valuable and important race in France. Minting started at odds of 4/6 in a field which included The Oaks winner Miss Jummy and the French colts Sycamore and Upas, who had dead-heated for the Prix du Jockey Club. Ridden by Archer, Minting was held up at the back of the field in the early stages as the outsider Polyeucte opened up a big lead. 400m from the finish, as other runners began to struggle on the heavy ground, Minting began to make rapid progress, catching Polyeucte in the closing stages and winning by two lengths “without the semblance of an effort.” His win was enthusiastically received by the British contingent in the crowd. According to one report, Minting’s win was so easy that Archer had been able to pull him up to a walk at the line.

Minting had been strongly fancied since the start of the season for the inaugural running of the Eclipse Stakes at Sandown in July but on the eve of the race he sustained a tendon injury in exercise, which ruled him out of the event. The injury provoked such “sinister rumours” that Minting’s connections published the colt’s veterinary notes to prove their version of events. In fact the injury was so serious that Minting was unable to run again that year.

=== 1887: four-year-old season ===
Minting returned on 7 June at Royal Ascot when he ran in the Jubilee Handicap over one mile. Ridden by the veteran John Osborne, he won easily from St Mirin, who was receiving twelve pounds, with the Eclipse Stakes winner Bendigo finishing a remote third. This performance, together with Ormonde’s worsening wind trouble (he had become a roarer), made the second meeting between the two colts in the Hardwicke Stakes three days later a much-anticipated one. Minting, starting 7/4 second favourite, took the lead and set a strong pace with the hope of exposing any weaknesses in the favourites breathing. He turned back several challengers before Ormonde moved up alongside him in the straight. A “magnificent race” ensued, in which Minting was beaten a neck amid scenes of the wildest excitement.

=== 1888: five-year-old season ===
On his five-year-old debut, Minting ran in the Great Jubilee Handicap over one mile at Kempton. He won the race by three lengths “in a canter” carrying 140 pounds, conceding 46 pounds to the runner-up. The win led to Minting being described as the crack horse of the English Turf. Another writer opined that in beating such a strong field, so easily with such a weight was "a feat I have never seen, nor shall I ever again." In June he returned to Royal Ascot for a much less competitive renewal of the Hardwicke Stakes in which he had no difficulty conceding 46 pounds to his only opponent, a three-year-old filly named Love in Idleness. He missed his other target at the meeting, the Royal Hunt Cup, having been assigned an unprecedented weight of 156 pounds.

When it was announced shortly afterwards that Minting would be retiring to stud at the end of the season, his “book” of mares was filled within a day. In autumn, he was sent to Newmarket for the Champion Stakes on October 10 against six rivals. He started 60/100 favourite but was beaten half a length by the three-year-old Friar’s Balsam.

== Assessment ==
Minting's earnings of £7,396 were the third highest by any horse in 1885. In early 1888 the official handicappers rated Minting fifteen pound superior to the winners of the Derby (Merry Hampton) and the St Leger (Kilwarlin), and he was regarded as the best horse in training. In commenting on the strength of the 1886 three-year-olds it was claimed that Minting could have won the Derby "nine years out of ten."

== Stud career ==
Minting retired to stud at Fairfield, near York at an initial fee of 100 guineas. His most notable progeny was the filly Maid of the Mint, dam of Spearmint. His son Minstrel, won the Ascot Derby.

== Pedigree ==
Pedigree of Minting (GB), bay stallion, 1883
| Sire Lord Lyon (GB) 1863 | Stockwell; 1849 | The Baron | Birdcatcher |
| Sire Lord Lyon (GB) 1863 | Stockwell; 1849 | The Baron | Echidna |
| Sire Lord Lyon (GB) 1863 | Stockwell; 1849 | Pocahontas | Glencoe |
| Sire Lord Lyon (GB) 1863 | Stockwell; 1849 | Pocahontas | Marpessa |
| Sire Lord Lyon (GB) 1863 | Paradigm; 1852 | Paragone | Touchstone |
| Sire Lord Lyon (GB) 1863 | Paradigm; 1852 | Paragone | Hoyden |
| Sire Lord Lyon (GB) 1863 | Paradigm; 1852 | Ellen Horne | Redshank |
| Sire Lord Lyon (GB) 1863 | Paradigm; 1852 | Ellen Horne | Delhi |
| Dam Mint Sauce (GB) 1875 | Young Melbourne; 1855 | Melbourne | Humphrey Clinker |
| Dam Mint Sauce (GB) 1875 | Young Melbourne; 1855 | Melbourne | Cervantes mare |
| Dam Mint Sauce (GB) 1875 | Young Melbourne; 1855 | Clarissa | Pantaloon |
| Dam Mint Sauce (GB) 1875 | Young Melbourne; 1855 | Clarissa | Glencoe mare |
| Dam Mint Sauce (GB) 1875 | Sycee; 1864 | Marsyas | Orlando |
| Dam Mint Sauce (GB) 1875 | Sycee; 1864 | Marsyas | Malibran |
| Dam Mint Sauce (GB) 1875 | Sycee; 1864 | Rose of Kent | Kingston |
| Dam Mint Sauce (GB) 1875 | Sycee; 1864 | Rose of Kent | Englands Beauty (Family:1-o) |
