= 1920 in sports =

1920 in sports describes the year's events in world sport.

== American football ==
- NFL championship – Akron Pros (8–0–3)
- Rose Bowl (1919 season):
  - The Harvard Crimson won 7–6 over the Oregon Webfoots to win the college football national championship
- 17 September — the National Football League (NFL) is founded as the American Professional Football Association in Canton, Ohio. Of the teams in the current NFL, only the Decatur Staleys (renamed the Chicago Bears) and the Racine (Chicago) Cardinals (the current Arizona Cardinals) remain in existence.
- 14 December — Death of Notre Dame player George Gipp (1895–1920), mainly remembered for his deathbed quote to coach Knute Rockne: "Win just one for the Gipper".

== Association football ==
- First women's international football game takes place between a French team and an English team with 25,000 spectators in attendance.

England

- The Football League – West Bromwich Albion 60 points, Burnley 51, Chelsea 49, Liverpool 48, Sunderland 48, Bolton Wanderers 47
- FA Cup final – Aston Villa 1–0 Huddersfield Town (after extra time) at Stamford Bridge, London
- The Football League is expanded by the formation of the original Third Division. New clubs admitted to the league include Leeds United and Cardiff City, who are both elected to the Second Division. New members in the Third Division are: Brentford, Brighton & Hove Albion, Bristol Rovers, Crystal Palace, Exeter City, Gillingham, Luton Town, Merthyr Town (1920 – 1930), Millwall, Newport County (1920 – 1988), Northampton Town, Norwich City, Plymouth Argyle, Portsmouth, Queens Park Rangers (QPR), Reading, Southampton, Southend United, Swansea Town, Swindon Town and Watford.

Germany

- National Championship – 1. FC Nürnberg 2–0 SpVgg Fürth at Frankfurt

== Athletics ==
Men's 100 metres

- Jackson Scholz (USA) equals the world record of 10.6 seconds.

== Australian rules football ==
VFL Premiership

- 2 October – Richmond wins the 24th VFL Premiership, defeating Collingwood 7.10 (52) to 5.5 (35) in the Grand Final

South Australian Football League

- 18 September – North Adelaide defeat Norwood 10.9 (69) to 3.3 (21) to win its fourth SAFL premiership.

West Australian Football League

- 25 September – East Perth defeats East Fremantle 6.16 (52) to 4.6 (30) to win its second consecutive premiership.

== Bandy ==
Sweden

- Championship final – IFK Uppsala 3–2 IF Linnéa

== Baseball ==
World Series

- 5–12 October — Cleveland Indians (AL) defeats Brooklyn Dodgers (NL) by 5 games to 2 to win the 1920 World Series

Major League Baseball

- The sale of Babe Ruth. Boston Red Sox transfers Babe Ruth to New York Yankees for $125,000 and a $350,000 loan. Ruth hits 54 home runs for the Yankees in 1920, nearly double the record of 29 he hit in the 1919 season.
- 16 August — Ray Chapman of Cleveland Indians is hit on the head by a fastball from Carl Mays of New York Yankees. He dies early next day, the second fatality of major league play.
- Chicago White Sox stars Eddie Cicotte and Shoeless Joe Jackson confess their roles in the Black Sox scandal

Negro leagues

- 13 February — the Negro National League is formed
- 2 May — the first game of the new league is played at Indianapolis with the Indianapolis ABCs defeating the Chicago Giants (not to be confused with the Chicago American Giants)
- Chicago American Giants wins the inaugural Negro National League pennant

== Basketball ==
Italy

- A first match held on professional league of Italy, Lega Basket Serie A.

== Boxing ==
Events

- 6 May – Johnny Wilson wins the World Middleweight Championship by defeating Mike O'Dowd in 12 rounds at Boston.
- 12 October – Georges Carpentier wins the World Light Heavyweight Championship after he knocks out Battling Levinsky in the 4th round at Jersey City, his victory setting up the first "million dollar gate" when he fights Jack Dempsey in 1921.
- 22 December – Joe Lynch defeats Pete Herman in 15 rounds at New York to win the World Bantamweight Championship.

Lineal world champions

- World Heavyweight Championship – Jack Dempsey
- World Light Heavyweight Championship – Battling Levinsky → Georges Carpentier
- World Middleweight Championship – Mike O'Dowd → Johnny Wilson
- World Welterweight Championship – Jack Britton
- World Lightweight Championship – Benny Leonard
- World Featherweight Championship – Johnny Kilbane
- World Bantamweight Championship – Pete Herman → Joe Lynch
- World Flyweight Championship – Jimmy Wilde

== Canadian football ==
Grey Cup

- 8th Grey Cup – University of Toronto Varsity Blues 16–3 Toronto Argonauts

== Cricket ==
Events

- Post-war recovery continues and an English team goes to Australia in November to commence the first Test series since the war.
- Derbyshire suffer the ignominy of a perfectly bad season, losing all seventeen county matches with any play. This is the second and last time this has occurred in county cricket, and the only time in the official County Championship.

England

- County Championship – Middlesex
- Minor Counties Championship – Staffordshire
- Most runs – Jack Hobbs 2827 @ 58.89 (HS 215)
- Most wickets – Frank Woolley 185 @ 14.23 (BB 7–59)
- Wisden Cricketer of the Year – Plum Warner

Australia

- Sheffield Shield – New South Wales
- Most runs – Roy Park 648 @ 72.00 (HS 228)
- Most wickets – Stork Hendry 29 @ 18.13 (BB 7–34)

India

- Bombay Quadrangular – Hindus

New Zealand

- Plunket Shield – Auckland

South Africa

- Currie Cup – Western Province

West Indies

- Inter-Colonial Tournament – not contested

== Cycling ==
Tour de France

- Philippe Thys (Belgium) wins the 14th Tour de France

Giro d'Italia

- Gaetano Belloni of Bianchi wins the eighth Giro d'Italia

== Field hockey ==
Olympic Games (Men's Competition)

- Gold Medal – Great Britain
- Silver Medal – Denmark
- Bronze Medal – Belgium

== Figure skating ==
World Figure Skating Championships

- The championships are not contested

1920 Summer Olympics

- Men's individual – Gillis Grafström (Sweden)
- Women's individual – Magda Mauroy-Julin (Sweden)
- Pairs – Ludowika Jakobsson and Walter Jakobsson (Finland)

== Golf ==
Major tournaments

- British Open – George Duncan
- US Open – Ted Ray
- USPGA Championship – Jock Hutchison

Other tournaments

- British Amateur – Cyril Tolley
- US Amateur – Chick Evans

== Horse racing ==
Events

- The inaugural Prix de l'Arc de Triomphe is won by Comrade

England

- Grand National – Troytown
- 1,000 Guineas Stakes – Cinna
- 2,000 Guineas Stakes – Tetratema
- The Derby – Spion Kop
- The Oaks – Charlebelle
- St. Leger Stakes – Caligula

Australia

- Melbourne Cup – Poitrel

Canada

- King's Plate – St. Paul

France

- Prix de l'Arc de Triomphe – Comrade

Ireland

- Irish Grand National – Halston
- Irish Derby Stakes – He Goes

USA

- Kentucky Derby – Paul Jones
- Preakness Stakes – Man o' War
- Belmont Stakes – Man o' War

== Ice hockey ==
Events

- Ice hockey is held at the 1920 Summer Olympics and is the second winter sport to feature at the Olympics — 4 years before the inaugural Winter Games is held

1920 Summer Olympics

- Gold Medal – Canada
- Silver Medal – USA
- Bronze Medal – Czechoslovakia

Stanley Cup

- 22 March – 1 April — Ottawa Senators (NHL) defeats Seattle Metropolitans (PCHA) in the 1920 Stanley Cup Final by three games to two

Events

- Allan Cup – Winnipeg Falcons
- 1920 Memorial Cup – Toronto Canoe Club Paddlers defeated Selkirk Fishermen by two game total of 15-5
- 22 December — Hamilton Tigers, the reconstituted Quebec Bulldogs franchise, wins its first-ever NHL game in Hamilton, defeating Montreal Canadiens 5–0

== Olympic Games ==
1920 Summer Olympics

- The 1920 Summer Olympics takes place in Antwerp
- The 1916 Summer Olympics planned for Berlin having been cancelled due to World War I, the 1920 Games are awarded to Antwerp to "honour the suffering of the Belgian people"
- United States wins the most medals (95) and the most gold medals (41)

== Rowing ==
The Boat Race

- 28 March — Cambridge wins the 72nd Oxford and Cambridge Boat Race, contested for the first time since March 1914

== Rugby league ==
- The 1920 Great Britain Lions tour of Australia and New Zealand takes place mid-year.

England

- Championship – Hull
- Challenge Cup final – Huddersfield 21–10 Wigan at Headingley Rugby Stadium, Leeds
- Lancashire League Championship – Widnes
- Yorkshire League Championship – Huddersfield
- Lancashire County Cup – Oldham 7–0 Rochdale Hornets
- Yorkshire County Cup – Huddersfield 24–5 Leeds

Australia

- NSW Premiership – Balmain (outright winner)

== Rugby union ==
Five Nations Championship

- 33rd Five Nations Championship series is shared by England, Scotland and Wales

== Speed skating ==
Speed Skating World Championships

- not contested

== Tennis ==
Australia

- Australian Men's Singles Championship – Pat O'Hara Wood (Australia) defeats Ronald Thomas (Australia) 6–3 4–6 6–8 6–1 6–3

England

- Wimbledon Men's Singles Championship – Bill Tilden (USA) defeats Gerald Patterson (Australia) 2–6 6–3 6–2 6–4
- Wimbledon Women's Singles Championship – Suzanne Lenglen (France) defeats Dorothea Douglass Lambert Chambers (GB) 6–3 6–0

France

- French Men's Singles Championship – André Gobert (France) defeats Max Decugis (France) 6–3 3–6 1–6 6–2 6–3
- French Women's Singles Championship – Suzanne Lenglen (France) defeats Marguerite Broquedis (France) 6–1 7–5

USA

- American Men's Singles Championship – Bill Tilden (USA) defeats Bill Johnston (USA) 6–1 1–6 7–5 5–7 6–3
- American Women's Singles Championship – Molla Bjurstedt Mallory (Norway) defeats Marion Zinderstein (USA) 6–3 6–1

Davis Cup

- 1920 International Lawn Tennis Challenge – United States 5–0 Australasia at Domain Cricket Club (grass) Auckland, New Zealand

== Yacht racing ==
America's Cup

- The New York Yacht Club retains the America's Cup as Resolute defeats British challenger Shamrock IV, of the Royal Ulster Yacht Club, 10 races to 2
