= Bob Sweeney =

Bob Sweeney may refer to:

- Bob KO Sweeney (1894–1961), American boxer
- Bob Sweeney (ice hockey) (born 1964), American professional ice hockey player
- Bob Sweeney (actor and director) (1918–1992), television actor, director and producer
- Dr. Bob Sweeney, a fictional character appearing in the 1998 film American History X

== See also ==
- Robert Sweeney (disambiguation)
