= Dave Rosenberg =

American boxer

Personal information
- Nickname: Brooklyn Boxer
- Nationality: American
- Born: May 15, 1901 New York City, New York
- Died: February 1, 1979 (aged 77)
- Weight: Middleweight

Boxing career

Dave Rosenberg was an American boxer born in New York City on May 15, 1901 and died February 1, 1979.

== Amateur career ==
Rosenberg was managed by Joe Schwinger and won the National and New York State Amateur Championship titles in 1919 before turning professional in October of that year.

== Professional career ==
Rosenberg fought as a professional boxer from 1919-1925 and held the NYSAC middleweight championship briefly in 1922 when he defeated Phil Krug for the vacant title on August 14, 1922 at the Veledrome in Brooklyn, New York City. This championship garnered the attention of Mike O'Dowd, and the two scheduled a fifteen round fight at 160 pounds. Losing that fight, Rosenberg became one of the shortest reigning champions in boxing history, having only held his championship for 109 days before his defeated by O'Dowd.
