= Robert Sweeney =

Robert Sweeney or Sweeny may refer to:

- Robert Augustus Sweeney (1853–1890), American, two-time recipient of the Medal of Honor
- Robert E. Sweeney (1924–2007), American politician
- Robert K. Sweeney (born 1949), American politician
- Robert Sweeny Jr. (1911–1983), American amateur golfer and socialite

== See also ==
- Bob Sweeney (disambiguation)
