= Nicer =

Irish-bred Thoroughbred racehorse

- Sire: Pennine Walk
- Grandsire: Persian Bold
- Dam: Everything Nice
- Damsire: Sovereign Path
- Sex: Mare
- Foaled: 19 March 1990
- Country: Ireland
- Colour: Grey
- Breeder: Barronstown Bloodstock Ltd
- Owner: Catherine Corbett; Fahd Salman
- Trainer: Barry Hills; Neil Drysdale
- Record: 13: 3-1-1
- Earnings: £186,987

Major wins
- Masaka Stakes (1993); Irish 1000 Guineas (1993)

Nicer (19 March 1990 – after 2012) was an Irish-bred, British-trained Thoroughbred racehorse and broodmare. She showed promise as a two-year-old in 1992 although she won only one minor race from five attempts. She reached her peak in the following spring when she won the Masaka Stakes before recording her biggest victory in the Irish 1000 Guineas. She was beaten in her next four races and was then exported to the United States where she failed to win. She was retired to become a broodmare but her foals made very little impact on the racecourse.

== Background ==
Nicer was a grey mare bred in Ireland by Barronstown Bloodstock Ltd. As a yearling in October 1991 Nicer was offered for sale at Tattersalls and was bought for 27,000 guineas by the bloodstock agent Charles Gordon-Watson. The filly entered the ownership of Catherine Corbett and was sent into training with Barry Hills at Lambourn in Berkshire.

Nicer was one of the best horses foaled by Pennine Walk, who won the Jersey Stakes in 1985 and the Queen Anne Stakes in 1986. Her dam Everything Nice was a high-class racemare who won the Cherry Hinton Stakes in 1975 and the Musidora Stakes in 1976. She was a distant female-line descendant of the British mare Cinna who won the 1000 Guineas in 1920 and was the ancestor of numerous major winners including Sunday Silence and Dulcify.

== Racing career ==
=== 1992: two-year-old season ===
On her racecourse debut, Nicer started a 25/1 outsider in a maiden race over seven furlongs at Goodwood Racecourse on 28 July and finished fifth of the fourteen runners behind the favourite Magique Rond Point. In a similar event at Yarmouth on 19 August she took the lead approaching the final furlong but was caught on the finish line and beaten a short head by the Michael Stoute-trained Iviza. Despite her two defeats at maiden level the filly was then stepped up to Group One class when she was sent to Ireland for the Moyglare Stud Stakes at the Curragh on 5 September and finished fifth behind Sayyedati. On 3 October was dropped in class and distance for a six-furlong maiden race at Newmarket Racecourse in which she was ridden as in two of her three previous starts by Darryll Holland. Starting the 11/4 second choice in the betting she took the lead in the last quarter mile and recorded her first victory as she won by one and a half lengths from Golden Guest. Just over two weeks later Nicer ended her season in the Listed Radley Stakes at Newbury Racecourse and led briefly in the last quarter mile before finishing fourth behind the favourite Criquette.

=== 1993: three-year-old season ===
Nicer began her second season on 10 April at Kempton Park Racecourse when she contested the Masaka Stakes a minor trial for the 1000 Guineas (a race for which she was not entered). Ajfan (runner-up in the Fillies' Mile) and the Henry Cecil-trained Helvellyn were made the joint-favourites with Nicer, ridden by Holland, starting a 14/1 outsider. After being restrained in the early stages, she was switched to the outside to race up the stands-side (the left-hand side from the jockeys' viewpoint), thereby capitalising on the faster ground on that side. She took the lead two furlongs out and "ran on strongly" to win by three and a half lengths from Ajfan. After the race Barry Hills admitted to some regret that he had not entered the filly in the 1000 Guineas, saying that "£900 seemed a lot to pay for a Guineas entry at the time, but I suppose I must regret it to an extent now; but there are other races to be won with her. When the ground is soft it is always best under the rails and that was the plan".

Michael Hills took over the ride when Nicer started at odds of 8/1 in a fourteen-runner field for the Irish 1000 Guineas over one mile on yielding ground at the Curragh on 22 May. The Nell Gwyn Stakes runner-up Zarani Sidi Anna was made favourite while the other fancied runners included Ajfan, Dayflower (Middleton Stakes), Asema (C L Weld Park Stakes), Danse Royale (Derrinstown Stud 1,000 Guineas Trial), Miami Sands (Leopardstown 1,000 Guineas Trial Stakes) and Felawnah (fourth in the 1000 Guineas). Nicer was held up by Hills as first the outsider Chanzi, and then Dayflower set the pace, but began to make progress approaching the last quarter mile. She overtook Dayflower a furlong and a half from the finish and "ran on well" to win by two lengths and a short head from Goodnight Kiss and Danse Royale.

At Royal Ascot in June Nicer started 7/4 favourite in a five-runner field for the Group One Coronation Stakes but never looked likely to win and finished fourth behind Gold Splash, Elizabeth Bay and Zarani Sidi Anna. Racing on much firmer ground in the Falmouth Stakes at Newmarket in July she made no impression and finished ninth behind Niche, beaten 26 lengths by the winner. After a three-month break, Nicer was matched against male opposition for the first time when she was sent to Italy to contest the Group One Premio Vittorio di Capua over 1600 metres on heavy ground in Milan. She took the lead on the final turn but was overtaken in the straight and finished third behind the colts Alhijaz and Pelder. Less than three weeks after her run in Italy the filly was sent to the United States to contest the Queen Elizabeth II Challenge Cup Stakes at Keeneland Racecourse. She started 6/1 third favourite but ran poorly and finished last of the nine runners.

In December 1993 Nicer was offered for sale at Tattersalls and was bought for 270,000 guineas by the bloodstock agent Anthony Penfold on behalf of Fahd Salman.

=== 1994: four-year-old season ===
Nicer remained in the United States as a four-year-old in 1994 and was trained by Neil Drysdale. She made two appearances, finishing third in an allowance race at Santa Anita Park in February and ninth in the Bayou Handicap at Fair Grounds Race Course in March.

== Breeding record ==
Nicer became a broodmare for Andrew Lloyd Webber's Watership Down Stud and produced four foals before being exported to Japan. In all she had ten named foals, three of whom won minor races:

- Demeter, a bay filly, foaled in 1997, sired by Diesis. Third on her only start.
- Chablis, bay filly, 1998, by Kingmambo. Failed to win in six races.
- Night Wolf, grey colt (later gelded), 2000, by Indian Ridge. Won five races.
- Woman in White, grey filly, 2001, by Daylami. Failed to win in five races.
- Dream Tiger, grey colt, 2003, by Afleet. Won two races.
- Queen Nicer, bay filly, 2004, by Forty Niner. Failed to win a race.
- Kindlelight Sun, brown colt (later gelded), 2006, by King Kamehameha. Won one race.
- Jabal Tariq, bay colt, 2008, by Rock of Gibraltar. Failed to win a race.
- Party Queen, grey filly, 2010, by Agnes Tachyon. Failed to win a race.
- Queen's Adaman, grey filly, 2012, by Chichicastenango. Failed to win a race.

== Pedigree ==
Pedigree of Nicer (IRE), grey mare, 1990
Sire Pennine Walk (IRE) 1982	Persian Bold (IRE); 1975	Bold Lad	Bold Ruler
Sire Pennine Walk (IRE) 1982	Persian Bold (IRE); 1975	Bold Lad	Barn Pride
Sire Pennine Walk (IRE) 1982	Persian Bold (IRE); 1975	Relkarunner	Relko
Sire Pennine Walk (IRE) 1982	Persian Bold (IRE); 1975	Relkarunner	Running Blue
Sire Pennine Walk (IRE) 1982	Tifrums (IRE); 1977	Thatch	Forli
Sire Pennine Walk (IRE) 1982	Tifrums (IRE); 1977	Thatch	Thong
Sire Pennine Walk (IRE) 1982	Tifrums (IRE); 1977	Persian Apple	No Robbery
Sire Pennine Walk (IRE) 1982	Tifrums (IRE); 1977	Persian Apple	Persian Garden
Dam Everything Nice (IRE) 1973	Sovereign Path (GB); 1956	Grey Sovereign	Nasrullah
Dam Everything Nice (IRE) 1973	Sovereign Path (GB); 1956	Grey Sovereign	Kong
Dam Everything Nice (IRE) 1973	Sovereign Path (GB); 1956	Mountain Path	Bobsleigh
Dam Everything Nice (IRE) 1973	Sovereign Path (GB); 1956	Mountain Path	Path of Peace
Dam Everything Nice (IRE) 1973	Emma Canute (IRE); 1967	Hardicanute	Hard Ridden
Dam Everything Nice (IRE) 1973	Emma Canute (IRE); 1967	Hardicanute	Harvest Maid
Dam Everything Nice (IRE) 1973	Emma Canute (IRE); 1967	Gneevebawn	The Phoenix
Dam Everything Nice (IRE) 1973	Emma Canute (IRE); 1967	Gneevebawn	Cinnamon (Family 3-e)
