= Johnny Wilson (boxer) =

American boxer (1893–1985)

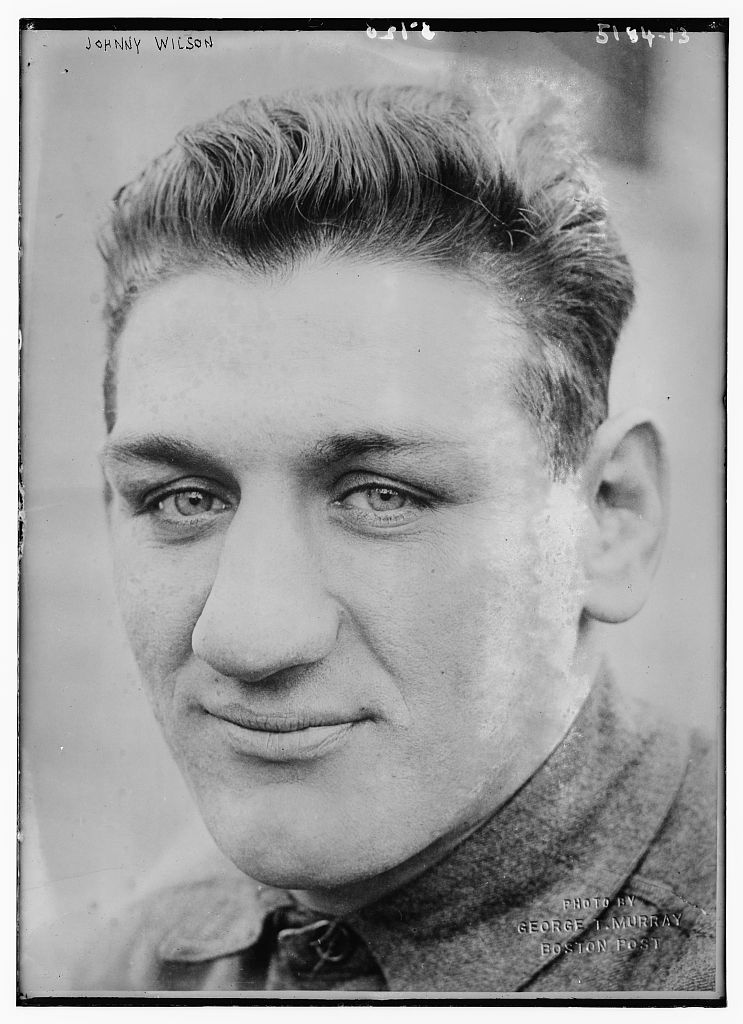

Personal information
- Nationality: American
- Born: Giovanni Francesco Panica; March 23, 1893 New York, New York
- Died: December 8, 1985 (aged 92) Boston, Massachusetts
- Height: 5 ft 9 in (1.75 m)
- Weight: Middleweight

Boxing career
- Reach: 72 in (183 cm)
- Stance: Southpaw

Boxing record
- Total fights: 100
- Wins: 62
- Win by KO: 29
- Losses: 29
- Draws: 8
- No contests: 1

Johnny Wilson was born Giovanni Francesco Panica on March 23, 1893 in Harlem, New York City. He was a professional boxer who fought from 1911 until 1926. The highlight of Wilson's career came when he captured the world middleweight championship by defeating Mike O'Dowd by decision over 12 rounds on May 6, 1920. Wilson held the crown until he was outpointed over 15 rounds by the all-time great Harry Greb.

After retiring from the ring, Wilson was involved in the ownership/management of several successful nightclubs in New York and Boston. Wilson died on December 8, 1985.

== Cameo ==
In 1970 Wilson had a short appearing in Michelangelo Antonioni's Zabriskie Point movie (at 00:42' in Italian edition), when he was 77.

== Professional boxing record ==
All information in this section is derived from BoxRec, unless otherwise stated.

=== Official record ===
100 fights	48 wins	21 losses
By knockout	29	3
By decision	18	14
By disqualification	1	4
Draws	2	
No contests	1	
Newspaper decisions/draws	28	

All newspaper decisions are officially regarded as “no decision” bouts and are not counted in the win/loss/draw column.

No.	Result	Record	Opponent	Type	Round	Date	Location	Notes
100	Loss	48–21–2 (29)	Maxie Rosenbloom	UD	10	Oct 4, 1926	Motor Square Garden, Pittsburgh, Pennsylvania, U.S.	
99	Win	48–20–2 (29)	Chief Halbran	KO	5 (10)	Sep 24, 1926	Armory, Stamford, Connecticut, U.S.	
98	Loss	47–20–2 (29)	Maxie Rosenbloom	PTS	12	Aug 27, 1926	Coney Island Stadium, New York City, New York, U.S.	
97	Win	47–19–2 (29)	Rocky Marion	KO	5 (10)	Jun 10, 1926	Richmond, Virginia, U.S.	
96	Loss	46–19–2 (29)	Harry Greb	PTS	10	Apr 17, 1925	Mechanics Building, Boston, Massachusetts, U.S.	
95	Loss	46–18–2 (29)	Tiger Flowers	TKO	3 (10)	Dec 9, 1924	Madison Square Garden, New York City, New York, U.S.	
94	Loss	46–17–2 (29)	Jock Malone	NWS	10	Sep 17, 1924	Auditorium, Saint Paul, Minnesota, U.S.	
93	Win	46–17–2 (28)	Jock Malone	TKO	6 (10)	Jul 29, 1924	Braves Field, Boston, Massachusetts, U.S.	
92	Loss	45–17–2 (28)	Tommy Loughran	PTS	10	Feb 12, 1924	Mechanics Building, Boston, Massachusetts, U.S.	
91	Win	45–16–2 (28)	Pal Reed	PTS	10	Jan 29, 1924	Mechanics Building, Boston, Massachusetts, U.S.	
90	Loss	44–16–2 (28)	Harry Greb	UD	15	Jan 18, 1924	Madison Square Garden, New York City, New York, U.S.	For NYSAC, NBA, and The Ring middleweight titles
89	Win	44–15–2 (28)	Pat McCarthy	RTD	3 (10)	Dec 18, 1923	Mechanics Building, Boston, Massachusetts, U.S.	
88	Win	43–15–2 (28)	Pal Reed	PTS	10	Nov 16, 1923	Arena, Boston, Massachusetts, U.S.	
87	Win	42–15–2 (28)	George Robinson	PTS	10	Oct 19, 1923	Arena, Boston, Massachusetts, U.S.	
86	Loss	41–15–2 (28)	Harry Greb	UD	15	Aug 31, 1923	Polo Grounds, New York City, New York, U.S.	Lost NYSAC and NBA middleweight titles
85	Win	41–14–2 (28)	Eddie Carter	NWS	8	Jun 22, 1923	Airport, Atlantic City, New Jersey, U.S.	
84	Win	41–14–2 (27)	Al Demaris	KO	4 (8)	Jul 4, 1922	Fair Grounds Arena, Rutland, Vermont, U.S.	
83	Win	40–14–2 (27)	Reuben K.O. Jaffe	TKO	4 (10)	Apr 21, 1922	Feeley Hall, Hazleton, Pennsylvania, U.S.	
82	Draw	39–14–2 (27)	Bryan Downey	NWS	12	Sep 5, 1921	Boyle's Thirty Acres, Jersey City, New Jersey, U.S.	NYSAC and NBA middleweight titles at stake; (via KO only)
81	Win	39–14–2 (26)	Bryan Downey	DQ	7 (12)	Jul 27, 1921	League Park, Cleveland, Ohio, U.S.	Downey hit Wilson while he was down Ohio commission disagreed with the decision & recognized Downey as middleweight champion
80	Win	38–14–2 (26)	George Robinson	PTS	10	Jul 15, 1921	Arena, Boston, Massachusetts, U.S.	
79	Win	37–14–2 (26)	Joe Chip	NWS	10	May 25, 1921	Roller Palace Rink, Detroit, Michigan, U.S.	
78	Win	37–14–2 (25)	Mike O'Dowd	SD	15	Mar 17, 1921	Madison Square Garden, New York City, New York, U.S.	Retained NYSAC and NBA middleweight titles
77	Win	36–14–2 (25)	Navy Rostan	KO	2 (10)	Feb 10, 1921	Kenosha, Wisconsin, U.S.	Retained NYSAC and NBA middleweight titles
76	Win	35–14–2 (25)	Joe Chip	NWS	10	Jan 17, 1921	Motor Square Garden, Pittsburgh, Pennsylvania, U.S.	
75	Loss	35–14–2 (24)	George Robinson	NWS	10	Dec 9, 1920	Mount Royal Arena, Montreal, Quebec, Canada	
74	Win	35–14–2 (23)	Steve Choynski	KO	5 (10)	Aug 2, 1920	Bison Stadium, Buffalo, New York, U.S.	
73	Loss	34–14–2 (23)	Young Fisher	NWS	10	Jul 20, 1920	Arena, Syracuse, New York, U.S.	
72	Win	34–14–2 (22)	Jakob "Soldier" Bartfield	NWS	12	Jul 1, 1920	1st Regiment Armory, Newark, New Jersey, U.S.	NYSAC middleweight title at stake; (via KO only)
71	Win	34–14–2 (21)	Mike O'Dowd	PTS	12	May 6, 1920	Mechanics Building, Boston, Massachusetts, U.S.	Won NYSAC middleweight title
70	Win	33–14–2 (21)	Pal Reed	PTS	12	Apr 7, 1920	Mechanics Building, Boston, Massachusetts, U.S.	
69	Win	32–14–2 (21)	Billy Murray	TKO	2 (12)	Mar 8, 1920	Casino Hall, Lynn, Massachusetts, U.S.	
68	Win	31–14–2 (21)	Jack London	KO	2 (10)	Dec 25, 1919	Webster, Massachusetts, U.S.	
67	Win	30–14–2 (21)	Young Ahearn	KO	1 (10)	Oct 20, 1919	Fenway A.A., Mechanics Building, Boston, Massachusetts, U.S.	
66	Win	29–14–2 (21)	Young Ahearn	KO	6 (10)	Aug 25, 1919	Fenway A.A., Boston, Massachusetts, U.S.	
65	Draw	28–14–2 (21)	Young Ahearn	PTS	12	Jul 19, 1919	O'Sullivan Park, Lawrence, Massachusetts, U.S.	
64	Win	28–14–1 (21)	George Robinson	NWS	12	Jul 3, 1919	Maplewood Park, Bangor, Maine, U.S.	
63	Win	28–14–1 (20)	Young Fisher	PTS	12	May 12, 1919	Fenway A.A., Boston, Massachusetts, U.S.	
62	Win	27–14–1 (20)	Pat McCarthy	PTS	10	May 5, 1919	Fenway A.A., Boston, Massachusetts, U.S.	
61	Win	26–14–1 (20)	Cyclone Scott	KO	3 (10)	May 2, 1919	Brockton, Massachusetts, U.S.	
60	Draw	25–14–1 (20)	Pat McCarthy	PTS	10	Apr 17, 1919	Lawrence, Massachusetts, U.S.	
59	Win	25–14 (20)	Augie Ratner	PTS	12	May 6, 1918	Douglas A.C., Chelsea, Massachusetts, U.S.	
58	Win	24–14 (20)	Leo Houck	PTS	12	Apr 15, 1918	Douglas A.C., Chelsea, Massachusetts, U.S.	
57	Loss	23–14 (20)	Frank Carbone	DQ	1 (12)	Apr 10, 1918	Rollo Rink, Newport, Rhode Island, U.S.	Wilson was disqualified for punching low
56	Loss	23–13 (20)	Leo Houck	PTS	12	Mar 11, 1918	Douglas A.C., Chelsea, Massachusetts, U.S.	
55	Win	23–12 (20)	Pinky Crosby	KO	2 (10)	Mar 5, 1918	Freeman's Hall, Portsmouth, New Hampshire, U.S.	
54	Win	22–12 (20)	Victor Dahl	KO	1 (12)	Jan 28, 1918	Douglas A.C., Chelsea, Massachusetts, U.S.	
53	Win	21–12 (20)	Art Magirl	TKO	3 (12)	Dec 14, 1917	Rollo Rink, Newport, Rhode Island, U.S.	
52	Win	20–12 (20)	Jack Savage	PTS	12	Nov 16, 1917	Camp Devens, Ayer, Massachusetts, U.S.	
51	Win	19–12 (20)	Victor Dahl	PTS	12	Oct 19, 1917	Rollo Rink, Newport, Rhode Island, U.S.	
50	Loss	18–12 (20)	Roddie MacDonald	PTS	15	Jul 28, 1917	Halifax, Nova Scotia, Canada	
49	Win	18–11 (20)	Al Nelson	KO	1 (10)	Apr 27, 1917	Manchester, New Hampshire, U.S.	
48	Win	17–11 (20)	Carl Hertz	PTS	10	Apr 19, 1917	Commercial A.C., Boston, Massachusetts, U.S.	
47	Draw	16–11 (20)	Jack Savage	NWS	10	Apr 13, 1917	Garde d'Honneur Hall, Fitchburg, Massachusetts, U.S.	
46	Loss	16–11 (19)	Joe White	DQ	3 (12)	Mar 21, 1917	North Shore A.C., Beverly, Massachusetts, U.S.	
45	Win	16–10 (19)	Al Nelson	NWS	12	Feb 23, 1917	Bangor, Maine, U.S.	
44	Loss	16–10 (18)	George Robinson	PTS	10	Jan 19, 1917	Commercial A.C., Boston, Massachusetts, U.S.	
43	Win	16–9 (18)	Al Rogers	NWS	12	Dec 25, 1916	Bangor, Maine, U.S.	
42	Win	16–9 (17)	Jack Savage	PTS	12	Dec 15, 1916	Rollo Rink, Newport, Rhode Island, U.S.	
41	Win	15–9 (17)	Roddie MacDonald	PTS	10	Dec 6, 1916	Marieville Gardens, North Providence, Rhode Island, U.S.	
40	Win	14–9 (17)	Battling McFarland	KO	9 (10)	Oct 17, 1916	Halifax, Nova Scotia, Canada	
39	Win	13–9 (17)	Roddie MacDonald	PTS	12	Sep 19, 1916	Halifax, Nova Scotia, Canada	
38	Win	12–9 (17)	Roddie MacDonald	TKO	12 (12)	Aug 10, 1916	Halifax, Nova Scotia, Canada	
37	Win	11–9 (17)	Joe Farren	KO	3 (10)	Jul 28, 1916	Commercial A.C., Boston, Massachusetts, U.S.	
36	Win	10–9 (17)	Frankie Notter	NWS	12	May 30, 1916	20th Century A.C., Pittsfield, Massachusetts, U.S.	
35	Loss	10–9 (16)	Silent Martin	PTS	12	Apr 26, 1916	Rhode Island A.C., Thornton, Rhode Island, U.S.	
34	Win	10–8 (16)	Battling McFarland	KO	9 (12)	Apr 5, 1916	Marieville Gardens, North Providence, Rhode Island, U.S.	
33	Win	9–8 (16)	Jack Donnelly	TKO	8 (10)	Mar 29, 1916	Rhode Island A.C., Providence, Rhode Island, U.S.	
32	Loss	8–8 (16)	Joe White	DQ	4 (10)	Mar 21, 1916	North Shore A.C., Beverly, Massachusetts, U.S.	
31	Loss	8–7 (16)	Tommy Robson	PTS	12	Feb 24, 1916	Unity Cycle Club, Lawrence, Massachusetts, U.S.	
30	Loss	8–6 (16)	Joe White	PTS	10	Feb 22, 1916	Lenox A.C., Gloucester, Massachusetts, U.S.	
29	Loss	8–5 (16)	Bill Fleming	PTS	12	Jan 26, 1916	Rhode Island A.C., Thornton, Rhode Island, U.S.	
28	Win	8–4 (16)	Johnny Mello	KO	3 (8)	Jan 25, 1916	Hippodrome, Boston, Massachusetts, U.S.	
27	Win	7–4 (16)	K.O. Sweeney	PTS	12	Jan 21, 1916	Hibernian Hall, Roxbury, Massachusetts, U.S.	
26	Win	6–4 (16)	Ritchie Jasper	TKO	2 (8)	Jan 11, 1916	Hippodrome, Boston, Massachusetts, U.S.	
25	Loss	5–4 (16)	Battling McFarland	PTS	12	Jun 30, 1915	Providence, Rhode Island, U.S.	
24	Win	5–3 (16)	K.O. Sweeney	NWS	10	May 27, 1915	American A.C., Harlem River Casino, New York City, New York, U.S.	
23	Draw	5–3 (15)	Mike Mazie	NWS	10	May 1, 1915	Irving A.C., New York City, New York, U.S.	
22	Win	5–3 (14)	Young Kid Broad	KO	5 (10)	Apr 17, 1915	Atlantic Garden A.C., New York City, New York, U.S.	
21	Win	4–3 (14)	Billy Bush	NWS	10	Mar 19, 1915	Vanderbilt A.C., New York City, New York, U.S.	
20	Win	4–3 (13)	Chic Nelson	NWS	10	Mar 16, 1915	Brown's Gym, New York City, New York, U.S.	
19	Win	4–3 (12)	Red Tucker	KO	1 (10)	Feb 22, 1915	Olympic A.C., New York City, New York, U.S.	
18	Draw	3–3 (12)	K.O. Sweeney	NWS	10	Jan 9, 1915	Fairmont A.C., New York City, New York, U.S.	
17	Win	3–3 (11)	Frank Carbone	NWS	10	Oct 5, 1914	Olympic A.C., New York City, New York, U.S.	
16	Win	3–3 (10)	Joe Fox	KO	3 (10)	Aug 29, 1914	St. Nicholas Arena, New York City, New York, U.S.	
15	Win	2–3 (10)	Walter McGirr	TKO	4 (10)	Aug 21, 1914	New Polo A.C., New York City, New York, U.S.	
14	Draw	1–3 (10)	Westside Jimmy Duffy	NWS	10	May 27, 1914	Sharkey A.C, New York City, New York, U.S.	
13	Loss	1–3 (9)	Jimmy Fryer	DQ	4 (6)	Apr 11, 1914	National A.C., Philadelphia, Pennsylvania, U.S.	
12	Win	1–2 (9)	Jimmy Fryer	NWS	10	Apr 3, 1914	Empire A.C., New York City, New York, U.S.	
11	Loss	1–2 (8)	Fighting Kennedy	NWS	10	Feb 23, 1914	Olympic A.C., Harlem, New York City, New York, U.S.	
10	Loss	1–2 (7)	Fighting Kennedy	NWS	10	Dec 8, 1913	Olympic A.C., New York City, New York, U.S.	
9	Win	1–2 (6)	Sailor Donaghy	KO	2 (10)	Oct 27, 1913	Queensboro A.C., New York City, New York, U.S.	
8	Draw	0–2 (6)	Young Battling Nelson	NWS	10	Sep 20, 1913	Irving A.C., New York City, New York, U.S.	
7	Loss	0–2 (5)	Young McCartney	NWS	6	Sep 5, 1913	Nonpareil A.C., Philadelphia, Pennsylvania, U.S.	
6	Loss	0–2 (4)	Fighting Kennedy	NWS	10	Aug 16, 1913	Fairmont A.C., New York City, New York, U.S.	
5	Win	0–2 (3)	Young Victor	NWS	6	Feb 4, 1913	Hillside A.C., Belleville, New Jersey, U.S.	
4	Loss	0–2 (2)	Paul Dixon	TKO	5 (10)	Jan 18, 1913	Clermont Avenue Rink, New York City, New York, U.S.	
3	NC	0–1 (2)	Willie Collins	NC	6 (10)	Nov 1, 1912	Culver A.C., Coney Island, New York City, New York, U.S.	
2	Loss	0–1 (1)	Charley Smith	NWS	10	Oct 8, 1912	Washington Park A.C., New York City, New York, U.S.	
1	Loss	0–1	Johnny Alberts	TKO	7 (10)	Oct 5, 1912	National A.C., New York City, New York, U.S.	

=== Unofficial record ===
100 fights	62 wins	29 losses
By knockout	29	3
By decision	32	22
By disqualification	1	4
Draws	8	
No contests	1	

Record with the inclusion of newspaper decisions in the win/loss/draw column.

No.	Result	Record	Opponent	Type	Round	Date	Location	Notes
100	Loss	62–29–8 (1)	Maxie Rosenbloom	UD	10	Oct 4, 1926	Motor Square Garden, Pittsburgh, Pennsylvania, U.S.	
99	Win	62–28–8 (1)	Chief Halbran	KO	5 (10)	Sep 24, 1926	Armory, Stamford, Connecticut, U.S.	
98	Loss	61–28–8 (1)	Maxie Rosenbloom	PTS	12	Aug 27, 1926	Coney Island Stadium, New York City, New York, U.S.	
97	Win	61–27–8 (1)	Rocky Marion	KO	5 (10)	Jun 10, 1926	Richmond, Virginia, U.S.	
96	Loss	60–27–8 (1)	Harry Greb	PTS	10	Apr 17, 1925	Mechanics Building, Boston, Massachusetts, U.S.	
95	Loss	60–26–8 (1)	Tiger Flowers	TKO	3 (10)	Dec 9, 1924	Madison Square Garden, New York City, New York, U.S.	
94	Loss	60–25–8 (1)	Jock Malone	NWS	10	Sep 17, 1924	Auditorium, Saint Paul, Minnesota, U.S.	
93	Win	60–24–8 (1)	Jock Malone	TKO	6 (10)	Jul 29, 1924	Braves Field, Boston, Massachusetts, U.S.	
92	Loss	59–24–8 (1)	Tommy Loughran	PTS	10	Feb 12, 1924	Mechanics Building, Boston, Massachusetts, U.S.	
91	Win	59–23–8 (1)	Pal Reed	PTS	10	Jan 29, 1924	Mechanics Building, Boston, Massachusetts, U.S.	
90	Loss	58–23–8 (1)	Harry Greb	UD	15	Jan 18, 1924	Madison Square Garden, New York City, New York, U.S.	For NYSAC, NBA, and The Ring middleweight titles
89	Win	58–22–8 (1)	Pat McCarthy	RTD	3 (10)	Dec 18, 1923	Mechanics Building, Boston, Massachusetts, U.S.	
88	Win	57–22–8 (1)	Pal Reed	PTS	10	Nov 16, 1923	Arena, Boston, Massachusetts, U.S.	
87	Win	56–22–8 (1)	George Robinson	PTS	10	Oct 19, 1923	Arena, Boston, Massachusetts, U.S.	
86	Loss	55–22–8 (1)	Harry Greb	UD	15	Aug 31, 1923	Polo Grounds, New York City, New York, U.S.	Lost NYSAC and NBA middleweight titles
85	Win	55–21–8 (1)	Eddie Carter	NWS	8	Jun 22, 1923	Airport, Atlantic City, New Jersey, U.S.	
84	Win	54–21–8 (1)	Al Demaris	KO	4 (8)	Jul 4, 1922	Fair Grounds Arena, Rutland, Vermont, U.S.	
83	Win	53–21–8 (1)	Reuben K.O. Jaffe	TKO	4 (10)	Apr 21, 1922	Feeley Hall, Hazleton, Pennsylvania, U.S.	
82	Draw	52–21–8 (1)	Bryan Downey	NWS	12	Sep 5, 1921	Boyle's Thirty Acres, Jersey City, New Jersey, U.S.	NYSAC and NBA middleweight titles at stake; (via KO only)
81	Win	52–21–7 (1)	Bryan Downey	DQ	7 (12)	Jul 27, 1921	League Park, Cleveland, Ohio, U.S.	Downey hit Wilson while he was down Ohio commission disagreed with the decision & recognized Downey as middleweight champion
80	Win	51–21–7 (1)	George Robinson	PTS	10	Jul 15, 1921	Arena, Boston, Massachusetts, U.S.	
79	Win	50–21–7 (1)	Joe Chip	NWS	10	May 25, 1921	Roller Palace Rink, Detroit, Michigan, U.S.	
78	Win	49–21–7 (1)	Mike O'Dowd	SD	15	Mar 17, 1921	Madison Square Garden, New York City, New York, U.S.	Retained NYSAC and NBA middleweight titles
77	Win	48–21–7 (1)	Navy Rostan	KO	2 (10)	Feb 10, 1921	Kenosha, Wisconsin, U.S.	Retained NYSAC and NBA middleweight titles
76	Win	47–21–7 (1)	Joe Chip	NWS	10	Jan 17, 1921	Motor Square Garden, Pittsburgh, Pennsylvania, U.S.	
75	Loss	46–21–7 (1)	George Robinson	NWS	10	Dec 9, 1920	Mount Royal Arena, Montreal, Quebec, Canada	
74	Win	46–20–7 (1)	Steve Choynski	KO	5 (10)	Aug 2, 1920	Bison Stadium, Buffalo, New York, U.S.	
73	Loss	45–20–7 (1)	Young Fisher	NWS	10	Jul 20, 1920	Arena, Syracuse, New York, U.S.	
72	Win	45–19–7 (1)	Jakob "Soldier" Bartfield	NWS	12	Jul 1, 1920	1st Regiment Armory, Newark, New Jersey, U.S.	NYSAC middleweight title at stake; (via KO only)
71	Win	44–19–7 (1)	Mike O'Dowd	PTS	12	May 6, 1920	Mechanics Building, Boston, Massachusetts, U.S.	Won NYSAC middleweight title
70	Win	43–19–7 (1)	Pal Reed	PTS	12	Apr 7, 1920	Mechanics Building, Boston, Massachusetts, U.S.	
69	Win	42–19–7 (1)	Billy Murray	TKO	2 (12)	Mar 8, 1920	Casino Hall, Lynn, Massachusetts, U.S.	
68	Win	41–19–7 (1)	Jack London	KO	2 (10)	Dec 25, 1919	Webster, Massachusetts, U.S.	
67	Win	40–19–7 (1)	Young Ahearn	KO	1 (10)	Oct 20, 1919	Fenway A.A., Mechanics Building, Boston, Massachusetts, U.S.	
66	Win	39–19–7 (1)	Young Ahearn	KO	6 (10)	Aug 25, 1919	Fenway A.A., Boston, Massachusetts, U.S.	
65	Draw	38–19–7 (1)	Young Ahearn	PTS	12	Jul 19, 1919	O'Sullivan Park, Lawrence, Massachusetts, U.S.	
64	Win	38–19–6 (1)	George Robinson	NWS	12	Jul 3, 1919	Maplewood Park, Bangor, Maine, U.S.	
63	Win	37–19–6 (1)	Young Fisher	PTS	12	May 12, 1919	Fenway A.A., Boston, Massachusetts, U.S.	
62	Win	36–19–6 (1)	Pat McCarthy	PTS	10	May 5, 1919	Fenway A.A., Boston, Massachusetts, U.S.	
61	Win	35–19–6 (1)	Cyclone Scott	KO	3 (10)	May 2, 1919	Brockton, Massachusetts, U.S.	
60	Draw	34–19–6 (1)	Pat McCarthy	PTS	10	Apr 17, 1919	Lawrence, Massachusetts, U.S.	
59	Win	34–19–5 (1)	Augie Ratner	PTS	12	May 6, 1918	Douglas A.C., Chelsea, Massachusetts, U.S.	
58	Win	33–19–5 (1)	Leo Houck	PTS	12	Apr 15, 1918	Douglas A.C., Chelsea, Massachusetts, U.S.	
57	Loss	32–19–5 (1)	Frank Carbone	DQ	1 (12)	Apr 10, 1918	Rollo Rink, Newport, Rhode Island, U.S.	Wilson was disqualified for punching low
56	Loss	32–18–5 (1)	Leo Houck	PTS	12	Mar 11, 1918	Douglas A.C., Chelsea, Massachusetts, U.S.	
55	Win	32–17–5 (1)	Pinky Crosby	KO	2 (10)	Mar 5, 1918	Freeman's Hall, Portsmouth, New Hampshire, U.S.	
54	Win	31–17–5 (1)	Victor Dahl	KO	1 (12)	Jan 28, 1918	Douglas A.C., Chelsea, Massachusetts, U.S.	
53	Win	30–17–5 (1)	Art Magirl	TKO	3 (12)	Dec 14, 1917	Rollo Rink, Newport, Rhode Island, U.S.	
52	Win	29–17–5 (1)	Jack Savage	PTS	12	Nov 16, 1917	Camp Devens, Ayer, Massachusetts, U.S.	
51	Win	28–17–5 (1)	Victor Dahl	PTS	12	Oct 19, 1917	Rollo Rink, Newport, Rhode Island, U.S.	
50	Loss	27–17–5 (1)	Roddie MacDonald	PTS	15	Jul 28, 1917	Halifax, Nova Scotia, Canada	
49	Win	27–16–5 (1)	Al Nelson	KO	1 (10)	Apr 27, 1917	Manchester, New Hampshire, U.S.	
48	Win	26–16–5 (1)	Carl Hertz	PTS	10	Apr 19, 1917	Commercial A.C., Boston, Massachusetts, U.S.	
47	Draw	25–16–5 (1)	Jack Savage	NWS	10	Apr 13, 1917	Garde d'Honneur Hall, Fitchburg, Massachusetts, U.S.	
46	Loss	25–16–4 (1)	Joe White	DQ	3 (12)	Mar 21, 1917	North Shore A.C., Beverly, Massachusetts, U.S.	
45	Win	25–15–4 (1)	Al Nelson	NWS	12	Feb 23, 1917	Bangor, Maine, U.S.	
44	Loss	24–15–4 (1)	George Robinson	PTS	10	Jan 19, 1917	Commercial A.C., Boston, Massachusetts, U.S.	
43	Win	24–14–4 (1)	Al Rogers	NWS	12	Dec 25, 1916	Bangor, Maine, U.S.	
42	Win	23–14–4 (1)	Jack Savage	PTS	12	Dec 15, 1916	Rollo Rink, Newport, Rhode Island, U.S.	
41	Win	22–14–4 (1)	Roddie MacDonald	PTS	10	Dec 6, 1916	Marieville Gardens, North Providence, Rhode Island, U.S.	
40	Win	21–14–4 (1)	Battling McFarland	KO	9 (10)	Oct 17, 1916	Halifax, Nova Scotia, Canada	
39	Win	20–14–4 (1)	Roddie MacDonald	PTS	12	Sep 19, 1916	Halifax, Nova Scotia, Canada	
38	Win	19–14–4 (1)	Roddie MacDonald	TKO	12 (12)	Aug 10, 1916	Halifax, Nova Scotia, Canada	
37	Win	18–14–4 (1)	Joe Farren	KO	3 (10)	Jul 28, 1916	Commercial A.C., Boston, Massachusetts, U.S.	
36	Win	17–14–4 (1)	Frankie Notter	NWS	12	May 30, 1916	20th Century A.C., Pittsfield, Massachusetts, U.S.	
35	Loss	16–14–4 (1)	Silent Martin	PTS	12	Apr 26, 1916	Rhode Island A.C., Thornton, Rhode Island, U.S.	
34	Win	16–13–4 (1)	Battling McFarland	KO	9 (12)	Apr 5, 1916	Marieville Gardens, North Providence, Rhode Island, U.S.	
33	Win	15–13–4 (1)	Jack Donnelly	TKO	8 (10)	Mar 29, 1916	Rhode Island A.C., Providence, Rhode Island, U.S.	
32	Loss	14–13–4 (1)	Joe White	DQ	4 (10)	Mar 21, 1916	North Shore A.C., Beverly, Massachusetts, U.S.	
31	Loss	14–12–4 (1)	Tommy Robson	PTS	12	Feb 24, 1916	Unity Cycle Club, Lawrence, Massachusetts, U.S.	
30	Loss	14–11–4 (1)	Joe White	PTS	10	Feb 22, 1916	Lenox A.C., Gloucester, Massachusetts, U.S.	
29	Loss	14–10–4 (1)	Bill Fleming	PTS	12	Jan 26, 1916	Rhode Island A.C., Thornton, Rhode Island, U.S.	
28	Win	14–9–4 (1)	Johnny Mello	KO	3 (8)	Jan 25, 1916	Hippodrome, Boston, Massachusetts, U.S.	
27	Win	13–9–4 (1)	K.O. Sweeney	PTS	12	Jan 21, 1916	Hibernian Hall, Roxbury, Massachusetts, U.S.	
26	Win	12–9–4 (1)	Ritchie Jasper	TKO	2 (8)	Jan 11, 1916	Hippodrome, Boston, Massachusetts, U.S.	
25	Loss	11–9–4 (1)	Battling McFarland	PTS	12	Jun 30, 1915	Providence, Rhode Island, U.S.	
24	Win	11–8–4 (1)	K.O. Sweeney	NWS	10	May 27, 1915	American A.C., Harlem River Casino, New York City, New York, U.S.	
23	Draw	10–8–4 (1)	Mike Mazie	NWS	10	May 1, 1915	Irving A.C., New York City, New York, U.S.	
22	Win	10–8–3 (1)	Young Kid Broad	KO	5 (10)	Apr 17, 1915	Atlantic Garden A.C., New York City, New York, U.S.	
21	Win	9–8–3 (1)	Billy Bush	NWS	10	Mar 19, 1915	Vanderbilt A.C., New York City, New York, U.S.	
20	Win	8–8–3 (1)	Chic Nelson	NWS	10	Mar 16, 1915	Brown's Gym, New York City, New York, U.S.	
19	Win	7–8–3 (1)	Red Tucker	KO	1 (10)	Feb 22, 1915	Olympic A.C., New York City, New York, U.S.	
18	Draw	6–8–3 (1)	K.O. Sweeney	NWS	10	Jan 9, 1915	Fairmont A.C., New York City, New York, U.S.	
17	Win	6–8–2 (1)	Frank Carbone	NWS	10	Oct 5, 1914	Olympic A.C., New York City, New York, U.S.	
16	Win	5–8–2 (1)	Joe Fox	KO	3 (10)	Aug 29, 1914	St. Nicholas Arena, New York City, New York, U.S.	
15	Win	4–8–2 (1)	Walter McGirr	TKO	4 (10)	Aug 21, 1914	New Polo A.C., New York City, New York, U.S.	
14	Draw	3–8–2 (1)	Westside Jimmy Duffy	NWS	10	May 27, 1914	Sharkey A.C, New York City, New York, U.S.	
13	Loss	3–8–1 (1)	Jimmy Fryer	DQ	4 (6)	Apr 11, 1914	National A.C., Philadelphia, Pennsylvania, U.S.	
12	Win	3–7–1 (1)	Jimmy Fryer	NWS	10	Apr 3, 1914	Empire A.C., New York City, New York, U.S.	
11	Loss	2–7–1 (1)	Fighting Kennedy	NWS	10	Feb 23, 1914	Olympic A.C., Harlem, New York City, New York, U.S.	
10	Loss	2–6–1 (1)	Fighting Kennedy	NWS	10	Dec 8, 1913	Olympic A.C., New York City, New York, U.S.	
9	Win	2–5–1 (1)	Sailor Donaghy	KO	2 (10)	Oct 27, 1913	Queensboro A.C., New York City, New York, U.S.	
8	Draw	1–5–1 (1)	Young Battling Nelson	NWS	10	Sep 20, 1913	Irving A.C., New York City, New York, U.S.	
7	Loss	1–5 (1)	Young McCartney	NWS	6	Sep 5, 1913	Nonpareil A.C., Philadelphia, Pennsylvania, U.S.	
6	Loss	1–4 (1)	Fighting Kennedy	NWS	10	Aug 16, 1913	Fairmont A.C., New York City, New York, U.S.	
5	Win	1–3 (1)	Young Victor	NWS	6	Feb 4, 1913	Hillside A.C., Belleville, New Jersey, U.S.	
4	Loss	0–3 (1)	Paul Dixon	TKO	5 (10)	Jan 18, 1913	Clermont Avenue Rink, New York City, New York, U.S.	
3	NC	0–2 (1)	Willie Collins	NC	6 (10)	Nov 1, 1912	Culver A.C., Coney Island, New York City, New York, U.S.	
2	Loss	0–2	Charley Smith	NWS	10	Oct 8, 1912	Washington Park A.C., New York City, New York, U.S.	
1	Loss	0–1	Johnny Alberts	TKO	7 (10)	Oct 5, 1912	National A.C., New York City, New York, U.S.	

== Titles in boxing ==
=== Major world titles ===
- NYSAC middleweight champion (160 lbs) (2×) (Note: Stripped of the NYSAC title on June 21, 1922; Reinstated on April 12, 1923.)
- NBA (WBA) middleweight champion (Note: Awarded the inaugural title on January 1921.) (160 lbs)

=== Undisputed titles ===
- Undisputed middleweight champion (Note: The first undisputed middleweight champion.)(2×)

== See also ==
- List of middleweight boxing champions

== Notes and references ==
=== References ===
Achievements
Preceded by Mike O'Dowd	World Middleweight Champion; May 6, 1920 – August 31, 1923	Succeeded by Harry Greb
Sporting positions
Preceded by Jimmy Reagan	Oldest living world champion October 1, 1975 – December 8, 1985	Succeeded by Jack Sharkey
