= Mike O'Dowd =

American boxer

Personal information
- Nickname: The St. Paul Cyclone
- Nationality: American
- Born: Michael Joseph O'Dowd; April 5, 1895 St. Paul, Minnesota
- Died: July 28, 1957 (aged 62)
- Height: 5 ft 8 in (1.73 m)
- Weight: Middleweight

Boxing career
- Reach: 70 in (178 cm)

Boxing record
- Total fights: 117; with the inclusion of newspaper decisions
- Wins: 93
- Win by KO: 39
- Losses: 16
- Draws: 7
- No contests: 1

Michael Joseph O'Dowd (April 5, 1895, in St. Paul, Minnesota – July 28, 1957) was an American boxer who held the World Middleweight Championship from 1917 to 1920.

== Biography ==
O'Dowd won the title on November 14, 1917, by knocking out Al McCoy in the sixth round after dropping him six times. O'Dowd was the only active boxing champion to fight at the front during World War I (1918, while serving in the U.S. Army). During his career he claimed victories over Hall of Famers Jack Britton, Mike Gibbons, Kid Lewis and Jeff Smith. On February 25, 1918, he held the legendary Harry Greb to a draw. O'Dowd was knocked out just once in his career, his last fight on March 16, 1923.

O'Dowd died on July 28, 1957, from a heart attack at a Veteran's hospital, aged 62. He was buried at Calvary Cemetery. He was inducted into the Minnesota Boxing Hall of Fame in 2011 and the International Boxing Hall of Fame in 2014.

== Professional boxing record ==
All information in this section is derived from BoxRec, unless otherwise stated.

=== Official record ===
| 117 fights | 52 wins | 7 losses |
|---|---|---|
| By knockout | 40 | 1 |
| By decision | 11 | 6 |
| By disqualification | 1 | 0 |
| Draws | 3 | |
| No contests | 1 | |
| Newspaper decisions/draws | 54 | |

All newspaper decisions are officially regarded as "no decision" bouts and are not counted in the win/loss/draw column.

| No. | Result | Record | Opponent | Type | Round | Date | Age | Location | Notes |
|---|---|---|---|---|---|---|---|---|---|
| 117 | Loss | 52–7–3 (55) | Jock Malone | KO | 1 (10) | Mar 16, 1923 | 28 years, 265 days | Auditorium, Saint Paul, Minnesota, U.S. | Lost NYSAC middleweight title; For world middleweight title (Ohio version) |
| 116 | Win | 52–6–3 (55) | Dave Rosenberg | DQ | 8 (12) | Nov 30, 1922 | 27 years, 265 days | Clermont Avenue Rink, New York City, New York, U.S. | Won NYSAC middleweight title |
| 115 | Loss | 51–6–3 (55) | Brian Downey | PTS | 12 | May 15, 1922 | 27 years, 66 days | Fairmont Arena, Columbus, Ohio, U.S. | For world middleweight title (Ohio version) |
| 114 | Win | 51–5–3 (55) | Mike Gibbons | PTS | 12 | May 6, 1922 | 27 years, 57 days | Queensboro Stadium, New York City, New York, U.S. | |
| 113 | Win | 50–5–3 (55) | Jakob "Soldier" Bartfield | PTS | 12 | Mar 18, 1922 | 27 years, 8 days | Clermont Avenue Rink, New York City, New York, U.S. | |
| 112 | Loss | 49–5–3 (55) | Mike Gibbons | NWS | 10 | Dec 16, 1921 | 26 years, 281 days | Auditorium, Saint Paul, Minnesota, U.S. | |
| 111 | Draw | 49–5–3 (54) | Lou Bogash | PTS | 12 | Dec 6, 1921 | 26 years, 271 days | Pioneer Sporting Club, New York City, New York, U.S. | |
| 110 | Win | 49–5–2 (54) | Johnny Paske | PTS | 12 | Nov 14, 1921 | 26 years, 218 days | Broadway Auditorium, Buffalo, New York, U.S. | |
| 109 | Loss | 48–5–2 (54) | Phil Krug | NWS | 12 | Sep 1, 1921 | 26 years, 175 days | Broad A.C., Newark, New Jersey, U.S. | |
| 108 | Loss | 48–5–2 (53) | Young Fisher | PTS | 12 | Aug 26, 1921 | 26 years, 169 days | Arena, Syracuse, New York City, New York, U.S. | |
| 107 | Win | 48–4–2 (53) | Silent Martin | TKO | 9 (12) | Aug 20, 1921 | 26 years, 163 days | Queensboro Stadium, New York City, New York, U.S. | |
| 106 | Loss | 47–4–2 (53) | Johnny Wilson | SD | 15 | Mar 17, 1921 | 26 years, 7 days | Madison Square Garden, New York City, New York, U.S. | For NYSAC and NBA middleweight titles |
| 105 | Win | 47–3–2 (53) | Len Rowlands | NWS | 8 | Dec 6, 1920 | 25 years, 271 days | Olympia A.C., Philadelphia, Pennsylvania, U.S. | |
| 104 | Win | 47–3–2 (52) | Jeff Smith | SD | 15 | Nov 9, 1920 | 25 years, 244 days | Madison Square Garden, New York City, New York, U.S. | |
| 103 | Win | 46–3–2 (52) | Frank Carbone | NWS | 10 | Oct 22, 1920 | 25 years, 226 days | Sportsman's Club, Camden, New Jersey, U.S. | |
| 102 | Win | 46–3–2 (51) | Frank Carbone | PTS | 12 | Oct 4, 1920 | 25 years, 208 days | Casino Hall, Bridgeport, Connecticut, U.S. | |
| 101 | Win | 45–3–2 (51) | Ted "Kid" Lewis | NWS | 12 | Sep 23, 1920 | 25 years, 197 days | Westside Ballpark, Jersey City, New Jersey, U.S. | |
| 100 | Win | 45–3–2 (50) | Sailor Ed Petroskey | NWS | 8 | Sep 15, 1920 | 25 years, 189 days | Ice Palace, Philadelphia, Pennsylvania, U.S. | |
| 99 | Win | 45–3–2 (49) | Tommy Robson | PTS | 12 | Aug 21, 1920 | 25 years, 164 days | Cuddy's Arena, Lawrence, Massachusetts, U.S. | |
| 98 | Win | 44–3–2 (49) | Gordon McKay | TKO | 12 (15) | Jul 5, 1920 | 25 years, 117 days | Brady Park, Pocatello, Idaho, U.S. | |
| 97 | Draw | 43–3–2 (49) | Battling Ortega | PTS | 10 | Jun 24, 1920 | 25 years, 106 days | Arena, Milwaukie, Oregon, U.S. | |
| 96 | Win | 43–3–1 (49) | George K.O. Brown | KO | 6 (8) | May 19, 1920 | 25 years, 70 days | Ice Palace, Philadelphia, Pennsylvania, U.S. | |
| 95 | Win | 42–3–1 (49) | Jack Britton | NWS | 12 | May 17, 1920 | 25 years, 68 days | Canton Auditorium, Canton, Ohio, U.S. | |
| 94 | Win | 42–3–1 (48) | Jackie Clark | NWS | 10 | May 11, 1920 | 25 years, 62 days | Sportsman's Club, Camden, New Jersey, U.S. | |
| 93 | Loss | 42–3–1 (47) | Johnny Wilson | PTS | 12 | May 6, 1920 | 25 years, 57 days | Mechanics Building, Boston, Massachusetts, U.S. | Lost NYSAC middleweight title |
| 92 | Win | 42–2–1 (47) | K.O. Samson | TKO | 4 (6) | Apr 26, 1920 | 25 years, 47 days | Olympia A.C., Philadelphia, Pennsylvania, U.S. | |
| 91 | Win | 41–2–1 (47) | Walter Laurette | TKO | 6 (12) | Apr 15, 1920 | 25 years, 36 days | Casino Hall, Bridgeport, Connecticut, U.S. | |
| 90 | Win | 40–2–1 (47) | Frankie Maguire | NWS | 6 | Apr 3, 1920 | 25 years, 24 days | National A.C., Philadelphia, Pennsylvania, U.S. | |
| 89 | Win | 40–2–1 (46) | Joe Eagan | KO | 5 (12) | Mar 30, 1920 | 25 years, 20 days | Mechanics Building, Boston, Massachusetts, U.S. | |
| 88 | Win | 39–2–1 (46) | Augie Ratner | NWS | 10 | Mar 17, 1920 | 25 years, 7 days | Auditorium, Saint Paul, Minnesota, U.S. | World middleweight title at stake; (via KO only) |
| 87 | Win | 39–2–1 (45) | Tommy Madden | KO | 4 (12) | Mar 12, 1920 | 25 years, 2 days | Stockyards Stadium, Denver, Colorado, U.S. | |
| 86 | Win | 38–2–1 (45) | Stockyards Tommy Murphy | TKO | 9 (10) | Mar 5, 1920 | 24 years, 361 days | Auditorium, Atlanta, Georgia, U.S. | |
| 85 | Win | 37–2–1 (45) | Jack McCarron | TKO | 2 (6) | Mar 1, 1920 | 24 years, 357 days | Olympia A.C., Philadelphia, Pennsylvania, U.S. | |
| 84 | Win | 36–2–1 (45) | Young Fisher | KO | 3 (10) | Jan 26, 1920 | 24 years, 322 days | Grand Opera House, Syracuse, New York, U.S. | |
| 83 | Win | 35–2–1 (45) | Stockyards Tommy Murphy | TKO | 3 (12) | Jan 20, 1920 | 24 years, 316 days | Mechanics Building, Boston, Massachusetts, U.S. | |
| 82 | Win | 34–2–1 (45) | Frank Carbone | NWS | 10 | Jan 14, 1920 | 24 years, 310 days | Auditorium, Saint Paul, Minnesota, U.S. | |
| 81 | Win | 34–2–1 (44) | Mike Gibbons | NWS | 10 | Nov 21, 1919 | 24 years, 256 days | Auditorium, Saint Paul, Minnesota, U.S. | World middleweight title at stake; (via KO only) |
| 80 | Win | 34–2–1 (43) | Jimmy O'Hagan | KO | 2 (10) | Nov 10, 1919 | 24 years, 245 days | Roller Palace Rink, Detroit, New Jersey, U.S. | Retained world middleweight title |
| 79 | Win | 33–2–1 (43) | Billy Kramer | KO | 2 (8) | Nov 6, 1919 | 24 years, 241 days | Lyceum Theater, Paterson, New Jersey, U.S. | Retained world middleweight title |
| 78 | Win | 32–2–1 (43) | Jack Connors | KO | 2 (12) | Oct 30, 1919 | 24 years, 234 days | Marieville Gardens, North Providence, Rhode Island, U.S. | |
| 77 | Win | 31–2–1 (43) | Steve Latzo | NWS | 6 | Oct 18, 1919 | 24 years, 222 days | National A.C., Philadelphia, Pennsylvania, U.S. | |
| 76 | Win | 31–2–1 (42) | Augie Ratner | NWS | 8 | Sep 29, 1919 | 24 years, 203 days | Open-Air Arena, Jersey City, New Jersey, U.S. | |
| 75 | Win | 31–2–1 (41) | Jakob "Soldier" Bartfield | NWS | 10 | Sep 19, 1919 | 24 years, 193 days | Auditorium, Saint Paul, Minnesota, U.S. | World middleweight title at stake; (via KO only) |
| 74 | Win | 31–2–1 (40) | Ted "Kid" Lewis | NWS | 10 | Sep 1, 1919 | 24 years, 175 days | 1st Regiment Armory, Newark, New Jersey, U.S. | World middleweight title at stake; (via KO only) |
| 73 | Loss | 31–2–1 (39) | Jack Britton | NWS | 8 | Aug 22, 1919 | 24 years, 165 days | 1st Regiment Armory, Newark, New Jersey, U.S. | |
| 72 | Win | 31–2–1 (38) | Jackie Clark | NWS | 10 | Aug 11, 1919 | 24 years, 154 days | Arena, Syracuse, New York, U.S. | World middleweight title at stake; (via KO only) |
| 71 | Win | 31–2–1 (37) | Young Fisher | KO | 5 (10) | Jul 21, 1919 | 24 years, 133 days | Arena, Syracuse, New York, U.S. | |
| 70 | Win | 30–2–1 (37) | Al McCoy | KO | 3 (10) | Jul 17, 1919 | 24 years, 129 days | Lexington Park, Saint Paul, Minnesota, U.S. | |
| 69 | Draw | 29–2–1 (37) | Harry Greb | NWS | 10 | Feb 25, 1918 | 22 years, 352 days | Auditorium, Saint Paul, Minnesota, U.S. | World middleweight title at stake; (via KO only) |
| 68 | Win | 29–2–1 (36) | Joe Welsh | NWS | 6 | Dec 19, 1917 | 22 years, 284 days | National A.C., Philadelphia, Pennsylvania, U.S. | |
| 67 | Win | 29–2–1 (35) | Billy Kramer | NWS | 6 | Dec 15, 1917 | 22 years, 280 days | National A.C., Philadelphia, Pennsylvania, U.S. | World middleweight title at stake; (via KO only) |
| 66 | Win | 29–2–1 (34) | Jack McCarron | NWS | 6 | Nov 24, 1917 | 22 years, 259 days | National A.C., Philadelphia, Pennsylvania, U.S. | |
| 65 | Win | 29–2–1 (33) | Al McCoy | KO | 6 (10) | Nov 14, 1917 | 22 years, 249 days | Clermont Avenue Rink, New York City, New York, U.S. | Won NYSAC middleweight title |
| 64 | Win | 28–2–1 (33) | Frank Carbone | NWS | 10 | Nov 1, 1917 | 22 years, 236 days | Clermont Avenue Rink, New York City, New York, U.S. | |
| 63 | Win | 28–2–1 (32) | Jerry Cole | TKO | 3 (10) | Oct 27, 1917 | 22 years, 231 days | Broadway Arena, New York City, New York, U.S. | |
| 62 | Win | 27–2–1 (32) | K.O. Willie Loughlin | KO | 2 (10) | Oct 4, 1917 | 22 years, 208 days | Clermont Avenue Rink, New York City, New York, U.S. | |
| 61 | Win | 26–2–1 (32) | Joe Connolly | TKO | 4 (12) | Sep 25, 1917 | 22 years, 199 days | Arena, Boston, Massachusetts, U.S. | |
| 60 | Win | 25–2–1 (32) | Italian Joe Gans | NWS | 10 | Sep 6, 1917 | 22 years, 180 days | Clermont Avenue Rink, Massachusetts, U.S. | |
| 59 | Win | 25–2–1 (31) | Ted "Kid" Lewis | PTS | 12 | Aug 28, 1917 | 22 years, 171 days | Arena, Boston, Massachusetts, U.S. | |
| 58 | Loss | 24–2–1 (31) | Ted "Kid" Lewis | NWS | 10 | Aug 17, 1917 | 22 years, 160 days | St. Nicholas Arena, New York City, New York, U.S. | |
| 57 | Win | 24–2–1 (30) | Frank Carbone | NWS | 10 | Aug 11, 1917 | 22 years, 154 days | Broadway S.C., New York City, New York, U.S. | |
| 56 | Win | 24–2–1 (29) | Tommy Madden | KO | 3 (10) | Aug 9, 1917 | 22 years, 152 days | Clermont Avenue Rink, New York City, New York, U.S. | |
| 55 | Win | 23–2–1 (29) | Jakob "Soldier" Bartfield | NWS | 10 | Jun 28, 1917 | 22 years, 110 days | Clermont Avenue Rink, New York City, New York, U.S. | |
| 54 | Loss | 23–2–1 (28) | Zulu Kid | NWS | 10 | Jun 16, 1917 | 22 years, 98 days | Clermont Avenue Rink, New York City, New York, U.S. | |
| 53 | Loss | 23–2–1 (27) | Ted "Kid" Lewis | NWS | 10 | May 24, 1917 | 22 years, 75 days | St. Nicholas Arena, New York City, New York, U.S. | |
| 52 | Win | 23–2–1 (26) | Silent Martin | NWS | 10 | May 22, 1917 | 22 years, 73 days | Broadway S.C., New York City, New York, U.S. | |
| 51 | Win | 23–2–1 (25) | Italian Joe Gans | NWS | 10 | May 17, 1917 | 22 years, 68 days | Clermont Avenue Rink, New York City, New York, U.S. | |
| 50 | Win | 23–2–1 (24) | Jack Britton | NWS | 10 | May 8, 1917 | 22 years, 59 days | Broadway S.C., New York City, New York, U.S. | |
| 49 | Win | 23–2–1 (23) | Silent Martin | PTS | 15 | May 4, 1917 | 22 years, 55 days | Marieville Gardens, North Providence, Rhode Island, U.S. | |
| 48 | Win | 22–2–1 (23) | Frank Carbone | PTS | 12 | Apr 17, 1917 | 22 years, 38 days | Grand Opera House, Boston, Massachusetts, U.S. | |
| 47 | Win | 21–2–1 (23) | Jakob "Soldier" Bartfield | NWS | 10 | Apr 12, 1917 | 22 years, 33 days | Clermont Avenue Rink, New York City, New York, U.S. | |
| 46 | Win | 21–2–1 (22) | Frank Carbone | NWS | 10 | Mar 31, 1917 | 22 years, 21 days | Clermont Avenue Rink, New York City, New York, U.S. | |
| 45 | Loss | 21–2–1 (21) | Joe Eagan | PTS | 12 | Mar 20, 1917 | 22 years, 10 days | Grand Opera House, Boston, Massachusetts, U.S. | |
| 44 | Loss | 21–1–1 (21) | Jack Britton | NWS | 10 | Jan 25, 1917 | 21 years, 321 days | Auditorium, Saint Paul, Minnesota, U.S. | |
| 43 | Win | 21–1–1 (20) | Frank Carbone | PTS | 15 | Jan 3, 1917 | 21 years, 299 days | Marieville Gardens, North Providence, Rhode Island, U.S. | |
| 42 | Win | 20–1–1 (20) | Johnny 'Kid' Alberts | NWS | 10 | Jan 1, 1917 | 21 years, 297 days | Clermont Avenue Rink, New York City, New York, U.S. | |
| 41 | Win | 20–1–1 (19) | Jack Toland | TKO | 2 (12) | Dec 20, 1916 | 21 years, 285 days | National A.C., Providence, Rhode Island, U.S. | |
| 40 | Win | 19–1–1 (19) | Eddie Moha | NWS | 10 | Nov 30, 1916 | 21 years, 265 days | Eau Claire, Wisconsin, U.S. | |
| 39 | Win | 19–1–1 (18) | Frank Carbone | PTS | 15 | Nov 15, 1916 | 21 years, 250 days | Marieville Gardens, North Providence, Rhode Island, U.S. | |
| 38 | Win | 18–1–1 (18) | Frank Barrieau | KO | 6 (15) | Oct 23, 1916 | 21 years, 227 days | National A.C., Denver, Colorado, U.S. | |
| 37 | Win | 17–1–1 (18) | Mickey Sheridan | NWS | 10 | Aug 18, 1916 | 21 years, 161 days | Auditorium, Saint Paul, Minnesota, U.S. | |
| 36 | Win | 17–1–1 (17) | Willie Adams | KO | 4 (10) | Jun 14, 1916 | 21 years, 96 days | Clermont Avenue Rink, New York City, New York, U.S. | |
| 35 | Loss | 16–1–1 (17) | Jack Britton | PTS | 12 | Jun 6, 1916 | 21 years, 88 days | Arena, Boston, Massachusetts, U.S. | |
| 34 | Win | 16–0–1 (17) | Joe Eagan | TKO | 9 (12) | Apr 25, 1916 | 21 years, 46 days | Arena (Armory A.A.), Boston, Massachusetts, U.S. | |
| 33 | Win | 15–0–1 (17) | Jack Toland | NWS | 10 | Apr 6, 1916 | 21 years, 27 days | Clermont Avenue Rink, New York City, New York, U.S. | |
| 32 | Win | 15–0–1 (16) | Terry Mitchell | TKO | 8 (10) | Mar 25, 1916 | 21 years, 15 days | Clermont Avenue Rink, New York City, New York, U.S. | |
| 31 | Win | 14–0–1 (16) | Young Erne | NWS | 6 | Mar 18, 1916 | 21 years, 8 days | National A.C., Philadelphia, Pennsylvania, U.S. | |
| 30 | Draw | 14–0–1 (15) | Willie Schaeffer | PTS | 10 | Mar 13, 1916 | 21 years, 3 days | Academy of Music, Kansas City, Missouri, U.S. | |
| 29 | Draw | 14–0 (15) | Perry Graves | NWS | 10 | Dec 21, 1915 | 20 years, 286 days | Auditorium, Saint Paul, Minnesota, U.S. | |
| 28 | Win | 14–0 (14) | Frankie Brennan | NWS | 10 | Dec 3, 1915 | 20 years, 268 days | Armory, Minneapolis, Minnesota, U.S. | |
| 27 | Win | 14–0 (13) | Billy Kramer | NWS | 10 | Nov 29, 1915 | 20 years, 264 days | Arcadia Rink, Milwaukee, Wisconsin, U.S. | |
| 26 | Win | 14–0 (12) | Jakob "Soldier" Bartfield | NWS | 10 | Nov 12, 1915 | 20 years, 247 days | Arena, Hudson, Wisconsin, U.S. | |
| 25 | Draw | 14–0 (11) | Silent Martin | NWS | 10 | Oct 22, 1915 | 20 years, 226 days | Armory, Minneapolis, Minnesota, U.S. | |
| 24 | Win | 14–0 (10) | Walter Monaghan | NWS | 10 | Sep 23, 1915 | 20 years, 197 days | Duluth Athletic Club, Duluth, Wisconsin, U.S. | |
| 23 | Win | 14–0 (9) | Freddie Gilmore | KO | 5 (10) | Aug 20, 1915 | 20 years, 163 days | Auditorium, Saint Paul, Minnesota, U.S. | |
| 22 | Draw | 13–0 (9) | Willie Schaeffer | NWS | 10 | Jul 12, 1915 | 20 years, 124 days | Auditorium, Saint Paul, Minnesota, U.S. | |
| 21 | Win | 13–0 (8) | Billy Perkins | KO | 3 (10) | Jun 4, 1915 | 20 years, 86 days | Unique Theater, Eau Claire, Wisconsin, U.S. | |
| 20 | Loss | 12–0 (8) | Billy Miske | NWS | 10 | Apr 6, 1915 | 20 years, 27 days | Arena, Hudson, Wisconsin, U.S. | |
| 19 | Win | 12–0 (7) | Stockyards Tommy Murphy | TKO | 9 (10) | Mar 23, 1915 | 20 years, 13 days | Arena, Hudson, Wisconsin, U.S. | |
| 18 | Win | 11–0 (7) | Walter Monaghan | NWS | 10 | Mar 2, 1915 | 19 years, 357 days | Arena, Hudson, Wisconsin, U.S. | |
| 17 | Loss | 11–0 (6) | Willie Schaeffer | NWS | 10 | Feb 2, 1915 | 19 years, 329 days | Arena, Hudson, Wisconsin, U.S. | |
| 16 | Win | 11–0 (5) | Danny Hayes | NWS | 8 | Jan 15, 1915 | 19 years, 311 days | Hippodrome, Milwaukee, Wisconsin, U.S. | |
| 15 | Win | 11–0 (4) | Young Pinky | KO | 1 (8) | Jan 8, 1915 | 19 years, 304 days | Hippodrome, Milwaukee, Wisconsin, U.S. | |
| 14 | Win | 10–0 (4) | Billy Perkins | NWS | 10 | Dec 4, 1914 | 19 years, 269 days | Arena, Hudson, Wisconsin, U.S. | |
| 13 | Win | 10–0 (3) | Mike Graham | TKO | 8 (10) | Oct 9, 1914 | 19 years, 213 days | Arena, Hudson, Wisconsin, U.S. | |
| 12 | Win | 9–0 (3) | Labe Safro | KO | 4 (8) | Sep 2, 1914 | 19 years, 176 days | Arena, Hudson, Wisconsin, U.S. | |
| 11 | Win | 8–0 (3) | Cyclone Smith | TKO | 3 (6) | Jun 15, 1914 | 19 years, 97 days | Arena, Hudson, Wisconsin, U.S. | |
| 10 | Win | 7–0 (3) | Charles Fuhrman | TKO | 3 (8) | May 22, 1914 | 19 years, 73 days | Arena, Hudson, Wisconsin, U.S. | |
| 9 | Win | 6–0 (3) | Harold Jensen | KO | 3 (8) | Feb 6, 1914 | 19 years, 245 days | Superior, Wisconsin, U.S. | |
| 8 | Win | 5–0 (3) | Charles Fuhrman | NWS | 6 | Nov 10, 1913 | 18 years, 245 days | Superior, Wisconsin, U.S. | Exact date uncertain |
| 7 | Win | 5–0 (2) | Jack Pleunbush | KO | 2 (?) | Aug 15, 1913 | 18 years, 158 days | Saint Paul, Minnesota, U.S. | Exact date uncertain |
| 6 | ND | 4–0 (2) | Billy Miske | ND | 10 | Jul 6, 1913 | 18 years, 118 days | Saint Paul, Minnesota, U.S. | Exact date uncertain |
| 5 | Win | 4–0 (1) | Al Johnson | KO | 1 (?) | May 10, 1913 | 18 years, 61 days | Superior, Wisconsin, U.S. | Exact date uncertain |
| 4 | Win | 4–0 | Henry Gardner | KO | 1 (?) | Apr 5, 1913 | 18 years, 56 days | Superior, Wisconsin, U.S. | Exact date uncertain |
| 3 | Win | 3–0 | Mike Brown | KO | 1 (?) | Mar 5, 1913 | 17 years, 360 days | Grand Opera House, Superior, Wisconsin, U.S. | Exact date uncertain |
| 2 | Win | 2–0 | Al Johnson | KO | 1 (?) | Feb 10, 1913 | 17 years, 337 days | Superior, Wisconsin, U.S. | |
| 1 | Win | 1–0 | Harry Olsen | KO | 1 (?) | Jan 13, 1913 | 17 years, 309 days | Superior, Wisconsin, U.S. | |

=== Unofficial record ===
| 117 fights | 93 wins | 16 losses |
|---|---|---|
| By knockout | 40 | 1 |
| By decision | 52 | 15 |
| By disqualification | 1 | 0 |
| Draws | 7 | |
| No contests | 1 | |

Record with the inclusion of newspaper decisions in the win/loss/draw column.

| No. | Result | Record | Opponent | Type | Round | Date | Age | Location | Notes |
|---|---|---|---|---|---|---|---|---|---|
| 117 | Loss | 93–16–7 (1) | Jock Malone | KO | 1 (10) | Mar 16, 1923 | 28 years, 265 days | Auditorium, Saint Paul, Minnesota, U.S. | Lost NYSAC middleweight title; For world middleweight title (Ohio version) |
| 116 | Win | 93–15–7 (1) | Dave Rosenberg | DQ | 8 (12) | Nov 30, 1922 | 27 years, 265 days | Clermont Avenue Rink, New York City, New York, U.S. | Won NYSAC middleweight title |
| 115 | Loss | 92–15–7 (1) | Brian Downey | PTS | 12 | May 15, 1922 | 27 years, 66 days | Fairmont Arena, Columbus, Ohio, U.S. | For world middleweight title (Ohio version) |
| 114 | Win | 92–14–7 (1) | Mike Gibbons | PTS | 12 | May 6, 1922 | 27 years, 57 days | Queensboro Stadium, New York City, New York, U.S. | |
| 113 | Win | 91–14–7 (1) | Jakob "Soldier" Bartfield | PTS | 12 | Mar 18, 1922 | 27 years, 8 days | Clermont Avenue Rink, New York City, New York, U.S. | |
| 112 | Loss | 90–14–7 (1) | Mike Gibbons | NWS | 10 | Dec 16, 1921 | 26 years, 281 days | Auditorium, Saint Paul, Minnesota, U.S. | |
| 111 | Draw | 90–13–7 (1) | Lou Bogash | PTS | 12 | Dec 6, 1921 | 26 years, 271 days | Pioneer Sporting Club, New York City, New York, U.S. | |
| 110 | Win | 90–13–6 (1) | Johnny Paske | PTS | 12 | Nov 14, 1921 | 26 years, 218 days | Broadway Auditorium, Buffalo, New York, U.S. | |
| 109 | Loss | 89–13–6 (1) | Phil Krug | NWS | 12 | Sep 1, 1921 | 26 years, 175 days | Broad A.C., Newark, New Jersey, U.S. | |
| 108 | Loss | 89–12–6 (1) | Young Fisher | PTS | 12 | Aug 26, 1921 | 26 years, 169 days | Arena, Syracuse, New York City, New York, U.S. | |
| 107 | Win | 89–11–6 (1) | Silent Martin | TKO | 9 (12) | Aug 20, 1921 | 26 years, 163 days | Queensboro Stadium, New York City, New York, U.S. | |
| 106 | Loss | 88–11–6 (1) | Johnny Wilson | SD | 15 | Mar 17, 1921 | 26 years, 7 days | Madison Square Garden, New York City, New York, U.S. | For NYSAC and NBA middleweight titles |
| 105 | Win | 88–10–6 (1) | Len Rowlands | NWS | 8 | Dec 6, 1920 | 25 years, 271 days | Olympia A.C., Philadelphia, Pennsylvania, U.S. | |
| 104 | Win | 87–10–6 (1) | Jeff Smith | SD | 15 | Nov 9, 1920 | 25 years, 244 days | Madison Square Garden, New York City, New York, U.S. | |
| 103 | Win | 86–10–6 (1) | Frank Carbone | NWS | 10 | Oct 22, 1920 | 25 years, 226 days | Sportsman's Club, Camden, New Jersey, U.S. | |
| 102 | Win | 85–10–6 (1) | Frank Carbone | PTS | 12 | Oct 4, 1920 | 25 years, 208 days | Casino Hall, Bridgeport, Connecticut, U.S. | |
| 101 | Win | 84–10–6 (1) | Ted "Kid" Lewis | NWS | 12 | Sep 23, 1920 | 25 years, 197 days | Westside Ballpark, Jersey City, New Jersey, U.S. | |
| 100 | Win | 83–10–6 (1) | Sailor Ed Petroskey | NWS | 8 | Sep 15, 1920 | 25 years, 189 days | Ice Palace, Philadelphia, Pennsylvania, U.S. | |
| 99 | Win | 82–10–6 (1) | Tommy Robson | PTS | 12 | Aug 21, 1920 | 25 years, 164 days | Cuddy's Arena, Lawrence, Massachusetts, U.S. | |
| 98 | Win | 81–10–6 (1) | Gordon McKay | TKO | 12 (15) | Jul 5, 1920 | 25 years, 117 days | Brady Park, Pocatello, Idaho, U.S. | |
| 97 | Draw | 80–10–6 (1) | Battling Ortega | PTS | 10 | Jun 24, 1920 | 25 years, 106 days | Arena, Milwaukie, Oregon, U.S. | |
| 96 | Win | 80–10–5 (1) | George K.O. Brown | KO | 6 (8) | May 19, 1920 | 25 years, 70 days | Ice Palace, Philadelphia, Pennsylvania, U.S. | |
| 95 | Win | 79–10–5 (1) | Jack Britton | NWS | 12 | May 17, 1920 | 25 years, 68 days | Canton Auditorium, Canton, Ohio, U.S. | |
| 94 | Win | 78–10–5 (1) | Jackie Clark | NWS | 10 | May 11, 1920 | 25 years, 62 days | Sportsman's Club, Camden, New Jersey, U.S. | |
| 93 | Loss | 77–10–5 (1) | Johnny Wilson | PTS | 12 | May 6, 1920 | 25 years, 57 days | Mechanics Building, Boston, Massachusetts, U.S. | Lost NYSAC middleweight title |
| 92 | Win | 77–9–5 (1) | K.O. Samson | TKO | 4 (6) | Apr 26, 1920 | 25 years, 47 days | Olympia A.C., Philadelphia, Pennsylvania, U.S. | |
| 91 | Win | 76–9–5 (1) | Walter Laurette | TKO | 6 (12) | Apr 15, 1920 | 25 years, 36 days | Casino Hall, Bridgeport, Connecticut, U.S. | |
| 90 | Win | 75–9–5 (1) | Frankie Maguire | NWS | 6 | Apr 3, 1920 | 25 years, 24 days | National A.C., Philadelphia, Pennsylvania, U.S. | |
| 89 | Win | 74–9–5 (1) | Joe Eagan | KO | 5 (12) | Mar 30, 1920 | 25 years, 20 days | Mechanics Building, Boston, Massachusetts, U.S. | |
| 88 | Win | 73–9–5 (1) | Augie Ratner | NWS | 10 | Mar 17, 1920 | 25 years, 7 days | Auditorium, Saint Paul, Minnesota, U.S. | World middleweight title at stake; (via KO only) |
| 87 | Win | 72–9–5 (1) | Tommy Madden | KO | 4 (12) | Mar 12, 1920 | 25 years, 2 days | Stockyards Stadium, Denver, Colorado, U.S. | |
| 86 | Win | 71–9–5 (1) | Stockyards Tommy Murphy | TKO | 9 (10) | Mar 5, 1920 | 24 years, 361 days | Auditorium, Atlanta, Georgia, U.S. | |
| 85 | Win | 70–9–5 (1) | Jack McCarron | TKO | 2 (6) | Mar 1, 1920 | 24 years, 357 days | Olympia A.C., Philadelphia, Pennsylvania, U.S. | |
| 84 | Win | 69–9–5 (1) | Young Fisher | KO | 3 (10) | Jan 26, 1920 | 24 years, 322 days | Grand Opera House, Syracuse, New York, U.S. | |
| 83 | Win | 68–9–5 (1) | Stockyards Tommy Murphy | TKO | 3 (12) | Jan 20, 1920 | 24 years, 316 days | Mechanics Building, Boston, Massachusetts, U.S. | |
| 82 | Win | 67–9–5 (1) | Frank Carbone | NWS | 10 | Jan 14, 1920 | 24 years, 310 days | Auditorium, Saint Paul, Minnesota, U.S. | |
| 81 | Win | 66–9–5 (1) | Mike Gibbons | NWS | 10 | Nov 21, 1919 | 24 years, 256 days | Auditorium, Saint Paul, Minnesota, U.S. | World middleweight title at stake; (via KO only) |
| 80 | Win | 65–9–5 (1) | Jimmy O'Hagan | KO | 2 (10) | Nov 10, 1919 | 24 years, 245 days | Roller Palace Rink, Detroit, New Jersey, U.S. | Retained world middleweight title |
| 79 | Win | 64–9–5 (1) | Billy Kramer | KO | 2 (8) | Nov 6, 1919 | 24 years, 241 days | Lyceum Theater, Paterson, New Jersey, U.S. | Retained world middleweight title |
| 78 | Win | 63–9–5 (1) | Jack Connors | KO | 2 (12) | Oct 30, 1919 | 24 years, 234 days | Marieville Gardens, North Providence, Rhode Island, U.S. | |
| 77 | Win | 62–9–5 (1) | Steve Latzo | NWS | 6 | Oct 18, 1919 | 24 years, 222 days | National A.C., Philadelphia, Pennsylvania, U.S. | |
| 76 | Win | 61–9–5 (1) | Augie Ratner | NWS | 8 | Sep 29, 1919 | 24 years, 203 days | Open-Air Arena, Jersey City, New Jersey, U.S. | |
| 75 | Win | 60–9–5 (1) | Jakob "Soldier" Bartfield | NWS | 10 | Sep 19, 1919 | 24 years, 193 days | Auditorium, Saint Paul, Minnesota, U.S. | World middleweight title at stake; (via KO only) |
| 74 | Win | 59–9–5 (1) | Ted "Kid" Lewis | NWS | 10 | Sep 1, 1919 | 24 years, 175 days | 1st Regiment Armory, Newark, New Jersey, U.S. | World middleweight title at stake; (via KO only) |
| 73 | Loss | 58–9–5 (1) | Jack Britton | NWS | 8 | Aug 22, 1919 | 24 years, 165 days | 1st Regiment Armory, Newark, New Jersey, U.S. | |
| 72 | Win | 58–8–5 (1) | Jackie Clark | NWS | 10 | Aug 11, 1919 | 24 years, 154 days | Arena, Syracuse, New York, U.S. | World middleweight title at stake; (via KO only) |
| 71 | Win | 57–8–5 (1) | Young Fisher | KO | 5 (10) | Jul 21, 1919 | 24 years, 133 days | Arena, Syracuse, New York, U.S. | |
| 70 | Win | 56–8–5 (1) | Al McCoy | KO | 3 (10) | Jul 17, 1919 | 24 years, 129 days | Lexington Park, Saint Paul, Minnesota, U.S. | |
| 69 | Draw | 55–8–5 (1) | Harry Greb | NWS | 10 | Feb 25, 1918 | 22 years, 352 days | Auditorium, Saint Paul, Minnesota, U.S. | World middleweight title at stake; (via KO only) |
| 68 | Win | 55–8–4 (1) | Joe Welsh | NWS | 6 | Dec 19, 1917 | 22 years, 284 days | National A.C., Philadelphia, Pennsylvania, U.S. | |
| 67 | Win | 54–8–4 (1) | Billy Kramer | NWS | 6 | Dec 15, 1917 | 22 years, 280 days | National A.C., Philadelphia, Pennsylvania, U.S. | World middleweight title at stake; (via KO only) |
| 66 | Win | 53–8–4 (1) | Jack McCarron | NWS | 6 | Nov 24, 1917 | 22 years, 259 days | National A.C., Philadelphia, Pennsylvania, U.S. | |
| 65 | Win | 52–8–4 (1) | Al McCoy | KO | 6 (10) | Nov 14, 1917 | 22 years, 249 days | Clermont Avenue Rink, New York City, New York, U.S. | Won NYSAC middleweight title |
| 64 | Win | 51–8–4 (1) | Frank Carbone | NWS | 10 | Nov 1, 1917 | 22 years, 236 days | Clermont Avenue Rink, New York City, New York, U.S. | |
| 63 | Win | 50–8–4 (1) | Jerry Cole | TKO | 3 (10) | Oct 27, 1917 | 22 years, 231 days | Broadway Arena, New York City, New York, U.S. | |
| 62 | Win | 49–8–4 (1) | K.O. Willie Loughlin | KO | 2 (10) | Oct 4, 1917 | 22 years, 208 days | Clermont Avenue Rink, New York City, New York, U.S. | |
| 61 | Win | 48–8–4 (1) | Joe Connolly | TKO | 4 (12) | Sep 25, 1917 | 22 years, 199 days | Arena, Boston, Massachusetts, U.S. | |
| 60 | Win | 47–8–4 (1) | Italian Joe Gans | NWS | 10 | Sep 6, 1917 | 22 years, 180 days | Clermont Avenue Rink, Massachusetts, U.S. | |
| 59 | Win | 46–8–4 (1) | Ted "Kid" Lewis | PTS | 12 | Aug 28, 1917 | 22 years, 171 days | Arena, Boston, Massachusetts, U.S. | |
| 58 | Loss | 45–8–4 (1) | Ted "Kid" Lewis | NWS | 10 | Aug 17, 1917 | 22 years, 160 days | St. Nicholas Arena, New York City, New York, U.S. | |
| 57 | Win | 45–7–4 (1) | Frank Carbone | NWS | 10 | Aug 11, 1917 | 22 years, 154 days | Broadway S.C., New York City, New York, U.S. | |
| 56 | Win | 44–7–4 (1) | Tommy Madden | KO | 3 (10) | Aug 9, 1917 | 22 years, 152 days | Clermont Avenue Rink, New York City, New York, U.S. | |
| 55 | Win | 43–7–4 (1) | Jakob "Soldier" Bartfield | NWS | 10 | Jun 28, 1917 | 22 years, 110 days | Clermont Avenue Rink, New York City, New York, U.S. | |
| 54 | Loss | 42–7–4 (1) | Zulu Kid | NWS | 10 | Jun 16, 1917 | 22 years, 98 days | Clermont Avenue Rink, New York City, New York, U.S. | |
| 53 | Loss | 42–6–4 (1) | Ted "Kid" Lewis | NWS | 10 | May 24, 1917 | 22 years, 75 days | St. Nicholas Arena, New York City, New York, U.S. | |
| 52 | Win | 42–5–4 (1) | Silent Martin | NWS | 10 | May 22, 1917 | 22 years, 73 days | Broadway S.C., New York City, New York, U.S. | |
| 51 | Win | 41–5–4 (1) | Italian Joe Gans | NWS | 10 | May 17, 1917 | 22 years, 68 days | Clermont Avenue Rink, New York City, New York, U.S. | |
| 50 | Win | 40–5–4 (1) | Jack Britton | NWS | 10 | May 8, 1917 | 22 years, 59 days | Broadway S.C., New York City, New York, U.S. | |
| 49 | Win | 39–5–4 (1) | Silent Martin | PTS | 15 | May 4, 1917 | 22 years, 55 days | Marieville Gardens, North Providence, Rhode Island, U.S. | |
| 48 | Win | 38–5–4 (1) | Frank Carbone | PTS | 12 | Apr 17, 1917 | 22 years, 38 days | Grand Opera House, Boston, Massachusetts, U.S. | |
| 47 | Win | 37–5–4 (1) | Jakob "Soldier" Bartfield | NWS | 10 | Apr 12, 1917 | 22 years, 33 days | Clermont Avenue Rink, New York City, New York, U.S. | |
| 46 | Win | 36–5–4 (1) | Frank Carbone | NWS | 10 | Mar 31, 1917 | 22 years, 21 days | Clermont Avenue Rink, New York City, New York, U.S. | |
| 45 | Loss | 35–5–4 (1) | Joe Eagan | PTS | 12 | Mar 20, 1917 | 22 years, 10 days | Grand Opera House, Boston, Massachusetts, U.S. | |
| 44 | Loss | 35–4–4 (1) | Jack Britton | NWS | 10 | Jan 25, 1917 | 21 years, 321 days | Auditorium, Saint Paul, Minnesota, U.S. | |
| 43 | Win | 35–3–4 (1) | Frank Carbone | PTS | 15 | Jan 3, 1917 | 21 years, 299 days | Marieville Gardens, North Providence, Rhode Island, U.S. | |
| 42 | Win | 34–3–4 (1) | Johnny 'Kid' Alberts | NWS | 10 | Jan 1, 1917 | 21 years, 297 days | Clermont Avenue Rink, New York City, New York, U.S. | |
| 41 | Win | 33–3–4 (1) | Jack Toland | TKO | 2 (12) | Dec 20, 1916 | 21 years, 285 days | National A.C., Providence, Rhode Island, U.S. | |
| 40 | Win | 32–3–4 (1) | Eddie Moha | NWS | 10 | Nov 30, 1916 | 21 years, 265 days | Eau Claire, Wisconsin, U.S. | |
| 39 | Win | 31–3–4 (1) | Frank Carbone | PTS | 15 | Nov 15, 1916 | 21 years, 250 days | Marieville Gardens, North Providence, Rhode Island, U.S. | |
| 38 | Win | 30–3–4 (1) | Frank Barrieau | KO | 6 (15) | Oct 23, 1916 | 21 years, 227 days | National A.C., Denver, Colorado, U.S. | |
| 37 | Win | 29–3–4 (1) | Mickey Sheridan | NWS | 10 | Aug 18, 1916 | 21 years, 161 days | Auditorium, Saint Paul, Minnesota, U.S. | |
| 36 | Win | 28–3–4 (1) | Willie Adams | KO | 4 (10) | Jun 14, 1916 | 21 years, 96 days | Clermont Avenue Rink, New York City, New York, U.S. | |
| 35 | Loss | 27–3–4 (1) | Jack Britton | PTS | 12 | Jun 6, 1916 | 21 years, 88 days | Arena, Boston, Massachusetts, U.S. | |
| 34 | Win | 27–2–4 (1) | Joe Eagan | TKO | 9 (12) | Apr 25, 1916 | 21 years, 46 days | Arena (Armory A.A.), Boston, Massachusetts, U.S. | |
| 33 | Win | 26–2–4 (1) | Jack Toland | NWS | 10 | Apr 6, 1916 | 21 years, 27 days | Clermont Avenue Rink, New York City, New York, U.S. | |
| 32 | Win | 25–2–4 (1) | Terry Mitchell | TKO | 8 (10) | Mar 25, 1916 | 21 years, 15 days | Clermont Avenue Rink, New York City, New York, U.S. | |
| 31 | Win | 24–2–4 (1) | Young Erne | NWS | 6 | Mar 18, 1916 | 21 years, 8 days | National A.C., Philadelphia, Pennsylvania, U.S. | |
| 30 | Draw | 23–2–4 (1) | Willie Schaeffer | PTS | 10 | Mar 13, 1916 | 21 years, 3 days | Academy of Music, Kansas City, Missouri, U.S. | |
| 29 | Draw | 23–2–3 (1) | Perry Graves | NWS | 10 | Dec 21, 1915 | 20 years, 286 days | Auditorium, Saint Paul, Minnesota, U.S. | |
| 28 | Win | 23–2–2 (1) | Frankie Brennan | NWS | 10 | Dec 3, 1915 | 20 years, 268 days | Armory, Minneapolis, Minnesota, U.S. | |
| 27 | Win | 22–2–2 (1) | Billy Kramer | NWS | 10 | Nov 29, 1915 | 20 years, 264 days | Arcadia Rink, Milwaukee, Wisconsin, U.S. | |
| 26 | Win | 21–2–2 (1) | Jakob "Soldier" Bartfield | NWS | 10 | Nov 12, 1915 | 20 years, 247 days | Arena, Hudson, Wisconsin, U.S. | |
| 25 | Draw | 20–2–2 (1) | Silent Martin | NWS | 10 | Oct 22, 1915 | 20 years, 226 days | Armory, Minneapolis, Minnesota, U.S. | |
| 24 | Win | 20–2–1 (1) | Walter Monaghan | NWS | 10 | Sep 23, 1915 | 20 years, 197 days | Duluth Athletic Club, Duluth, Wisconsin, U.S. | |
| 23 | Win | 19–2–1 (1) | Freddie Gilmore | KO | 5 (10) | Aug 20, 1915 | 20 years, 163 days | Auditorium, Saint Paul, Minnesota, U.S. | |
| 22 | Draw | 18–2–1 (1) | Willie Schaeffer | NWS | 10 | Jul 12, 1915 | 20 years, 124 days | Auditorium, Saint Paul, Minnesota, U.S. | |
| 21 | Win | 18–2 (1) | Billy Perkins | KO | 3 (10) | Jun 4, 1915 | 20 years, 86 days | Unique Theater, Eau Claire, Wisconsin, U.S. | |
| 20 | Loss | 17–2 (1) | Billy Miske | NWS | 10 | Apr 6, 1915 | 20 years, 27 days | Arena, Hudson, Wisconsin, U.S. | |
| 19 | Win | 17–1 (1) | Stockyards Tommy Murphy | TKO | 9 (10) | Mar 23, 1915 | 20 years, 13 days | Arena, Hudson, Wisconsin, U.S. | |
| 18 | Win | 16–1 (1) | Walter Monaghan | NWS | 10 | Mar 2, 1915 | 19 years, 357 days | Arena, Hudson, Wisconsin, U.S. | |
| 17 | Loss | 15–1 (1) | Willie Schaeffer | NWS | 10 | Feb 2, 1915 | 19 years, 329 days | Arena, Hudson, Wisconsin, U.S. | |
| 16 | Win | 15–0 (1) | Danny Hayes | NWS | 8 | Jan 15, 1915 | 19 years, 311 days | Hippodrome, Milwaukee, Wisconsin, U.S. | |
| 15 | Win | 14–0 (1) | Young Pinky | KO | 1 (8) | Jan 8, 1915 | 19 years, 304 days | Hippodrome, Milwaukee, Wisconsin, U.S. | |
| 14 | Win | 13–0 (1) | Billy Perkins | NWS | 10 | Dec 4, 1914 | 19 years, 269 days | Arena, Hudson, Wisconsin, U.S. | |
| 13 | Win | 12–0 (1) | Mike Graham | TKO | 8 (10) | Oct 9, 1914 | 19 years, 213 days | Arena, Hudson, Wisconsin, U.S. | |
| 12 | Win | 11–0 (1) | Labe Safro | KO | 4 (8) | Sep 2, 1914 | 19 years, 176 days | Arena, Hudson, Wisconsin, U.S. | |
| 11 | Win | 10–0 (1) | Cyclone Smith | TKO | 3 (6) | Jun 15, 1914 | 19 years, 97 days | Arena, Hudson, Wisconsin, U.S. | |
| 10 | Win | 9–0 (1) | Charles Fuhrman | TKO | 3 (8) | May 22, 1914 | 19 years, 73 days | Arena, Hudson, Wisconsin, U.S. | |
| 9 | Win | 8–0 (1) | Harold Jensen | KO | 3 (8) | Feb 6, 1914 | 19 years, 245 days | Superior, Wisconsin, U.S. | |
| 8 | Win | 7–0 (1) | Charles Fuhrman | NWS | 6 | Nov 10, 1913 | 18 years, 245 days | Superior, Wisconsin, U.S. | Exact date uncertain |
| 7 | Win | 6–0 (1) | Jack Pleunbush | KO | 2 (?) | Aug 15, 1913 | 18 years, 158 days | Saint Paul, Minnesota, U.S. | Exact date uncertain |
| 6 | ND | 5–0 (1) | Billy Miske | ND | 10 | Jul 6, 1913 | 18 years, 118 days | Saint Paul, Minnesota, U.S. | Exact date uncertain |
| 5 | Win | 5–0 | Al Johnson | KO | 1 (?) | May 10, 1913 | 18 years, 61 days | Superior, Wisconsin, U.S. | Exact date uncertain |
| 4 | Win | 4–0 | Henry Gardner | KO | 1 (?) | Apr 5, 1913 | 18 years, 56 days | Superior, Wisconsin, U.S. | Exact date uncertain |
| 3 | Win | 3–0 | Mike Brown | KO | 1 (?) | Mar 5, 1913 | 17 years, 360 days | Grand Opera House, Superior, Wisconsin, U.S. | Exact date uncertain |
| 2 | Win | 2–0 | Al Johnson | KO | 1 (?) | Feb 10, 1913 | 17 years, 337 days | Superior, Wisconsin, U.S. | |
| 1 | Win | 1–0 | Harry Olsen | KO | 1 (?) | Jan 13, 1913 | 17 years, 309 days | Superior, Wisconsin, U.S. | |

== See also ==
- List of middleweight boxing champions

Achievements
| Preceded by Al McCoy | World Middleweight Champion; November 14, 1917 – May 6, 1920 | Succeeded by Johnny Wilson |
