= 1920 Epsom Derby =

141st running of the Epsom Derby horse race

- Epsom Derby
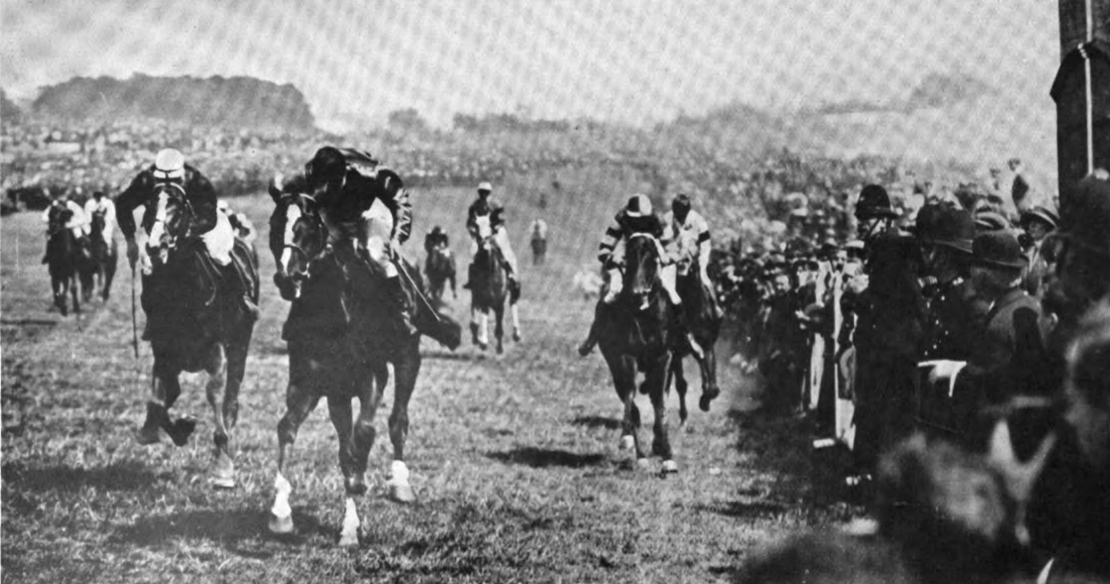
- Spion Kop wins the Epsom Derby
- Location: Epsom Downs Racecourse
- Date: 2 June 1920
- Winning horse: Spion Kop
- Starting price: 100/6
- Jockey: Frank O'Neill
- Trainer: Peter Gilpin
- Owner: Giles Loder

The 1920 Epsom Derby was a horse race which took place at Epsom Downs on 2 June 1920. It was the 141st running of the Derby and was won by Giles Loder's Spion Kop. The winner was ridden by the American jockey Frank O'Neill and trained by Peter Gilpin.

== Race details ==
- Prize money to winner: £5850
- Number of runners: 19
- Winner's time: 2m 34.8s

== The race ==
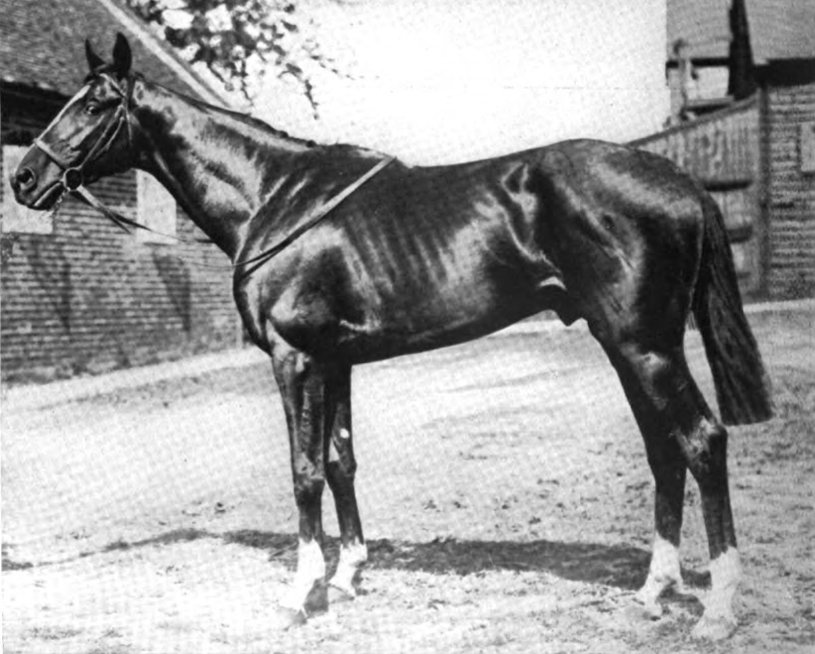
Spion Kop, winner of the 1920 Derby

The Derby was run on an unusually hot day in front of an estimated crowd of 250,000 including the King and Queen. Spion Kop started at odd of 100/6 (approximately 16/1) in a field of 19 runners. The favourite was the 2000 Guineas winner Tetratema a colt noted for his exceptional early speed but with dubious stamina. Tetratema went into an early lead and set an extremely fast pace as he was challenged by Abbot's Trace (ridden by Steve Donoghue), while O’Neill settled Spion Kop well back in the field. Tetratema dropped back soon after half way and Abbot's Trace led into the straight as Spion Kop made rapid progress from the rear. Spion Kop took the lead three furlongs from the finish and ran on strongly up the straight to win by two lengths from Archaic and Orpheus in a new race record time of 2:34.8. The most dramatic incident of the race occurred in the closing stages when Abbot's Trace was brought down in a collision with Sarchedon, who finished fourth.

== Full result ==
	*	Horse	Jockey	Trainer	SP
1		Spion Kop	Frank O'Neill	Peter Gilpin	100/6
2	2	Archaic	George Bellhouse		100/7
3	1½	Orpheus	Felix Leach, Jr	Felix Leach	50/1
4		Sarchedon	Arthur Smith	Peter Gilpin	9/1
5		Poltava	Herbert Jones	Percy Linton	50/1
6		Daylight Patrol	Joe Childs	John Watson	33/1
7		Torelore	Arthur Balding	Atty Persse	66/1
8		Polumetis	T Burns		22/1
9		He Goes	Fred Templeman	Joseph Butters	100/7
10		Silvern	Albert Whalley	Frank Hartigan	40/1
11		Kerasos	Joe Shatwell		100/1
12		All Prince	Freddie Fox	Reg Day	100/1
13		Dynamo	Herbert Robbins		25/1
14		Tetratema	Brownie Carslake	Atty Persse	3/1 fav
17		Attilius	Willam Saxby	Richard Dawson	33/1
16		Marshal Neil	George Hulme		100/1
17		Firework	Elijah Wheatley		20/1
PU		Allenby	Fred Slade	Percy Linton	8/1
fell		Abbot's Trace	Steve Donoghue		33/1

* The distances between the horses are shown in lengths or shorter. shd = short-head; hd = head; PU = pulled up.

== Winner's details ==
Further details of the winner, Spion Kop:

- Foaled: 1917
- Sire: Spearmint; Dam: Hammerkop (Gallinule)
- Owner: Giles Loder
- Breeder: Giles Loder
