= Charlebelle =

Irish-bred Thoroughbred racehorse

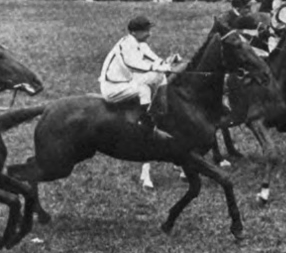
- Charlebelle at 1920 Epsom Oaks.
- Sire: Charles O'Malley
- Grandsire: Desmond
- Dam: Bushey Belle
- Damsire: Bushey Park
- Sex: Mare
- Foaled: 1917
- Country: United Kingdom of Great Britain and Ireland
- Colour: Black
- Breeder: Mr. Alan R. Cunliffe
- Owner: Mr. Alan R. Cunliffe
- Trainer: Sandy Braime
- Record: 11:5-1-0

Major wins
- Epsom Oaks (1920)

Charlebelle (1917–1931) was a British Thoroughbred racehorse and broodmare that won the 1920 Epsom Oaks.

== Background ==
Charlebelle was bred and owned by Alan Cunliffe. She was foaled in 1917 at Cunliffe's Greenfields Stud in County Tipperary, Ireland. Her sire, Charles O'Malley was third to Lemberg in the 1910 Epsom Derby.

She was described as a "very delicate filly" and had a black coat with a small white star. As of 2000, Charlebelle was the last black horse to have won a British Classic race. Initially trained by Sandy Braime for her Oaks win, by 1922 she was trained by Morley at Woodford.

== Racing career ==
=== 1919: two-year-old season ===
In August, Charlebelle was the favourite for the International Two-year-old Plate run at Sandown Park. She ran "very badly", finishing unplaced to the winner Paragon. In September at Newbury, she won five-furlong Donnington Castle Maiden Two-year-old Plate against a large field of 19 horses, beating the colt Tetricus by a head. Charlebelle won the 300-sovereign Reading Nursery Handicap under a heavy weight penalty, carrying 116 pounds and winning by five lengths over Rothschild's grey filly Vinny. On 22 November at Manchester for her last outing of the season, Charlebelle contested the six-furlong Lancashire Nursery Handicap against a large field. She was favoured at 11-4 odds and won the race by a head over March Along after what was described as a "great race."

=== 1920: three-year-old season ===
In her first start of the season in May at Hurst Park, Charlebelle was second to King's Idler by four lengths in the mile-long Holiday Handicap.

On 4 June, Charlebelle started in the Oaks Stakes in a field of 17 horses, Lord Glanley's Bright Folly scratching shortly before the running, over the one and a half mile course. The start of the race was delayed by Mr. Singer's filly Aeon refusing to join the starting line. From the start, Valescure set the pace with Sir Robert Jardine's Cinna and Charlebelle (ridden by A. Whalley) close behind. Valescure's stamina faltered at Tattenham Corner, allowing Cinna and Charlebelle to fight for the lead on the rail. Whalley forced Charlebelle into the front in the final seconds of the race, winning by a neck over Cinna. An inquiry was made over the unseating of one jockey, Freddie Fox who was riding Saffron, during the running but this was ruled accidental and did not affect the placings. Fox returned to the finish line riding a horse borrowed from a policeman.

In June, she was exported to France to run in the Grand Prix. After two false starts and receiving a kick from other horse on the starting line, Charlebelle lead the race for the initial moments before dropping back out of contention as the field entered the straight. She finished unplaced behind the winner Comrade.

=== 1921–1922: four and five-year-old season ===
Remaining in training as a four-year-old, Charlebelle was unplaced in the Great Jubilee Plate at Kempton Park. She was entered for the Cambridgeshire Stakes, but was later withdrawn. She was also unplaced in the Manchester November Handicap. Returning in March 1922, Charlebelle was unplaced in the Lincolnshire Handicap at Lincoln, the Queen's Prize at Kempton in April and the June Rose Handicap at Sandown. In August, she won the 500-sovereign North Surrey Handicap. But following the win she continued with a string of losses, Charlebelle was unplaced in the Kempton Park Great Jubilee Handicap in September and in the Newbury Autumn Handicap.

== Breeding career ==
Retired to broodmare duty, Charlebelle produced the colt International, a minor racing success, to the cover of Buchan and Sir Percival by Prince Galahad . Charlebelle was exported in 1926 to B. B. Jones' Audley Stud in Berryville, Virginia. She produced three fillies in the United States: Lillabelle by Buchan, Highland Belle by High Cloud and Lady Whelan by Bright Knight. Charlebelle died in 1931.

== Pedigree ==
Pedigree of Charlebelle (IRE), black mare, 1917
Sire Charles O'Malley (GB) 1907	Desmond; 1896	St. Simon	Galopin
Sire Charles O'Malley (GB) 1907	Desmond; 1896	St. Simon	St. Angela
Sire Charles O'Malley (GB) 1907	Desmond; 1896	L'Abbesse de Jouarre	Trappist
Sire Charles O'Malley (GB) 1907	Desmond; 1896	L'Abbesse de Jouarre	Festive
Sire Charles O'Malley (GB) 1907	Goody Two Shoes bay 1899	Isinglass	Isonomy
Sire Charles O'Malley (GB) 1907	Goody Two Shoes bay 1899	Isinglass	Dead Lock
Sire Charles O'Malley (GB) 1907	Goody Two Shoes bay 1899	Sandal	Kisber (HUN)
Sire Charles O'Malley (GB) 1907	Goody Two Shoes bay 1899	Sandal	Shoestring
Dam Bushey Belle (IRE) 1900	Bushey Park (GB); 1889	Hampton	Lord Clifden
Dam Bushey Belle (IRE) 1900	Bushey Park (GB); 1889	Hampton	Lady Langden
Dam Bushey Belle (IRE) 1900	Bushey Park (GB); 1889	Sunshine	Thormanby
Dam Bushey Belle (IRE) 1900	Bushey Park (GB); 1889	Sunshine	Sunbeam
Dam Bushey Belle (IRE) 1900	Lady Atheling (IRE); 1890	Atheling	Sterling
Dam Bushey Belle (IRE) 1900	Lady Atheling (IRE); 1890	Atheling	King Tom mare
Dam Bushey Belle (IRE) 1900	Lady Atheling (IRE); 1890	Lady Miltown	Wild Oats
Dam Bushey Belle (IRE) 1900	Lady Atheling (IRE); 1890	Lady Miltown	Down With the Dust (Family No. 1)
