= Cinna (horse) =

British-bred Thoroughbred racehorse

- Sire: Polymelus
- Grandsire: Cyllene
- Dam: Baroness La Fleche
- Damsire: Ladas
- Sex: Mare
- Foaled: 1917
- Country: United Kingdom
- Colour: Bay
- Breeder: Sir Robert Jardine, 2nd Baronet
- Owner: Sir Robert Jardine
- Trainer: Tom Waugh, Sr.
- Record: 7: 3-3-1

Major wins
- 1000 Guineas (1920); Coronation Stakes (1920)

Cinna (1917 – 1939) was a British Thoroughbred racehorse and broodmare. She showed great promise as a juvenile in 1919 when she won a very competitive maiden race on her debut before finishing second in the New Stakes and the Bretby Stakes. As a three-year-old she won the 1000 Guineas and the Coronation Stakes and was narrowly beaten when favourite for the Epsom Oaks. She was retired from racing at the end of the year and went on to be a very successful broodmare. Three of her sons became leading sires in Australasia whilst several of her daughters became influential broodmares including the female-line ancestors of Sunday Silence and Indian Ridge.

== Background ==
Cinna was a bay mare bred and owned by Sir Robert William Buchanan Jardine, 2nd Baronet. She was trained throughout her racing career by Tom Waugh Sr at the Meynell House stable in Newmarket, Suffolk.

She was sired by Polymelus, who won the Champion Stakes in 1906, and went on to much greater success as a stallion. He sired the Derby winners Pommern, Humorist and Fifinella and through his son Phalaris is the direct male-line ancestor of most modern Thoroughbreds. He was the Leading sire in Great Britain and Ireland on five occasions. Cinna's dam Baroness La Fleche was winning daughter of the Fillies’ Triple Crown winner La Fleche.

== Racing career ==
=== 1919: two-year-old season ===
Cinna began her racing career in May 1919 when she won the Norfolk Plate at Newmarket Racecourse, beating Woodrow into second place. Several other good horses came out of the race including the winners of the Woodcote Stakes, Richmond Stakes and Free Handicap. On her next appearance, the filly was sent to Royal Ascot for the New Stakes in June and finished second to the colt Orpheus. After a break she returned to action at Newmarket in autumn and was runner-up behind King George V's filly Lemonade in the Bretby Stakes.

=== 1920: three-year-old season ===
On 30 April Cinna started at odds of 4/1 second favourite behind Lemonade in a 21-runner field for the 107th running of the 1000 Guineas over the Rowley Mile at Newmarket. Ridden by Billy Griggs she took the lead soon after the start and was never seriously challenged, coming home three lengths clear Cicerole with Valescure a length away in third. Cinna's winning time of was 1:40.4 was 2.6 seconds faster than the time set by Tetratema in the 2000 Guineas two days earlier.

In the Oaks Stakes over one and a half miles at Epsom Racecourse on 4 May Cinna was partnered by Griggs' younger brother Walter and started the 2/1 favourite against sixteen opponents. She took the lead in the straight but was overtaken by the rallying Charlebelle in the final strides and was beaten a neck into second place, after what was described as a "most exciting struggle".

Cinna was then dropped back in distance for the Coronation Stakes over one mile at Royal Ascot. She started at odds of 2/1 and produced a "very smooth performance" to win by a short-head from Redhead with La Dauphine in third. Her victory took her earnings for the year to £8,576. At Goodwood Racecourse she finished third behind Most Beautiful and Redhead in the ten-furlong Nassau Stakes.

== Assessment and honours ==
In their book, A Century of Champions, based on the Timeform rating system, John Randall and Tony Morris rated Cinna an "inferior" winner of the 1000 Guineas.

== Breeding record ==
Cinna was a prolific broodmare, producing at least fifteen foals between 1922 and 1939:

- Gay Shield, a bay colt, foaled in 1922, sired by Gay Crusader
- Buckler, brown colt, 1923, by Buchan
- Life Belt, chestnut filly, 1925, by Hurry On. Female-line ancestor of Indian Ridge and Fraise du Bois (Irish Derby).
- Belle Mere, brown filly, 1926, by Son-in-Law. Female-line ancestor of Sunday Silence, Gold and Black and Dulcify.
- Beau Pere, brown colt, 1927, by Son-in-Law. Three-time Leading sire in Australia. and twice Leading sire in New Zealand.
- Hot Haste, chestnut colt, 1928, by Hurry On
- Buchna, bay filly, 1929, by Buchan. Female-line ancestor of Nicer.
- Sunset, chestnut filly, 1930, by Solario
- Mr Standfast, bay colt, 1931, by Buchan. Champion stallion in Queensland.
- Cineraria, bay filly, 1932, by Diomedes
- Italian Bomber, brown colt (later gelded), 1933, by Nothing Venture
- Dink, bay colt, 1934, by Nothing Venture
- Cinnabell, bay filly, 1937, by Nothing Venture
- Celebrity, chestnut filly, 1938, by Nothing Venture. Female-line ancestor of Sky Chase (Rosehill Guineas) and Show A Heart (The T J Smith).
- Balloch, brown colt, 1939, by Obliterate. Twice Leading sire in New Zealand.

Cinna was euthanised in 1939.

== Pedigree ==
Pedigree of Cinna (GB), bay mare, 1917
Sire Polymelus (GB) 1902	Cyllene; 1895	Bona Vista	Bend Or
Sire Polymelus (GB) 1902	Cyllene; 1895	Bona Vista	Vista
Sire Polymelus (GB) 1902	Cyllene; 1895	Arcadia	Isonomy
Sire Polymelus (GB) 1902	Cyllene; 1895	Arcadia	Distant Shore
Sire Polymelus (GB) 1902	Maid Marian; 1886	Hampton	Lord Clifden
Sire Polymelus (GB) 1902	Maid Marian; 1886	Hampton	Lady Langden
Sire Polymelus (GB) 1902	Maid Marian; 1886	Quiver	Toxophilite
Sire Polymelus (GB) 1902	Maid Marian; 1886	Quiver	Young Melbourne mare
Dam Baroness La Fleche (GB) 1903	Ladas; 1891	Hampton	Lord Clifden
Dam Baroness La Fleche (GB) 1903	Ladas; 1891	Hampton	Lady Langden
Dam Baroness La Fleche (GB) 1903	Ladas; 1891	Illuminata	Rosicrucian
Dam Baroness La Fleche (GB) 1903	Ladas; 1891	Illuminata	Paraffin
Dam Baroness La Fleche (GB) 1903	La Fleche; 1889	St Simon	Galopin
Dam Baroness La Fleche (GB) 1903	La Fleche; 1889	St Simon	St Angela
Dam Baroness La Fleche (GB) 1903	La Fleche; 1889	Quiver	Toxophilite
Dam Baroness La Fleche (GB) 1903	La Fleche; 1889	Quiver	Young Melbourne mare (Family 3-e)

- Cinna was inbred 3 × 3 to both Hampton and Quiver, meaning that both of these horses appeared twice in the third generation of her pedigree.
