= 1920 Currie Cup =

Domestic rugby union competition

- Countries: South Africa
- Champions: Western Province (10th title)

The 1920 Currie Cup was the 12th edition of the Currie Cup, the premier domestic rugby union competition in South Africa.

The tournament was won by Western Province for the tenth time.

== See also ==
- Currie Cup
