= K.O. Sweeney =

New York boxer

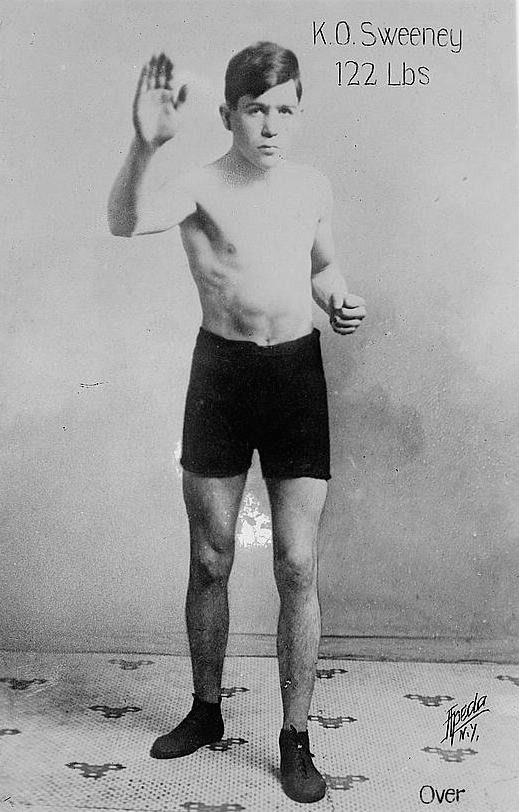
K.O. Sweeney photographed in New York circa 1911

K.O. Sweeney (aka Knockout Sweeney) was the nom de guerre of a New York boxer who fought during the years 1911–1919. The name was coined by Sweeney's manager, Leo P. Flynn, who was known for assigning colorful nicknames to his fighters, including Tommy Bergin (the Lewiston Bear Cat), Andy Parker (Skull Cracker), Johnny Alberts (Jack the Jawbreaker) and Bert Stanley (the Oshkosh Assassin). Flynn's nickname for Sweeney was used over the years by several other American boxers.

== K.O. Sweeney of New York ==
Sweeney's career got underway in February 1911, when he fought Harry Edwards at New York's West Side Athletic Club. In May 1914, a newspaper reporter described K.O. Sweeney as the "fighting Irishman of the East Side...having never lost a decision from the time he started boxing three years ago...a New York product..." On May 18, 1914, the New Castle Herald reported that "Knockout Sweeney...one of the best lightweights ever turned out of New York..." would fight "Battling Terry" at the New Castle Opera House. To avoid confusion, the newspaper referred to the local boxer Dan Sweeney as "New Castle Knockout Sweeney."

In October 1915, The Brooklyn Daily Eagle reported that Sweeney "...at the present is cleaning up everything in front of him...Tommy Teague and many other good ones have their names on Sweeney's K.O. list."

By 1916, Sweeney was showing signs of wear. In June 1916, he fought Joe Chip for ten rounds in Rochester, during which "Sweeney didn't seem to have anything...but the ability to take a thrashing...the worst beating ever seen in Rochester." On July 10, 1916, Sweeney lost a ten-round bout with Paul Dixon, after which The Brooklyn Daily Eagle reported that, "K.O. Sweeney has decided that box fighting is no business and is going to give up the game." Nevertheless, Sweeney continued to fight, and in January 1917, lost a fifteen round fight with Hughey Ross at Bridgeport, Connecticut.

In July 1917, Sweeney enlisted in the army, one of many athletes who, according to The Pittsburgh Press "...responded in large and enthusiastic numbers to the call to colors without waiting for the draft." Among the boxers in the list the newspaper compiled was "K.O. Sweeney, New York, First Regiment, New York Engineers." By January 1918, Sweeney was serving with the 314th Infantry, stationed at Camp Meade, Maryland, where he fought and won an exhibition match with Mike Coughlin. During World War I, Sweeney served in France with the 39th Motor Transportation Corps, and was able to box at least once, in a bout with Sgt. Jimmy Fryer in front of 3,000 soldiers on April 2, 1919 at Arbanats, France, a fight that ended in a draw.

== Other boxers who adopted the nickname ==
=== K.O. Sweeney of Scranton, Pennsylvania ===
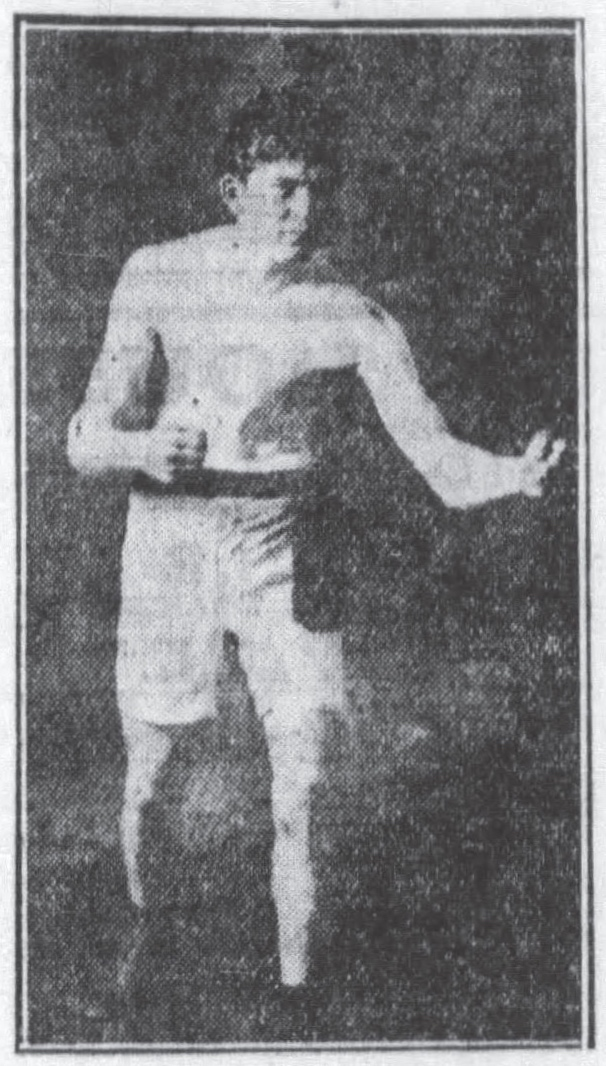
Johnny Sweeney of South Scranton pictured in 1913

John Sweeney of South Scranton, active during the years 1912–1915, was known variously as "K.O. Sweeney of Scranton," "Knockout Sweeney of Scranton," "Young Sweeney of South Scranton" and "Johnny Sweeney of Scranton."

In July 1912, Sweeney fought Joe Stead at Scranton's Town Hall. In December 1913, Sweeney fought Billie Bevan at Wilkes-Barre's Coliseum Athletic Club. According to The Wilkes-Barre Record, Sweeney was, at the time, the "recognized bantamweight champion of Lackawanna County."

Sweeney spent part of 1914 fighting in Syracuse, New York, but returned to Scranton at the end of that year.

=== K.O. Sweeney of New Castle, Pennsylvania ===
Daniel W. Sweeney (known in boxing circles as "Dan K.O. Sweeney" and "New Castle Knockout Sweeney") was a blacksmith from New Castle, Pennsylvania. His main claim to fame was to have fought and lost in six rounds to 52-year-old heavyweight Bob Fitzsimmons at the Athletic Club, Williamsport, Pennsylvania on January 29, 1914. Some believed the bout to be the first ever captured on film. However, boxing films had been made at least 17 years earlier (for example, Fitzsimmons' 1897 fight against Jim Corbett), proving the claim to be fallacious. Sweeney died at New Castle in February 1965.

=== K.O. Sweeney of Baltimore, Maryland ===
In November 1916, "Policeman K.O. Sweeney of the Baltimore police force, who was billed to meet Mike Uraine, a Washington copper, Wednesday, failed to put in an appearance, and as the result drew a year's suspension from the police board."

=== K.O. Sweeney of Plymouth, Pennsylvania ===
John A. Kraynak was born at Plymouth, Pennsylvania in 1894, the son of immigrants from Slovakia. He appears in the 1910 U.S. census, living at Plymouth, age 15, working as a slate picker in a coal mine. It was said he used the name "K.O. Sweeney" because it was an Irish-sounding name that would result in a bigger draw for his fights. According to his obituary, Kraynak was a veteran of World War 1, serving as a corporal in the 311th Machine Gun Battery, 79th Division, AEF, and saw considerable action in the Meuse-Argonne Forest, Monifausion, Grant Montague, and Troy Battle Areas.

Kraynak's boxing career, a local one, began in earnest in late 1919. In October that year, "Knockout Sweeney, of Plymouth" lost to Willie Stanton of Scranton. In January 1920, a newspaper reported: "The opening bout will be between Kid Carpenter of Edwardsville and 'K.O.' Sweeney of Plymouth in a six round fracas. Not much is known about these fighters, but according to rumors it is a feud battle..." In an April 1920 match at the Plymouth Armory, "K.O. Sweeney had Devil-Dog Jones seeing stars and baying at the moon in one-half minutes after the war started."

Kraynak died at Wilkes-Barre, Pennsylvania in 1961.

=== K.O. Sweeney of Coaldale, Pennsylvania ===
John Clement Sweeney, a lightweight boxer, was born at Lansford, Pennsylvania on March 28, 1899. Sweeney boxed from 1916 until 1924, when he broke his right hand. During his career, he won the Bantam Title of the Coal Fields of PA, as well as the Coal Region Lightweight Championship. In May 1917, "K.O. Sweeney of Coaldale forced Joe Rivers, of William Penn, to retire in the third round." In September 1921, Sweeney fought a preliminary bout at the American Athletic Club in Hazleton, Pennsylvania, with "Johnson of Hazleton." Sweeney died in February 1937 when he was accidentally hit by an automobile.

=== K.O. Sweeney of Plains, Pennsylvania ===
On April 5, 1923, "K.O. Jack Sweeney of Plains" fought "Kid Williams of Plymouth" at the Majestic Theater in Wilkes-Barre, Pennsylvania. In April 1925, "K.O. Sweeney of Plains" fought six rounds with Henri Ambler at the Gaiety Theater. In May 1925, a newspaper reporter described him as "...a likable Plains boy, a classy scrapper and quite a good hitter too." In August 1925, "K.O. Johnny Sweeney of Plains" signed with Scranton fight manager Hank Stezar.

=== K.O. Sweeney of Oshkosh, Wisconsin ===
In September 1960, Thomas F. Sweeney, age 68, of Racine, Wisconsin was arraigned for manslaughter after his wife died from a blow to the head. Sweeney told the court administrator that he "used to box under the name K.O. Sweeney. He said he had 105 or 108 fights, won 80 and had 23 or 24 knockouts. He said he himself had never been knocked out." In fact, Sweeney (whose real name was Frank Harnitz) fought between during the years 1915–1922 using the alias Frank Sanders. In October 1919, a newspaper reported that "Sanders has been a boxer and wrestler for four years and was in the service at Camp Grant where he instructed soldiers in boxing and wrestling. His former home was Hammond, Indiana. He is now employed as a game warden in this county." In November 1919, the newspapers reported that "Frank Sanders of Oshkosh...was no match for Sailor Bill Perknis of Rhinelander who showed the fans a good time." In April 1922, Jack Zwick of Kaukauna beat Sanders at Oshkosh by knocking him out in the second round.

In 1933, his boxing career behind him, Sweeney pleaded guilty to the second-degree murder of Felix Zelul, who died from a blow to the face and whose body police found lying on Highway 38.

Sweeney never stood trial for the murder of his wife. In October 1960, he was declared legally insane, the result of brain damage from boxing and chronic alcoholism, and confined to a mental hospital. Sweeney died at Oshkosh on February 4, 1983.
